= List of model railways =

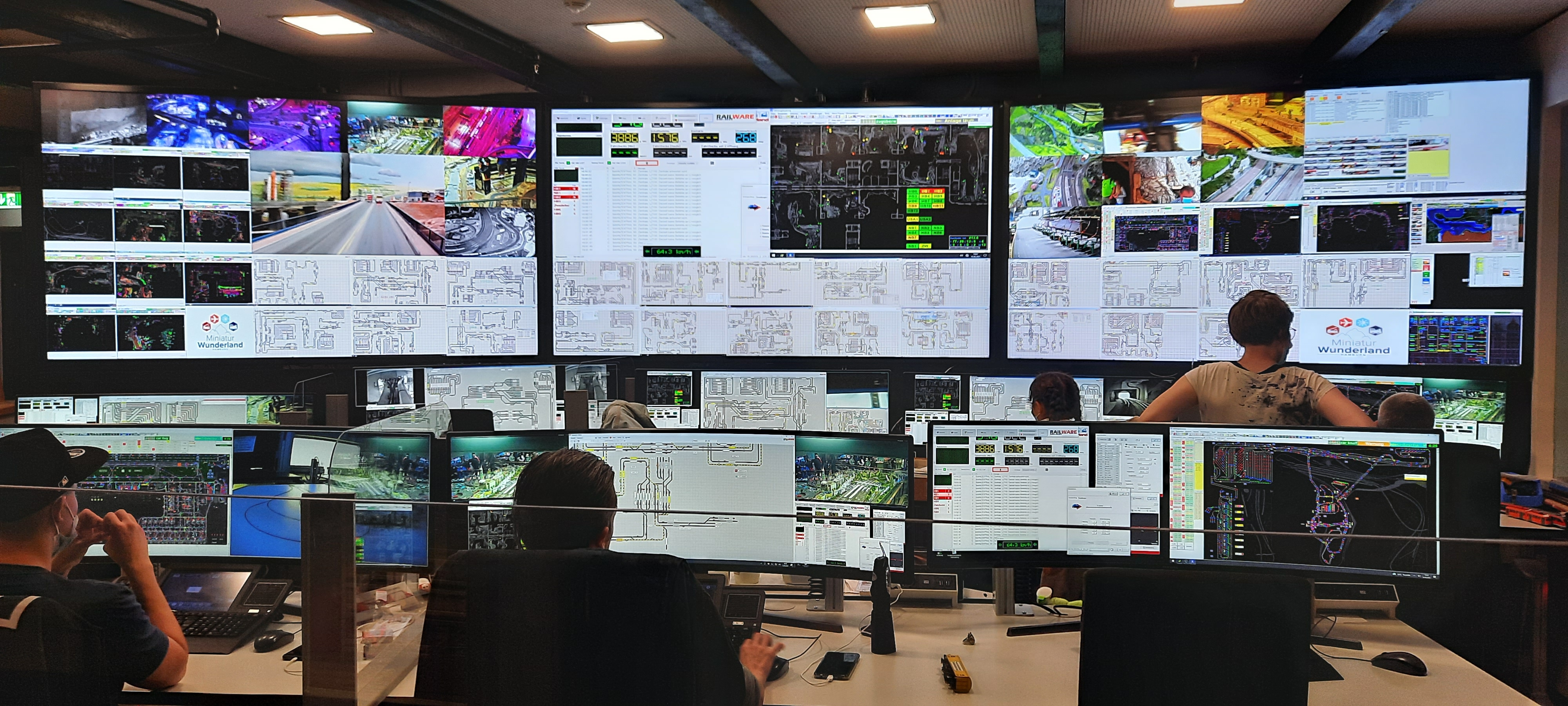
The control room at Miniatur Wunderland

This is a list of model railways.

The world's first model railway was made for the son of Emperor Napoleon III in 1859 at the Château de Saint-Cloud. However, "There is a strong possibility that Matthew Murray, who built the geared-for-safety rack engines for John Blenkinsop's coal mine near Leeds, England, was actually the first man ever to make a model locomotive."

== List ==
- Carolwood Pacific Railroad - USA
- Choo Choo Barn (O) - USA
- Colorado Model Railway Museum, Greeley, CO
- EnterTRAINment (1992-2000) (O) - USA
- Gorre & Daphetid (HO) - USA
- The Great Train Story (HO) - USA
- Miniatur Wunderland — the world's largest model railway and airport (HO) - Hamburg, Germany
- Miniature Railroad & Village - USA
- Modelbane Europa (HO) - Hadsten, Denmark
- Nassau Lionel Operating Engineers (O) - USA
- National Railway Museum - a railway museum including a model railway (O) - York, United Kingdom.
- New Jersey Hi Railers (O) - USA
- Northlandz (HO) - USA
- Pendon Museum (EM '4mm') - Long Wittenham near Oxford, United Kingdom
- Roadside America (O) - USA
- Toy Train Museum (O) - USA
- Train Masters Of Babylon (O) - USA
- Sonoma TrainTown Railroad 1:4 scale - USA
- Virginian and Ohio
- Grand Maket Rossiya (HO) - St. Petersburg, Russia
- MinNature (HO) - Subang Jaya, Malaysia
- EnterTRAINment Junction (G) - USA
- Swiss Museum of Transport (HO) – Replica of the Gotthard railway line.
- Sydney Live Steam Locomotive Society West Ryde, NSW
- The Model Railroad Club of Toronto Toronto, ON
- Arizona Model Railroading Society, Phoenix, AZ
- Golden State Model Railroad Museum, Point Richmond, Richmond, California
- Highland Park Society of Model Railroad Engineers, also known as the Highland Pacific Club of San Gabriel, CA
- San Diego Model Railroad Museum, San Diego, CA
- Tech Model Railroad Club, HO scale, student organization at Massachusetts Institute of Technology (MIT)
- Cherry Valley 2-rail O scale, Merchantville NJ.
- New York Society of Model Engineers, Carlstadt NJ. Incorporated 1926.
- Klub železničných modelárov Prešov, Slovakia. Founded in 2013

== UK and Ireland ==
Name	Creator	Scale	Date	Description
Bekonscot	Bassett-Lowke	Gauge 1	1930s–	A two acre outdoor model village with an extensive railway. The sheer size of this was remarkable. The railway continues in operation to this day.
Madder Valley	John H. Ahern (1903–1961)	00	1939	Considered to be the first 'scenic model railway', Madder Valley and John Ahern's series of books was a major influence on railway modelling through the 1950s. As well as its scenic aspects, this also represented an influential shift from compressed representations of main line stations to a smaller branch line, where the model could more closely represent the original. Ahern was also a naturally pragmatic 00 modeller, despite the compromises of its undersized gauge. He combined prototypes from smaller standard gauge locomotives with those of the 3 foot gauge Isle of Man Railway Beyer Peacocks. 'Most of my buildings are derived from something, but they are not exact copies.' The model survives today at the Pendon Museum.
Buckingham Branch	Rev. Peter Denny (1917–2009)	EM	1948–1970s	A fictional branch on the Great Central Railway. Buckingham went through a number of major rebuilds over the years and was regularly featured in the modelling press. As the first EM gauge layout to be exhibited, and for the extent and detail of its magazine coverage, it has been described as 'the single most important layout in the history of the hobby'. A feature of the later railway was 'The Automatic Crispin'. This was a very early example of model railway automation using a form of drum sequencer. It automatically generated signalbox bell codes, in much the way that Denny's son Crispin had previously done, when operating the railway. Denny died at the end of 2009 but portions of the layout are still exhibited. Its current owner, Tony Gee, continues to write about it for the model railway press.
Craig & Mertonford Railway	P.D. Hancock	00-9	1949	The model railway that established 00-9 standards, and popularised narrow gauge modelling in the UK.
Pendon Museum	Roye England / Guy Williams	EM	1954	Pendon began slowly in the 1930s and 1940s as a museum-grade attempt to record the changing scenery of rural Wiltshire by modelling. When the main effort of the railway mainline began in 1954, it adopted the early Finescale standard of EM gauge and the very highest standards in locomotive modelling, far beyond other work at this time. Pendon has become best known for its 50 GWR and other locomotives, modelled by Guy Williams. Pendon still attracts many visitors to this day.
	George Iliffe Stokes	4 mm scale, Gauge 1	1950s–	Previously a watercolour artist, Stokes' buildings were carefully recorded, drawn and modelled in cardboard. He was one of the first in the 1950s to emphasise the modelling of the buildings away from the railway itself, and to see the careful sketching of their details in the real world as essential for achieving convincing model. Some of his buildings can now be seen as part of Pendon. He also innovated the technique of modelling realistic trees, using trunks of twisted wire bundles that thinned progressively up the trunk, bound in gummed paper tape and plaster to smooth them. Trees now developed from 'bottle brushes' into recognisable models of particular species. In later years his own modelling moved outdoors, and to the larger scale of Gauge 1.
Minories	C. J. Freezer	00	1957	An influential design, more than as a single instance of a model; this is an attempt to model an interesting urban passenger terminus in the minimum space, allowing much opportunity for operating trains, more than scenic modelling. Freezer was the editor of Railway Modeller and Minories, and its developments, made regular appearances throughout the years.
Aire Valley Railway	Derek Naylor	00n3	1961	Another long-lived narrow gauge layout, the compact gauge and length of operation allowing the development of an extensive scenic context and backstory around the railway. The Aire Valley formed a series of articles in Railway Modeller through the early 1970s.
Adavoyle Junction	Tony Miles	P4 21 mm gauge Irish broad gauge and 12 mm OOn3 narrow gauge	1963	Adavoyle on the Great Northern Railway of Ireland in 1949, set at a fictional junction of the Dublin-Belfast main line. This was an important early example of P4 work, before the standards were fully established. The desire to model a local broad gauge prototype, without commercial model support, meant that scratchbuilding was necessary anyway and so the adoption of P4 was less of a change than was seen by British standard gauge modellers.
	Mike Sharman	4 mm / GWR broad gauge	1968	The first modelling of Brunel's broad gauge, a mixed-gauge layout of broad, Stephenson standard gauge and narrow gauge.
Heckmondwike	'North London Group' of the Scalefour Society; Bob Essery; Mike Peascod; Ray Hammond; Ken Morgan	P4	1973	Heckmondwike on the Midland Railway. One of the first really large group effort projects to use the P4 Finescale standard and consistently high modelling standards to provide a large museum-grade recreation of a distinct prototype.
Little Long Drag	David Jenkinson	EM	–1976	An ambitious project to model the 'Long Drag' of the Settle and Carlisle Line across the Pennines. The intention was to model a significant mainline route, at a size that would allow a reasonable representation of it and, like Pendon, an appropriate setting for large express locomotives. It incorporated Garsdale Road, one of Jenkinson's earlier models. The ambition was perhaps too much and the full layout was never fully completed, although its progress generated much coverage in the modelling press. In 1976 it was sold, and Jenkinson moved from 4 mm scale modelling to 7 mm scale, with his Kendal Branch model.
Under Milk Wood	Dave Rowe	00-9	1977	Modelled as a series of separate cabinets, which could be linked for exhibition. The main cabinet was a small Welsh fishing port, modelled on the Llareggub of Dylan Thomas' Under Milk Wood, complete with characters. A second cabinet contained a slate quarry, complete with rope-worked inclines and a third a farm scene with the minor inclusion of the railway passing by. A successor to his 1971 Milk Wood Railway. Now curated by the Welshpool and Llanfair Railway.
	Alan Downes	4 mm scale	c. 1977	A scenic modeller and constructor of buildings, more than a layout builder, Alan Downes and his "In Search of Realism" series in Railway Modeller raised the standards for representing masonry by moving away from factory-printed brick papers to relief modelling of authentic textures, using scribed plaster or applied computer chads to represent stonework.
Axford	Dave Rowe	00-9	1980-	An East Devon market town. Modelling of the street scene and its varied buildings takes clear precedence over railway operations. The main rail feature is a tram running the length of the main street, the small narrow gauge railway being almost an afterthought. Axford was noted for its innovative use of lighting, the display lights dimming automatically for a nighttime scene, lit from within the model.
Dorchester Junction	R.W.B.White / now Scalefour Society	4 mm / GWR broad gauge	1987	A mixed-gauge junction at the end of the broad gauge era, modelled to the finest standards of accuracy.
County Gate	John de Frayssinet	00-9	2008	A hypothetical extension of the narrow-gauge Lynton and Barnstaple Railway through the East Lyn Valley to Minehead. This was featured in a book written by the creator.
Casino Model Railway Museum	Cyril Fry	00	2000s-	44 square metres (470 sq ft) 00 layout opened in January 2020 with an additional overhead loop. The display in Malahide, Ireland replaced the previous 2,500 square feet (230 m^{2}) layout and collection of the Irish scene created by Cyril Fry and previously displayed in Malahide Castle from 1988 to 2010. The new museum also displays the Fry Model Collection.
Glenauchter	Gauge O Trust	O		Small layout housed in wooden railway carriages at Bo'ness railway station (heritage site) adjacent to the Scottish Railway Museum; its design is based on Gleneagles railway station.
The Biggest Little Railway in the World	Dick Strawbridge et al.	16mm Narrow Gauge	2017 (no longer in existence)	A temporary railway running 71 miles (114 km) from Fort William to Inverness Castle, now removed, although the construction was televised.

== Germany ==
Name	Creator	Scale	Date	Description
Miniatur Wunderland	Frederik and Gerrit Braun	H0	2001-	Model railway in Hamburg, Germany which as of March 2018 has a track length of 15,400 metres (50,500 ft) on a model space of 1,499 m^{2} (16,135 sq ft).
Historische Spielzeugeisenbahnen	Jens Vesper and family	HO		Small museum in Edertal, specializing in 1950s and 1960s model train shop window displays and memorabilia.
EFA Mobile Zeiten		ii		Oldtimer museum in Amerang, also containing a size ii model railway.

== India ==
Name	Creator	Scale	Date	Description
Joshi's Museum of Miniature Railway	Bhausaheb Joshi	H0	1998-	Model railway in Pune, India which also promotes the building of model trains and layouts.

== Switzerland ==
Name	Creator	Scale	Date	Description
Alpenbahnparadies	Willy Abbühl / McGill	0	1955-1990 / 2012-	Model railway in Kandersteg and around Eiger, Switzerland.
Foundation Railway Collection Uster		0, I		
Swiss Miniatur		I	1959-	Switzerland, 3560 m railway lines with 18 trains.
Swiss Transport Museum, Lucerne	EMBL	HO	1957/59-	North bound of the Gotthard Pass Line, Switzerland.
Fondation des Chemins de fer du Kaeserberg	Marc Antiglio	HO	1992/2009-	Switzerland in the 1990s with Swiss Federal Railways and Rhaetian Railway.
Stockerenbahn Bolligen Bern	Urs und Jürg Aeschlimann	Spur G	1979/2020-	Track of RhB Railway, Switzerland, Canton Graubünden, Rhetian Railways. Filisur, Chur, Surava, Bergün, Stugl, https://stockerenbahn.jimdofree.com/ near Berne in Bolligen in a garden, 3 times open per Year
Albula Railway	Albula-Bahn-Club Bergün (H0) / Bernhard Tarnutzer (0)	HO/0	1986- (H0) / 2012- (0)	Albula Railway in H0 and Albula Railway in 0 scale around 1960/70.

== United States ==
Name	Creator	Scale	Date	Description
Timesaver	John Allen (1913–1973)	H0	1972	"One of the plainest, even ugliest, little railroads ever built.", Timesaver was built as a diversion by modeller John Allen, well known for his 'Gorre & Daphetid Railroad'. It was a simple switching layout, of compact size and without requiring scenery. Its purpose was to be as an exercise in switching. A number of short stub sidings were provided around a short loop and five switches. Each stub was of limited capacity. The game of Timesaver was to place some cars randomly, or to a pre-chosen puzzle, and then require them to be switched into a selected order in the longer outbound siding. The operator achieving this either most quickly or, more rarely, with the fewest movements was considered the winner. A major part of this operation involved coupling and uncoupling. This relied on a reliable coupling that could be disengaged easily, either by hand or with ten remote uncouplers placed at defined locations on the layout. Allen's own choice was his 'Baker' coupler, uncoupled manually with a 'spoon' tool. Timesaver was described in Model Railroader in Allen's last article for them, shortly before his death. It was described more fully some years later. The baseboard of the original H0 Timesaver was 68 inches (1,700 mm) by 9.25 inches (235 mm). It was also arranged to fold inwards for storage. Two Timesavers could be coupled back-to-back to pass trains between them for a team competition. Non-identical derivatives of the original Timesaver have been described as 'Tymesavers' and catalogued by layout galleries such as Carl Arendt's. The original layout is still preserved at the NMRA museum in Chattanooga.

== Canada ==
Name	Creator	Scale	Date	Description
St. Jacob's & Aberfoyle	Frank and Gay Dubery	O scale	1972–	This layout is one of the finest O scale layouts in North America, modelling Southern Ontario in the 1950s. People can enjoy seeing a model of the Southern Ontario countryside, as well as late steam locomotives and first-generation diesel locomotives pulling trains down the line. It is currently owned by Waterloo County Heritage Preservation Inc.
Osoyoos Desert Model Railway	Poul and Ulla Penderson	OO gauge	2003-	With over two kilometers of track and 45 trains there is much to check out. It is known for its mini scenes alongside the track, as well as interactive displays. (for example, a button that causes a group of hens to peck at the ground.)

== See also ==
- List of rail transport modellers
