= Railway block code =

British railway signalling system

The railway block signalling bell code is a system of bell sounds used in Great Britain to communicate between manually operated Signal Boxes in implementing the railway block system. (The bell system is not used in modern power signal boxes, other than to any older adjacent signalboxes.) Each such signal box has a bell circuit to the boxes on either side of it along the line. The equipment consists of a plunger or tapper (rather like a Morse key) which when pressed, rings a single-stroke bell in a neighbouring box. That box similarly has a tapper for communicating back, so boxes have keys each of which rings the bell in a neighbouring box. The bells sound different tones, so that the signalman can tell them apart by ear.

== Examples ==
Although codes varied from region to region, the following shows a few selected standard UK bell codes:

Code	Meaning
1 bell	Call attention
2 bells	Train entering section
2 - 3 bells (2 bells, pause, 3 bells)	Is line clear for light engine?
2 - 2 - 1	Is line clear for empty coaching stock train?
3	Is line clear for stopping freight train?
3 - 1	Is line clear for stopping passenger train?
3 - 1 - 1	Is line clear for express freight train?
4	Is line clear for express passenger train?
4 - 1	Is line clear for mineral or empty wagon train?
2 - 1	Train arrived
3 - 3	Blocking back outside home signal
5 - 2	Release token [for single line sections only]
2 - 5	Token replaced
5 - 5 - 5	Opening signal box
7 - 5 - 5	Closing signal box
6	Obstruction danger
4 - 5 - 5	Train running away on Right Line
2 - 5 - 5	Train running away on Wrong Line
16	Testing bells and instruments

== Typical use ==
These would be used as follows (assuming a simple exchange between two signal boxes on a plain section of line) between two signal boxes A and B. Assume a train is to pass from the block controlled by A to the block controlled by B. This must be agreed and permitted by the signalman in box B. Here is the sequence of bell codes and associated actions:

1. Box A sends 1 bell to box B. (Call attention.)
2. Box B replies with 1 bell to box A. (Acknowledgement, indicating readiness.)
3. Box A sends 4 bells to box B. (Is line clear for express passenger train?)
4. Box B sends 4 bells to box A. (Acknowledgement, if in the position to accept the train giving permission for box A to signal the train into the block controlled by B.)
5. (when the signalled train enters the portion of line between A and B.) Box A sends 2 bells to box B (Train entering section) as the train passes box A and enters the block controlled by B. This is acknowledged by box B.
6. Box B sends 2 - 1 bells to box A (Train out of section) after confirming that the train has arrived complete and no portion of it remains within the block section between A and B or the clearing point for that section. This could be done by the guard of the train notifying the signalman or by the signalman observing the tail-lamp. This is acknowledged by box A.

== See also ==
- Bell codes are used on multiple unit trains for communication between drivers and guards, but are not the codes listed above.
- Whistle codes are used by railway engines to communicate with signal boxes and other staff.
