= The Knickerbocker Hotel =

Hotel in Manhattan, New York

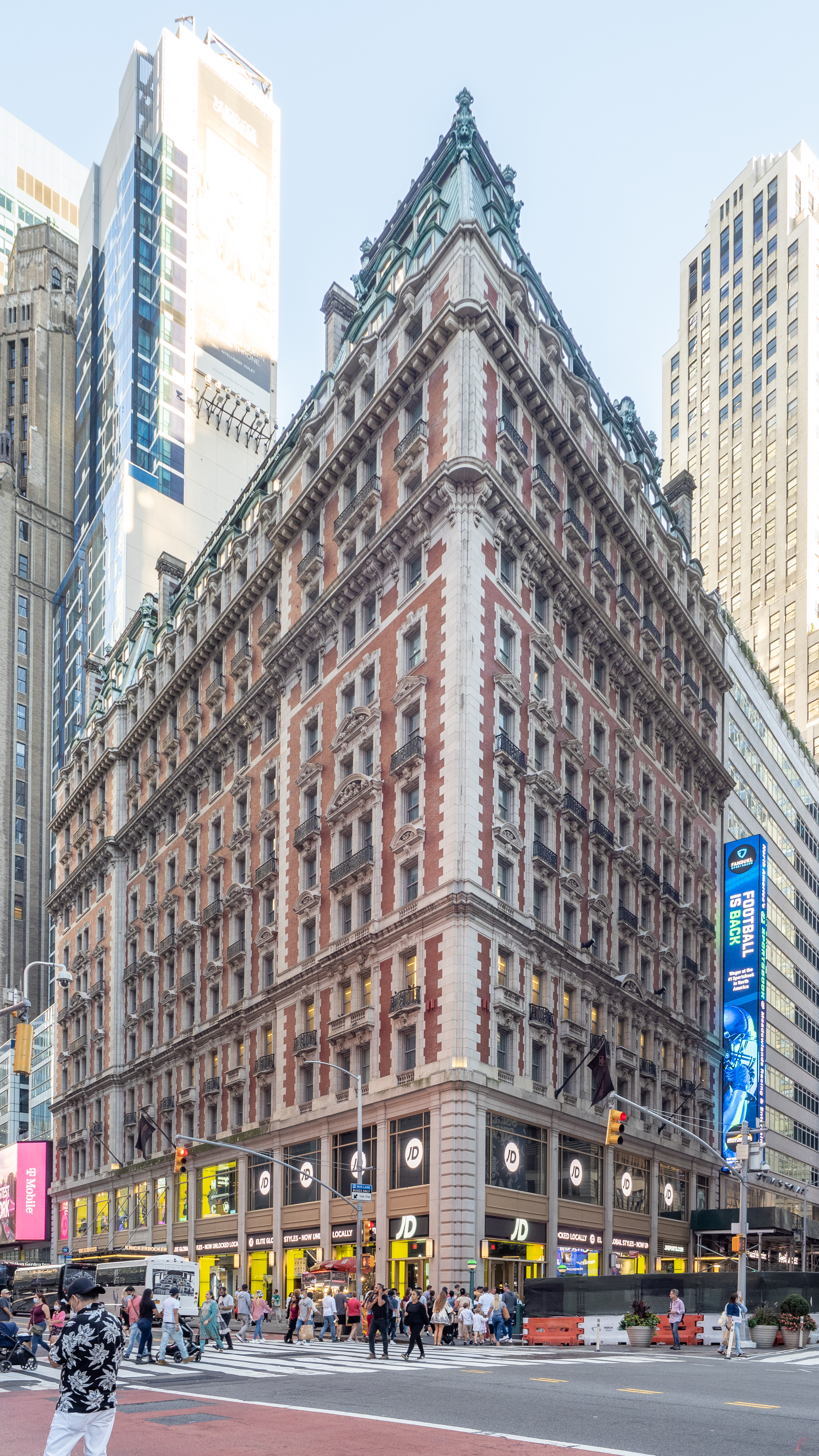
- Seen from across Broadway and 42nd Street, 2021
- Former names: Knickerbocker Building, Newsweek Building, 6 Times Square

General information
- Type: Hotel
- Architectural style: Beaux Arts
- Location: 142 West 42nd Street; Manhattan, New York 10036
- Coordinates: 40°45′19″N 73°59′12″W
- Construction started: 1901
- Topped-out: February 1904
- Opened: October 23, 1906
- Renovated: 1920, 1980, 1999–2003, 2013–2015
- Owner: FelCor Lodging Trust

Height
- Height: 195 feet (59 m)

Technical details
- Material: Brick, limestone, terracotta
- Floor count: 15
- Floor area: approximately 300,000 square feet (28,000 m^{2})
- Grounds: 19,800 square feet (1,840 m^{2})

Design and construction
- Architects: Marvin & Davis (exterior); Bruce Price (consultant)
- Architecture firm: Trowbridge & Livingston (original interior)
- Developer: International Realty and Construction Company; John Jacob Astor IV
- Main contractor: International Realty and Construction Company

Renovating team
- Architects: Gabellini Sheppard Associates; Peter Poon Architects

Other information
- Number of rooms: 330
- Number of restaurants: 3
- Number of bars: 2

Website
- theknickerbocker.com
- Knickerbocker Hotel
- U.S. National Register of Historic Places
- New York State Register of Historic Places
- New York City Landmark
- Coordinates: 40°45′19″N 73°59′12″W
- Built: 1901–1906
- Architects: Trowbridge & Livingston; Marvin & Davis; Bruce Price
- Architectural style: Beaux Arts
- NRHP reference No.: 80002697
- NYSRHP No.: 06101.000572
- NYCL No.: 1556

Significant dates
- Added to NRHP: April 11, 1980
- Designated NYSRHP: June 23, 1980
- Designated NYCL: October 18, 1988

The Knickerbocker Hotel is a hotel at Times Square, on the southeastern corner of Broadway and 42nd Street, in the Midtown Manhattan neighborhood of New York City, New York, U.S. Built by John Jacob Astor IV, the hostelry was designed in 1901 and opened in 1906. Its location near the Theater District around Times Square was intended to attract not only residential guests but also theater visitors.

The hotel is designed largely in the Beaux-Arts style by Marvin & Davis, with Bruce Price as consultant. Its primary frontages are on Broadway and 42nd Street. These facades are constructed of red brick with terracotta details and a prominent mansard roof. The Knickerbocker Hotel also incorporates an annex on 41st Street, built in 1894 as part of the St. Cloud Hotel, which formerly occupied the site. The 41st Street facade contains a Romanesque Revival designed by Philip C. Brown. The hotel contains 300 rooms, a restaurant, a coffee shop, and a roof bar. The original interior design was devised in 1905 by Trowbridge & Livingston, scattered remnants of which include an entrance that formerly led from the New York City Subway's Times Square station to the hotel's basement.

The original hotel housed Enrico Caruso and George M. Cohan until it was shuttered in 1920 due to a decrease in business. The building was then converted to offices, becoming the Knickerbocker Building; it was the home of Newsweek magazine from 1940 to 1959 during which it was called the Newsweek Building. After major renovations in 1980, it became known as 1466 Broadway and was used as garment showrooms and offices. Following another renovation in 2001, it was known as 6 Times Square. The Knickerbocker was added to the National Register of Historic Places in 1980 and was designated a New York City Landmark in 1988. It was converted back to a hotel from 2013 to 2015 under its original name.

== Site ==
The Knickerbocker Hotel is on the southeastern corner of Broadway and 42nd Street, at the south end of Times Square, in the Midtown Manhattan neighborhood of New York City, New York, U.S. It contains the alternate addresses 1462–1470 Broadway, 6 Times Square, and 142 West 42nd Street, with a small annex extending south to 143 West 41st Street. The building occupies a land lot covering 19,800 square feet (1,840 m^{2}), with frontages of about 135 feet (41 m) on Broadway to the west and about 185 feet (56 m) on 42nd Street to the north. The frontage on 41st Street is only 17 feet (5.2 m) wide.

The Knickerbocker Hotel wraps around 8 Times Square at the corner of Broadway and 41st Street. The site is adjacent to 5 Times Square and Times Square Tower to the west, One Times Square to the northwest, 4 Times Square to the north, the Bank of America Tower and Stephen Sondheim Theatre to the northeast, and the Bush Tower to the east. An entrance to the New York City Subway's Times Square–42nd Street station, served by the 1, 2, 3, 7, <7>, N, Q, R, W, and S trains, is immediately outside the hotel; a direct entrance originally led from the basement (see The Knickerbocker Hotel § Basements).

=== Previous use ===
John Jacob Astor and William Cutting bought a large tract of land in modern-day Times Square from Metcef Eden in 1803. The land comprised much of the modern-day West Side of Manhattan between 41st and 48th streets; Astor obtained the eastern half of that land, which included Broadway. By the late 19th century, the Knickerbocker's site was occupied by the Hotel St. Cloud, which opened in 1868 at Broadway and 42nd Street. At the time, it was relatively far from the developed portions of Manhattan. Grand Central Depot, predecessor of Grand Central Terminal, was developed nearby in 1871, resulting in the growth of the surrounding neighborhood.

Members of the Astor family decided to divide the Astor land within Times Square in 1890, at which point the area contained many small buildings, which sat on land leased from the Astors. In 1892, John Jacob Astor IV acquired the lease of the Hotel St. Cloud for $850,000. (Note: Equivalent to $27 million in 2025 (Note: Johnston, Louis; Williamson, Samuel H. (2023). "What Was the U.S. GDP Then?". MeasuringWorth. United States Gross Domestic Product deflator figures follow the MeasuringWorth series.)) With transit improvements in the late 19th and early 20th centuries, New York City's theater district relocated from further south in Manhattan to modern-day Times Square. The construction of theaters led to the development of other entertainment facilities such as hotels, dance halls, and restaurants. Furthermore, the Knickerbocker site was adjacent to the city's first subway line, providing access from the rest of the city.

== Architecture ==
The Knickerbocker Hotel, completed in 1906, was designed by Marvin & Davis with consulting architect Bruce Price. The structure was largely designed in the Beaux-Arts style. The annex on 143 West 41st Street, which was built in 1894 as an addition to the Hotel St. Cloud, contains a Romanesque Revival facade designed by Philip C. Brown. The 41st Street annex was intentionally incorporated into the current hotel building. The interiors were designed by Trowbridge & Livingston. The hotel measures 195 feet (59 m) tall.

=== Facade ===
==== Broadway and 42nd Street ====
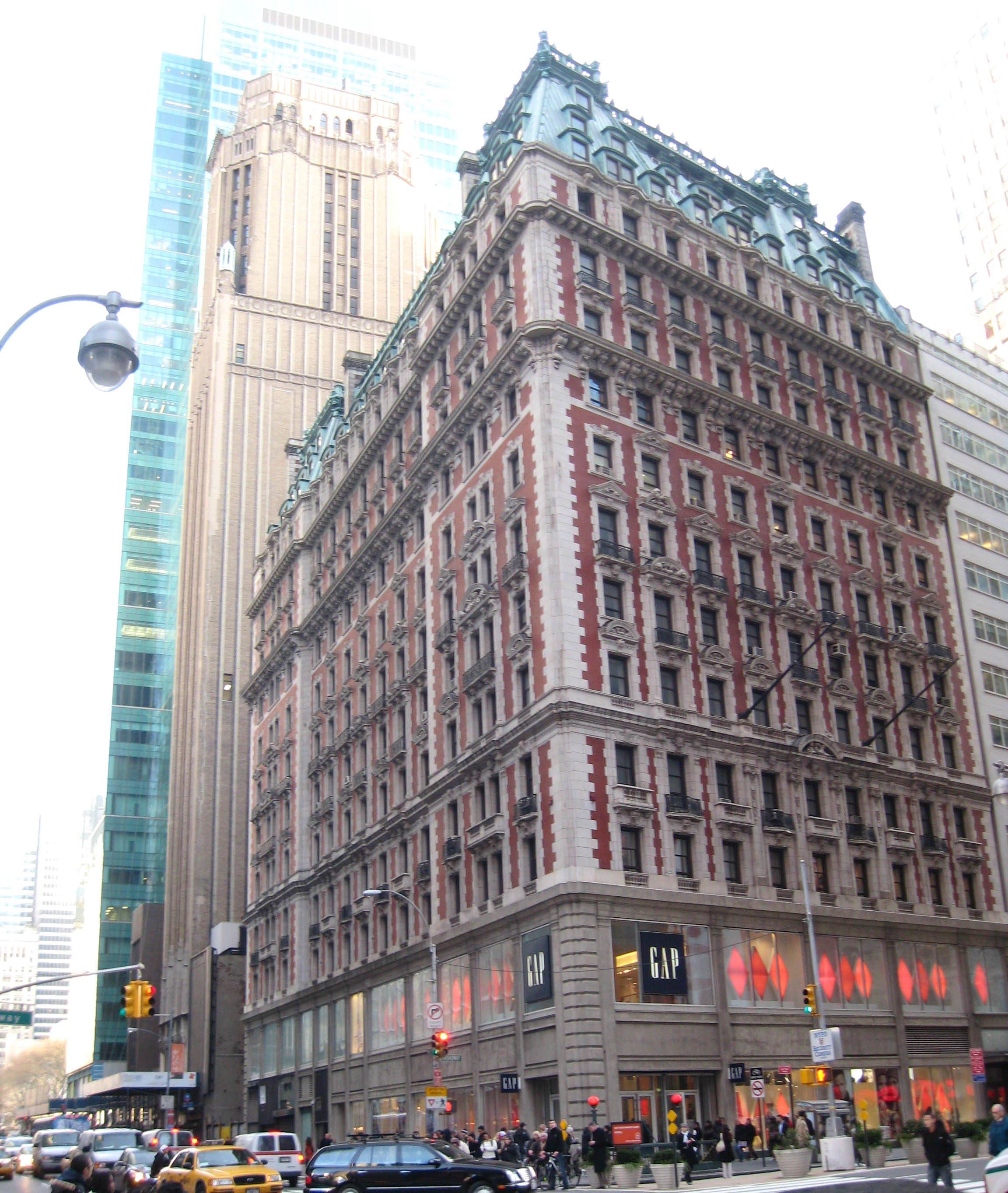
The 42nd Street (left) and Broadway (right) facades of the Knickerbocker Hotel, seen in 2008. In the background can be seen 1095 Avenue of the Americas and the Bush Tower.

The Knickerbocker Hotel's Broadway and 42nd Street facades are articulated into three horizontal sections: a two-story base, a ten-story shaft, and a three-story mansard roof. The ground and second stories serve as a commercial base and have seen numerous design changes since 1920. The vertical limestone piers are the only portions of the original design that remain at the base. Originally, a ground-level portico projected from the center seven bays of the 42nd Street facade, with seven round arches topped by a balustrade. This portico was removed by 1911. There was a similar portico at the center five bays on Broadway, which was flush with the rest of the facade. The second floor contained round-arched windows. The Broadway facade originally contained a secondary entrance to the cafe.

On the third through twelfth floors, the building is clad in red brick with decorative elements made of Indiana Limestone and terracotta. Some of the limestone and terracotta ornamentation has been replaced with similar-looking concrete. Along 42nd Street, the outermost four bays are grouped into slightly projecting "corner pavilions", flanking the center seven bays. The two center bays on each corner pavilion are paired. The Broadway facade is nine bays wide and lacks projecting corner pavilions. Each window is flanked by stone quoins. The fourth, sixth, seventh, and eleventh-story windows contain either decorative iron balcony rails or stone balustrades. The pediments atop windows on each story are variously made of segmental arches, sculptured decorations, or swans' necks.

A small cornice runs above the fourth story, while more substantial cornices run above the ninth and eleventh stories. At Broadway, the center bay contains an arched pediment above the fourth-story window that interrupts the cornice above it. The ninth story cornice is supported by decorative brackets while the eleventh story cornice is supported by modillions. All three cornices have lost some of their original decorative elements.

The thirteenth through fifteenth stories are part of the mansard roof, which is clad in green copper and is steeply sloped. There are also urns at the corners of the roof. Originally, the dormer windows from the mansard roof contained elaborate pediments, although these were likely removed by 1920. The thirteenth floor windows' pediments were either triangular or segmentally arched. The fourteenth floor windows' pediments were round-arched. A penthouse on the fifteenth floor was added between 1908 and 1910 to designs by C. H. Cullen.

==== 41st Street ====
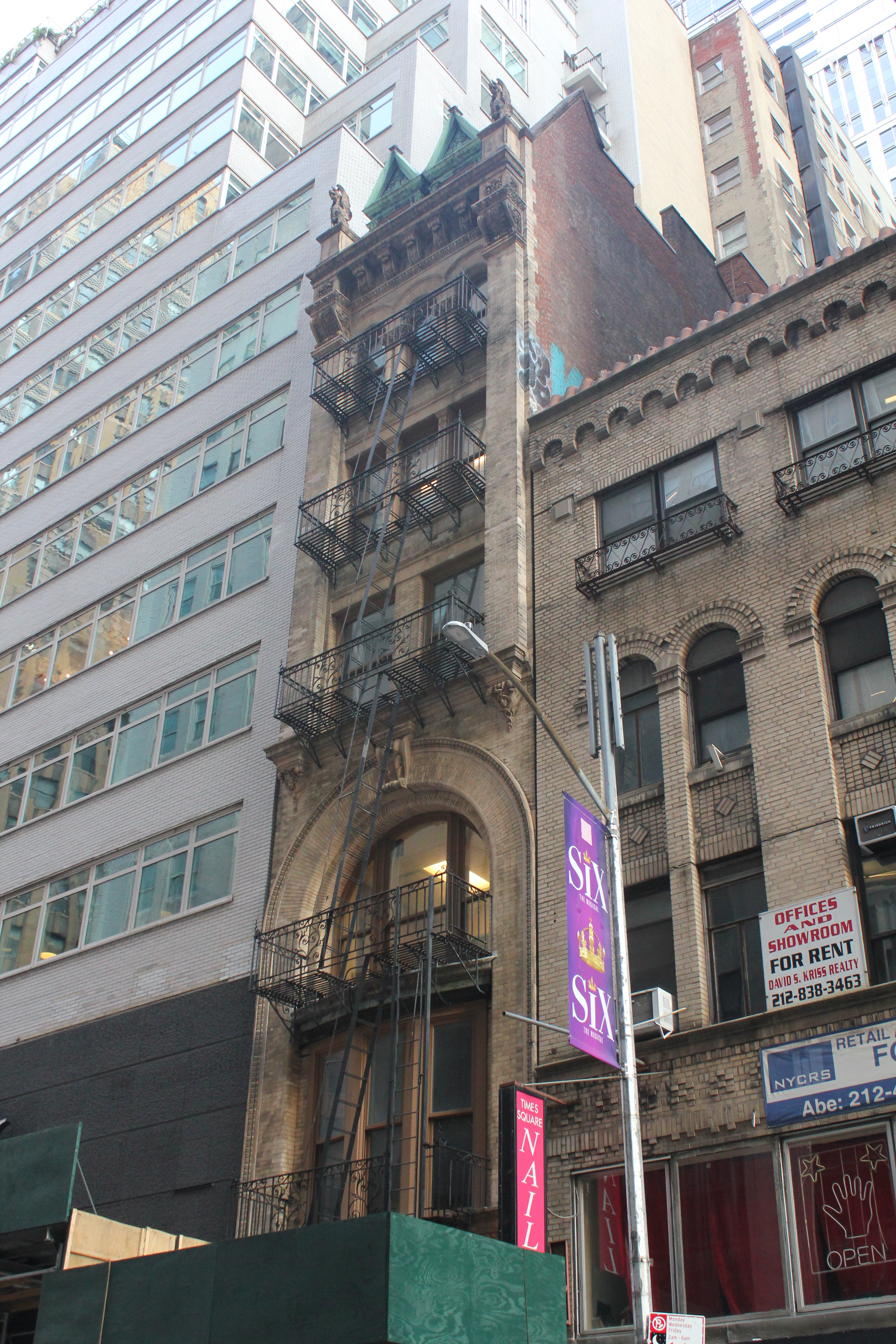
41st Street facade

The 41st Street facade of the Knickerbocker Hotel is eight stories tall and is designed in the Romanesque Revival style, with some ornament in the Beaux-Arts style. The facade is made of buff brick and terracotta. It was intended as a service entrance to the main Knickerbocker Hotel.

The annex previously contained a second story with three bays of windows, above which runs a classical-style cornice. When the Knickerbocker was re-converted back into a hotel in the 2010s, the double-height first story was altered for a service entrance that takes up the entire width of the 41st Street facade. The third floor was skipped. The fourth and fifth stories are topped by an arch that spans the entire width of the annex. The sixth through eighth stories are flanked by pilasters, with two bays each on the sixth and seventh stories and three bays on the eighth stories. The attic, on the ninth story, was constructed in 1906 and contains two dormer windows with triangular copper pediments.

=== Features ===
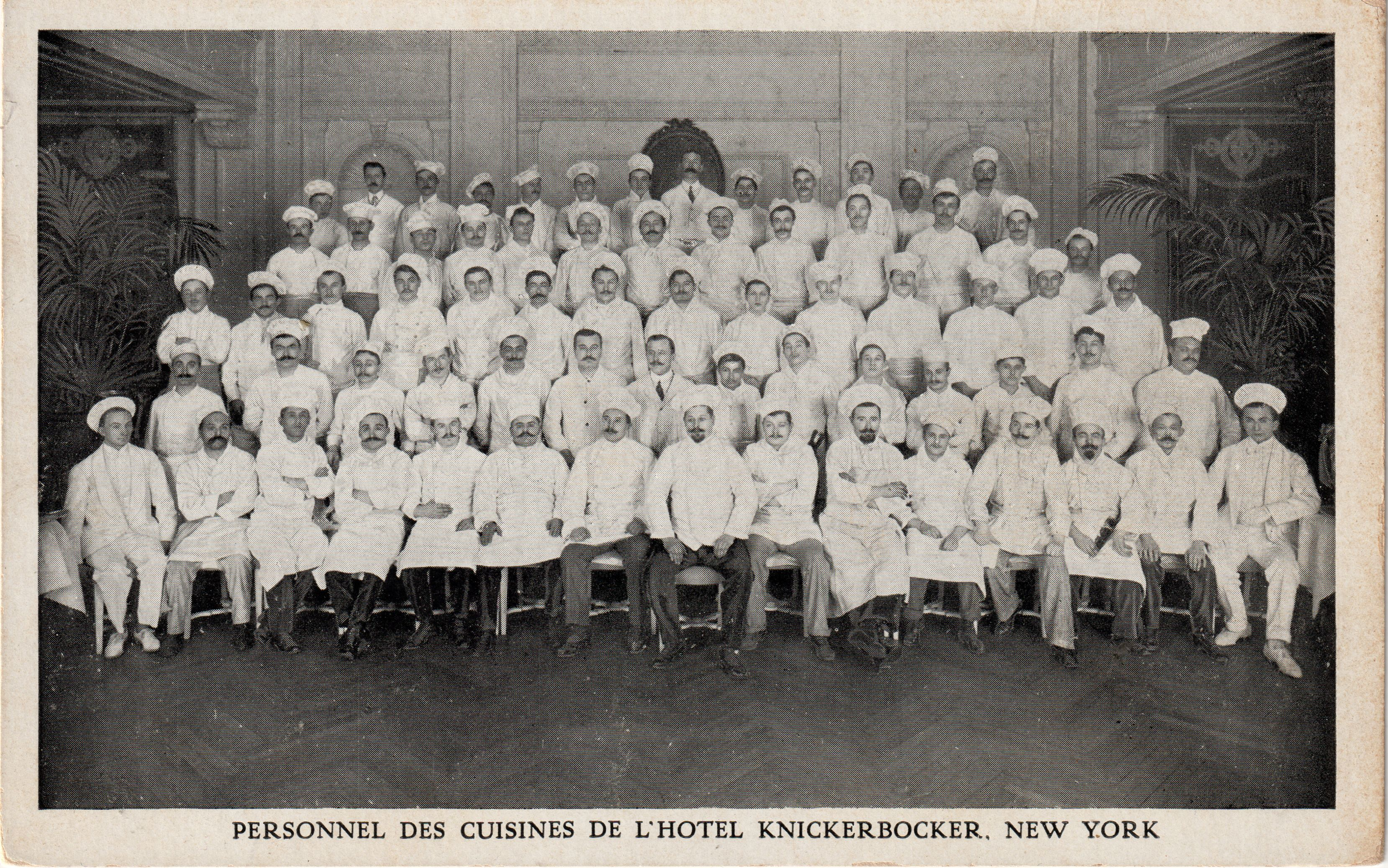
Kitchen staff of the Hotel Knickerbocker, New York - circa 1930s

The modern Knickerbocker Hotel contains 330 guestrooms. 27 of the rooms are advertised as junior suites, while four are labeled as signature suites. Hotel dining includes the Charlie Palmer Steak IV restaurant; Jake's coffee shop; The Martini Lounge; and a sushi bar, Akoya, inside its St. Cloud rooftop bar overlooking Times Square. The hotel's total interior space is about 300,000 square feet (28,000 m^{2}).

The first Hotel Knickerbocker originally had 556 guestrooms, 400 of which contained baths. The Knickerbocker was described in Architects and Builders Magazine as having "magnificent equipment and excellent service". The Knickerbocker's various artworks were a prominent part of the original interior design, having been installed as a way to enhance the interior character at a relatively low cost. A critic for the Architectural Record praised the interior design, saying: "There are few hotels in the country in the appearance of which such uniform good taste has been displayed", although the same critic took issue with the interior layout. Connecting the various floors were four passenger elevators and four freight and service elevators. The original hotel had five hundred clocks, which were made in Paris and maintained by an employee who was specifically tasked with winding them each day. The modern hotel has only 330 rooms.

During much of the 20th century, the hotel interiors were used as office space, but by 2015 these stories had been converted back to hotel suites. Little evidence remains of the original design. On the upper stories, the only remnants of the original design were radiators and terrazzo floors. The 2015 hotel renovation redesigned the interiors in a modernist style.

==== Basements ====
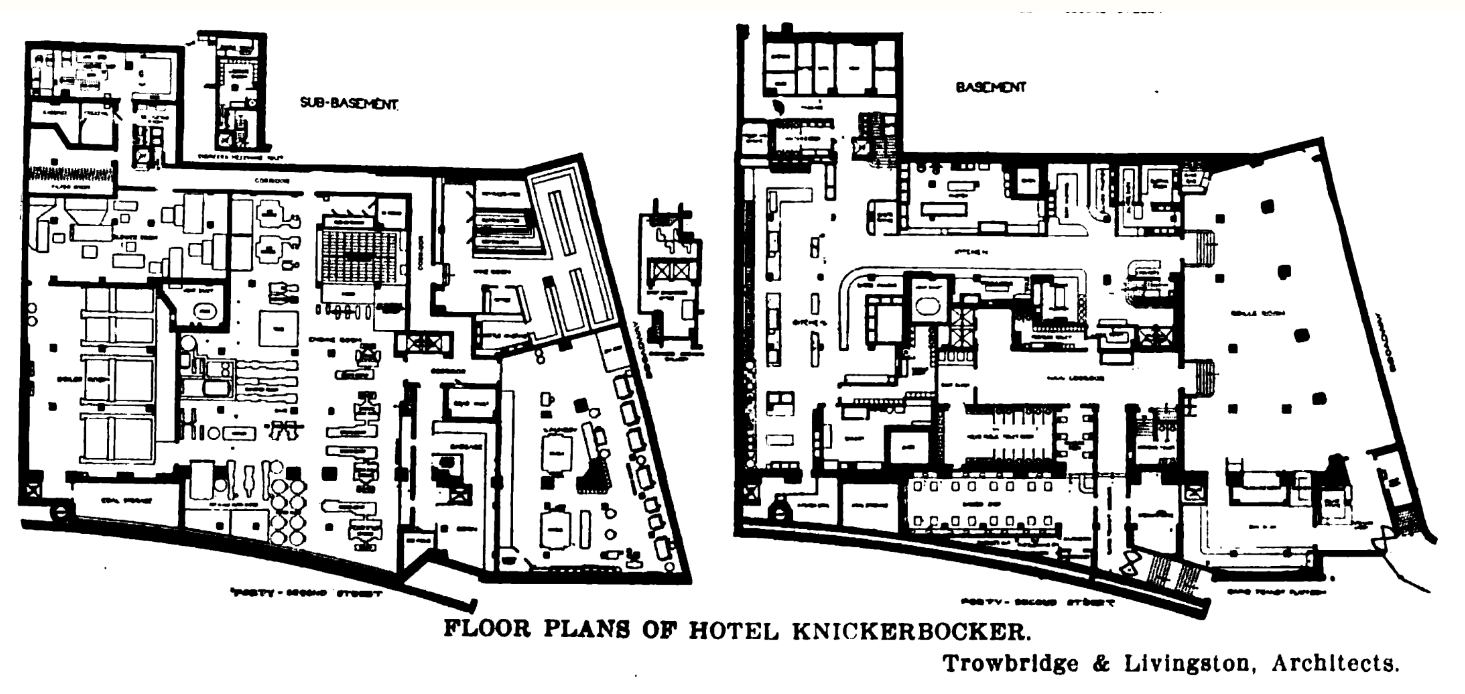
Original floor plans for the basement and subbasement

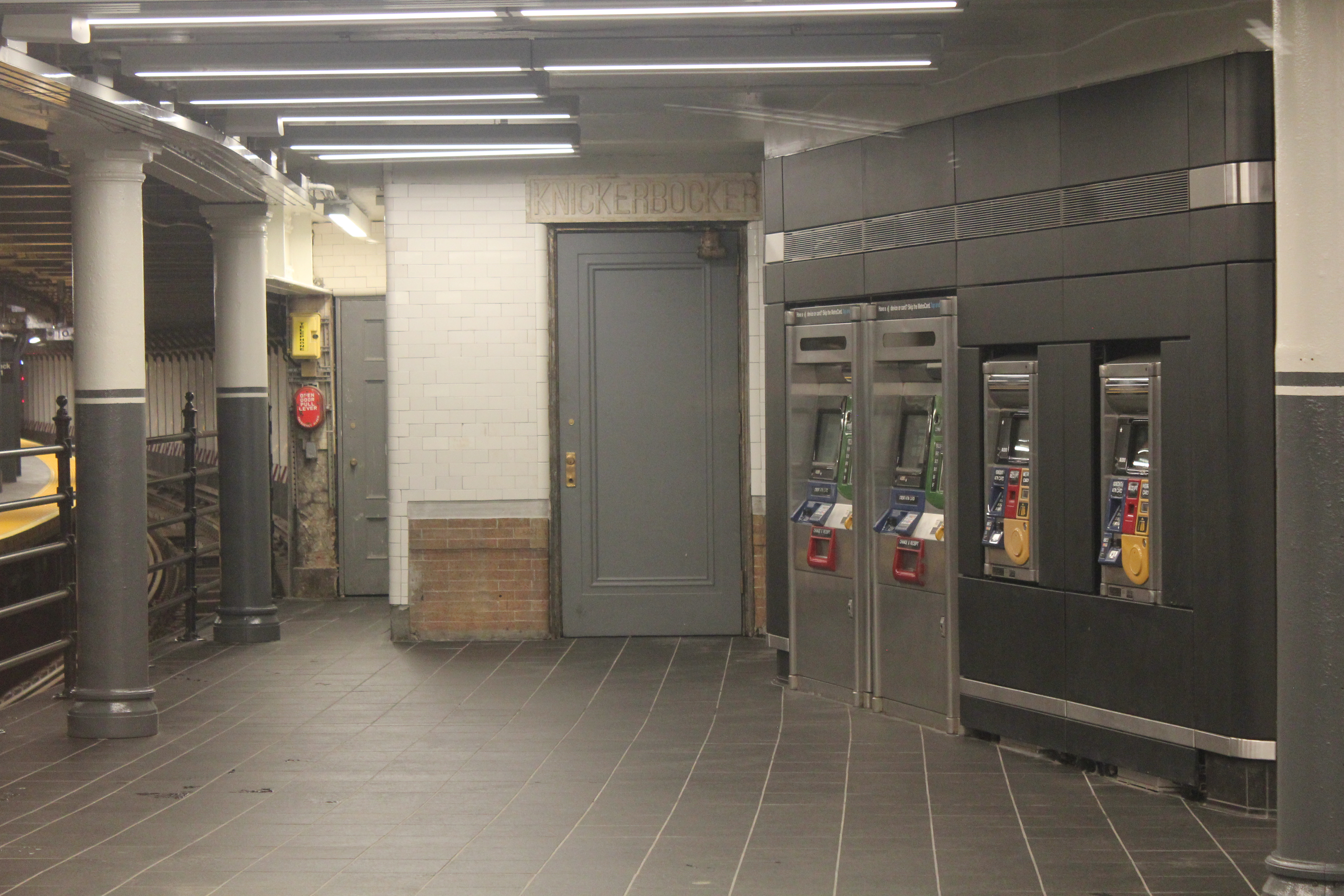
The closed doorway to the original hotel, part of the subway station's fare-control area

Below the lobby is a basement and subbasement, which retain their wall paneling, herringbone-patterned floors, and hexagonal white tile decorations. The basement had a grillroom, bar, broker's office, barber and manicure parlors, and the kitchen. The grillroom contained an English design with plain oak walls and a Gothic oak ceiling. Displayed in the basement bar was a Frederic Remington painting entitled "The United States Cavalry Charge", interspersed with mirrored wall panels and gold-colored hangings. The kitchen had refrigerating plants, heating plants, and glass and silver chests, accessed by four dumbwaiters from the kitchen. The ice machines could make up to 8 short tons (7.1 long tons; 7.3 t) of ice daily, and a pneumatic cleaning system served the whole hotel.

The subbasement contained the mechanical plant with boilers, coal storage bins, electrical generators, water filters, an ice-making plant, and an engine room. The wine vault, cigar vault, baggage room, and laundry facility were also in the subbasement.

At the time of the hotel's opening in 1906, the hotel's management advertised two direct subway entrances from the Times Square station, with one entrance intended for ladies. One doorway still exists on the platform adjacent to the 42nd Street Shuttle's track 1, topped by a lintel containing the carved word "Knickerbocker". Before the station opened as part of the city's first subway line in 1904, John Jacob Astor IV had given permission for the subway to be constructed through part of his property only if the station included a hotel entrance. Banners were originally displayed in the corridor leading to the subway. The hotel entrance was rearranged when the platform was lengthened in 1909. While the entrance was closed after the original iteration of the hotel was shuttered, the passageway to the entrance has retained much of its ornamentation, such as painted roundels. In 2019, as part of the remodeling of the modern shuttle station, the damaged Knickerbocker marble lintel was to be replaced with a replica. The modern doorway leads to a subway manhole with mechanical equipment rather than to the Knickerbocker's basement.

==== Ground and second stories ====
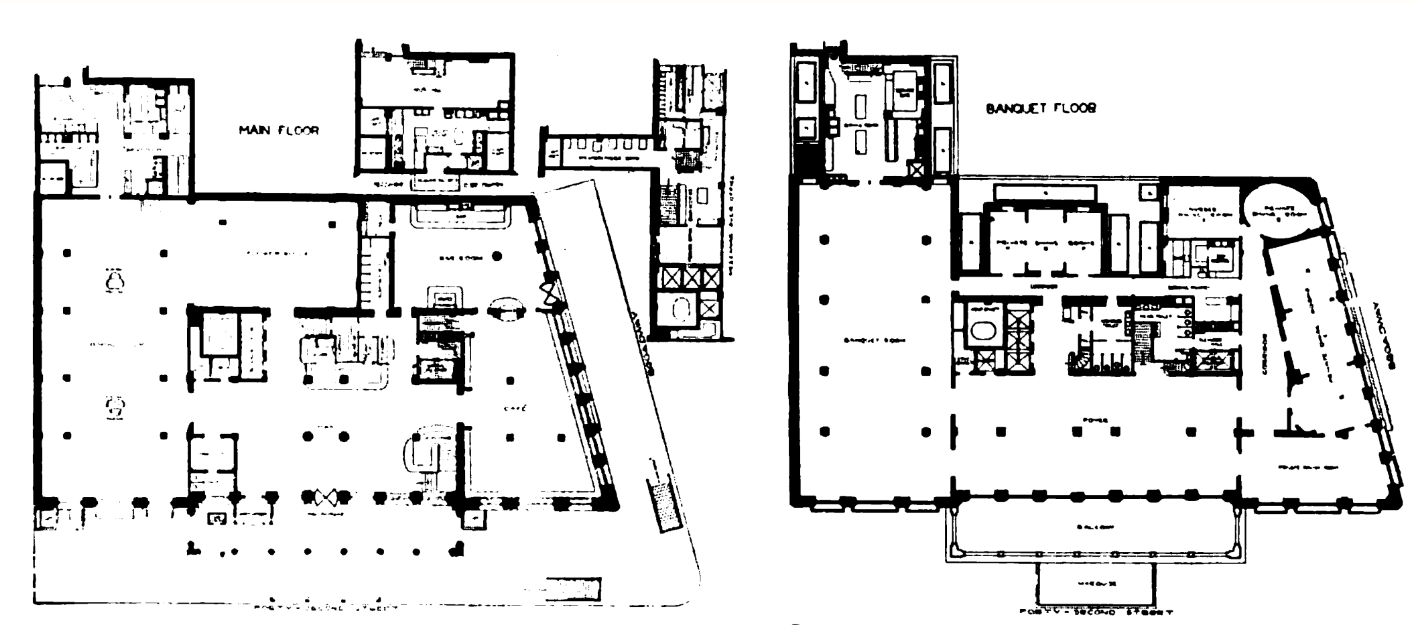
Original floor plan for the main and banquet floors (the present first and second floors)

The original design had a lobby facing 42nd Street, with marble columns, bronze pendant lanterns, and red-and-gold foyer decorations. The lobby had a statue of Father Knickerbocker, a political-cartoon personification of New York City. Leading off the lobby were safe deposit boxes, and a bookstand and ticket office. The cafe west of the lobby had white and gold decorations. For the attached bar southwest of the lobby, artist Maxfield Parrish was commissioned to paint "Old King Cole and His Fiddlers Three", a mural of Old King Cole measuring 30 feet (9.1 m) wide. An L-shaped restaurant, with a flower room. ran east and south of the lobby. It had a Caen stone cladding; a 22-foot-high (6.7 m) beamed ceiling modeled after the Palace of Fontainebleau; marble statues and tapestries on the walls; and two bronze-and-marble electric fountains by Frederick MacMonnies. Hung in the Flower Room was the mural "Masque of Flowers". (Note: The artist is variously cited as Charles Finn or James Wall Finn.)

The second floor was devoted to dining rooms in the original design. At the center of the second floor was a double-height ballroom measuring 50 by 105 feet (15 by 32 m). The ballroom had hardwood floors; copies of old portraits on the walls; and white, blue, and silver decorations. The adjoining foyer had satin velvet decoration with gold-painted pillars and a gold-leaf ornamented ceiling. There was also a nurse's hall and eight private dining rooms on that story. One of the private dining rooms was a "gold room" with gold cutlery for 48 guests, in addition to china from Sèvres.

During the 1920 alterations, the lobby spaces were removed, but a pink marble-clad elevator lobby was added on the ground floor. The lowest two stories were also converted to a retail condominium. Remnants from the original design include a vaulted ceiling above the elevator lobby, decorated with rosettes, but hidden above a dropped ceiling. When the hotel reopened in 2015, Charlie Palmer was hired to operate Jake's @ The Knick, a "grab-and-go" takeout eatery on the ground level. The rebuilt ground floor has a 16-foot-tall (4.9 m) vaulted ceiling with decorative tiles similar to those installed in the subway.

==== Upper stories ====
Original floor plans for the upper floors

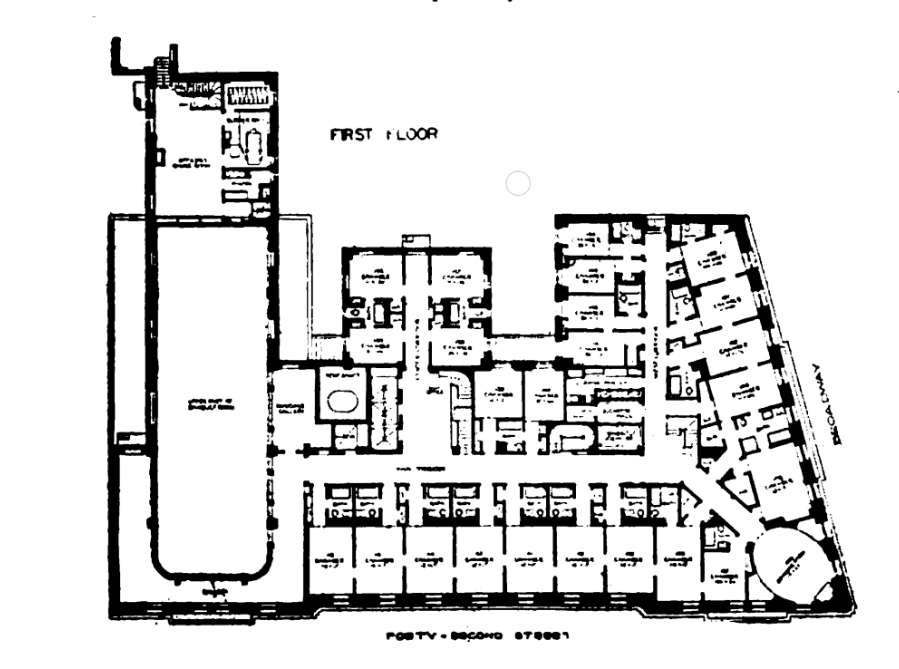
Third floor (labeled as first (Note: These were characterized in Architects' and Builders' Magazine 1906, pp. 92–93, as being the first through thirteenth suite floors. The floor numbering excluded the two stories at the base, which contained no suites.))

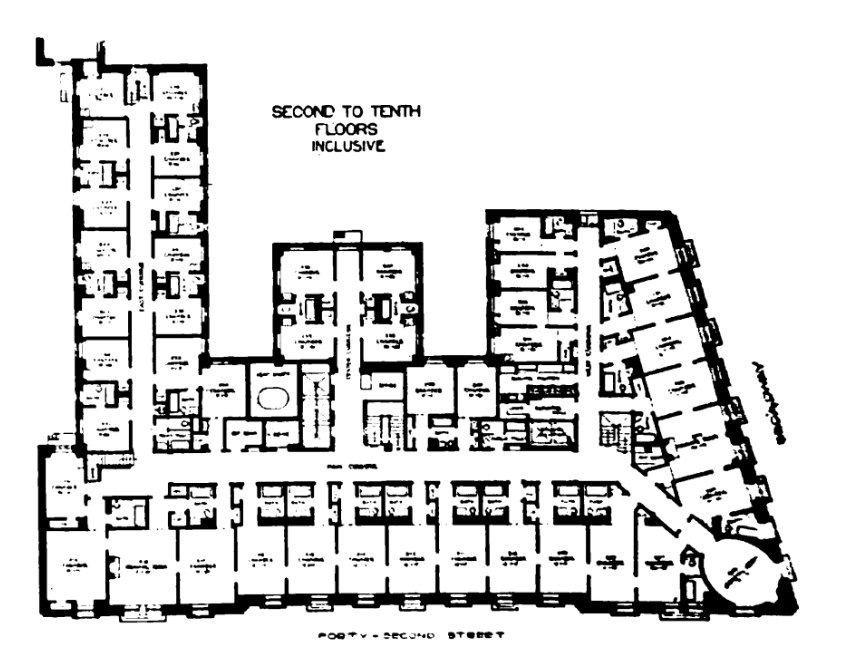
Fourth through twelfth floors (labeled as second through tenth)

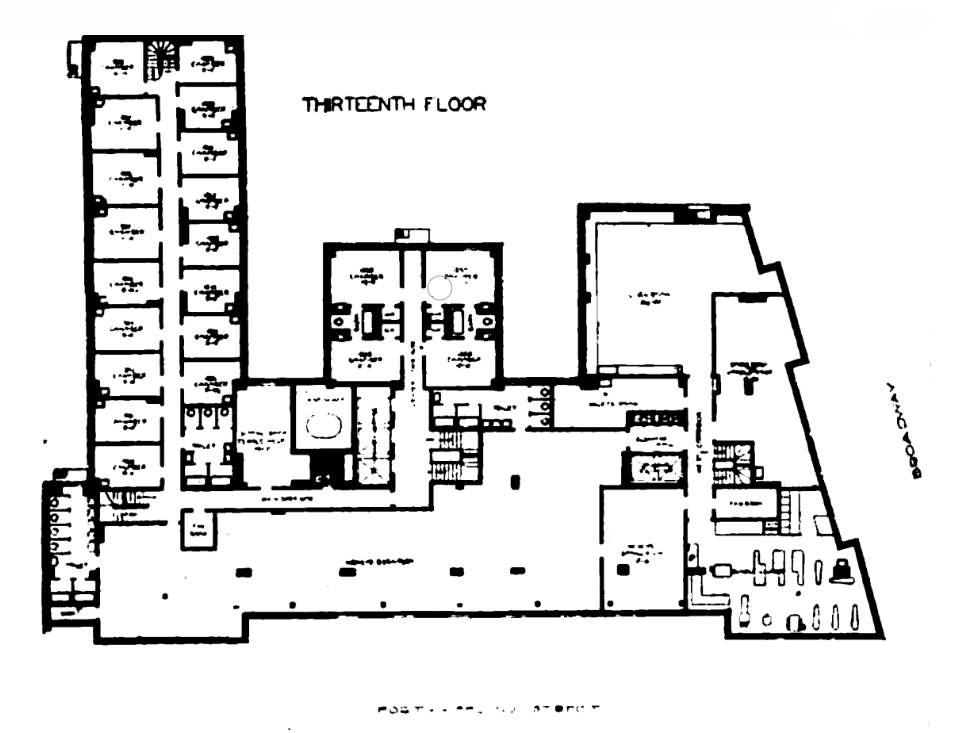
Fifteenth floor (labeled as thirteenth)

The third through fifteenth stories were originally devoted to residences and suites. The original third story contained suites, a ballroom, and a musician's gallery. The fourth through twelfth stories were designed nearly identically, while the thirteenth and fourteenth stories were slightly different in arrangement. The fifteenth story also contained a large women's dormitory and sitting room, a valet's room, a linen room, a bundle laundry room, a fan ventilator, and a storage and upholstery department. As floor number 13 is skipped, the thirteenth story is actually labeled as floor 14. Each story was served by its own staff and clerk.

The fourth floor of the reconverted hotel contains Charlie Palmer at the Knick, a 100-seat full-service restaurant. The sixteenth floor contains a 7,800-square-foot (720 m^{2}) bar called St. Cloud, also operated by Palmer, with a rooftop terrace measuring 4,000 square feet (370 m^{2}). The bar, named after the former hotel on the same site, is used for viewings of the Times Square Ball drop, which takes place at the neighboring One Times Square during New Year's Eve. Due to the proximity of the ball, which is only about 150 feet (46 m) from the Knickerbocker's rooftop, tickets to the New Year's Eve ball drop viewings can cost tens of thousands of dollars per person. St. Cloud has three skypods overlooking the ball, each of which can fit 17 to 20 visitors and were converted from the bases of old flag poles.

== History ==
=== Construction ===
In 1901, the New York City Department of Buildings received plans for three hotels, one theater, and fourteen apartment buildings on Times Square. Among those plans was a 14-story hotel designed by Bruce Price and Martin & Davis, to be built on the site of the St. Cloud Hotel at Broadway and 42nd Street. The new hotel, known as the Knickerbocker, was intended as a rival to the Hotel Astor, also owned by the Astor family. The Knickerbocker was to be a Renaissance Revival hotel with a similar arrangement to other hotels of the time. In addition to service facilities across two basement levels and dining and banquet facilities on the first and second floors, the Hotel Knickerbocker was planned with 600 suites and 300 baths. At the time, the section of Broadway between 34th and 42nd streets was quickly being developed with theaters and hotels. Consequently, the Hotel Knickerbocker's construction spurred the development of other hostelries nearby.

John Jacob Astor IV leased the hotel to the International Realty and Construction Company (IRCC) of Philadelphia, organized by J.E. and A.L. Pennock. Astor stipulated that the hotel had to be completed for at least $2 million. The IRCC received the contract for the hotel's construction in December 1901, and Astor loaned $1.65 million to the IRCC in March 1902. (Note: Equivalent to $47 million in 2025) Under the IRCC, the project began in 1901 or 1902. Under the contract between Astor and the IRCC, Astor reserved the right to name the hotel operator when it was complete. James B. Regan, former manager of the adjacent Pabst Hotel, leased the site from the IRCC for seventeen years in July 1902. Regan had formed the Knickerbocker Hotel Company (KHC), serving as the KHC's managing director with Jesse Lewisohn and Godfrey Hyams as co-directors. Astor contracted Regan to be the hotel's manager when it was finished, but Regan resigned from the KHC over disputes with the other directors.

In February 1904, just as the facade and steel skeleton was completed, construction was halted after the IRCC defaulted on its payments. Contractually, the IRCC was given a year to repay its outstanding obligations should it choose to resume construction. In the meantime, Astor commissioned new plans for the interior design. During this time, the only revenue from the Hotel Knickerbocker was coming from the billboards around it. At the time, the public did not know why work had stopped. The neighborhood had also changed significantly, and the original plans no longer fit with the surroundings. The IRCC never returned to the project and, in May 1905, Astor hired Trowbridge & Livingston to complete the interiors, with work resuming the following month. Regan also agreed to lease the hotel for twenty years at $300,000 per year. The new plans cost $1 million more than the original proposal and included an additional story. Part of the third story was demolished to make way for the double-story ballroom. The 42nd Street facade was also modified to include a portico. The hotel ultimately cost $3.5 million. (Note: Equivalent to $67 million in 2025)

=== Original hotel operation ===
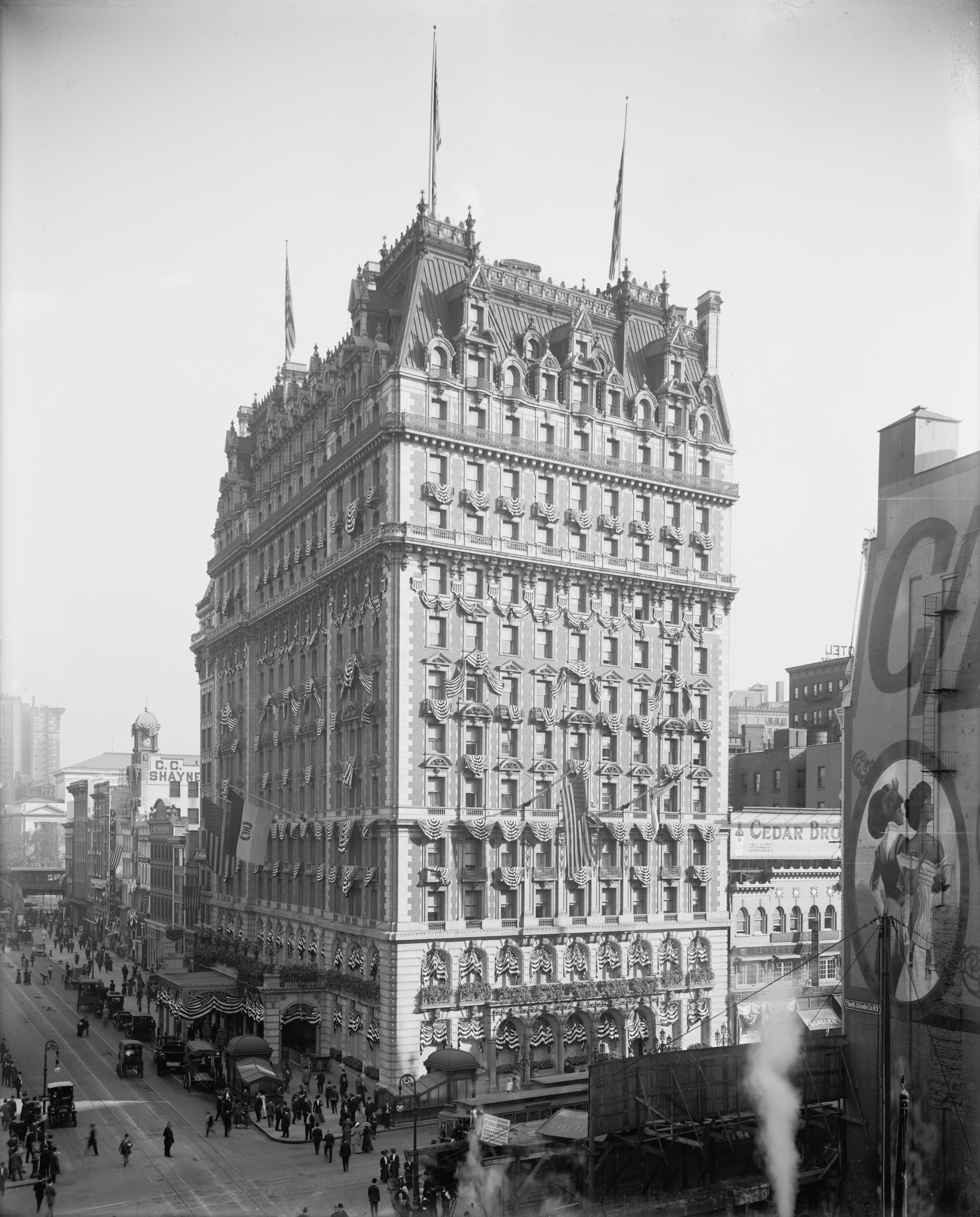
Seen from Seventh Avenue circa 1909

The Knickerbocker opened to private guests on October 23, 1906, and to the general public the following day. Astor wanted the Knickerbocker to compete with luxury hotels on Fifth Avenue, although the prices at the Knickerbocker were much cheaper. At the time of the hotel's opening, a room for one person averaged about $3.25 per day, (Note: Equivalent to $116 in 2025 (Note: 1634–1699: McCusker, J. J. (1997). How Much Is That in Real Money? A Historical Price Index for Use as a Deflator of Money Values in the Economy of the United States: Addenda et Corrigenda (PDF). American Antiquarian Society. 1700–1799: McCusker, J. J. (1992). How Much Is That in Real Money? A Historical Price Index for Use as a Deflator of Money Values in the Economy of the United States (PDF). American Antiquarian Society. 1800–present: Federal Reserve Bank of Minneapolis. "Consumer Price Index (estimate) 1800–".)) while suites cost about $15–20 per day. (Note: Equivalent to between $143 and $179 in 2025) The hotel quickly became part of the city's social scene. One week after the hotel's opening, it was receiving an influx of guests from the subway. By early 1907, Architectural Record said the hotel "has proved to be a huge popular success". Architectural historian Robert A. M. Stern wrote the Hotel Knickerbocker, along with the nearby Astor and Rector hotels, "created something of an architectural ensemble clustered around Times Square". Regan also began providing free toiletries to guests without baggage in 1907, and he even allowed guests to borrow formal attire for dinners.

The Armenonville restaurant, a 600-seat cafe on the ground floor, opened in June 1908. The 42nd Street frontage was slightly rebuilt in 1910 when 42nd Street was widened, and the Armenonville restaurant was renovated. In 1911, the Knickerbocker expanded into the neighboring Ryan Hotel, adding about one hundred more suites. After John Jacob Astor IV died on the Titanic in 1912, his son Vincent Astor inherited the hotel, which continued to run successfully under James B. Regan. The Knickerbocker's heyday coincided with the rise of Times Square as the city's main theater district, with nearly 35,000 seats across 28 theaters by 1910.

==== Residents and events ====
The Hotel Knickerbocker's residents included Metropolitan Opera singer Enrico Caruso, who took up a suite on half a story because of the hotel's proximity to the Metropolitan Opera House. When the end of World War I was falsely announced on November 8, 1918, Caruso led the crowd outside his suite in singing "The Star-Spangled Banner"; he repeated the performance on Armistice Day three days later, when the war actually ended. The actor and composer George M. Cohan also lived there. Other guests and residents included opera singer Geraldine Farrar, baritone Antonio Scotti, film director and producer D. W. Griffith, novelist F. Scott Fitzgerald, as well as numerous politicians and diplomats. The Tammany Hall political organization often held its meetings at the Hotel Knickerbocker, and media magnate William Randolph Hearst launched his failed campaign for the 1909 New York City mayoral election at the Knickerbocker. Harry Frazee, owner of the Boston Red Sox baseball team, devised his plan to sell Babe Ruth to the New York Yankees at the Knickerbocker in 1919.

The popular hotel bar gained the nickname "The 42nd Street Country Club". According to a legend, the martini was invented at the Knickerbocker in 1912 by Martini di Arma di Taggia, a hotel bartender who mixed dry vermouth and gin for John D. Rockefeller. The legend was subsequently debunked as having originated from a 1972 book by John Doxat. The Hotel Knickerbocker was also rumored to be where the velvet rope line was invented. During dinnertime, staff used a red velvet rope to create a queue, then handed out plates to guests waiting outside. Meals were served on dishes made of gold. During Easter celebrations, the hotel's chef put live chicks in sugar eggs, and guests would dine while the chicks hatched onto the table.

The Hotel Knickerbocker was also the site of some high-profile incidents during its history. For instance, a chimpanzee dressed in human clothing walked into the lobby in 1918, prompting a panic. The next year, two men stole gems from a guest and attempted to escape through the basement, squirting tabasco sauce into the eyes of the responding patrolmen, who arrested the burglars anyway. There were also several murders at the Knickerbocker, including in 1912, when the hotel's in-house violinist Albert de Brahms killed his wife and tried to seal her body in plaster.

=== Office use ===
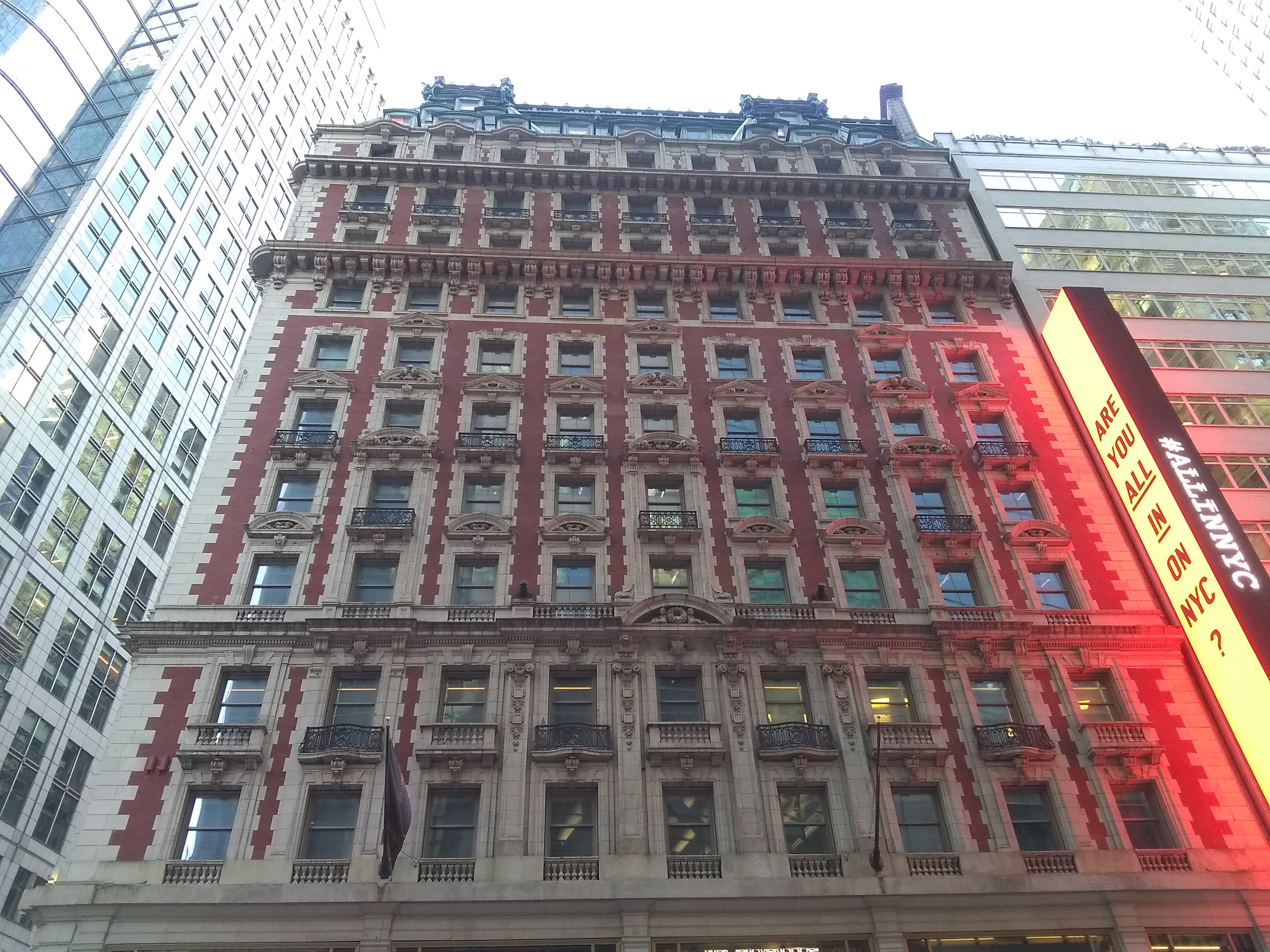
Broadway facade detail

The enactment of Prohibition in 1919 resulted in a marked decline in business at the Knickerbocker's restaurants and bars. By late 1919, Regan had given over operation of the hotel to his son, James E. Regan Jr., though the senior Regan retained the lease. In May 1920, the junior Regan announced the hotel would be closed at the end of the month and converted to an office building. Although the senior Regan's lease had more than fifteen years left to run, he surrendered it to Vincent Astor. At the time, the residents included James Regan Jr. and his wife Alice Joyce, as well as Caruso and his family. Immediately upon the announcement of the hotel's closure, several commercial tenants made bids for space in the Hotel Knickerbocker, and some applicants sought the entire building. At the time, the surrounding section of Broadway was quickly being developed for commercial purposes. The Hotel Knickerbocker closed on May 28, 1920.

==== 1920s to 1960s ====
Vincent Astor, Nicholas Biddle, and S. B. Thorn formed the Knickerbocker Holding Company on June 14, 1920, two weeks after the hotel's closure. The Bank for Savings loaned the company $3 million in October 1920 for the conversion of the old Hotel Knickerbocker into an office building. Astor hired architect Charles A. Platt to design the office conversion. The hotel interiors were completely gutted and the ground level was converted to fourteen storefronts. The rest of the building was rebuilt as an office building, with rents from $4 to $5 per square foot ($43 to $54/m^{2}). (Note: Equivalent to between $64 and $80 per square foot ($690 and $860/m^{2}) in 2025) The walls of the old suites were moved or removed. The grill room in the basement was leased in December 1920 and continued to operate after the hotel's closure. The Old King Cole painting was loaned to the Racquet and Tennis Club on Park Avenue by 1925 and was subsequently installed permanently at the St. Regis Hotel.

By early 1921, the old Hotel Knickerbocker had become known as the Knickerbocker Building, being used office space for six decades. While the storefront at the corner of Broadway and 42nd Street was quickly leased to a location of the National Drug Stores Corporation, the rest of the first floor was not leased until 1924, when it became a clothing store. The New York Society of Model Engineers' main room in the Knickerbocker Building housed a model train exhibition each year during the early 1930s. Other tenants included advertising firms, attorneys, and insurance companies. Over the years, the Knickerbocker Building's former function as a hotel was forgotten by the public; the name "Knickerbocker Hotel" even became associated with another subsequently shuttered hotel on 45th Street.

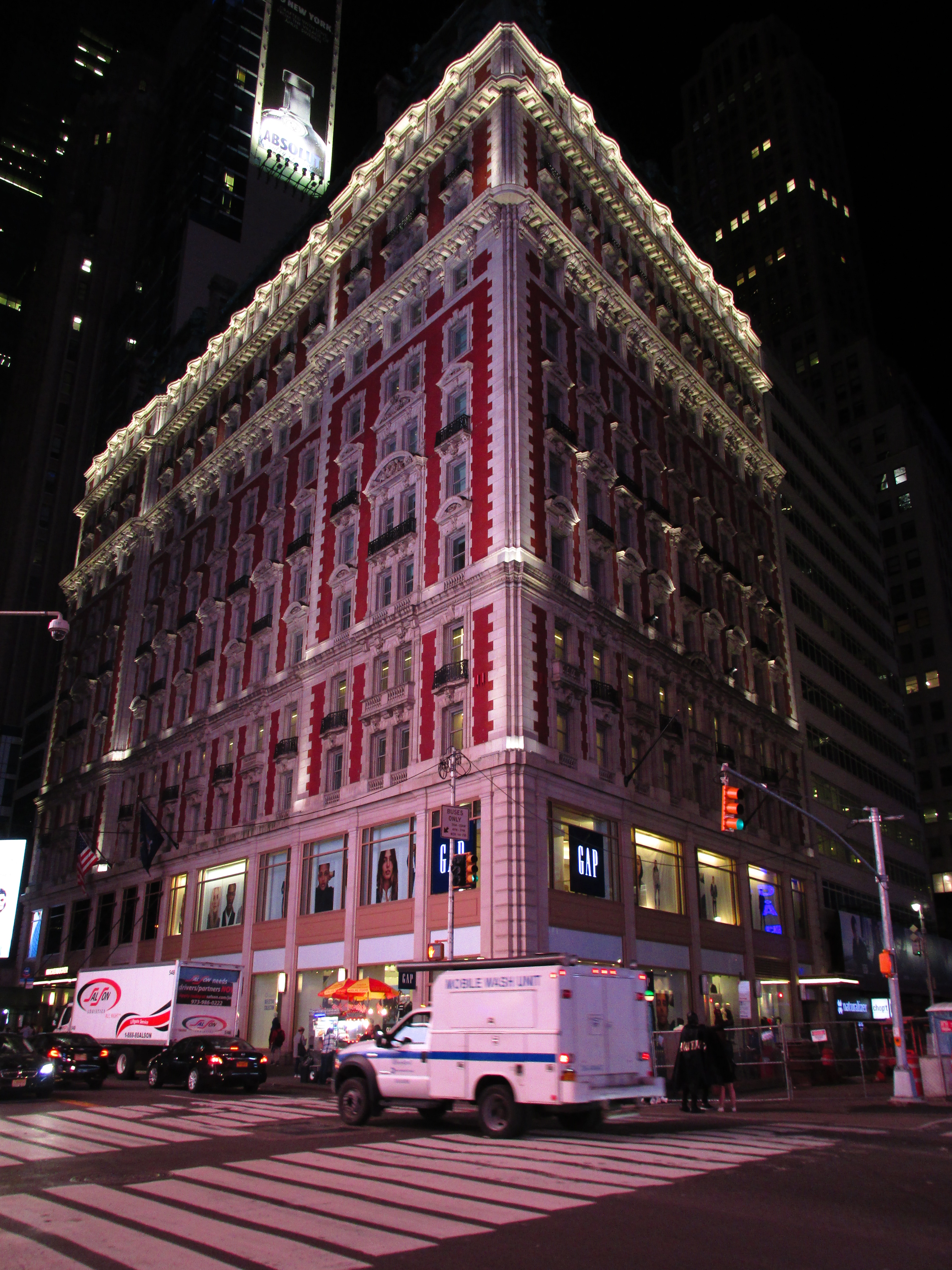
The hotel at night in 2015

When the Knickerbocker Building became the headquarters of Newsweek magazine in October 1940, it was renamed the Newsweek Building. Also in the 1940s, an employment agency and art office. The Ryan Hotel structure at 140 West 42nd Street, which had been part of the original Knickerbocker Hotel but not the subsequent office building, was sold in 1944 to an investor who intended to modify that structure heavily. Vincent Astor continued to own the Newsweek Building until 1957, until it was sold to a client of Bernard H. Kayden. The underlying land was simultaneously sold to Massachusetts Mutual Life Insurance, a subsidiary of Harry Helmsley's Helmsley-Spear company and Irving S. Wolper, for $2.75 million. In early 1959, Newsweek signed a lease for space on 444 Madison Avenue, with plans to move out of the Knickerbocker during the beginning of that May.

==== 1970s to 2000s ====
By the mid-1970s, the building was known as 150–152 West 42nd Street and 1462–1470 Broadway. Helmsley still operated the building, which contained offices, commercial shops, and a pornographic bookstore. The land was held by the Inch Corporation, a shell company representing the true owner, the British royal family. Helmsley announced that he would drop his ownership of the Knickerbocker Building in 1975, raising concerns that the building would be demolished. The other option was to renovate the space for $2 million, which could then be rented for $4.50 per square foot ($48.4/m^{2}). Instead, the building deed was sold for a nominal sum of $1, despite the building being valued at $4.5 million.

In 1979, with the office market in a slump, Helmsley, David Baldwin, and Jack Vickers were planning to convert the office building to residential lofts. As part of the project, Helmsley, Baldwin, and Vickers were to relocate the building's main entrance from 152 West 42nd Street to 1466 Broadway, constructing a new lobby on Broadway. Libby, Ross & Whitehouse designed the new lobby and converted the interior to 113 units. Stores and commercial space would have been on the lowest four stories while the other stories would have been residential lofts. The commercial market quickly recovered and the space was instead rented as showrooms and studios for companies in the Garment District. The building was listed on the National Register of Historic Places on April 11, 1980, and the New York City Landmarks Preservation Commission (LPC) designated the Knickerbocker Building as a landmark on October 18, 1988.

SL Green bought 1466 Broadway, along with several other Manhattan buildings owned by the Helmsley estate, in 1998 for $165 million. SL Green began renovating the building shortly afterward, in March 1999. At the time, the building contained a three-story location of The Gap at ground level; The Gap's billboards were prominently displayed on the facade. The Gap expanded its ground floor space from 15,000 to 35,000 square feet (1,400 to 3,300 m^{2}) during this time, reopening in mid-2001. SL Green sought to attract small office tenants to the top seven floors, so the company decided in late 2001 to rebrand the building as 6 Times Square, which it believed was a more prominent address. The facade was restored under SL Green's ownership. The mansard roof was coated with greenish copper. Due to the complexities of the renovation, its costs increased to three times the original budget, and the renovation was completed in March 2003, three and a half years later than originally scheduled. The interior was also not renovated at that time.

=== Reuse as hotel ===
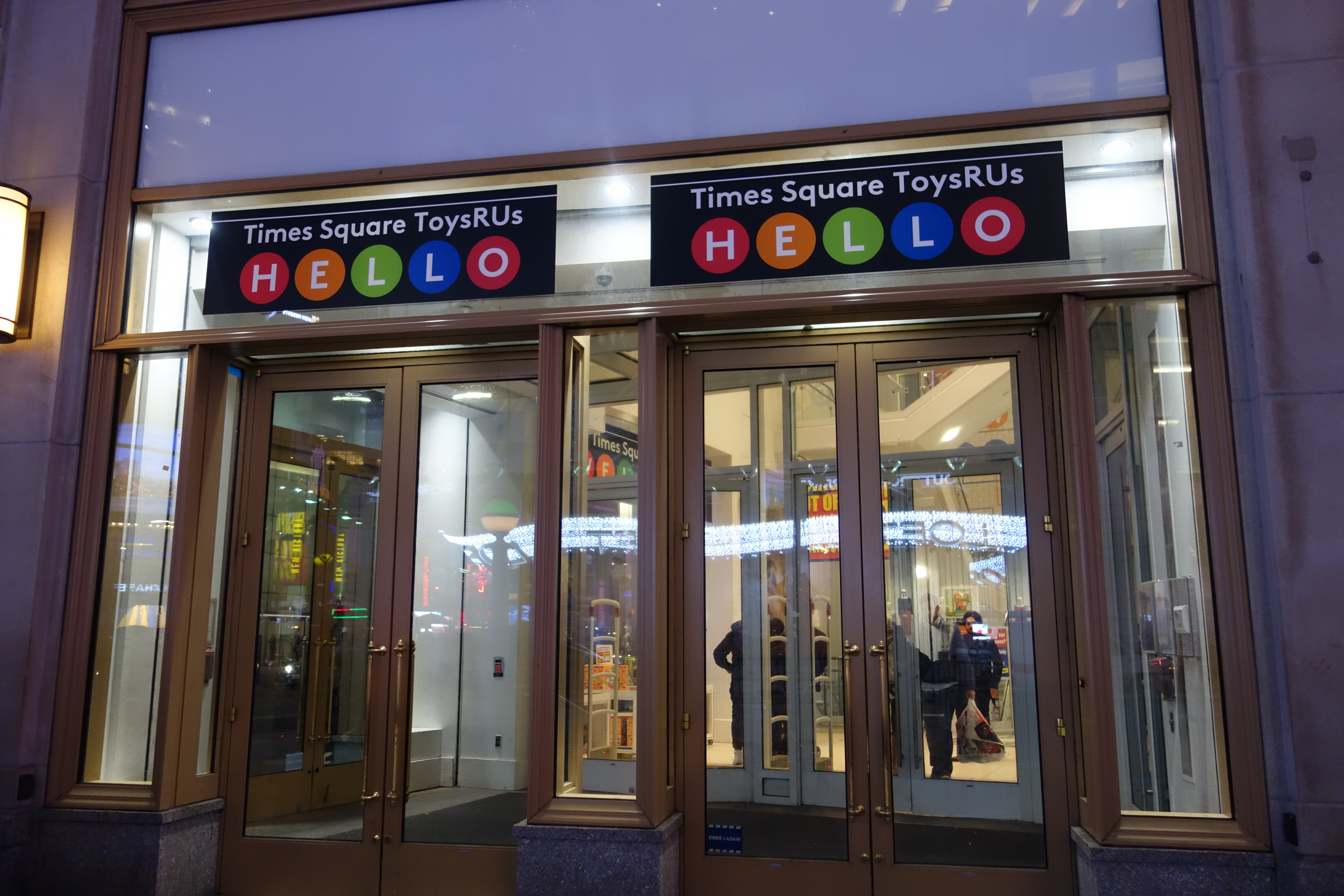
The pop up Toys "R" Us store at the building's base seen in 2018

In 2004, SL Green sold 6 Times Square to Sitt Asset Management for $160 million. Sitt sold the building in 2006 to Istithmar Hotels, an investment group from the royal family of Dubai, for $300 million. Istithmar announced plans to convert the building back into a five-star hotel with between 250 and 300 rooms. By late 2009, Istithmar was unable to fulfill its debt obligation. Istithmar surrendered the property to its lender, Danske Bank, in March 2010. Danske subsequently resold the building to a joint venture of Highgate Holdings, Ashkenazy Acquisitions, and Stanley Chera.

FelCor Lodging Trust, a Texas real estate investment trust, acquired a 95 percent stake in the third through sixteenth floors for $109 million. The purchase took place in late 2011, although the acquisition was not announced until February 2012. The retail condominium on the first two floors was still owned by Ashkenazy. FelCor renovated the property for an additional $115 million, completely gutting it, with the exception of the facade. The hotel's new interior was designed by architecture and interior design firm Gabellini Sheppard Associates, with Peter Poon Architects as the architect of record. The new design was intended to both evoke the original hotel and represent Times Square's 21st-century revival. In a gesture to the hotel's history, the four signature suites were named the Caruso, Cohan, Martini, and Parrish suites, after prominent personalities of the old hotel. The LPC had to approve the renovation plans, which involved modifying the facade and adding a light court.

The hotel reopened on February 12, 2015, as the Knickerbocker Hotel; room rates were on the higher end for New York City hotels, renting for over $500 a night. The rooftop bar, the St. Cloud, opened in June 2015. The old subway entrance in the basement remained shuttered, and several of the original hotel's works of art, such as Old King Cole, were not restored in the renovated Knickerbocker Hotel. The ground level of the Knickerbocker Hotel building continued to house commercial uses, such as one of the last-ever locations of Toys "R" Us, which operated as a pop-up location in 2017 and 2018. Charlie Palmer opened Akoya, a sushi restaurant, in the hotel in April 2025.

== Critical reception ==
After the Knickerbocker Hotel reopened in 2015, it received mixed commentary. A critic for British newspaper The Daily Telegraph gave the Knickerbocker a 7/10 rating, saying that the hotel "adds a pinch of sophistication to Times Square. Yet, with its sleek, low-slung furnishings and neutral palette, the interiors are the antithesis of Beaux Arts, and Bellhops in baggy knickerbockers and chunky Doc Martens set the tone the moment you arrive." A reviewer for Oyster.com also contrasted the hotel's Renaissance-style exterior and modern interior, saying: "Some guests find this minimalist style cold and uninviting, especially paired with the lack of seating in the lobby." A reviewer for Fodor's said the hotel provided a "serene counterpoint to the mass of people, lights, and excitement that converge at the crossroads of Broadway and 42nd Street". A critic for Business Insider wrote in 2020: "It's comparable in price to other big brand hotels but offers a sleeker, more boutique vibe, with upscale rooms and five-star service." Visitors also praised the hotel's central location, large rooms, and rooftop bar, but criticized the fact that it lacked a pool and a spa.

Retrospectively, the writer Robert A. M. Stern and the co-authors of his 2025 book New York 2020 wrote that the Knickerbocker was "the most architecturally distinguished of the Times Square hotels" that had opened in the early 21st century, despite the Knickerbocker's early-20th-century roots. The Knickerbocker Hotel is also a member of The Leading Hotels of the World, a marketing organization for luxury hotels.

== See also ==
- List of New York City Designated Landmarks in Manhattan from 14th to 59th Streets
- National Register of Historic Places listings in Manhattan from 14th to 59th Streets
