= MinNature =

Malaysian miniature art gallery

MinNature Malaysia
- Formerly: MinNature
- Company type: Private limited company
- Industry: Tourism, Education
- Founded: 2014
- Founder: Wan Cheng Huat
- Headquarters: Kuala Lumpur, Malaysia
- Number of locations: 1
- Key people: Wan Cheng Huat, Janice Chin and Chan Chee Wing
- Website: minnature.com

MinNature Malaysia (previously known as MinNature) is a miniature art gallery which focuses on Malaysia's culture and heritage. It houses thousands of sculptures crafted mostly by hand in buildings and structures mostly 3D-printed. It is situated inside Sungei Wang Plaza, Kuala Lumpur, spread over thirteen thousand square feet and divided into eight zones.

== History ==
The founder, Wan Cheng Huat, first thought of this concept idea to have a miniature world way back in 2008. It was inspired by the world's largest miniature train exhibition, Miniatur Wunderland in Hamburg, Germany. He and cofounder Nicholas Ong took over five years to fund raise the first gallery which was built in Summit USJ, Selangor, in 2014.

The 3D design and 3D print works started in June 2014 and it took over two years to completely fabricate all of the models for the first phase. The in situ construction and assembly started mid-March 2016 and was completed in November 2016. Over 88 people were involved with the first gallery construction. The gallery in Summit USJ operated from 2016 till 2019.

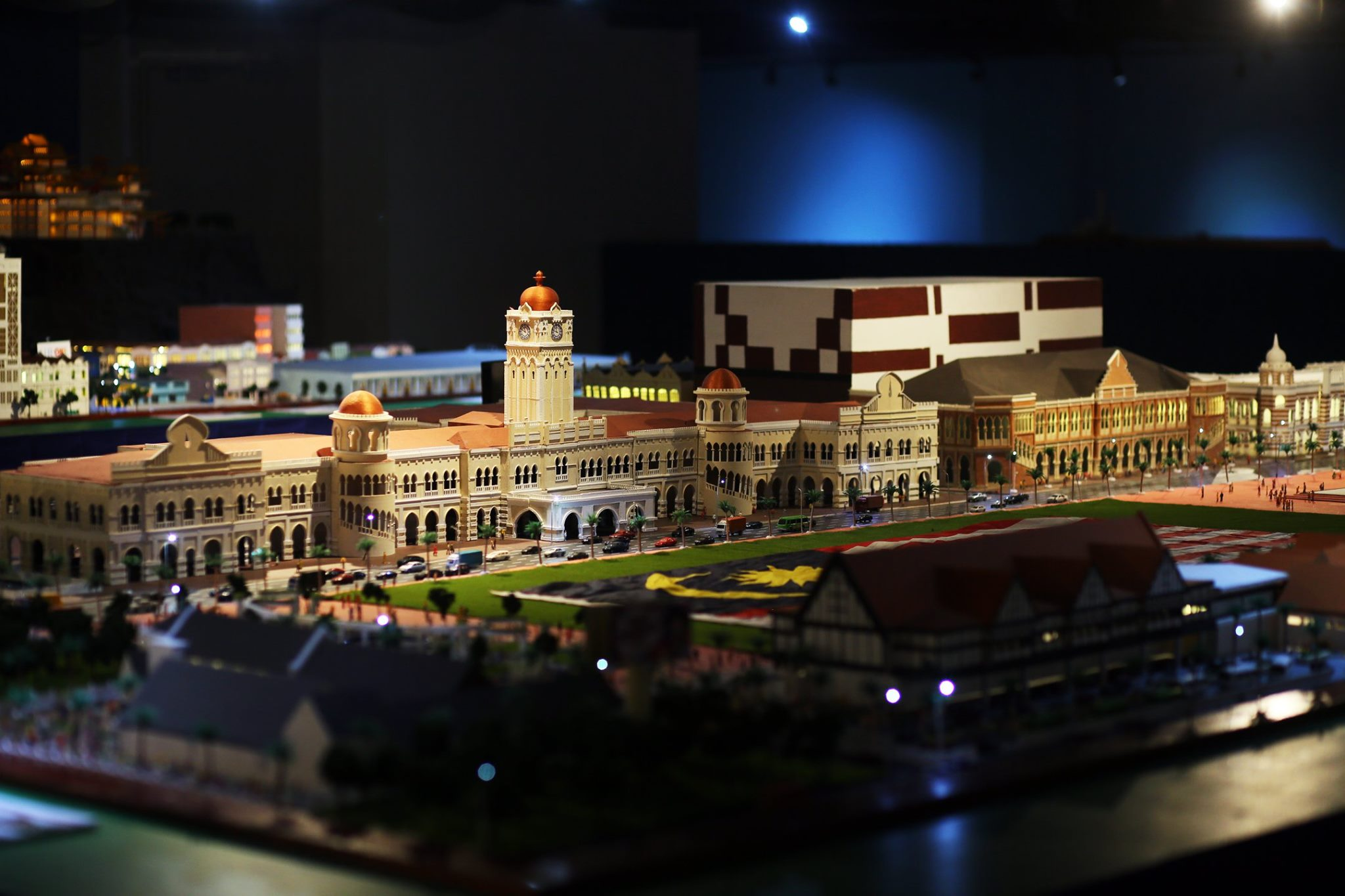
Centerpiece Dataran at MinNature Malaysia

Works for the second gallery at Sungei Wang Plaza started back in October 2018 and renovation started in July 2019. Over 40 people were involved, with most work by seven of the core team:

1. Wan Cheng Huat
2. Janice Chin
3. Chan Chee Wing
4. Tan Hon Sen
5. Ng Jef Fre
6. Brian Tan
7. Eric Siow

The first phase of the second gallery opened on 29 February 2020 and was mostly closed after 18 March 2020 due to the COVID-19 lockdown.

The MinNature Masterbuilders uses a mixture of traditional craftsmanship and technology to create all their miniature pieces.

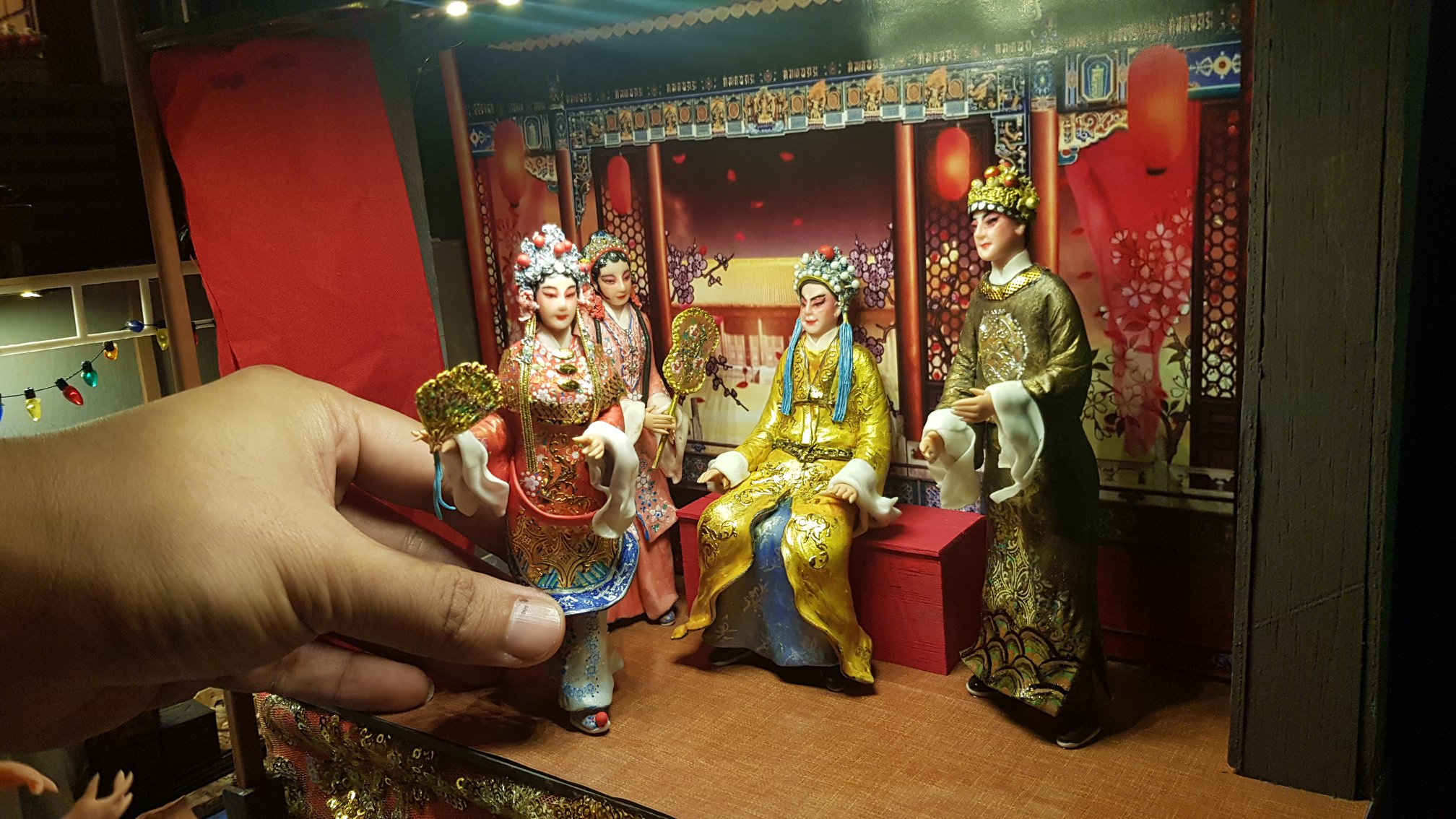
Craftsman placing in miniature into display
