= Northlandz =

American model railroad museum

Coordinates: 40.5171°N 74.8193°W

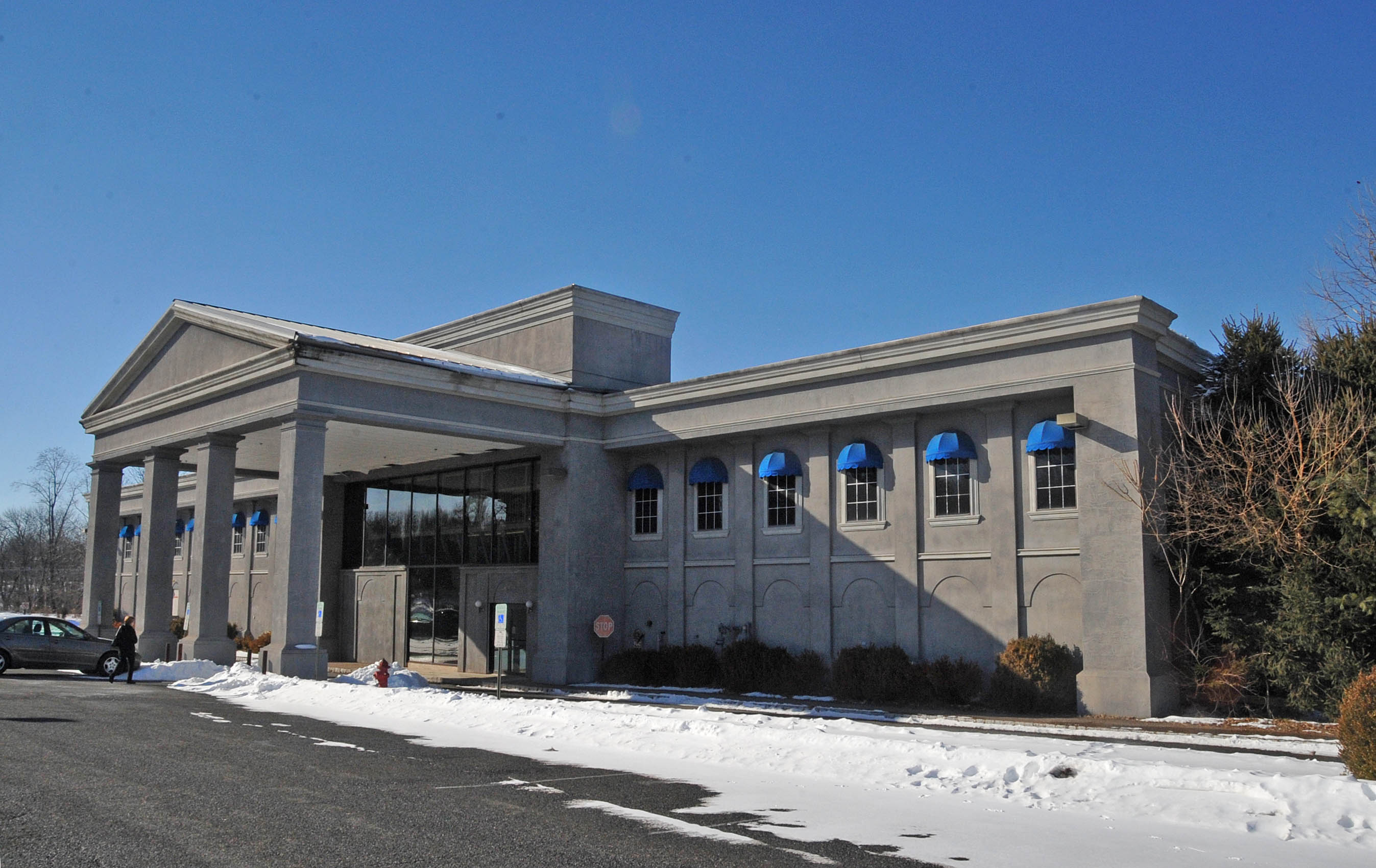
- Exterior of Northlandz
- Established: 1996
- Location: Raritan Township, New Jersey
- Collection size: Railroad model trains and dolls
- Website: www.northlandz.com

Northlandz is a model railroad layout and museum located in Raritan Township, New Jersey, built by Bruce Williams Zaccagnino. It spans over 50,000 feet of track and was awarded with the Guinness World Record of longest small-scale model railway track in 1997. In 2005 the Miniatur Wunderland in Hamburg, Germany established a new world record.

== History ==
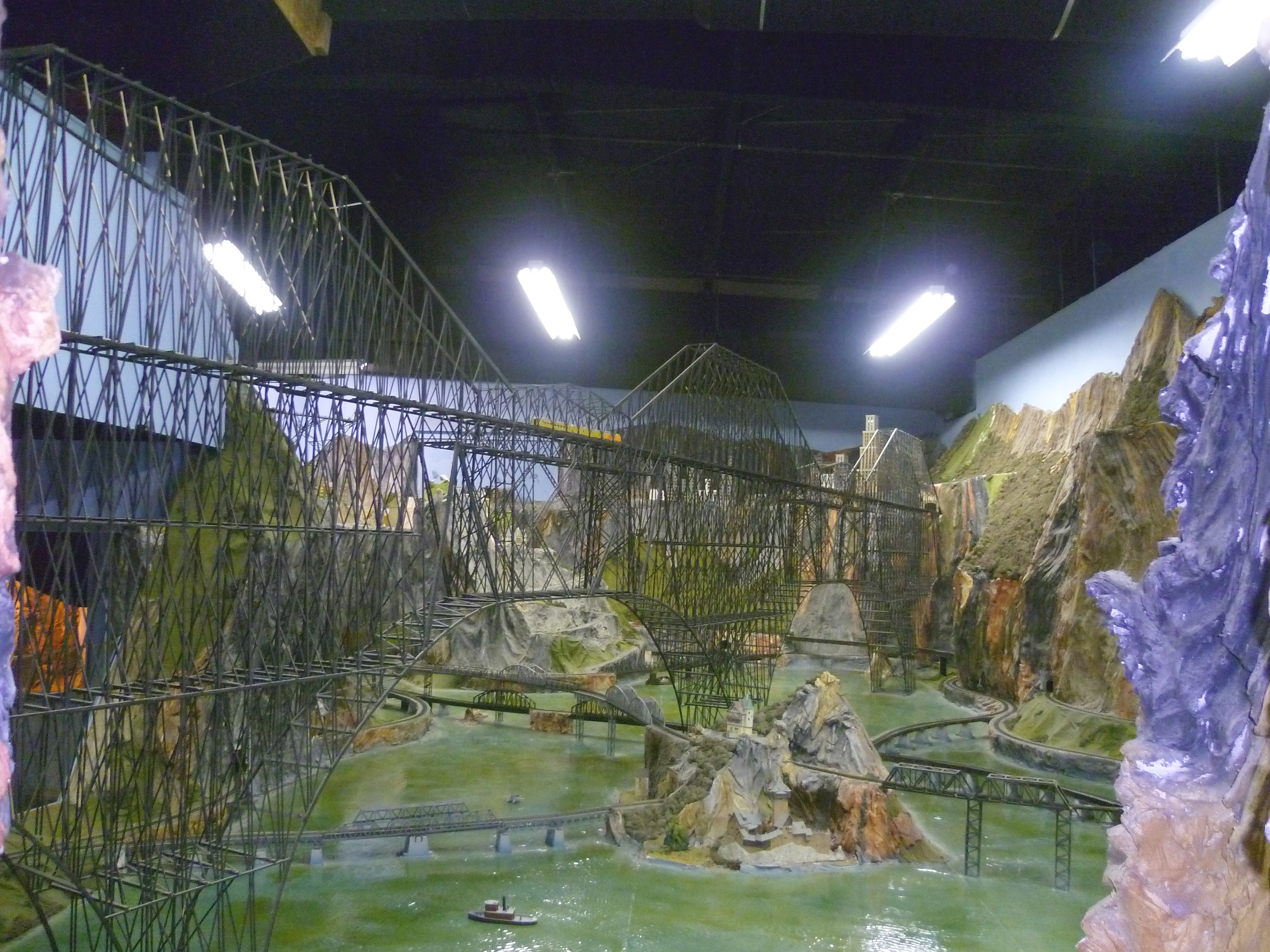
View over some of the many Northlandz Bridges

The railroads that now make up Northlandz were originally built by Bruce Williams Zaccagnino in the basement of his home in Three Bridges, New Jersey, and then transferred to their current location in Flemington in 1991. He then continued to build up the site throughout the 1990s.

An eleven-minute short documentary film, Some Kind of Quest, documents the origins of the site.

When Zaccagnino retired, the premises changed hands and were almost demolished. However, the new owner, Tariq Sohail, marveled by the layout's spectacular details and scenery, ultimately decided to retain it. The renovated site opened in October 2019.

== Layout ==
Northlandz itself differs from other model railroad exhibitions of its kind by spanning vertical distance rather than horizontal. The 100+ trains present in the site cross over varied landscapes constructed to show off not only the trains themselves but also the scenery around them. The site also includes a functional railroad outside of the building.
