= Highland Park Society of Model Railroad Engineers =

Model railroad engineers club group society

The Highland Park Society of Model Railroad Engineers, also known as the Highland Pacific Model Railroad Club, is a group of like-minded individuals that currently operates a large HO scale layout of a fictional railroad known as the Highland Pacific. The club is supported by some 30 members.

Founded in April 1948, the club is one of the older and better-known model railroad clubs in the Los Angeles area. Many railroad clubs lease or borrow the space for their railroad layout. In 1956, the club lost its original home in what used to be Al's Hobby Shop in Highland Park, California. Vowing to never lose their home again, the club members purchased a home in San Gabriel, California in 1960 and converted the home into the club as it is today.

The club has been featured on KTLA Morning News with Gayle Anderson and has appeared in major model railroading magazines.

The principal goal of the Society is the construction of a fun-to-operate model railroad which includes a variety of operational possibilities for all members, complete with eye-catching scenery.
