= Modelbane Europa =

Model Railway attraction in Denmark

Coordinates: 56.3277°N 10.0475°E

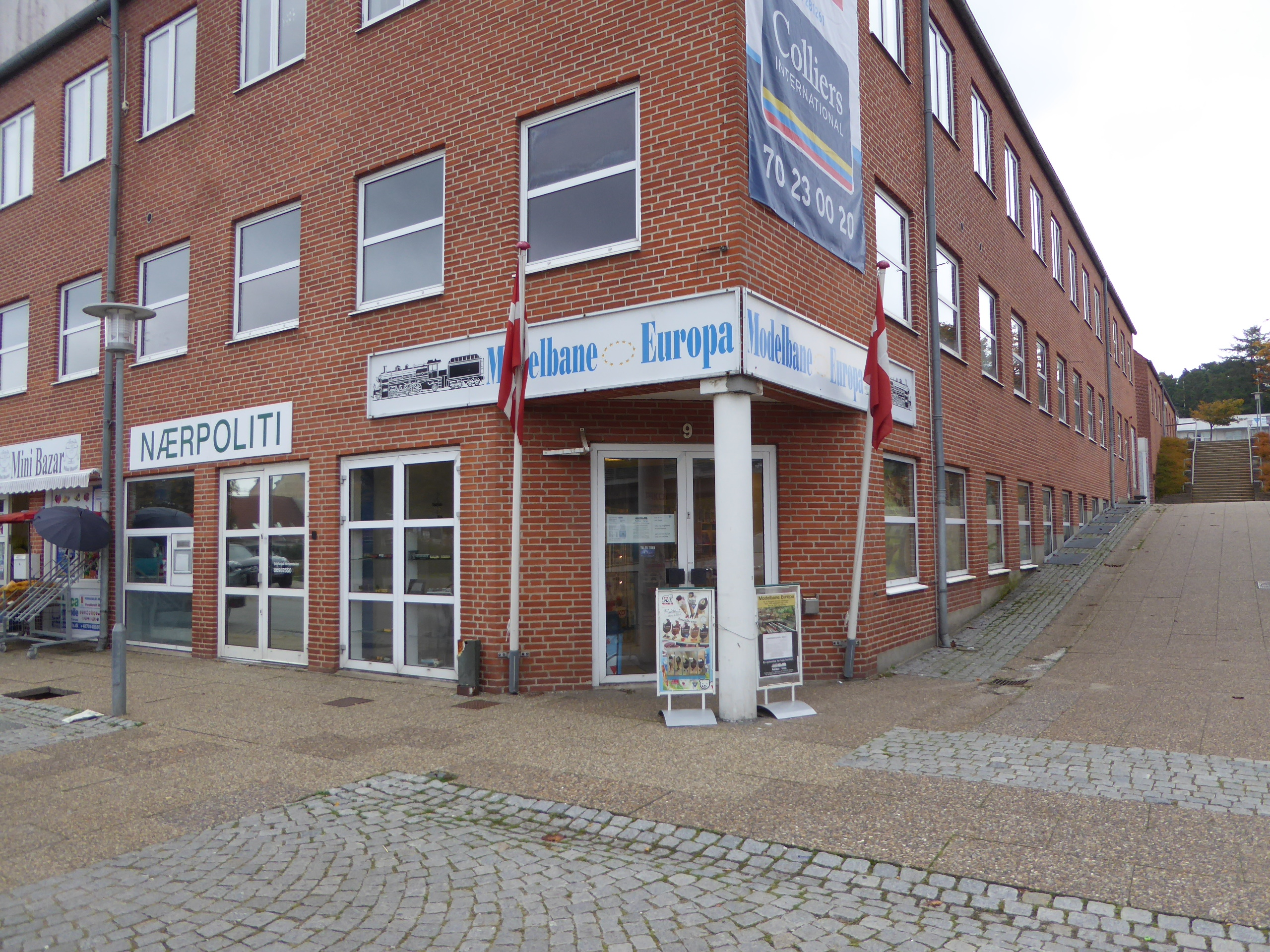
- Modelbane Europa
- Industry: Model railway
- Founded: 1996
- Headquarters: Hadsten, Denmark
- Website: http://www.modelbaneeuropa.dk

Modelbane Europa is a model railway attraction in Hadsten, Denmark, and one of the largest of its kind in Europe, built by a local foundation. In November 2014, the railway consisted of at least 1,100 metres (3,609 ft) of track in HO scale, divided into two sections: Denmark and Germany. The model takes 150 m² (1,614 sq ft) of floorspace.
