= Sydney Live Steam Locomotive Society =

Australian miniature railway organization

The Sydney Live Steam Locomotive Society was formed in 1948 and built a miniature railway along a drainage channel behind houses on Anthony Road, West Ryde, Sydney, Australia. The site has been transformed by the addition of fill from excavation work during widening of the local railway line and the society has grown and now operates a miniature railway on the site with a 400m long elevated track of 2 1/2 inch, 3 1/2 inch and 5 inch gauge, and two 300m long ground level 5 inch railways.

The Society operates miniature steam locomotives which represent prototype engines of the New South Wales Government Railways and other states. One can also see a variety of other prototype locomotives. The locomotives work hard hauling 6 car trains with up to 30 persons. A 10 lever mechanical ex New South Wales Government Railways ground frame operates elevated swing stub points and lower quadrant signals on the elevated railway and a 48 miniature (Westinghouse style) lever frame operates the ground level railway's motor points and colour light signals. Members practice their model engineering in the creation of miniature steam locomotives, truly representative of the prototype.

A booklet detailing the history of the society was produced to celebrate the 50 years of their operation

The club owns the second oldest miniature steam locomotive in Australia, known as The Old Girl.

== See also ==
- List of ridable miniature railways
