= Bell code =

Sounds used on passenger trains for communication between the driver and guard

Bell codes, buzzer codes or Communication Signal Appliance codes entail a series of bells or buzzers used on passenger trains for communication between the driver and guard.

== Great Britain and India ==
Signal	Meaning in Great Britain	Meaning in India
1	Stop	Stop train
1—1		Zone of speed restriction over, resume prescribed speed
1—2	Close doors	
2	Ready to start	Start train
2—2	Do not open doors	Passing automatic signal at 'on'
3	Set Back	Guard required by driver
3—1	Lock central door locking	
3—2—1	Testing doors	
3—3	Guard required by driver, or guard or driver to speak on the telephone	Guard's warning when the motorman exceeds the speed prescribed
3—3—1	Release central door locking	
4	Slow down	Protect train in rear
5	Driver/Guard leaving the train	
6	Draw forward	
9	Police assistance required	

All codes, except 3—2—1, must be acknowledged by repeating the code received.

== Japan ==
In Japan, these are known as In-Car Communication Signals (Japanese: 車内連絡合図, romanized: Shanai renraku aizu). Each code must be acknowledged by the receiver. Examples of common railway bell codes are:

Signal	Meaning
• • — • •	Buzzer Test
•	Buzzer is OK
—	Am I clear to proceed?
• • •	The indicator light does not illuminate
• •	Prepare to stop at the next station
•	Acknowledgement for • •
• • —	Please correct your stopping position
• —	There is a problem
• — •	Secure the train and track
— • • —	Driver and conductor to confer
— • —	Power outage
Fast Tapping	Cancel the last message sent

== United States ==
In the United States, these are known as Communication Signal Appliance codes.

Signal	Meaning
_	When running, stop at once.
_	When standing, apply or release brakes.
o o	When standing, start.
o o o	When standing or running backward, back up two car lengths.
o o o	When running forward, stop at next passenger station.
o o o o	When standing, brakes have applied and released on rear car. Brake test completed.
o	When spotting, switching, or making up trains, prepare to stop.

== See also ==
- Whistle codes - used by locomotives to communicate with signal boxes
