= New York Society of Model Engineers =

Organization in New York City

The New York Society of Model Engineers (NYSME) is an American 501(c)(3) non-profit organization dedicated to the promotion of the model engineering, model railroading, and the preservation of American railroad history. Formed in 1926, it is the oldest model railroad Society in America. It is located in Carlstadt, New Jersey.

In 2025, the organization claimed total expenses of $23,750, total revenue of $31,789, and total assets of $217,170.

== History ==
The Society was originally formed in 1926 in New York City. In its early years, the organization moved to various locations throughout Manhattan. Members were interested in all types of model building, with model trains being a division of the organization. They were also known for building miniatures and models of steam engines, boats, automobiles, airplanes, buildings, as well as mechanical and electrical items.

In 1934, the Society was incorporated under the laws of the State of New York. During this time, the Society also began construction of its first Model Railroad, "The Union Connecting." Over the next twenty years, the Society moved from its original location to two other locations. Each move doubled the size of the previous location and the size of the model train layout.

During WW II, many Society members were called to service in the Armed Forces. Upon their return from the war, members of the Society searched for a new location and received an invitation from the Lackawanna Railroad to move into their Passenger Terminal in Hoboken, NJ. They had the space for what would become the largest model railroad in the world at that time: the ornate waiting room for the recently discontinued ferry boats to 23rd Street in New York City. Here, the layout was built. It was based on the Lackawanna Railroad from Hoboken to Scranton, PA. During the early-1950s the organization moved to its current location in Carlstadt, New Jersey.

Today, The organization features two operating model railroad displays. One railroad, The Union Connecting, models two rail "O"-Scale (1/4" to the foot). The other railroad, The Union, Hoboken, and Overland, models "HO" scale (3.5mm to the foot).

Full members of the Society are allowed to use all the facilities of the organization including extensive railroad library of video tapes, books, and magazines. Full members are also allowed free access to the Society's machine shop and tools. In addition, full members are allowed access to both "O" and "HO" scale layouts following the completion of training in control systems and operating the layouts. Both layouts are large and operate very similar to prototype railroad operations. New members are trained by more experienced members.
