= Miniatur Wunderland =

Largest model railway system in the world in Hamburg, Germany

Coordinates: 53°32′38″N 9°59′20″E

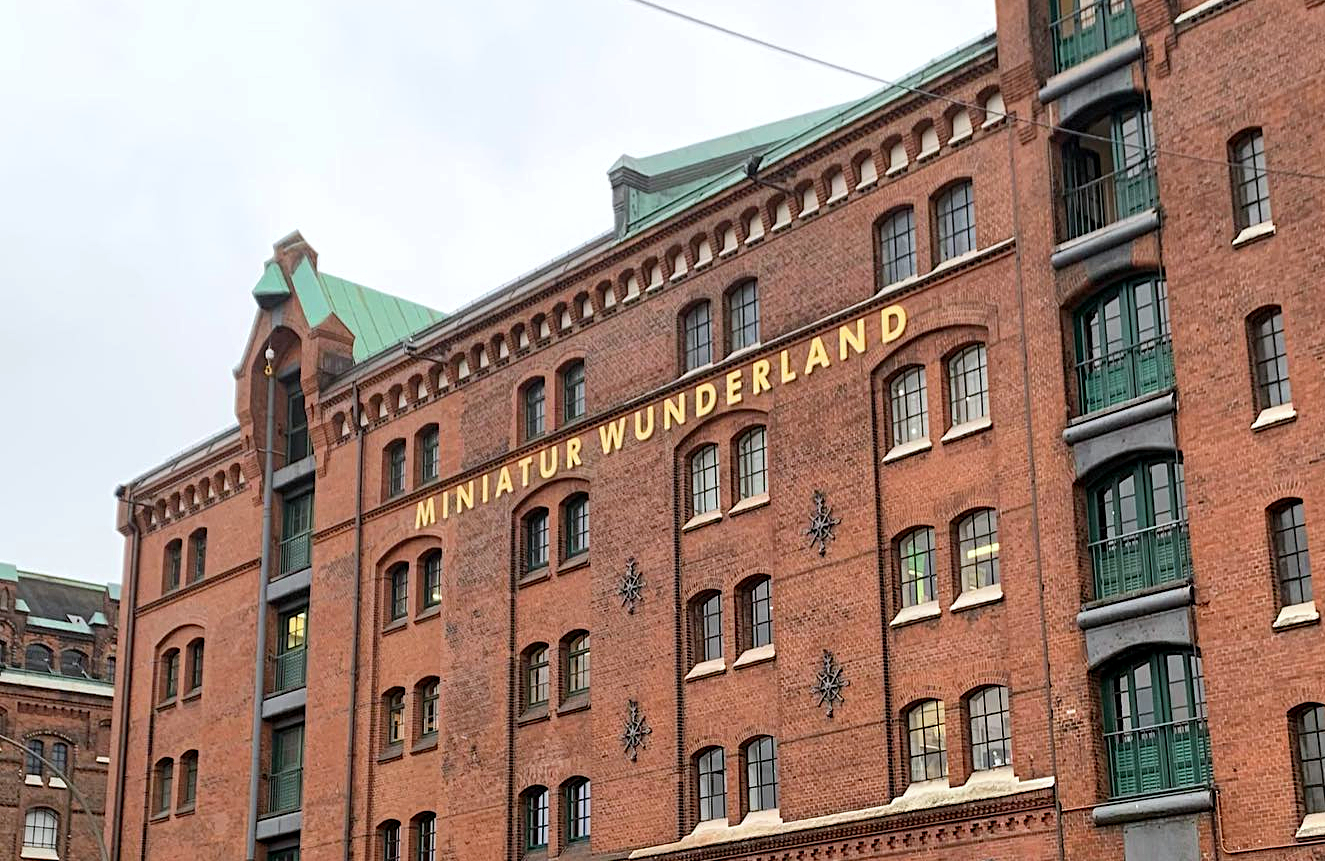
- Miniatur Wunderland at the Speicherstadt district of Hamburg
- Type: Limited liability company (Gesellschaft mit beschränkter Haftung)
- Industry: Model railway
- Founded: 4 January 2001; 25 years ago
- Headquarters: Hamburg, Germany
- Key people: Frederik & Gerrit Braun, Stephan Hertz
- Revenue: 42,7 Mio. Euro (2024)
- Number of employees: 448 (2024) (~ 300 FTE)
- Website: miniatur-wunderland.com

The Miniatur Wunderland (German for: Miniature Wonderland) is, according to Guinness World Records, the largest model railway system in the world. It is located at the historic Speicherstadt in Hamburg and is one of the most popular and most visited sights in Germany.

The exhibition includes around 1,230 digitally controlled trains with more than 12,000 wagons. The Wonderland is also designed with around 5,280 houses and bridges, more than 11,800 vehicles – of which around 350 drive independently on the installation – 52 airplanes and around 290,000 figures. The system features a recurring day-night lighting cycle and almost 500,000 built-in LED lights. Of the 10,000 m^{2} (107,639 sq ft) of floorspace, the models occupies 1,694 m^{2} (18,234 sq ft).

As of May 2025, the railway consisted of 16,491 m (54,104 ft) of track in H0 scale with 3,600 switches and 1,400 signals, divided into twelve sections: Harz mountains, the fictitious town of Knuffingen, the Alps and Austria, Hamburg, America, Scandinavia, Switzerland, a replica of Hamburg Airport, Italy, Rio de Janeiro, Patagonia and Monaco/Provence. Planning is also in progress for the construction of sections for Central America and the Caribbean and perhaps Great Britain.

== History ==
In the summer of 2000, Frederik Braun, one of the four founders of Miniatur Wunderland, was on vacation in Zurich. In a local model train store he came up with the idea for the world's largest model railway. Back in Hamburg, he searched for email addresses online and started a survey on the popularity of real and fictional sights of the city. In the process, the Miniatur Wunderland, which did not yet exist, was ranked 3 by male respondents.

According to Braun and his twin brother Gerrit, the initial idea and business plan for Miniatur Wunderland fit on just two pages. The financial backer was Hamburger Sparkasse.

The Miniatur Wunderland is controlled by the Delphi programming language.

== Construction and expansion ==
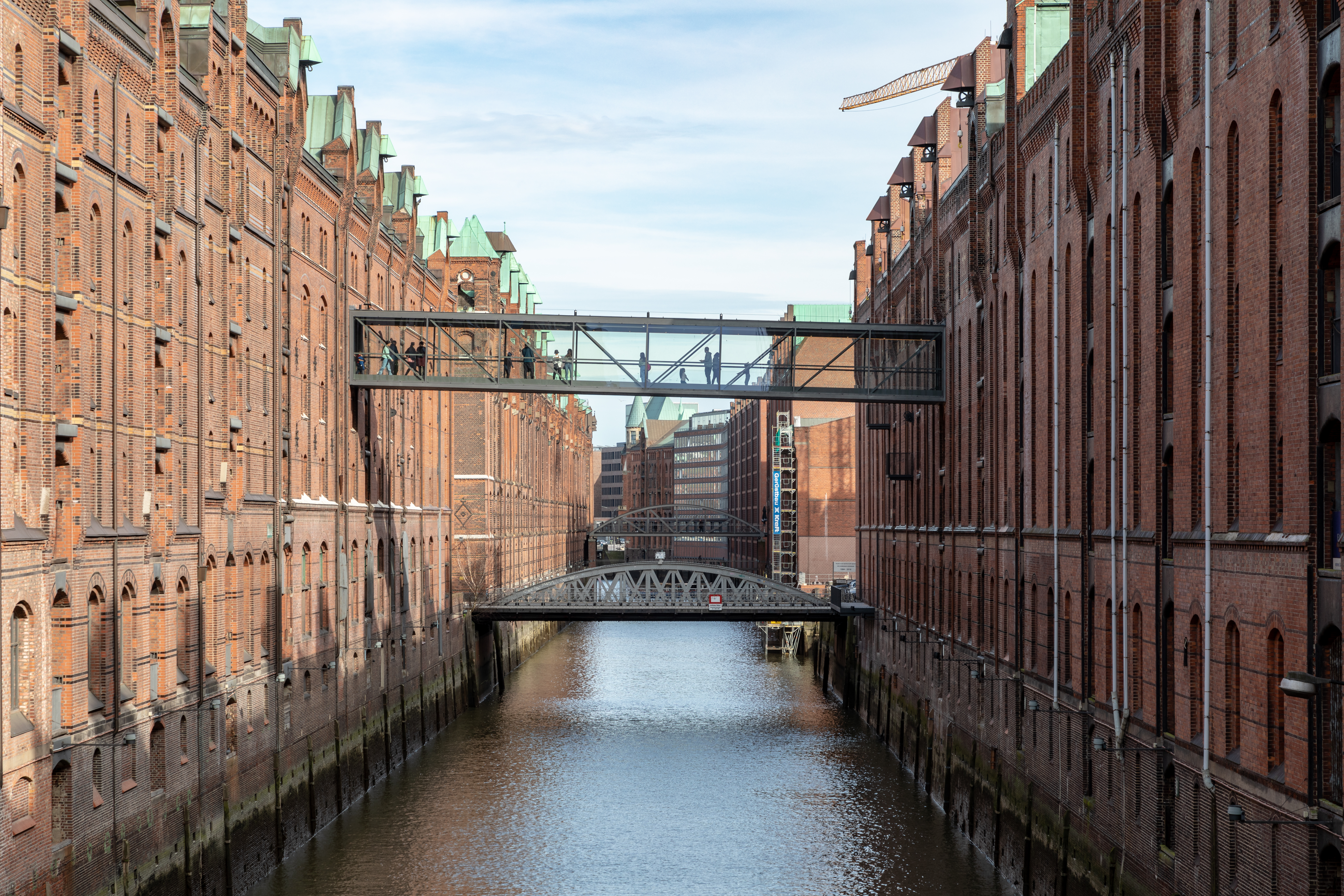
The glazed pedestrian bridge, inaugurated in 2020, connects the two warehouse buildings.

Construction began in December 2000. The first three sections (Knuffingen, Central Germany and Austria) opened on 16 August 2001. Since then, several sections have been added. With the completion of the Hamburg, German Coast section in November 2002, Wunderland became the largest model railroad in Europe. The United States was added in December 2003, followed by Scandinavia in July 2005. On 10 September 2015, the Brauns added the final piece of track between the Switzerland section and a new Italy section, extending the track length from 13,000 meters (43,000 ft) to 15,400 meters (50,500 ft). An observing Guinness judge presented the certificate for the newly established world record.

The 190 m^{2} (2,000 sq ft) Bella Italia section was opened on 28 September 2016 after four years under construction, involving 180,000 man hours and costing around €4 million. Work on the Monaco / Provence section started in August 2019 and, when completed, added another 315 meters (1,033 ft). As of 2019, the total length of 15,715 meters (51,558 ft) therefore corresponded to 1,367.21 kilometres (849.54 mi) in real length, making Miniatur Wunderland the largest model railway layout in the world by all measures.

In 2020, a bridge connected the original Wunderland to a building across the canal opened. The new space features depictions of Antarctica and South America, including Rio de Janeiro. Construction on Monaco and Provence, featuring a Formula One circuit, concluded in 2024.

Other future projects include Central America/Caribbean and Asia. The creators say construction on Great Britain will begin in 2028.

=== Sections ===
Number	Section	Picture	Construction time	Opening	Size	Source
1	Central Germany / Harz	Central Germany / Harz (2025)	Dec. 2000 - Aug. 2001	16 August 2001	ca. 120 m^{2}	
2	Knuffingen (Fictional town)	Knuffingen (2025)	Dec. 2000 - Aug. 2001	16 August 2001	ca. 120 m^{2}	
3	Austria	Austria (2025)	Dec. 2000 - Aug. 2001	16 August 2001	ca. 60 m^{2}	
4	Hamburg	Hamburg (2025)	Nov. 2001 - Nov. 2002	22 November 2002	ca. 200 m^{2}	
5	America	America (2025)	Jan. 2003 - Dec. 2003	8 December 2003	ca. 100 m^{2}	
6	Scandinavia	Scandinavia (2025)	July 2004 - July 2005	13 July 2005	ca. 300 m^{2}	
7	Switzerland	Switzerland (2025)	Oct. 2005 - Nov. 2007	12 November 2007	ca. 250 m^{2}	
8	Knuffingen Airport	Knuffingen Airport (2025)	June 2005 - May 2011	4 May 2011	ca. 150 m^{2}	
4 a	Hamburg – subsection Hafencity and Elbphilharmonie	Hafencity (2025)	Aug. 2012 - Nov. 2013	13 November 2013	ca. 9 m^{2}	
9	Italy	Italy (2025)	Feb. 2013 - Sep. 2016	28 September 2016	ca. 190 m^{2}	
9 a	Italy – Subsection Venice	Venice (2025)	Dec. 2016 - Feb. 2018	21 February 2018	ca. 9 m^{2}	
1 a	Central Germany / Harz – Subsection Kirmes	Kirmes (2025)	April 2019 - June 2020	30 June 2020	ca. 9 m^{2}	
11 b	The World From Above (Bridge between the two storage buildings)	The World From Above (2025)	March 2021 - Dec. 2021	2 December 2021	14 m^{2}	
11 a	Rio de Janeiro	Rio de Janeiro (2025)	Nov. 2017 - Dec. 2021	2 December 2021	46 m^{2}	
12	Patagonia	Patagonia (2025)	June 2019 - May 2023	3 May 2023	65 m^{2}	
10 a	Monaco	Monaco (2025)	May 2018 - April 2024	25 April 2024	40 m^{2}	
10 b	Provence	Provence (2025)	May 2018 - April 2024	25 April 2024	30 m^{2}	
13	Rainforest & Andes & Atacama Desert		2022 - Nov. 2026	9 Nov. 2026	175 m^{2}	
14	Central America & The Caribbean		(Under construction - End of 2028 (planned)		ca. 67 m^{2}	
15	Asia		End of 2029 (planned)		ca. 150 m^{2}	
16	Great Britain		2030 (planned)			

=== System ===
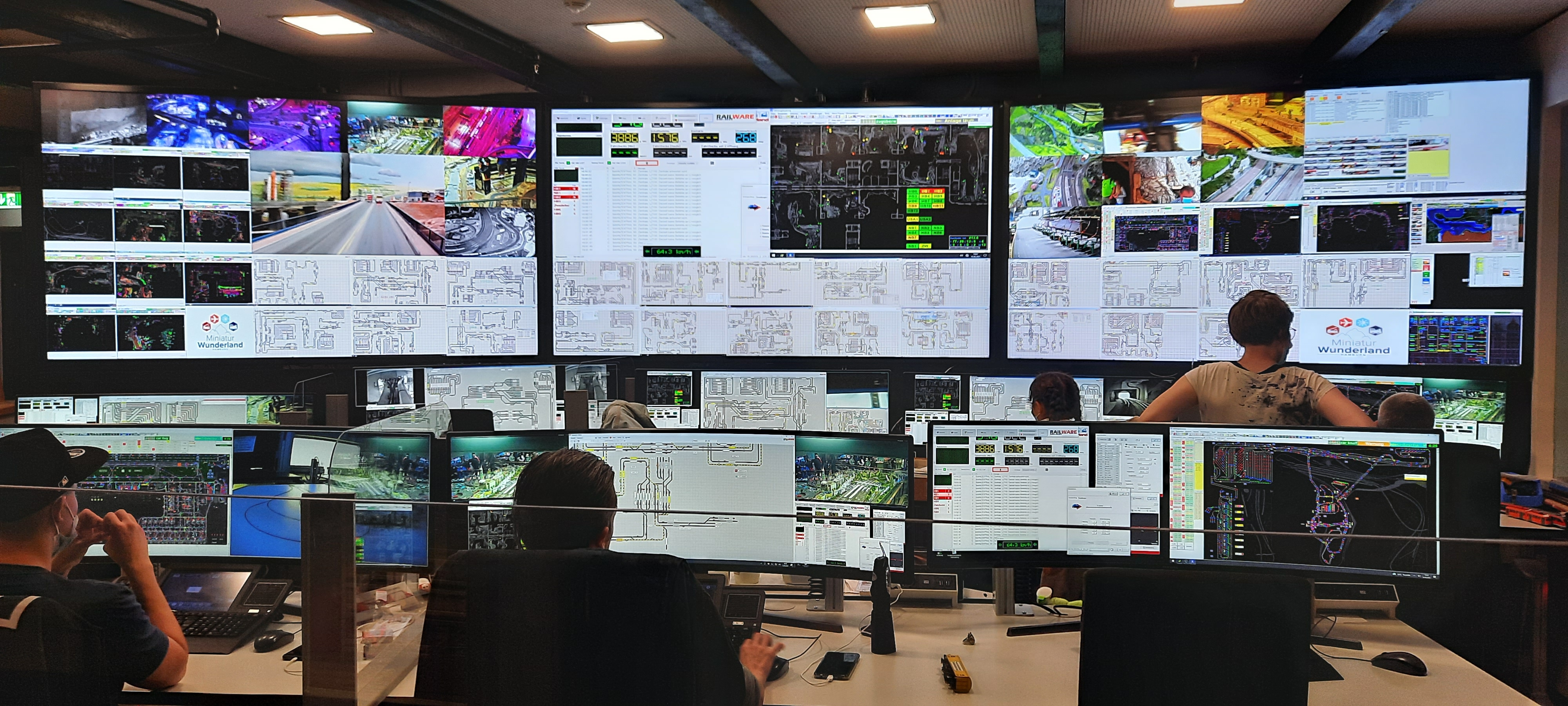
The control room

Visitors explore different rooms throughout a long corridor. Trains run along the walls of the rooms and on peninsula-like protrusions. The layout consists (as of September 2016) of nine completed sections of 60 to 300 m^{2} (650 to 3,230 sq ft).

- The first three sections were created simultaneously, showing central and southern Germany with the Harz mountains and featuring a long ICE-high speed train track.
- The fictional town of Knuffingen features a road system with moving cars.
- The Austria section involved the implementation of the Alps theme, including a multi-level helix from which trains from the other sections change corridor sides above the heads of visitors.
- The next stage of expansion includes the section with the theme Hamburg, German Coast.
- The United States section includes Las Vegas, Miami, some Wild West, another system with moving cars and a spaceport.
- The Scandinavia section has a real water area: in the future, computer-controlled ships will operate in the 30,000 liters (6,600 imp gal; 7,900 U.S. gal) "North Sea" sea tub. At present, they are still controlled manually. Tides are also simulated here.
- The Swiss Alps, extending over two floors, are modeled on the landscapes of the cantons of Ticino, Grisons and Wallis and were completed in November 2007. Through a hole in the ceiling on a total area of 100 m^{2} (1,100 sq ft) the mountains reach almost six meters (twenty feet) in height. Visitors reach this new level via stairs, while trains negotiate the height differences in concealed switchbacks and in a locomotive lift.
- The Knuffingen Airport section was opened in May 2011 after around six years in construction and development and an investment of 3.5 million euros. On display is a 150 m^{2} (1,600 sq ft) airport with a globally unique airport control system.
- A small section forms the Hamburg HafenCity with the Elbphilharmonie concert hall. Planning began in May 2012 and construction began in August the same year. A total of nine square metres (ninety-seven square feet) were available, and 10 selected houses were built on this area. The opening was on 13 November 2013.
- In 2014, a trip was made to Italy to gain lots of impressions of the country. These were brought into the 9th construction section Italy. In this section, some sights of Rome as well as landscapes like Tuscany or the lava-spewing Vesuvius can be seen. The construction section was presented in a specially created blog and opened in September 2016.
- In February 2018, the Venice section was opened at only 9 m^{2} (97 sq ft) in size. Involving around 35,000 man hours, it is the most elaborate section in relation to its size.

=== Special features ===
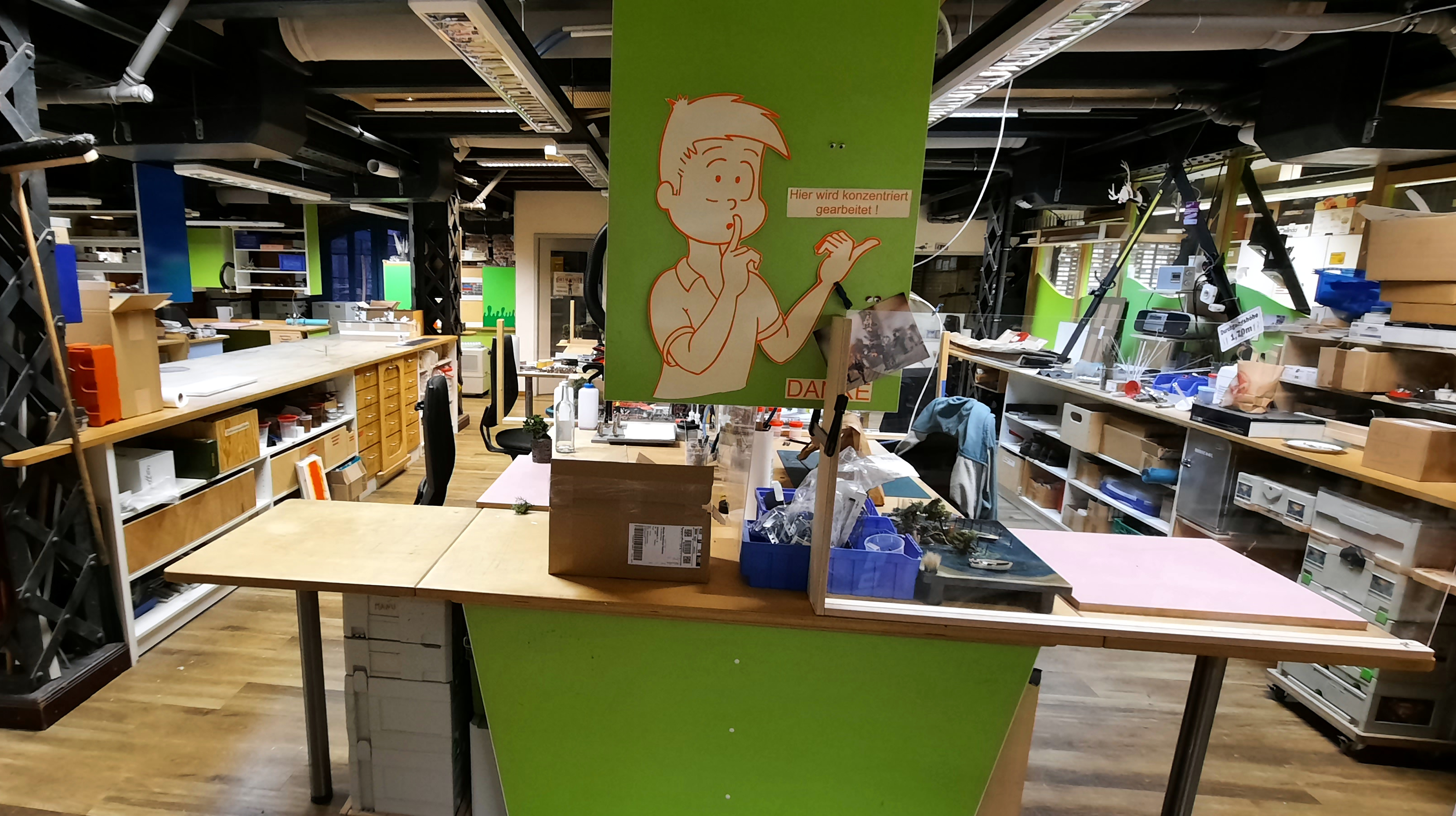
Part of the factory

Special features include a simulated daily routine where twilight, night and day repeat every 15 minutes. This includes an automatic lighting control system that activates more than 300,000 lights to match the time of day.

The 120-square-metre (1,300 sq ft) fantasy town of Knuffingen, with a population of about 6,000, is equipped with more than 100 moving model cars, including numerous fire engines, which are used to simulate a firefighting operation in Knuffingen every 15 minutes on average. Traffic simulation is made possible by a modified car system that is also used in the USA, Scandinavia and Knuffingen Airport sections. In the America section, an Interstate Highway is equipped with a dynamic Traffic Control System, which uses variable-message signs with 2x16 characters, lane use control lights, and 4 different speed limits to control traffic.

Intricate details include a changing scoreboard in the Volkspark Stadium, speeding cameras and a crashed cheese wheel truck. There is also a Jet gas station displaying the real current gasoline prices of its prototype in Hamburg's Amsinck street.

Visitors can control operations on the system through about 200 push-buttons, including options to start a mine train, turn wind turbines, trigger a goal in the football stadium, launch a helicopter or the Space Shuttle, or elongate Pinocchio's nose. One button allows visitors to watch the simulated production of a small chocolate bar in a factory, resulting in a block of Lindt chocolate dispensed for the visitor to sample.

Certain tours also include a behind-the-scenes look at detailed figures that cannot be seen from the normal public area.

=== Knuffingen Airport ===
After six years in planning and under construction, Knuffingen airport was officially opened to visitors on 4 May 2011 as a special section of the facility. Its buildings resemble Hamburg Airport. As in the fictional main town of Knuffingen, there is also a simulation of a fire department with a large fleet of vehicles, including four airfield fire engines. On the 14-meter (46 ft) runway, aircraft models accelerate to scale on an invisible sled, and by means of two guide rods can lift off the ground and disappear into a wall. Depending on the launch phase, the guide rods allow a horizontal tilt of the aircraft that approximates reality.

The section features a wide variety of standard commercial aircraft, including Boeing 747, Boeing 787, Airbus A350 and Airbus A380, in the liveries of active and defunct airlines from around the world. There is also a Airbus A321-200 in Lufthansa retro livery, Concorde in British Airways livery, a Space Shuttle, a bee (named "Bummel") and a model of the Millennium Falcon spaceship from Star Wars.

The movement of the aircraft on the ground is realized with the help of technology based on the car system. The vehicles in the airport tell their own little stories with coordinated refueling, loading and unloading before and after landing starting from the aircraft parking positions.

A real-time live timetable is displayed on screens and online, synchronizing the miniature airport's aircraft movements with scheduled arrivals and departures.

Unlike the other landscapes, the railroad at the airport is hardly visible. There is only an airport station underground.

According to the operators, the 150-square-metre (1,600 sq ft) space cost around 3.5 million euros, in addition to 150,000 man hours. The area is equipped not only with many rolling aircraft models, but also with hundreds of cars, passenger boarding bridges, parking garages, airport hotels, a subway and individual figures.

== Visitors ==
On 5 December 2012, the ten-millionth visitor came to Miniatur Wunderland, on 2 December 2016, the fifteen-millionth. and on 23 August 2021, the twenty-millionth visitor. In 2024 alone, 1,594,000 visitors came. Around three quarters of visitors come from Germany, while the remaining quarter hail mainly from Denmark, Switzerland, Austria, England, the US and China.

== Awards ==
In 2010, founders Frederik and Gerrit Braun and Stephan Hertz were awarded the Cross of Merit on Ribbon of the Order of Merit of the Federal Republic of Germany for their social commitment. The Miniatur Wunderland also holds the Guinness World Record for "longest melody played by a model train," which occurred on March 21, 2021.

== Presence in the media ==
Several times following completion of the various expansion stages, the Hamburg section was visited by a team of reporters from Eisenbahn-Romantik from SWR. Numerous television stations, magazines and newspapers have reported on Miniatur Wunderland.

In May 2009, rapper Samy Deluxe filmed a portion of the music video for the song "Stumm" in Miniatur Wunderland. About 100 sequences were recorded in which a miniature figure "runs" (stop-motion) through the layout.

On 5 December 2009, the outdoor betting section of the German television show Wetten, dass..? took place at Miniatur Wunderland.

The plot of several episodes of the Hamburg crime series Großstadtrevier takes place at Miniatur Wunderland.

In 2015, together with singer Helene Fischer, a campaign for Ein Herz für Kinder was launched in which over 450,000 euros (as of 01/2016) were collected. The campaign was presented, among others, in the Ein Herz für Kinder Gala.

In January 2016, Miniatur Wunderland partnered with Google MiniView – a miniature version of Google Street View.
