= ZZ scale =

- Scale ratio: 1:300
- Model gauge: 4.8 mm (0.189 in)
- Prototype gauge: 1,435 mm (4 ft 8 1/2 in) standard gauge

ZZ scale (1:300) is a model railroad scale with a standard gauge of 4.8 mm (0.189 in). Models for the scale were produced exclusively by Bandai between 2005 and 2007. They depict Japanese prototypes such as Shinkansen trains. To date, no other traditional scale railway support exists for the scale. However the field of miniature war games has a large selection of buildings, trucks and other accessories at 1:285 scale and 1:300. Several suppliers make these in painted and unpainted form, and at several levels of quality.

Until the 2006 announcement of T scale, ZZ scale was the smallest commercially available scale for model railroads.

== Bandai ZZ Train Lineup ==
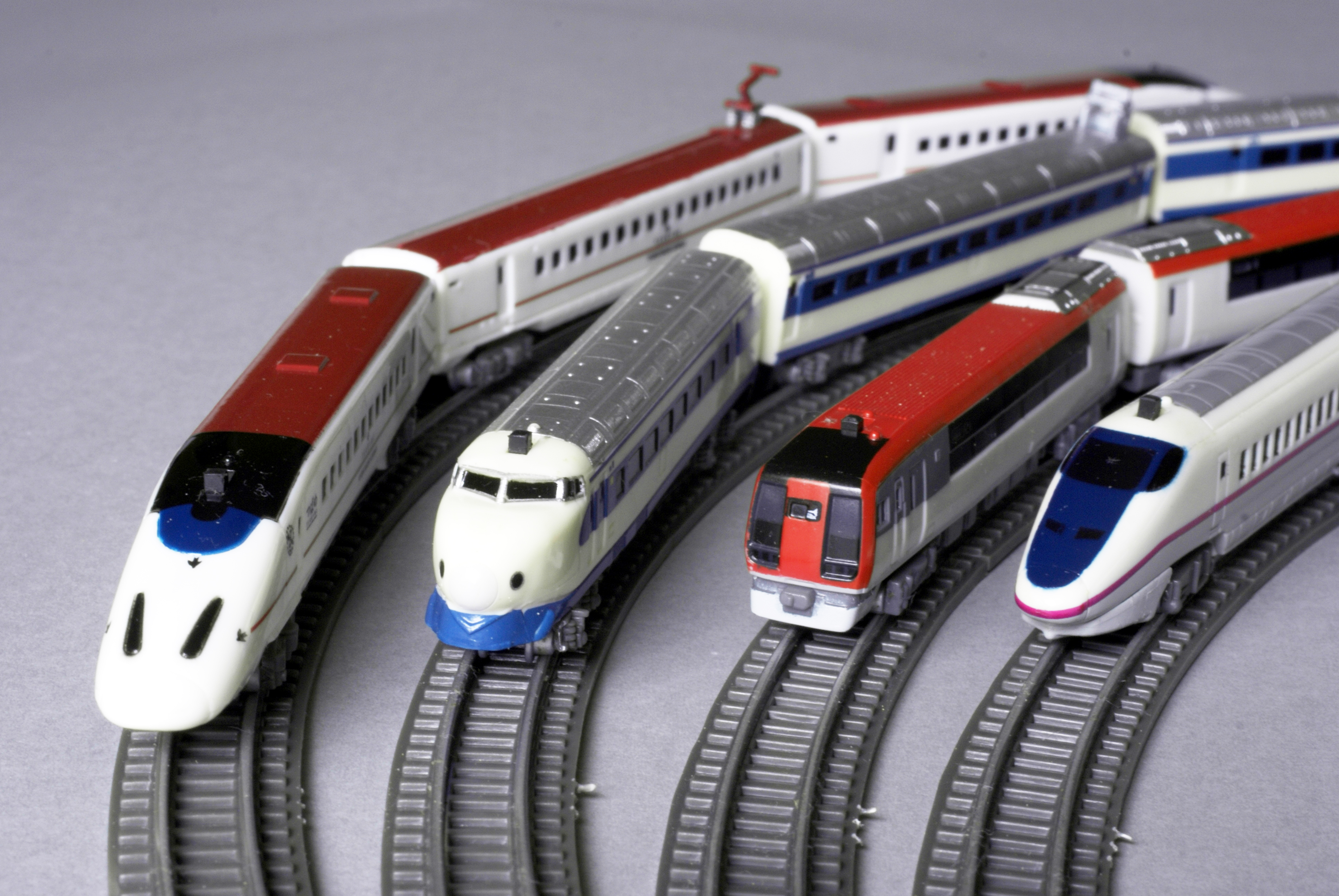
E3 Series Shinkansen, 0 Series Shinkansen, 253 Series, 800 Series Shinkansen.

The following is the complete list of model trains released by Bandai for the 1:300 ZZ scale line, categorized by their release wave.

=== Wave 1: Shinkansen Series ===
Active manufacturing of the first wave commenced in late September 2005, serving as Bandai's commercial launch of the 4.8mm gauge line.

- 0 Series Shinkansen ("Hikari")
- E3 Series Shinkansen ("Komachi")
- 800 Series Shinkansen ("Tsubame")
- E3 Series 1000/2000 Shinkansen ("Tsubasa") - Blind-box exclusive
- Class 911 Diesel Locomotive - Blind-box exclusive

=== Wave 2: Express & Commuter Series ===
The second and final wave transitioned away from bullet trains to standard regional and commuter lines, launching in mid-April 2006.

- E231 Series (Yamanote Line)
- 253 Series (Narita Express)
- 485 Series (JNR Limited Express)
- E231 Series (Chuo-Sobu Line) - Blind-box exclusive
- 485 Series ("Shirasagi" livery) - Blind-box exclusive

== Gallery ==
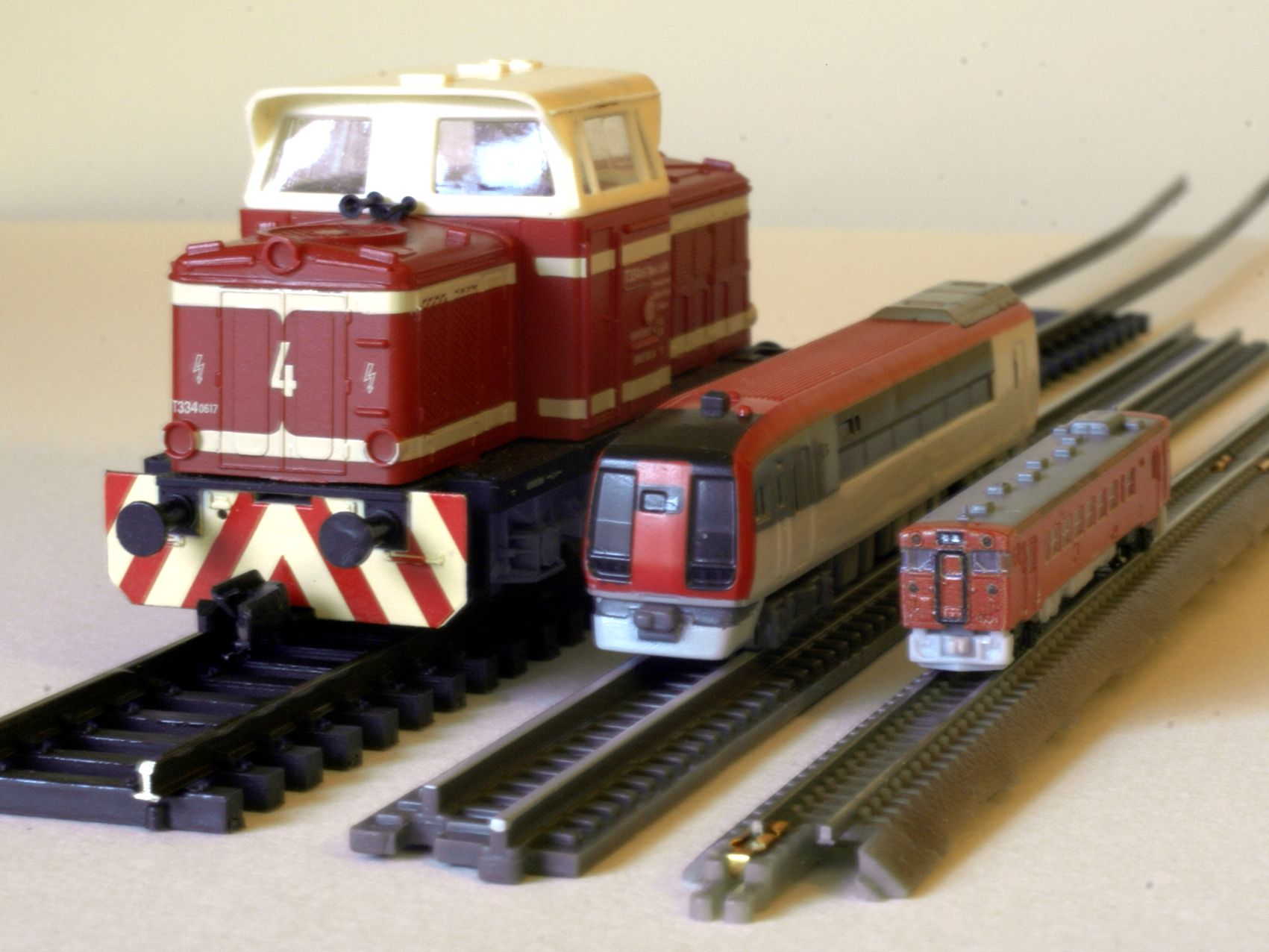
Scale comparison (left to right): TT, ZZ, T.

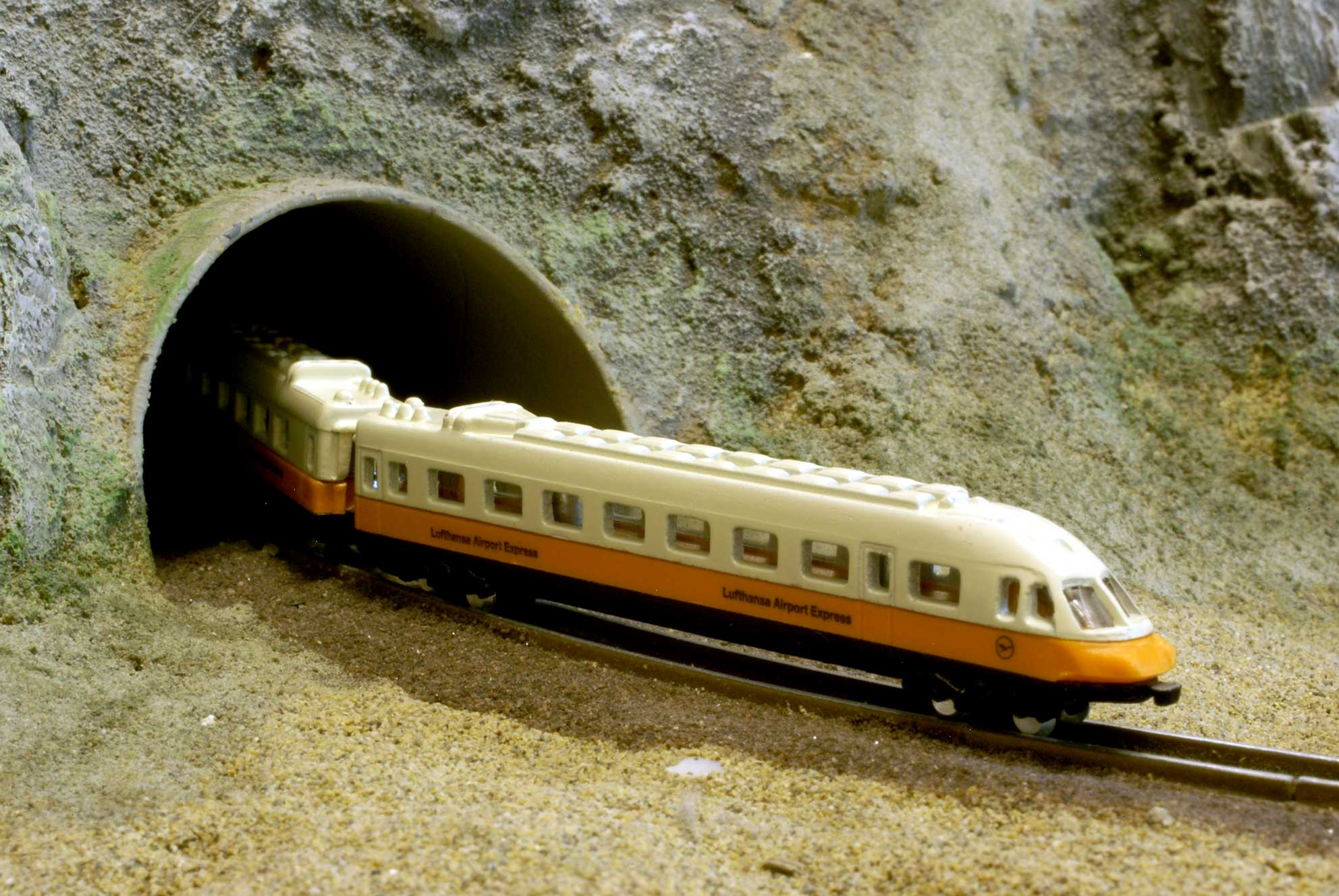
DB Class 403 static model by Schabak on ZZ track.

== See also ==
- Z scale
- Rail transport modelling scales
- Model railway scales
