= G scale =

Model railroad gauge

G gauge
- Scale ratio: varies according to prototype gauge 1:20 to 1:32
- Standard(s): LGB; NEM 010; NMRA S-1.3; NMRA S-3.3
- Model gauge: 45 mm (1.772 in)
- Prototype gauge: various: 3 feet, meter, standard

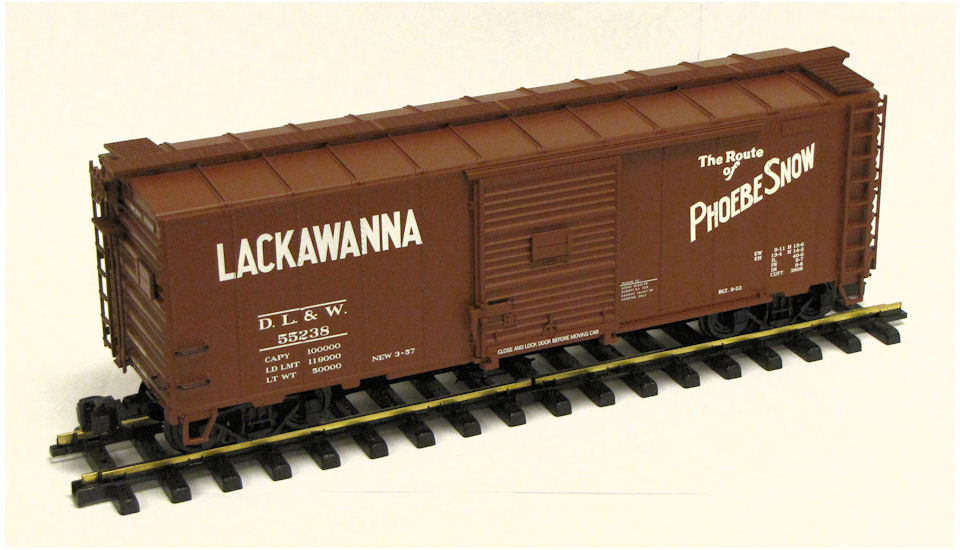
1:29 G scale boxcar by Aristo-Craft on G gauge track

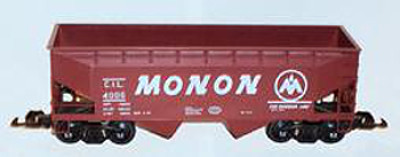
1:32 scale 2-bay offset hopper by Mainline America

In railway modelling, G scale or G gauge, also called large scale (45 mm (1.772 inches)), is a track gauge which is often used for outdoor garden railways because of its size and durability. G scale trains use a fixed track gauge of 45 mm (1.772 inches) to accommodate a range of rail transport modelling scales between narrow gauge (~1:13‒1:19‒1:20), metre gauge (1:22.5), Playmobil trains (~1:24), and standard gauge (~1:29–1:32).

G-scale LGB (Lehmann Groß Bahn, "Lehmann's Big Train") was introduced in 1968 by Ernst Paul Lehmann Patentwerk in Germany. LGB products were intended for indoor and outdoor use, so the "G" became interpreted as "garden scale".

Most track is made of brass which can remain outside in all weather. Track can also be obtained in less expensive aluminium as well as oxidation-resistant, though more expensive, stainless steel.

Like other scales, large scale is sometimes used for model trains that run indoors on a track mounted against the wall near the ceiling.

== G scale versus G gauge ==
G gauge track has a spacing of 45 mm between the rails, adopted from the pre-existing Gauge 1, but that does not determine the scale to which the models are built because, to maintain a constant track width when real-life counterparts have a variety of railroad gauges, the scale has to vary. The most common full-scale practice uses a spacing of 4 ft 8 1/2 in (1,435 mm) standard gauge, whereas some narrow-gauge railways (serving mines, etc.) have rails 3 ft (914 mm) apart or less. Although often built with standard-sized doors, a narrow-gauge train is in most other respects smaller than its standard-gauge counterpart: its cars are generally narrower and shorter, allowing them to navigate more sharply curved and lightly built tracks.

Model trains are built to represent a real train of standard or narrow gauge. For example, HO scale (1:87 or 3.5 mm to 1 foot) (and also, although inaccurately, double-O/OO at 4 mm to 1 foot) models all use 16.5 mm gauge track to represent standard gauge trains while a narrower-gauge track such as 9 mm N gauge is used to represent real narrow gauge.

G model railways depart from this and always use the same gauge with the trains instead built in different sizes depending on whether they are intended to represent standard-gauge or narrow-gauge trains. Because of this it might be more correct to speak of "G gauge" rather than "G scale" since the consistent aspect is the gauge, 45 mm (1.772 in), but the term "G scale" (or "scale IIm") is used when 1:22.5 is used.

The 45 mm gauge originated from 1 gauge or "gauge one" which was first used in Europe and Britain and used to model standard gauge trains in the scale of 1:32.

LGB were first to adopt the term G scale and used the gauge of 45 mm (1.772 in) to model 1,000 mm gauge European trains in 1:22.5 scale.

=== Scales that run on G gauge track ===
- 1 gauge: 1:32 (3/8 inch to the foot). Used to model standard gauge trains of 4 ft 8 1/2 in (1,435 mm) standard gauge gauge.
- 1:29 scale or A scale: 1:29. First used by Aristo-Craft to model standard-gauge prototypes. Incorrect scale/gauge but proportionally similar to other popular brands of the time.
- G scale: 1:22.5. Used to model European trains that run on 1,000 mm (3 ft 3 3/8 in) metre gauge track. This scale-gauge combination is called "scale IIm" according to NEM 010. The G comes from the German word groß meaning "big".
- H scale (half inch) 1/2-inch-to-the-foot, or 1:24 scale. Used to model 3 ft 6 in (1,067 mm) gauge or "Cape gauge". Incorrect scale used for 3 ft (914 mm) gauge track.
- F scale (fifteen) 15 mm-to-the-foot scale, (1:20.32). Correct scale/gauge typically used to model North American narrow gauge trains on 3 ft (914 mm) gauge track.
- Seven eighths: 7/8-inch-to-the-foot scale (1:13.7). Used to model trains on 2 ft (610 mm) narrow gauge track.
- 16 mm scale: 16 mm-to-the-foot (1:19.05). Originally intended for modelling 2-ft gauge prototype railways on 32 mm track (SM32). The models are often re-gauged to also run on 45 mm track. This scale has also been used to model 2 ft 6 in (762 mm) gauge prototype trains.

== Manufacturers ==
- Accucraft has five scales: Fn3 at 1:20.3, gauge 1 at 1:32, 1/2-inch scale at 1:24. They also build 1:29-scale North American models in live steam and electric under the AML brand, as well as British live steam and electric models in 1:19 scale (also called 16 mm) and Isle of Man live steam and electric models in 1:20.3 scale. The Isle of Man scale uses three-foot gauge track, the same width as the dominant U.S. Colorado narrow gauge.
- American Model Builders: 1:24
- Aristo-Craft (REA), which closed in 2013, made two scales: 1:29 and the "Classic" series (generally 1:24 but some models were closer to 1:32 scale).
- Aster (C&S Mogul): 1:32, 1:30 for Japanese prototypes and 1:22.5 for European and Japanese narrow gauge.
- Bachmann: "Big Haulers" series (1:22.5), "Spectrum" series (1:20.3), streetcars (1:29)
- Buddy "L" (Keystone) (modern): 1:22.5 scale (almost identical to Bachmann, except cab is taller); older equipment runs on rails spaced 3 1/4 inches, a gauge established before World War II.
- Chicago Train Works: 1:32
- Chucks Custom Cars: 1:22.5
- D.A.N.: 1:22.5
- Delton/Caledonia Express: 1:24 (operated from 1983 to 1990 as Delton; until 1993 as Caledonia)
- Eastern Railways: 1:32
- GHB: 1:32
- Great Trains/American Standard: 1:32
- Hartford Products: 1:24 (except SP boxcar and stock car, which are 1:22.5)
- Hartland Locomotive Works products: 1:29 standard-gauge equipment, 1:24 scale narrow-gauge equipment.
- Kalamazoo Toy Train Works: 1:24 (operated from 1980 to the mid-1990s)
- Keystone: 1:22.5
- LGB (sold to Märklin in 2007): 1:22.5
- Lionel: Ready to Play (1:24), Ready to Run (1:24 but on 2-inch-wide [51 mm] track)
- Little Railways: 1:20
- Mainline America: 1:32
- Märklin "Maxi": 1:32
- Model Die Casting: 1:32, except caboose, which is 1:24
- MTH Rail-King: 1:32
- Northern Fine Scale Stock: 10 mm scale. (British-only freight stock in kit form)
- Precision scale: 1:32 standard-gauge, 1:24 narrow gauge
- PIKO: 1:29 (American cars); 1:22.5 (wood-sided passenger cars)
- Roberts Lines (Zephyr): 1:32
- USA Trains: 1:29 ("Ultimate" series); 1:24 ("American" series)
- Wrightway Rolling Stock: 1:32 and 10 mm scale custom-built British North American and European passenger stock.

== See also ==
- Gn15 - 1:22.5-scale models of 15 in (381 mm) gauge trains on 16.5 mm (0.65 in) gauge track
- Rail transport modelling (Model railway) scales
- SE scale, ~1:13-scale models
