= Z scale =

Small model railroad gauge and scale

- Scale: 1.385 mm to 1 ft (305 mm)
- Scale ratio: 1:220
- Model gauge: 6.5 mm / 0.256 in
- Prototype gauge: 1,435 mm (4 ft 8 1/2 in) standard gauge

Z scale is one of the smallest commercially available model railway scales (1:220), with a track gauge of 6.5 mm / 0.256 in. Introduced by Märklin in 1972, Z scale trains operate on 0–10 volts DC and offer the same operating characteristics as all other two-rail, direct-current, analog model railways. Locomotives can be fitted with digital decoders for independent control. Model trains, track, structures, and human/animal figures are readily available in European, North American, and Japanese styles from a variety of manufacturers.

== History ==
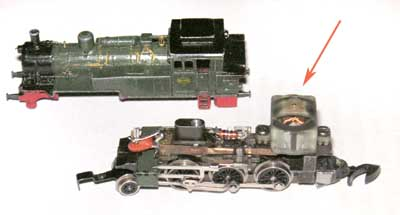
The sugar-cube sized electric motor in a Z scale model locomotive. The entire engine is only 50 mm (1.97 in) long.

Z scale was introduced by the German model train manufacturer Märklin in 1972 at the Nuremberg Toy Fair. It was the brainchild of Helmut Killian, Märklin's head design engineer at the time. The letter Z was chosen to designate the new scale, its place as the last character of the German and English alphabets signaling the thought that there would never be a smaller commercial model railway scale. While there have been attempts since then to bring even smaller scales to the market, they remain niche products without a wider following – the largest market being T gauge (1:450, 3 mm (0.118 in) gauge), designed in Japan and manufactured in China.

Originally running on 8 V DC, track voltage was increased to 10 V DC around the year 2000. Accessory power has always been 10 V AC.

In 1978, a Märklin Z scale locomotive pulling six coaches made its entry into the Guinness Book of World Records by running nonstop for 1,219 hours, and travelling a distance of 720 km (450 mi) before the motor failed and the train stopped.

Z scale, at its inception, was predominantly a European scale, but it has an increasing number of followers in other parts of the world. There are now also manufacturers in North America and Japan and China, among others. Z scale enthusiasts throughout Europe, North America, and Japan participate regularly at most national and regional model railroad exhibitions and shows, where they have demonstrated the outstanding operation and layout design characteristics of the scale. While prices were initially higher for Z scale products (particularly locomotives) compared with those available in larger scales, as volume production, computer-aided design and manufacturing techniques, and the number of competing manufacturers increased, prices have come down to a point comparable to those of high-quality models in other scales.

As early as 1988, Märklin announced their intention to offer digital train control systems in Z scale, and Märklin's 1988 Z scale product catalog listed three locomotives with a built-in digital decoder. However, the technology was not developed enough, and the manufacturer had to cancel these plans, mainly due to heat dissipation problems in locomotive decoders. Since then, these problems have been solved, Z scale has embraced advanced electronics (e.g., microprocessors originally developed for cell phones, surface-mount technology, etc.), and an increasing number of modellers have converted their locomotives to use third party digital model train control systems.

The first attempts to use digital system in Z scale were based on NEM standard, Selectrix, which offered the smallest decoders in the market, with thicknesses of less than 2 mm. German company Müt brought also the first digital control central unit designed specially for Z scale in the market in the early 2000s. Use of the popular National Model Railroad Association (NMRA) Digital Command Control (DCC) standard has expanded substantially in Z scale recently as locomotive decoders with sizes comparable to the sizes of smallest Selectrix decoders have become available.

Z scale is now a mature modelling scale, with model locomotives, rolling stock, buildings, signalling and human and animal figures becoming available in increasing numbers from an expanding variety of established and particularly smaller, fast-growing manufacturers. Z scale layouts have been winning local, regional, and national level competitions, such as best of show at the NMRA National Train Show (NTS) in July 2001, in St. Louis, MO.

== Advantages ==
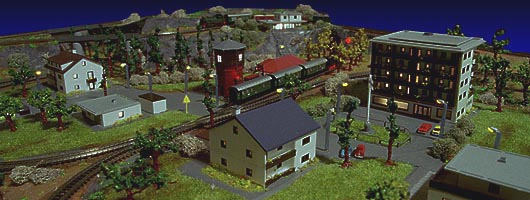
A "night shot" of a coffee-table sized Z scale layout

The diminutive size of Z scale makes it possible to fit more scale space into the same physical layout as would be used by larger-scale models. Z scale can also be beneficial when there is a need to build very compact train layouts, such as novelty setups in briefcases, guitar cases, or jewelry boxes. Several transportation museums, for instance, have used Z scale to present real world railway scenes. Z scale allows longer trains and broader, more realistic curves than is practical in larger scales.

== Drawbacks ==
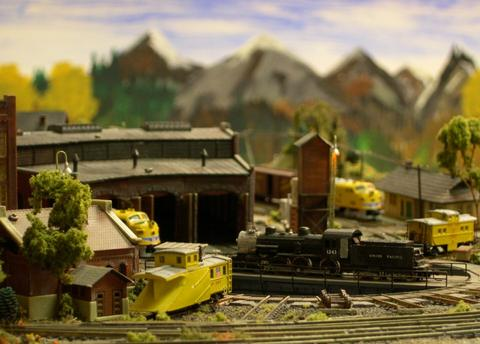
"Val Ease East" division yard scene showing scratch-built Russell snow plow and detailed Mogul on the turntable.

Due to the small size of Z scale and, in particular, the low weight of the locomotives (a small Z scale engine can weigh as little as 20 g (0.71 oz)), it can be challenging to ensure reliable operation. In particular, the track must be kept clean, as minuscule particles of dust, dirt, or corrosion can easily stop locomotives. Poorly-installed trackwork can be a source of consistent derailing of rolling stock (although this is true, to some extent, in any scale). All of this can create issues for modelers who are interested in prototypical operations – in particular, switching.

The low weight of Z scale locomotives contributes to their difficulty pulling trains up grades. In practice, the grade is kept under 2% for reliable operation of trains up to seven, four-axle cars; shorter trains can operate on grades up to 4%. Pulling power of locomotives can be increased by use of traction tires, or by adding weight using high-density material – tungsten powder (used in metal golf club driver heads) and lead are popular choices.

The smaller market for Z scale results in a limited range of available products, including both rolling stock and accessories; some of the demand is therefore met by cottage industries.

== Manufacturers ==
- The originator of Z scale, German manufacturer Märklin, still dominates the market for European prototype trains. Märklin couplers are unrealistic but can be easily coupled and uncoupled.
- Micro-Trains Line (MTL) of Talent, Oregon, has joined Märklin as a major Z scale manufacturer and supplier of Z scale model locomotives, rolling stock, structures, and complete set track systems specializing in North American prototypes. MTL uses Magnematic couplers that can be uncoupled magnetically and enable operations that mimic prototype railroad activities such as delivering or picking up empty or loaded rail cars, building trains in classification yards, etc. Other manufacturers use fixed couplers that cannot be manipulated in this way.

There is a growing number of smaller manufacturers, both in Europe and in North America, of Z scale specialty items, such as detail parts, electronics, track-building aids, structures, scratch-building supplies, and tools in addition to rolling stock.

- In addition to custom Z scale rolling stock for European, Japanese, and North American modelers, the German company Freudenreich Feinwerktechnik (FR) has introduced a complete narrow-gauge Z scale system with 4.5 mm (0.177 in) gauge track, which corresponds with metre gauge in prototype and is designated as Zm scale following the NEM standard scale naming system.
- American Z Line (AZL) is a growing manufacturer producing a variety of highly detailed injection-molded North American prototype diesel locomotives and rolling stock as well as limited-run brass model steam and diesel locomotives. AZL has produced the largest variety of North American prototype locomotives and rolling stock available.
- Rokuhan, a Japanese company, produces Japanese prototype rolling stock as well as structures, accessories, and a complete line of track products with simulated wooden and concrete ties suitable for North American themed model railroads.
- Azar Models, French manufacturer, produces French and European prototype rolling stock.
- Atlas produces three foot (914mm) long Z scale flex track and number 6 switches with North American tie spacing (closer than European because North American rail cars are heavier).
- Peco produces two foot (610mm) long Z scale flex track with European tie spacing.

== See also ==
- Rail transport modelling scales
- H0f gauge, 1:87 models using 6.5 mm Z-gauge track
