= FREMO =

FREMO H0
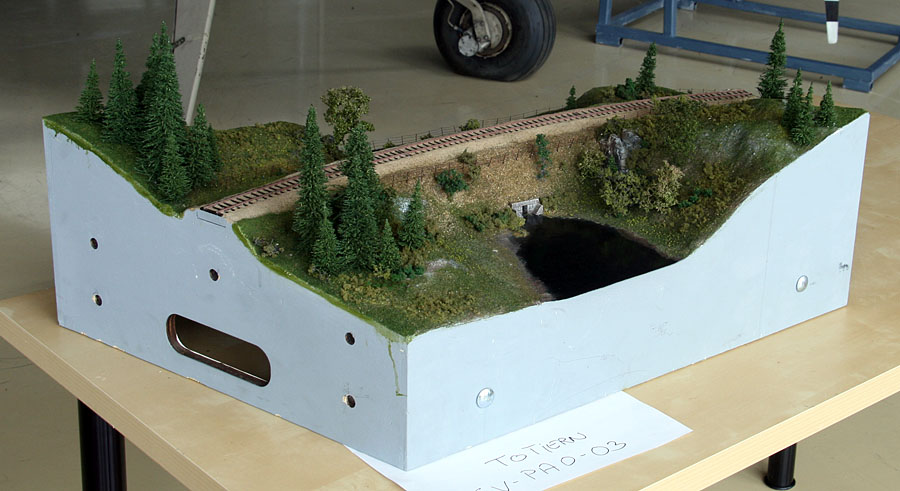
- Individual FREMO module with standardised end profiles and fixing holes
- Scale: 3.5 mm to 1 foot
- Scale ratio: 1:87
- Standard(s): H0-Europe (single track); H0-Mainline (double track); FREMO-E (overhead electric); H0-Hafen (industrial); H0fine (finescale); FREMO:87 (finescale); 00fremo (UK 1:76 scenery)
- Model gauge: 16.5 mm (0.65 in); 9 mm (0.354 in)

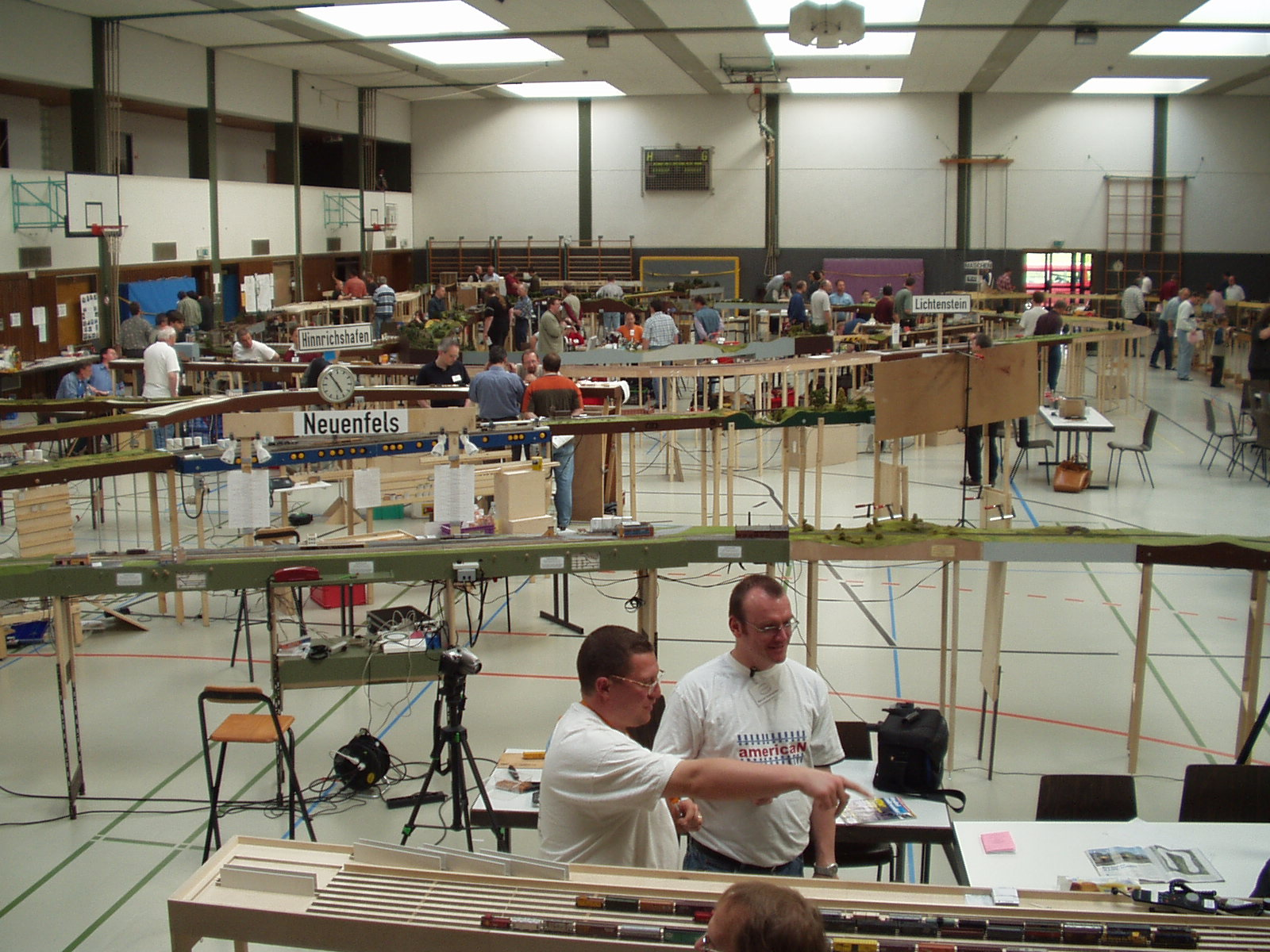
Many FREMO modules joined together to make a large layout

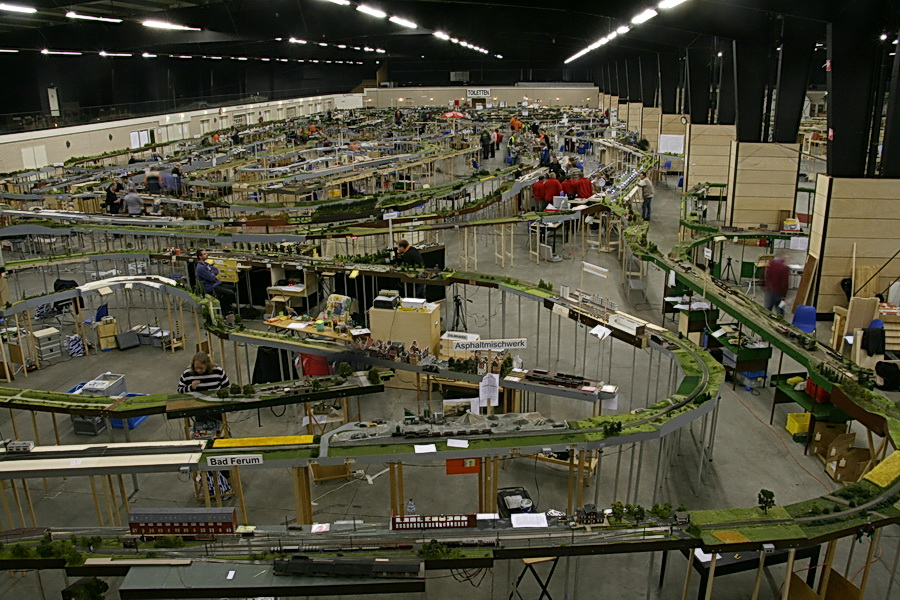
Meeting during 2010 in the Netherlands with over 1 kilometre (0.62 mi) of track

The Friendship of European railway modellers (German: Freundeskreis Europäischer Modellbahner, FREMO) is a modular rail transport modelling standard. Individual track and scenery modules are built to a common standard and are joined together to make larger model railway layouts. The FREMO standards were created following a meeting in Europe in 1981.

Single track h0 scale modules are typically 500 millimetres (20 in) wide, of variable length, viewable from both sides. Each module comes with adjustable legs, to create a uniform top-of-rail height of 1,300 millimetres (51 in) above floor level. Modules are physically joined together using three 12-millimetre-diameter (0.5 in) holes and hand-tightened M8 wingbolts with washers and wingnuts. The electrical inter-connection uses two Banana connectors per track bus, over which Digital Command Control (DCC) signalling running at 14 volts is used for train control. Track uses Code 83 rails (2.1 mm or 0.083 inches high), with a minimum curve radius of 2,000 millimetres (6 ft 7 in; representing 175 metres or 575 feet at 1:87) and fixed track centre-line spacing of 46 millimetres (1.8 in; representing 4 metres or 13 feet separation at 1:87 scale).

Some general aspects, such as rigid construction of modules, are derived from the Normen Europäischer Modellbahnen NEM 900 standards published by MOROP. In 1995, the North American Free-mo standards were based on those of FREMO, with a number of changes made.

== North American standards ==
In 1994 Chris Palomarez and Art Armstrong at the San Luis Obispo Model Railroad Club (SLOMRC) developed the Free-mo Standard based on the European FREMO concept.

== N-scale variant ==
In 2004, the traditional Free-mo standard was adapted for N scale (1:160). It uses Code 55 rail at a nominal height of 50 inches (1,300 mm). Curves should not have a radius of less than 22 inches (560 mm) on the main line and use turnouts sized No. 6 or larger.

== NMRA British Region Freemo standard ==
In 2011 the NMRA British Region released a set of standards called Freemo, Recommended Specifications For HO Scale Modules.

== Australian Model Railway Association standard ==
The Australian Model Railway Association has a set of standards based on FREMO called the "AMRA Free Form Module Standard." Version 2.4 of the standard was published in July 2024. As of 2024, there are standards for HO and N Scales, with an O Scale version under development in collaboration with the Aus7 O Scale Modeller's Group. The AMRA standard is similar to the FREMO standard, but uses a slightly lower rail height of 1,200 mm and uses M6 wing bolts.

== See also ==
- List of rail transport modelling scale standards
