= Garden railway =

Model railway system

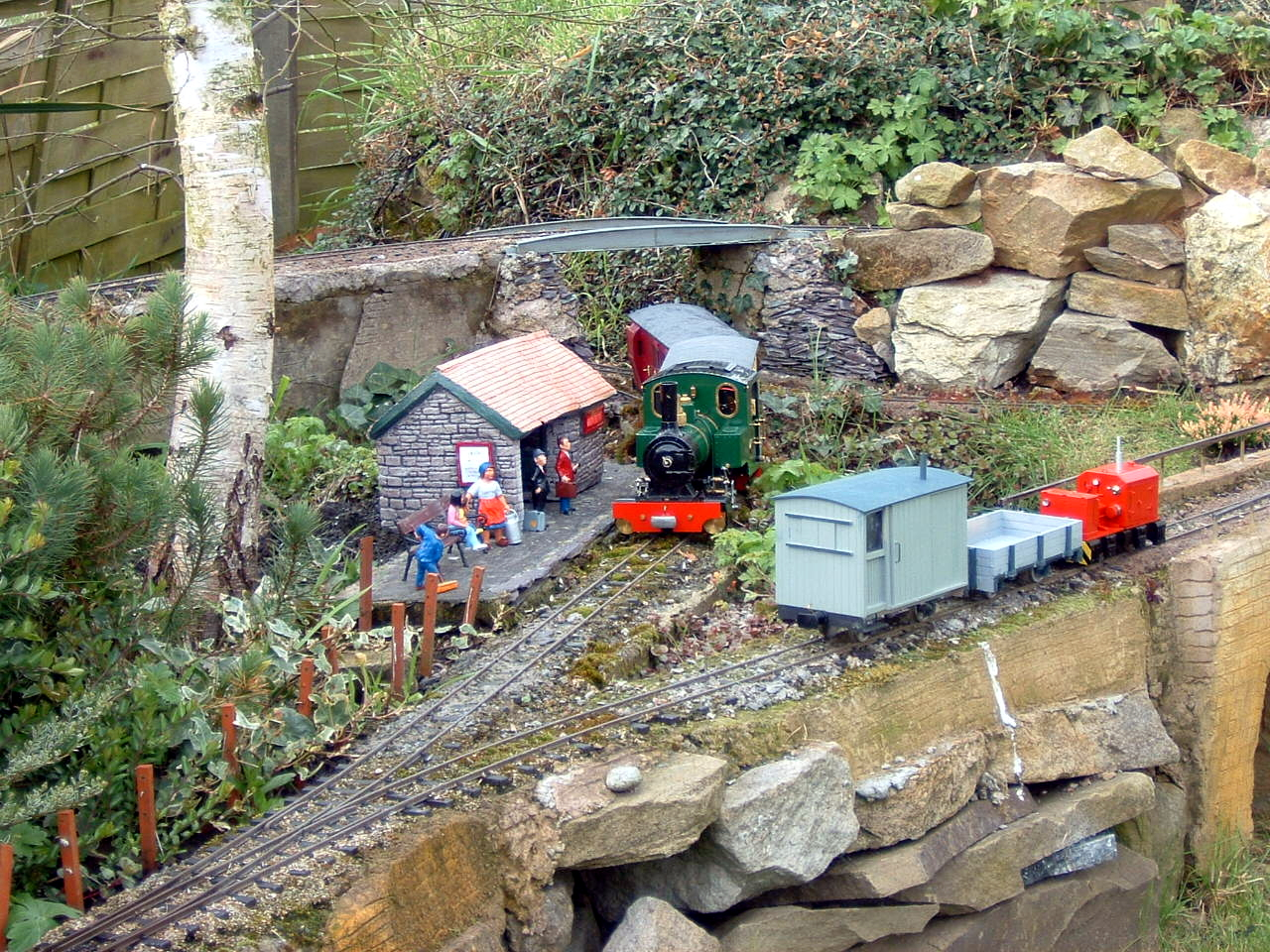
UK garden railway scene in 16 mm scale

A garden railway or garden railroad is a model railway set up outdoors in a garden. G scale is the most popular scale for garden railroads, except in the United Kingdom, where 16 mm scale is widely used.

A garden railway's scale is usually in the range of 1/32 (Gauge 1) to 1/12 (1:12), running on either 45 mm (1.772 in) or 32 mm (1.26 in) gauge track. 1/32 scale (1:32) is also called "three-eighths scale" meaning 3/8 of an inch on the model represents one foot on the real thing. For similar reasons, 1/24 scale (1:24) is also called "half-inch scale". Other popular scales are 1:29, 1:20.3 (representing 3 ft (914 mm) gauge prototypes on 45 mm (1.772 in) track; and 16 mm (1:19). Less frequently, smaller scales are use.

Model locomotives in 16 mm scale are often live steam models of British narrow gauge prototypes that run on 32 mm / 1.26 in) track, the same as O gauge.

The rolling stock of a garden railway is smaller than that of a backyard railroad or miniature railway and cannot be ridden.

== See also ==
- Rail transport modelling scales
- Backyard railroad
- Ridable miniature railways
- Children's railway
