= Rail transport modelling scales =

Scales used by rail transport models

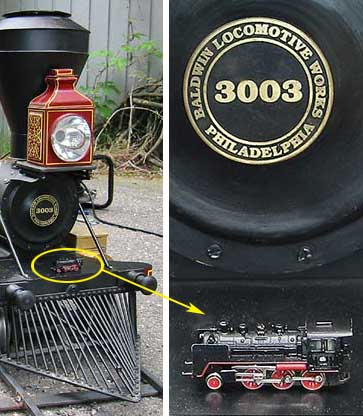
One of the smallest (Z scale, 1:220) placed on the buffer beam of one of the largest (Live steam, 1:8) model locomotives

Rail transport modelling uses a variety of scales (ratio between the real world and the model) to ensure scale models look correct when placed next to each other. Model railway scales are standardized worldwide by many organizations and hobbyist groups. Some of the scales are recognized globally, while others are less widespread and, in many cases, virtually unknown outside their circle of origin. Scales may be expressed as a numeric ratio (e.g. 1/87 or 1:87) or as letters defined in rail transport modelling standards (e.g. G, O, S, OO, HO, TT, N, and Z.) The majority of commercial model railway equipment manufacturers base their offerings on Normen Europäischer Modellbahnen (NEM) or National Model Railroad Association (NMRA) standards in most popular scales.

== Terminology ==
Scale and gauge are different: scale means the ratio between a unit of measurement on a model compared with a unit of measurement in corresponding full size prototype, whereas gauge is the distance between the two running rails of the track. About 60% of the world's railways have a track gauge of 4 ft 8 1/2 in (1,435 mm) known as "standard gauge", but there are also narrow-gauge railways where the track gauge is narrower than standard, and broad-gauge railways where the gauge is wider. Similarly, a scale model railway may have several track gauges in one scale.

In addition to the scale and gauge issue, rail transport modelling standards are also applied to other attributes such as catenary, rolling stock wheel profile, loading gauge, curve radii and grades for slopes, to ensure interoperation of scale models produced by different manufacturers. Globally, the two dominating standard organizations are NMRA in North America and MOROP in Europe with their NEM standard.

== History of scale standards ==
A 242A1 locomotive and standard gauge track at some model railway scales

The first model railways were not built to any particular scale and were more like toys than miniature representations. Eventually, models became more accurate, and benefits of standardization became more obvious. The most significant and the most basic area of standardization was the model track gauge. At first, certain gauges became de facto standards for hobbyists and manufacturers. While the first unofficial standard gauges made interchangeability possible, the models were still only a rough approximation of rolling stock.

Eventually unofficial or manufacturer-specific scale standards became more established, and model railway standardisation bodies such as the NMRA and MOROP formalised them. However, they were very often poorly implemented in design and manufacturing processes with commercial manufacturers before the World War II. The conformity to scale standards grew strongly in the 1950s and 1960s when many new model railway accessories manufacturers were born and to whom the standard conformity was vital.

=== Inaccuracy to improve reliability ===
For most standardized model railway scales, the nominal scale reduction ratio is not applied systematically to all the components of a scale model railway, and normally the standards give scale specific design guidelines for all the scales they cover. Reliability of operations requires that certain parts be made oversize. A typical example is the wheel flanges, which must be proportionally higher in smaller scales to ensure that lighter and smaller models do not derail easily as they would if universal flange proportions were used in all the scales. For instance, a Z scale wheel flange as defined in the NEM standard should be about 9% of the scale nominal standard gauge (6.5 mm / 0.256 in), whereas the same standard gives only 5% for 45 mm (1.772 in) standard-gauge I scale.

=== Finescale standards ===
Modellers who were dissatisfied with inaccuracies in the name of reliability have developed alternative finescale standards. Finescale standards are very much restricted to discerning hobbyists since, by definition, finescale model railways require finer tolerances and are therefore more expensive to manufacture, which makes them unattractive for mass-production product manufacturers.

=== Linear propulsion ===
One limitation with smaller scales is that the small size of the metal contacts means it is easier for dust and dirty track to interfere with the electrical circuit needed to drive the train. Moreover, the tight tolerances also mean friction can more easily interfere with the train moving. One approach to enable further miniaturization beyond T Scale is the recent commercial introduction of linear drive motors. The magnetic propulsion eliminates moving parts, simplifying motion and models. Commercially available scales using linear propulsion drive range from 1:655 to 1:1000.

== Scale standards ==
Most standards are regional, but some have followers in other parts of the world outside their native region, most notably NEM and NMRA. While the most significant standardised dimension of a model railway scale is the gauge, a typical scale standard covers many more aspects of model railways and defines scale-specific dimensions for items like catenary, rolling stock wheels, loading gauge, curve radii and grades for slopes, for instance.

=== NEM ===
MOROP (the European federation of national model railway associations) is a European organisation which publishes NEM-standards. The standards are used by model railway industry and hobbyists in Continental Europe. The NEM standards are published by the technical commission of MOROP in French and German and both versions have an official status. Member associations and individuals have translated these official versions into other languages, and therefore English versions are also available directly from MOROP. Due to the unofficial status, some translations are just literal (word-by-word) translations. For example, in NEM 010 the French voie H0 translates as gauge H0 in English, the same as the German Spur H0.

Model railway scales and gauges are standardized in NEM 010, which covers several gauges for each scale. Narrow gauges are indicated by an additional letter added after the base scale as follows:

- no letter = standard gauge (1,250–1,700 mm or 49.2–66.9 in)
- m = metre gauge (850–1,250 mm or 33.5–49.2 in)
- e = narrow gauge (650–850 mm or 25.6–33.5 in)
- i = industrial (400–650 mm or 15.7–25.6 in)
- p = park railway (300–400 mm or 11.8–15.7 in)

For instance, a metre-gauge model railway in H0-scale is designated H0m. In German text the letter "f" (for Feldbahn) is sometimes used instead of "i". The letter "e" represents the French word for "narrow", étroit. NEM gauges are arranged conveniently to use the normal gauge of smaller scales as narrow gauges for a certain scale. For instance, H0m gauge is the same as the TT-scale normal gauge, H0e same as the N-scale normal gauge and H0i same as the Z-scale normal gauge.

For H0 and 0 scales, NEM uses the number zero, and NMRA uses letter "O" (HO instead of H0).

Scale	Ratio	Standard gauge	m	e	i	p	Notes
Z	1:220	6.5 mm (0.256 in)	4.5 mm	–	–	–	Standard gauge based on the Märklin factory standards.
N	1:160	9 mm (0.354 in)	6.5 mm	4.5 mm	–	–	Standard gauge based on the Arnold factory standards.
TT	1:120	12 mm (0.472 in)	9 mm	6.5 mm	4.5 mm	–	–
H0	1:87	16.5 mm (0.65 in)	12 mm	9 mm	6.5 mm	4.5 mm	"Half zero"
S	1:64	22.5 mm (0.886 in)	16.5 mm	12 mm	9 mm	6.5 mm	–
0	1:45	32 mm (1.26 in)	22.5 mm	16.5 mm	12 mm	9 mm	
1	1:32	45 mm (1.772 in)	32 mm	22.5 mm	16.5 mm	12 mm	–
II	1:22.5	64 mm (2 1/2 in)	45 mm	32 mm	22.5 mm	16.5 mm	Standard gauge known as Gauge 3 in the UK (scaled at 17/32 inch to the foot) and known as Gauge 2 1/2 on the Märklin factory standards from 1891.
III	1:16	89 mm (3 1/2 in)	63.5 mm	45 mm	32 mm	22.5 mm	
V	1:11	127 mm (5 in)	89 mm	63.5 mm	45 mm	32 mm	Common gauge for Live Steam scaled at 1 1/16 inches to the foot in the UK
VII	1:8	184 mm (7 1/4 in)	127 mm	89 mm	63.5 mm	45 mm	Common gauge for Live Steam
X	1:5.5	260 mm (10 1/4 in)	184 mm	127 mm	89 mm	63.5 mm	–

=== NMRA ===
The NMRA (National Model Railroad Association) standardized the first model railway scales in the 1940s. NMRA standards are used widely in North America and by certain special interest groups all over the world. To some extent NMRA and NEM standards are compatible, but in many areas, the two standards specify certain model railway details in somewhat incompatible ways for the same scale.

There are two NMRA standard sheets where the scales have been defined. NMRA standard S-1.2 covers the popular model railway scales and S-1.3 defines scales with deep flanges for model railways with very sharp curves or other garden railway specific design features.

In certain NMRA scales an alternative designation is sometimes used corresponding the length of one prototype foot in scale either in millimetres or in inches. For instance, 3.5 mm scale is the same as HO. For HO and O -scales, NMRA uses the letter "O" whereas NEM uses the number zero (H0 instead of HO).

The NMRA published alternative, more accurate and realistic standards for track and wheels sheet in S-1.1. These model railway standards are based on the full size prototype standards and the scale model operational reliability is therefore reduced in comparison to the models conforming to the normal NMRA standards. Proto and finescale rails and wheels are generally not compatible with the normal scale model railway material with the same scale ratio.

Proto scale was originally developed by the Model Railway Study Group in Great Britain in 1966 and later adopted into NMRA standards with modifications necessary for the North American prototype railway standards. Proto scale reproduces faithfully the prototype wheel tread profile and track work used by the Association of American Railroads and the American Railway Engineering Association.

Finescale reproduces the prototype wheel tread profile and track work used by the Association of American Railroads and the American Railway Engineering Association with minor compromises for performance and manufacturability.

==== NMRA popular railway scales ====
Scale	Ratio	Model gauge	Notes
Z	1:220	6.5 mm (0.256 in)	NMRA does not give any other dimensions for Z scale apart from the gauge The s.g. is set nominally to gauge=6.5 mm; more exact to 1:220 would be 6.52 mm (0.257 in)
Nn2	1:160	0.177 in (4.5 mm); 4.5 mm (0.177 in)	narrow gauge
Nn3	1:160	0.256 in (6.5 mm); 6.5 mm (0.256 in)	narrow gauge
N	1:160	0.353 in (8.97 mm)	standard gauge
TT	1:120	0.470 in (11.94 mm); 0.472 in (12 mm); 12 mm (0.472 in)	standard gauge
HOn2 or 3.5 mm	1:87.1	7 mm (0.276 in)	narrow gauge
HOn30 or 3.5 mm	1:87.1	9 mm (0.354 in) (0.353 in)	narrow gauge – N-scale track can be used
HOn3 or 3.5 mm	1:87.1	10.5 mm (0.413 in)	narrow gauge
HOm or 3.5 mm	1:87.1	12 mm (0.472 in)	narrow gauge – TT-scale track can be used
HO or 3.5 mm	1:87.1	0.65 in (16.5 mm)	standard gauge
OO or 4 mm	1:76.2	16.5 mm (0.65 in)	standard gauge
Sn3 or 3/16 in	1:64	0.563 in (14.3 mm)	narrow gauge
S or 3/16 in	1:64	0.883 in (22.43 mm)	standard gauge
On2 or 1/4 in	1:48	12.7 mm (0.5 in)	narrow gauge
On30 or 1/4 in	1:48	HO-track	narrow gauge
On3 or 1/4 in	1:48	0.75 in (19.05 mm); 19.4 mm (0.764 in) (?)	narrow gauge
O or 1/4 in	1:48	1.25 in (31.75 mm)	1.177 in (29.9 mm) is true standard gauge
No. 1n2 or 3/8 in	1:32	0.75 in (19.05 mm)	narrow gauge (same as On3 gauge)
No. 1n3 or 3/8 in	1:32	1.125 in (28.6 mm)	narrow gauge
No. 1 or 3/8 in	1:32	1.766 in (44.85 mm)	standard gauge
Fn3 or 15 mm	1:20.32	No. 1-track	narrow gauge
F or 15 mm	1:20.32	2.781 in (70.69 mm)	Identical to Proto 20.32 except the wheel flange depth
3/4 in	1:16	3 1/2 in (89 mm)	standard gauge
1 in	1:12	4 3/4 in (121 mm)	Common gauge for Live Steam

Note: to interpret the number in the left-hand column, these examples illustrate:

- 3.5 mm scale (HO): 3.5 mm scale measurement = 1 foot (304.8 mm) prototype. The ratio is therefore 1:87.08571, usually reported as 1:87.
- 1 in scale: 1 in scale measurement = 1 foot prototype, the ratio is reported as 1:12.

==== NMRA deep flange scales ====
Scale	Ratio	Gauge	Notes
S_{HR} or 3/16 in	1:64	0.865 in (21.97 mm) vs. 0.865 in (22 mm)	–
O_{27}	–	–	Same as O_{HR} but models 10% smaller on the same track gauge
O_{HR} or 1/4 in	1:48	1.25 in (31.75 mm)	–
G or 3/8 in	1:32	1.772 in (45 mm)	–
G	1:29	1.772 in (45 mm)	–
G	1:24	1.772 in (45 mm)	–
G	1:22.5	1.772 in (45 mm)	–
G	1:20.3	1.772 in (45 mm)	–

==== NMRA proto scales ====
Scale	Ratio	Gauge	Notes
Proto:20.32	1:20.32	70.69 mm (2.781 in)	NMRA
Proto:20.32n3	1:20.32	1.772 in (45 mm)	–
Proto:32	1:32	1.766 in (44.85 mm)	–
Proto:32n3	1:32	1.125 in (28.6 mm)	–
Proto:48w5	1:48	1.25 in (31.75 mm)	Russian prototypes
Proto:48	1:48	1.177 in (29.9 mm)	–
Proto:48n3	1:48	0.75 in (19.05 mm)	–
Proto:64	1:64	0.883 in (22.43 mm)	–
Proto:64n3	1:64	0.563 in (14.3 mm)	–
Proto:87	1:87.1	0.65 in (16.5 mm)	–
Proto:87n3	1:87.1	0.413 in (10.5 mm)	–

==== NMRA finescale ====
Scale	Ratio	Gauge	Notes
Fine:HO	1:87.1	0.65 in (16.5 mm)	–
Fine:HOn3	1:87.1	0.413 in (10.5 mm)	–
Fine:TT	1:120	0.470 in (11.94 mm); 0.472 in (12 mm)	–
Fine:N	1:160	0.353 in (8.97 mm)	–
Fine:Nn3	1:160	0.25 in (6.35 mm)	–

=== British ===
The main railways in Great Britain use the international standard gauge of 4 ft 8 1/2 in (1,435 mm) but the loading gauge is narrower and lower than in the rest of Europe with the same standard gauge. This is one of the main reasons why the country has traditionally used its own distinctive model railway scales which can rarely be found outside the British Isles.

When H0 scale was being introduced, the motors available were too large to fit in scale-sized bodies and so as a compromise the scale was increased from 3.5 mm to 4 mm to the foot, but the gauge was not changed so other elements could be shared. For 00 therefore the track is about 12.5% narrower than it should be for the scale used. EM and P4 standards correct this anomaly by adopting a wider track gauge.

The globally more-widespread international NEM and NMRA scale standards are relatively rare in Great Britain and used almost exclusively by those modelling foreign prototypes.

Scale	Ratio	Gauge	Notes
000 or 2 mm	1:152	9.42 mm (0.371 in)	An early predecessor of small scales like N. Developed before World War II and became somewhat popular in the 1950s. No commercial products available. Today The 2mm Scale Association is the force behind the scale and 2 mm scale has become a finescale alternative to the British N-scale.
N	1:148	9 mm (0.354 in)	A British adaptation of N-scale for modelling British prototypes with a smaller loading gauge. Has a track gauge error of approximately −7%. Hobbyists who model European or American prototypes in Britain use the standard N-scale with the scale ratio 1:160.
TT:120 or 2.54 mm	1:120	12 mm (0.472 in)	Track was introduced by Peco in 2022, closely followed by a range of locomotives, rolling stock and track from Hornby. This has the accurate scale and gauge combination of 2.54 mm : 1 ft on 12 mm track, as has been used by European and American hobbyists, who refer to this as TT.
TT3 or 3 mm	1:102	12 mm (0.472 in)	Introduced by Triang in 1957 as a British adaptation of the American TT scale. Later Triang dropped this scale in favour of N scale and today there is no commercial following. Has a track gauge error of approximately −15% (the rolling stock superstructures are too large for its gauge). Those models can drive on straight and curved sections of German BTTB Standard Gleis except crossings and switches.
H0 or 3.5 mm	1:87	16.5 mm (0.65 in)	H0 scale was introduced in Britain in the 1920s, and although it stayed as the most common worldwide modelling scale, in Britain H0 has little commercial availability and is generally only used to model the British prototype by a small number of modellers.
00 or 4 mm	1:76	16.5 mm (0.65 in)	The most popular railway modelling scale in Britain. The correct track gauge at the scale of 4 mm per foot should be approximately 18.8 mm. At 16.5 mm, it has a track gauge error of approximately −12.4%.
EM or 4 mm	1:76	18.2 mm (0.717 in)	This gauge is represented by the EM Society (in full, Eighteen Millimetre Society). 00 track (16.5 mm) is the wrong gauge for 1:76 scale, but use of an 18.2 mm (0.717 in) gauge track is accepted as the most popular compromise towards scale dimensions without having to make significant modifications to ready-to-run models. Has a track gauge error of approximately −3.5%.
P4/S4 or 4 mm	1:76.2	18.83 mm (0.741 in)	Uses a track gauge of 18.83 mm which represents an exact scaling down of the prototype at 4 mm to 1 ft scale. P4 contains an allowance for the tighter curves found on model railways in the wheel back-to-back and related dimensions. S4 removes this allowance, for a dead-scale representation of all trackwork dimensions. Both standards are now maintained by the Scalefour Society and are now applied to other prototypical track gauges (such as Irish broad gauge).
S	1:64	22.45 mm (0.884 in)	S-scale is the same proportion in NEM, NMRA and the UK. S Scale Model Railway Society is the custodian of British S-scale.
O14	1:43.5	14 mm (0.551 in)	For accurately representing 2 ft narrow gauge in 7 mm scale.
0 or 7 mm	1:43.5	32 mm (1.26 in)	Three sub-standards: coarse, unified and fine. Has a track gauge error of approximately −3%.
ScaleSeven (S7) 7 mm	1:43.5	33 mm (1.3 in)	A finescale represented by The ScaleSeven group.

=== Japanese ===
While there are Japanese model railway manufacturers that export their products to other parts of the world and follow the scale standards of the export destinations, in Japan there are several domestic scales that are popular in the country but virtually unknown elsewhere. International NEM and NMRA scales are also used by some Japanese modellers. The main reason for the domestic scales different from international standards is the smaller prototype loading gauge and unusual gauges of Japanese railways: 600 mm (1 ft 11 5/8 in), 762 mm (2 ft 6 in) and 1,067 mm (3 ft 6 in) are used, along with standard gauge of 1,435 mm (4 ft 8 1/2 in).

Scale	Ratio	Gauge	Notes
T	1:450; 1:480	3 mm (0.118 in)	Launched at 2006 Tokyo Toy Show by Eishindo Co.
ZZ	1:300	4.8 mm (0.189 in)	Introduced 2005 by Bandai
Z or ZJ	1:220	6.5 mm (0.256 in)	
N	1:150; 1:160	9 mm (0.354 in)	The most popular scale in Japan. For models of Shinkansen high speed trains and other systems using standard gauge track, the international N scale standard ratio of 1:160 is commonly used.
TT9	1:120	9 mm (0.354 in)	Used also in New Zealand.
HOn2 1/2	1:87	9 mm (0.354 in)	Used for 2 ft 6 in (762 mm) narrow gauge.
13 mm	1:80	13 mm (0.512 in)	Correct for 1,067 mm (3 ft 6 in) Japanese narrow gauge.
#16	1:80	16.5 mm (0.65 in)	Used for ready-to-run models of 1,067 mm (3 ft 6 in) prototypes.
HO	1:87	16.5 mm (0.65 in)	Used for models of Shinkansen high speed trains and other systems using standard gauge track.
HOj or HOn3-1/2	1:87	12 mm (0.472 in)	Correct for 1,067 mm (3 ft 6 in) Japanese narrow gauge.
Sn3 1/2	1:64	16.5 mm (0.65 in)	Used for ready-to-run models.
-	1:50	20.5 mm (0.807 in)	Static models mostly.
OJ	1:45	24 mm (0.945 in)	Correct for 1,067 mm (3 ft 6 in) Japanese narrow gauge.
O	1:45 (1:40-1:42)	32 mm (1.26 in)	1:40-1:42 used about 1930s.
35 mm	1:30	35 mm (1.378 in)	Used for 1,067 mm (3 ft 6 in) Japanese narrow gauge.
# I or 45 mm	1:30	45 mm (1.772 in)	

=== Lego trains ===
Lego trains use a fixed nominal gauge of 37.5 mm (1 15/32 in), based on 5-stud (40mm) centerline gauge.

The 37.5 mm length is not derived by a certain scale ratio. This is in contrast to other model railway systems such as HO scale of which has a 1:87 scale (3.5 mm to 1 foot), resulting in a 16.5 mm (0.65 in) gauge from real life prototype 1,435 mm (4 ft 8 1/2 in) standard gauge standard gauge.

Conversely, modeling standard gauge in Lego trains would yield a scaling of (37.5:1435 =) 1:38.3.

Scale	Ratio	Gauge	Notes
Lego Trains	varies	37.5mm (1.476 in)	Not by fixed scale ratio.
Lego Narrow Gauge	varies	21.5mm (0.846 in)	Not by fixed scale ratio.

=== Live steam ===
Live steam model railways are not standardized systematically by any single standardization body. There are, however, certain scales and gauges which have become de facto standards and in some cases correspond to either NEM or NMRA standard scales. One example is the "IBLS" (International Brotherhood of Live Steamers), an informal organization which has published standards for some of the gauges. Many clubs have their own standards, which also may vary slightly from country to country. Hornby Railways have pioneered commercial model live steam in 00 (1:76 scale on 16.5 mm gauge), the existing models are heated using a controllable electric current through the two running rails and have the steam pressure chamber in the model tender.

In addition to these scales, since the 1980s a scale that is based on the predominant British narrow track gauge of 2 ft (610 mm) has come into use in the United Kingdom. Using 32 mm (1.26 in) - 0 gauge - track, there is an extensive range of 16 mm to the foot scale [1:19] live-steam and other types of locomotives, rolling stock and accessories. Many of these models are dual gauge, and can be converted to run on 45 mm (1.772 in) track (gauge 1), and radio control is common. Locomotives in this scale are generally large and "chunky", and can range from the tiny 0-4-0 seen on Welsh slate quarry lines all the way up to the very largest found in the UK, such as the ex-ACR NG/G16 Beyer-Garratt locomotives, seen running on the Welsh Highland Railway in North Wales. The hobby is supported by a number of 16 mm live steam and electric traction builders, dominated by the likes of Roundhouse Engineering and Accucraft UK.

Scale	Ratio	Standard gauge	Notes
00	1:76	16.5 mm (0.65 in)	Hornby produced. Generally regarded as the smallest scale for live steam. Discontinued in 2011 due to poor sales and reliability of the units. The operating instructions from Hornby were incorrect and led to many locomotives being broken after derailing and crashing to the floor. There is still much interest and lively sales of secondhand sets. The 00 Live Steam Club also promotes the product.
O	1:45	32 mm (1.26 in)	Popularly used for the small scale live steam.
No. 1	1:32	45 mm (1.772 in)	Popularly used for the small scale live steam. Corresponds to NEM 1 or NMRA No. 1.
No. 3	1:22.6	2 1/2 in (64 mm)	The smallest scale able to pull real passengers. Was one of the first popular live steam gauges, developed in England in the early 1900s. In terms of model railway operation, gauge 3 is the largest (standard gauge) scenic railway modelling scale, using a scale of 13.5 mm to the foot. The Gauge '3' Society represents this aspect of 2 1/2-inch gauge railway modelling with both electric and live steam operation. Gauge '3' corresponds to NEM II scale, also known as "Spur II" in Germany. The National 2.5 in Gauge Association continues to support live steam passenger hauling in 2.5-inch gauge using MES tracks. They use a "scale" appropriate to the original prototype modelling both standard and narrow gauge locomotives to run on 2.5-inch track.
-	1:16	3 1/2 in (89 mm)	A worldwide garden railroad scale. Corresponds to NEM III and NMRA 3/4 inch.
-	1:12	4 3/4 in (121 mm)	North America specific scale corresponding to NMRA 1-inch scale. 1:12 is one of the most popular backyard railway scales.
-	1:11	5 in (127 mm)	Used outside North America. Corresponds to NEM V. One of the most popular garden railway scales. Common gauge for live steam
-	1:8	7 1/4 in (184 mm)	Used in North-Eastern US, Canada, Europe and other parts of the world. Corresponds to NEM VII. Common gauge for live steam
-	1:8	7 1/2 in (190.5 mm)	Used in the Western parts of the US. Common gauge for live steam
-	1:7.5		1.6 in=1 ft. Used in the US, often finer-scale. Uses 7 1/2 in (190.5 mm) gauge. Common gauge for live steam

=== Static model ===
Scale	Ratio	Gauge	Notes
41 mm	1:35	41 mm (1.614 in)	41 mm is used by several static model manufacturers, often for models of military subjects such as railway guns as 1:35 is a popular scale for military vehicle modelling. 41 mm was introduced in the 2000s.

=== Historical ===
There have been many short-lived and often promising model railway scales, most of which are defunct.

Scale	Ratio	Gauge	Notes
K	1:180	8 mm (0.315 in)	Introduced 1948 at the Hannover Fair in Germany by Walter M. Kersting.
Wesa	1:110	13 mm (0.512 in)	Produced by WESA AG in Switzerland Between 1945 and 1950, used AC power.
Wesa	1:100	13 mm (0.512 in)	Produced by WESA AG in Switzerland Between 1950 and 1966, used DC power.
OOO	–	22 mm (0.866 in)	Introduced in 1902 by Schoenner in Germany.
OO	–	23 mm (0.906 in)	Introduced in 1908 by Märklin and sold under name "Liliput-Eisenbahn" until 1932.
Z0	1:60	24 mm (0.945 in)	Z0 or "Zwischen Null" (between 0) was in use in the 1940s and 1950s by several model railway manufacturers in Germany. Standardized in East German NORMAT model railway standard collection. Z0 was originally introduced in Czechoslovakia in 1938.
35 mm	1:30	35 mm (1.378 in)	35 mm was in use in the 1930s and 1940s by several model railway manufacturers in Japan. 35 mm was introduced in the 1930s. Late 1940s 35 mm was replaced by O gauge.
No. 2	1:27	2 in (50.8 mm)	English scale, 7/16 inch to 1 foot. Commercially used about 1900

== Mixing of scales ==
It is possible to use different scales of models together effectively, especially to create a false sense of depth (referred to as "forced perspective"). Scales close to each other are also hard to tell apart with the naked eye. An onlooker seeing a 1:43 model car next to a 1:48 scale model train would probably not notice the difference.

Some common examples of mixing scales are:

- a foreshortening technique using N scale (1:160) model trains in the background (distance) with HO scale (1:87) in the foreground.
- mixing 1:43 scale, 1:48 scale and 1:50 scale die-cast models with O scale model trains.
- using Matchbox cars (1:64 to 1:100) with HO scale and S scale.
- mixing OO scale British model trains with HO scale models. Both scales run on the same track but OO is slightly larger in scale.
- using 1:144 scale die-cast models with N scale.

== List of scales ==
Name	Scale	Gauge	Comments	Picture
Grand Scale	1:4 and up	254 mm and up	10 in (254 mm). Several large scales exist, but are not strictly model railroading gauges. Instead, they are used mostly in commercial settings, such as amusement park rides.	
Live steam	1:8	184 mm or 190.5 mm	Ridable, outdoor gauge, named according to the gauge in inches, and scale in inches per foot, for example 7 1/4 in (184 mm) gauge, 1.5 inch scale. The gauge is 7 1/2 in (190.5 mm) in the US and Canada, where the scale sometimes is 1.6 inch for diesel-type models. Private and public (club) tracks exist in many areas. Among is them the world's largest model railroad: Train Mountain Railroad, with over 25 miles (40 km) of tracks. Powerful locomotives can pull 50 or more passengers. Narrow-gauge models in this gauge can be as large as 1:3 scale.	
5-inch Live steam	1:12	127 mm or 121 mm	Ridable, outdoor gauge. The gauge is 5 in (127 mm) in Europe, but 4 3/4 in (121 mm) in US and Canada. For standard gauge prototypes at 5 inch, the correct scale is 1 1/16 inch per foot or approximately 1:11.3. Alternatively 1.1/8 inch per foot is adopted, only Australia for ease of conversion. allowing a scale of 3/32 inch per full size inch. This results in an oversize locomotive and often negates building inside valve gear locomotives (such as the GWR King Class 4-6-0) due to frame width restrictions caused by 5 in (127 mm) gauge track. Together with the 1:8 scale above, this is a popular scale for backyard railroads. Pulling power is enough for more than a dozen passengers on level tracks.	
SE scale 7/8 inch	1:13.71	45 mm	Models of 2 ft (610 mm) gauge prototypes using 45 mm (1.772 in) track. Used by enthusiasts modelling the Maine 2-footers, but increasingly also by anyone interested in very large scale models of industrial prototypes, including the many Welsh slate mines and other European operations. Although this is mostly a scratch-builders scale, there is an increasing supply of kits, parts and figures. Some modelers using 7/8 scale operate on 32 mm (1.26 in) track, used to replicate 18 in (457 mm) gauge industrial lines found in Great Britain and other countries.	
Live steam	1:16	89 mm	Ridable, outdoor gauge. The gauge is 3 1/2 in (89 mm) the world over. Originally defined to be 89 mm 3 gauge in Europe.	
Gauge 3	1:22.6	63.5 mm	One of the original model railroad scales standardized in 1909, a minority interest, which is undergoing a revival in the UK and in Germany (where it is known as Spur II). 64 mm (2 1/2 in) gauge 3 track is commercially available, as are a growing number of locomotive and rolling stock kits. The European standard of 1:22.5 scale trains on 45 mm (1.772 in) track is called IIm scale, as per European narrow-gauge naming conventions or G scale, its popular name.	
Live steam	1:24	63 mm	At 2 1/2 in (64 mm), this is the smallest of the "ridable" gauges. Only one or two passengers can be pulled. This was one of the first popular live steam gauges, developed in England in the early 1900s, though now less popular than the larger gauges it still has a following. A model can normally be lifted by one person.	
Wide gauge	1:26.59 or 1:28.25	53.975 mm	Called Standard Gauge by Lionel, which trademarked the name. Other manufacturers used the same gauge and called it Wide Gauge. Not widely produced after 1940. Gauge No. 2 using track of gauge 2 in (50.8 mm) was one of the standard model gauges in 1909.	
16 mm scale	1:19.05	32 mm or 45mm	This scale was first developed in the UK in the 1950s to depict 2 ft (610 mm) narrow-gauge prototypes using 32 mm (1.26 in) or "O gauge" track and wheels, but really took off in popularity during the 1960s and 1970s. Originally, it was mostly used as an indoor modelling scale, but has now developed as a popular scale for garden railways of narrow-gauge prototypes. Some manufacturers that produce models depicting North American 2 ft (610 mm) narrow-gauge prototypes have also adopted this scale for use alongside the near-compatible Fn3 (15 mm or 1:20.32) scale on 45 mm (1.772 in) track already popular in the US. Both electric, battery and live steam propulsion is used to power model locomotives in this scale, and is supported by a large and established range of commercially available ready-to-run models, kits and parts.	
Fn3 scale	1:20.3	45 mm	Similar to G Scale below, this scale also uses 45 mm (1.772 in) gauge track, and is used for both indoor and garden railways of narrow-gauge prototypes. The scale of 1:20.3 was developed to depict North American 3 ft (914 mm) gauge trains in exact proportion to their correct track gauge whilst using 45 mm (1.772 in) gauge model track. It equates to 15 mm = 1 foot (1:20.32) scale. Increasingly popular for both electric and live steam propulsion of model locomotives, with an ever-growing range of commercially available ready-to-run models, kits and parts. Fn3 scale, together with G scale and 1/2 inch (1:24) scale, are commonly and collectively referred to as "Large Scale" by many modelers.	
Fn2 scale	1:20.3	30 mm	Used by mostly American and European modelers wishing to model smaller industrial prototypes, including two-footers; this is a minority scale. While 30 mm track is prototypically accurate for 2 ft (610 mm) narrow-gauge, tracks are only available from Regner. For modelling 2 ft gauge prototypes using 32 mm ‘O gauge’ track see 16 mm scale.	
G scale	various	45 mm	Originally from the German groß (meaning "big"), now also G as in Garden, G scale is generally used for garden railways of narrow-gauge prototypes, and uses the same track gauge as 1 gauge, below. The scale ranges approximately from 1/19 to 1/29, according to the size and gauge of the prototype.	
Gn15	various	16.5 mm	Evolved around the Millennium (possibly earlier), much in the same manner than On30, HOn30, and Nn3 have, which is the desire to model in a larger scale, but using the track gauge, mechanisms and wheelsets of a smaller scale; in this case HO/OO. If Gn15 did not start in the UK, it certainly has the largest following there. Some model "estate railways", inspired by the Eaton Hall Railway built at the end of the 19th century by Sir Arthur Haywood, while others simply desired a means of modeling in something close to half-inch scale in a small space. This scale is closely aligned with the "micro layout" movement.	
IIm scale	1:22.5	45 mm	Similar to G scale above, this scale also uses 45 mm (1.772 in) gauge track, and is used for both indoor and garden railways of narrow-gauge prototypes. It depicts 1 metre gauge trains in exact proportion to their correct track gauge.	
1/2 inch scale	1:24	45 mm	Similar to G scale above, this scale also runs on 45 mm (1.772 in) gauge track, and is generally used for both indoor and garden railways of narrow-gauge prototypes. The scale of 1:24 in combination with 45 mm (1.772 in) track is an attempt to model North American and UK 3 ft (914 mm) narrow-gauge or 3 ft 6 in (1,067 mm) gauge trains in better proportion to the rails they run on.	
2 gauge	1:29	50.4 mm or 45 mm	The dominant scale used in the United States for models of "standard gauge" trains running on 45 mm (1.772 in) track, even though 1:32 is more prototypically correct. 1:29 represents standard gauge using 2 in (50.8 mm) gauge track, the original gauge 2. This fell into disuse as gauge 1 at 1.75 inch was very close. Some manufacturers kept the scale for the models but running them on slightly narrow gauge track.	
1 gauge 3/8 inch scale	1:32	45 mm	This large scale, once rarely seen indoors in modern use but frequently used for modelling standard-gauge trains as garden railways, is making a comeback. The Japanese firm of Aster Hobby offers ready-to-run gas-fired live steam models. Accucraft Trains also offer finely crafted live steam models in this scale. Gauge 1 has seen something of a remarkable revival in recent years after decades of near extinction commercially, with a growing number of smaller UK manufacturers offering electrically powered and live steam locomotives and rolling stock in ready to run, parts and kit form. Some manufacturers offer so-called Gauge 1 items in 1:30.48 scale (10 mm = 1 foot) that also run on 45 mm (1.772 in) gauge track. Gauge 1 also has its own international association.	
Static Model	1:35 (nominal)	41 mm	Only used Static Models.	
L gauge	various	37.5 mm	Unofficial designation of toy trains built from Lego. Equipment can be built to differing widths in relation to the track gauge, and are becoming increasingly popular among persons who grew up with the building toy system. With Technic axles and custom train wheels, it is possible to build Lego trains wider than standard 6-stud wide to fit into any gauge like G or O gauge.	
Q scale	1:45	32 mm	Developed in the United States so that 1 1/4 in (32 mm) gauge track correctly represents standard gauge. Generally used by traction modelers.	
O scale	1:43.5 (UK, France); 1:45 (Germany, Japan, Russia, Czech); 1:48 (US)	32 mm	Name originally was "0" (zero), "1" through "6" were already in use for larger scales. In the US, this is sometimes considered a "toy train" scale rather than for scale modelers. However, though toy trains use this gauge, they are often nowhere near scale. Scale modellers have begun to use this gauge for their scale models, resulting in a two separate groups of modelers within this "scale": "hi-railers", those who run toy train equipment on oversized track and scale modelers, who run scale equipment on scale track. A limited few have been able to combine both. Nowadays, even high-railers have the option of extremely precise scale models and track. Lionel, MTH Electric Trains, and Atlas O are major manufacturers of this scale. The best-known brand in Great Britain was that of Bassett-Lowke until the firm first closed in 1965. While in Russia and former Soviet countries is used gauge of 1,520 mm (4 ft 11 27/32 in), but for the models used the NEM. Therefore, the gauge is 32 mm, rather than about 34 mm. In this models of the rolling stock are made in scale 1:45. The smallest scale for O Scale is 1:58. In O scale terms, this is known as Mini-O Scale and in S Scale terms it is known as Major S Scale.	1:45 (0)
O-27 scale	1:48 (US)	31.7 mm	A Lionel variant on O-scale. Has a slightly shorter profile and sharper 27 inch diameter curves (but also comes in 42, 54 and 72 inch diameter curves) than typical oversized O scale track. Often, but not always, mechanically compatible with O-gauge trains.	
ScaleSeven	1:43.5	33 mm	Exact scale version of British O gauge supported by a dedicated UK based society. The ScaleSeven Group defined more scale measures more strictly (e.g., the model gauge of 33 mm is fixed). Apart from standard gauge, it also defined Irish and Brunel gauges to this scale.	
Proto:48	1:48	29.90 mm	These are to the same scale as US O gauge but are accurate scale models in all dimensions including track and wheels.	
OJ	1:45	24.0 mm	O-scale models of 3 ft 6 in narrow-gauge prototypes running on 24 mm gauge track. Virtually unknown outside Japan and Taiwan	
On2	1:48	12.7 mm	O-scale models of 2 ft narrow-gauge prototypes running on 1/2 in (12.7 mm) gauge track.	
On30 gauge	1:48	16.5 mm	Narrow gauge O-scale models running on HO gauge track. This scale was initially created by American "kit-bashing" modelers desiring large scale narrow gauge at low cost, at a time when the existing On3 market was dominated by expensive brass models. They put small O-scale superstructures on HO-scale mechanisms and trucks, but when the large company Bachmann issued train sets — originally intended to run around Christmas trees — On30 really took off. Also used in Australia to model 2'6" and other narrow gauge prototypes.	
On3	1:48	19 mm	O-scale models of 3 ft narrow-gauge prototypes running on 3/4 in (19 mm) gauge track.	
O16.5	1:43.5	16.5 mm	British narrow gauge running on HO gauge track. Prototypes of many diverse gauges are depicted in this scale, as well as fictitious lines. Even two-foot lines — particularly slate — are represented, although serious modelers with this interest generally prefer O-14.	
0e	1:45	16.5 mm	Continental European (mostly German and Austrian) narrow gauge running on HO gauge track. Fleischmann produced the Magic Train line, intended for the toy market, but also adopted by serious modelers, particularly when supplemented with protypical details — or "bashed" to be closer to the prototype. A number of smaller manufacturers produce a wide range of elements, including the high-end Henke, offering exquisitely accurate models for a handsome price. 0e has many active participants in Germany, with frequent Fremo modular meets on weekends.	
O14	1:43.5	14 mm	Accurate modelling of 2 ft narrow gauge in 7 mm:ft/1:43.5 scale supported by an informal web based society.	
O-12	1:43.5	12 mm	British narrow gauge representing prototypes of narrower than 2-foot gauge, running on TT gauge track.	
Z0 scale	1:60	24 mm	Got attention in Germany around 1950 as an attempt of a scale between O and HO. Z0 means "Zwischen-Null" (between O).	
S scale	1:64	22.42 mm	Originally called "H-1" because it was half the size of Gauge 1 (1:32), the "S" name is derived from "sixty-fourth". In the US, American Flyer toy trains used this gauge, but it is also used for more precise modelling and supported by several manufacturers. In the UK, S scale modelling is largely the preserve of a dedicated few hand-building models or using a small number of available kits and parts, mostly depicting standard gauge prototypes but also narrow and broad gauge subjects too. The UK-based S Scale Model Railway Society is the oldest scale support society in the world, being first established in 1946. In the United States, S scale has a small but growing following in the modelling of standard-gauge railroads, especially those of the 1940s and 1950s era, a focus that is supported by S Helper Service and American Models, among others. This scale is also popular in North America to depict 3 ft (914 mm) narrow-gauge prototypes (using dedicated 14.28 mm (0.562 in) gauge track and known as "Sn3"), and elsewhere to depict the 3 ft 6 in (1,067 mm) narrow-gauge railways (using H0 scale 16.5 mm / 0.65 in gauge track and known as "Sn3 1/2") of South Africa, Australia and New Zealand.	1:64 (S)
OO gauge	1:76.2	16.5 mm	This scale is today the most popular modelling scale in the UK, although it once had some following in the US (on 19 mm / 0.748 in gauge track) before World War II. 00 or "Double-Oh", together with EM gauge and P4 standards are all to 4 mm scale as the scale is the same, but the track standards are incompatible. 00 uses the same track as HO (16.5 mm / 0.65 in gauge), which is not correct for this slightly larger scale, but it is the most common British standard for ready-to-run trains. In Britain there exists The Double 0 Gauge Association to promote this scale.	1:76.2 (00)
OO9	1:76.2	9 mm	Narrow-gauge modelling of approximately 2 ft (610 mm) or 2 ft 6 in (762 mm) prototypes on 9mm gauge (the same as N scale) track. It supported by a dedicated society and has a flourishing supply of kits and parts from many small UK-based suppliers, along with ready to run products from manufacturers such as PECO and Bachmann.	
0012	1:76.2	12 mm	Narrow-gauge modelling of 3 ft (914 mm) prototypes on 12mm gauge (the same as TT scale) track.	
EM gauge	1:76.2	18.2 mm	EM gauge was an earlier attempt in the 1950s to improve the inaccuracies of OO gauge, with wider, more accurate track at 18 mm (0.709 in) between the rails, but still narrower than the correct gauge. The gauge was later widened to 18.2 mm (0.717 in). The UK-based EM Gauge Society exists to supports modellers of these standards.	
P4	1:76.2	18.83 mm	P4 was created in the 1960s as the most accurate possible standards for modelling in 4 mm scale. Supported by the UK-based Scalefour Society.	
HOj scale	1:80	16.5 mm	Used for modelling 3 ft 6 in (1,067 mm) Japanese and Taiwanese prototypes on 16.5 mm track. (Note that this isn't accurate: 1,067 divided by 16.5 would lead to a 1:64.7 scale. 1/80 rolling stock that uses more accurate 13 mm gauge does exist, though it is rare at the time of writing.)	
HO scale	1:87	16.5 mm	This is the most popular model railway scale in the world, although not in the United Kingdom. The name is derived from "Half of 0". The European NEM define the scale as exactly 1:87, while the US NMRA defines it as exactly 3.5 mm : 1 ft (approximately 1:87.1). There is a vast selection of ready-to-run, kits and parts for locomotives, rolling stock and scenic items from many manufacturers depicting trains from all around the world.	
Proto:87	1:87	16.5 mm	An alternative finescale standard for HO, with wheels and track that correspond with the prototype's, taking its lead from the establishment of P4 standards in the UK	
HOn3 1/2 scale; H0m gauge; in Europe	1:87	12.00 mm	H0 scale using 12 mm (0.472 in) gauge track to represent 3 ft 6 in (1,067 mm) used as "standard" gauge in many African countries, New Zealand, Queensland, Japan, etc. European H0m (metre-gauge) models represent prototype gauges ranging between 850 and 1,250 mm (33.5 and 49.2 in).	
HOn3	1:87	10.5 mm	H0 scale using 3-scale-foot narrow-gauge track.	
HOe gauge	1:87	9 mm	European HO scale narrow-gauge models using 9 mm (0.354 in) (the same as N scale) track to represent prototypes with gauge between 650 and 850 mm (25.6 and 33.5 in), particularly 750 mm (2 ft 5 1/2 in) and 760 mm (2 ft 5 15/16 in) gauge.	
HOn2 gauge	1:87	7 mm	American HO scale narrow-gauge models using 7 mm (0.276 in) track to represent American prototypes, especially those in Maine, with a 2-foot track gauge. No known commercial activity; instead, European H0f gauge material and rolling stock is rebranded as "HOn2" for the North American market.	
H0f gauge	1:87	6.5 mm	European H0 Scale narrow-gauge models using 6.5 mm (0.256 in), the same as Z scale track, to represent Feldbahn-style 2 ft and 600 mm gauge railways with prototype gauges between 500 and 650 mm (19.7 and 25.6 in). The "f" refers to "Feldbahn" ("field railway"), and these narrower track gauges were frequently used for industrial operations all across Europe. Some of these lines survived until 2000 and even later, particularly in Eastern Europe, where they remained economically viable later than in west Europe. In 2010 the German company Busch announced a mine railway (Grubenbahn) system, followed later in 2012 by a much more extensive array of narrow gauge locomotives, rolling stock and trackwork. The Busch Feldbahn track system features a steel strip between the rails, and magnets on the rolling stock to increase adhesion for tracking and increased engine performance.	
3 mm scale	1:101.6	12 mm or 14.2 mm	A UK version of TT introduced by the firm Tri-ang in the late 1950s (then known as "TT-3") and supported by several other firms offering kits and parts. Commercial production by Tri-ang petered out in the late 1960s, but "The 3 mm Society" was established in 1965 and a dedicated membership has kept this UK scale alive. TT-3 was originally designed to run on TT's 12 mm (0.472 in) gauge track, but latterly the more accurate gauge of 14.125 mm (0.556 in) (popularly known as "14.2") has been adopted by some seeking more accuracy. Like the intermediate EM gauge standard in 4 mm scale, some modellers in 3 mm scale developed 13.5 mm (0.531 in) track gauge, but this has largely been superseded by 14.2 mm (0.559 in) gauge. Both 3 ft (914 mm) narrow gauge (using 9 mm / 0.354 in gauge track) and 5 ft 3 in (1,600 mm) broad gauge (using 15.75 mm / 0.620 in gauge track) are also modeled in 3 mm scale in the UK.	
TT scale	1:120	12 mm	Name stands for "Table Top". It is quite popular in Europe, particularly in Central Europe and Germany, especially in East Germany (former DDR), has some popularity in countries of former USSR and a small following in the United States. Over the last few years it has been growing in popularity in the UK after Hornby and PECO entered the market. This scale is also used to depict 3 ft 6 in (1,067 mm) narrow-gauge railways (using N scale 9 mm / 0.354 in gauge track and known as NZ120) of New Zealand.	
N scale	1:148	9 mm	As with 1:160 N scale below, the name is derived from its Nine millimeter track gauge, but the scale is a slightly larger at 2.0625 mm = 1 foot (1:147.78). Developed as a UK commercial version of N scale in the late 1960s, models are restricted to depicting UK prototypes. Although nominally to 1:148 scale, some manufacturers took significant liberties with exact scale to suit production limitations. Despite the collapse of Graham Farish and its subsequent sale to Bachmann Industries there is a growing choice of ready-to-run models available. A few commercial kits and parts to fit N scale loco mechanisms and wheels are offered by the UK firm PECO to enable narrow-gauge prototypes to be modelled.	
N scale	1:150	9 mm	N scale in Japan is normally built to this scale, even though most rail lines are 3 ft 6 in (1,067 mm) gauge. Because the Shinkansen lines are 1,435 mm (4 ft 8 1/2 in) (standard gauge), models of these are usually built to the scale of 1:160.	
2 mm scale	1:152	9.42 mm	British finescale standard, older than N scale, being first used as long ago as 1927 with photos and articles published in the model press. Became more popular in the 1950s, with The 2 mm Scale Association established by 1960 to promote and support modellers in this tiny scale, and it remains very active in the UK to this day. In recent years, the finer track and wheel standards of 2 mm scale (but not the gauge) have also been adapted for use in 1:160 N scale (on 9 mm / 0.354 in gauge) in Europe and called "fiNe", and is supported by the FREMO modelling organisation. Since the 1950s, 2 mm scale has been used to depict narrow-gauge prototypes on various track gauges down to 4 mm (0.157 in), but almost everything has to be hand-made, unless some Z scale parts are used.	
N scale	1:160	9 mm	Name derived from "Nine millimeter"; this is the second most popular scale worldwide. N scale developed by the German firm of Arnold Rapido in the early 1960s, and was rapidly adopted worldwide as the most popular small-scale modelling choice. In recent years, finer profile wheels and track have been developed by some manufacturers (although the gauge and standards have remained the same). Large range of ready-to-run models available as well as supporting kits and parts. With the introduction of an even smaller Z scale in 1972, the modelling of narrower gauge prototypes has been possible using that scale's locomotive mechanisms, track and wheels. In North America, the depiction of 3 ft (914 mm) gauge railroads in N scale using Z scale track is known as "Nn3"; in Europe, metre-gauge modelling in N scale is known as "Nm".	US model of an N scale (1:160) 2-6-6-2 shown with a pencil for size
Nn3 gauge	1:160	6.5 mm	American N Scale narrow-gauge models using 6.5 mm (0.256 in) (the same as Z scale) track to represent American 3 ft prototypes, especially the in Colorado, with a 3 ft track gauge. This scale-gauge combination has become popular, and has increased commercial support.	
Z scale	1:220	6.5 mm	Until 2005 this was the smallest commercially available model railway scale, introduced by the German firm of Märklin in 1972 depicting German and other European prototypes. In North America, Micro-Trains and others have introduced a range of US prototype models. On both continents, a growing range of kits and scenic accessories are still becoming available to help increase its popularity. In Europe a few enterprising manufacturers have developed even smaller metre-gauge models (but still in 1:220 scale) known as "Zm" on 4.5 mm (0.177 in) gauge track. Japanese manufacturers are increasingly involved in Z scale, with Rokuhan producing what is considered by some the best Z track in the world.	
ZZ scale	1:300	4.8 mm	Introduced by Bandai, ZZ scale was very briefly the smallest commercially available model railway available. As of 2005 only three Shinkansen trains are available and limited other items. The trains are battery-powered and run on plastic rail. Bandai makes no accessories for this scale.	
T scale	1:450; 1:480	3 mm	Announced by Eishindo in 2006 and released for sale in 2008, T gauge is the smallest commercially available model railroading scale in the world. Several trains are available, complete with track, as well as many accessories including buildings, people, trees and vehicles. The trains run on metal rails and controlled by a power supply. Because the Shinkansen lines are 1,435 mm (4 ft 8 1/2 in) (standard gauge), models of these are usually built to the scale of 1:480.	

== See also ==
- Rail transport modelling
- List of scale model sizes
- The Museum of the Moscow Railway
- National Model Railroad Association
- Normen Europäischer Modelleisenbahnen
- Rail transport modelling
- List of narrow gauge model railway scales
