= USA Trains =

- Company type: Private
- Industry: Hobby
- Founded: 1987; 39 years ago
- Founder: Charles Ro, Sr.
- Headquarters: 662 Cross Street, Malden, Massachusetts, United States
- Key people: Charles Ro, Jr.
- Products: Model Trains
- Revenue: 2.5 to 5 million
- Number of employees: 5 to 9
- Parent: Charles Ro Supply Company
- Website: Official website

USA Trains is a manufacturer of G scale model railroad products that started out as Charles Ro Manufacturing Company. They offer two different scale sizes of trains that use the same track; the "Ultimate Series," which is 1:29 scale, and the "American" and "Work Trains" series which is 1:24 scale. USA Trains claims to have the largest collection of G scale rolling stock in the world. USA Trains was established in 1987.

== Charles Ro Supply Company ==
USA Trains started out as part of Charles Ro Supply Company, the biggest train store, as well as America's largest Lionel dealer. USA Trains is a family-run business, started by father and son Charles Ro senior and junior.

=== Lionel ===
Charles Ro Supply Company was established in and it started out as a beauty shop business of 4 salons with sixty hair-dressers but moved into the hobby business when Charles Ro, Sr. began selling used Lionel trains at one of the storefronts in Everett, Massachusetts. In 1972, Ro started purchasing directly from Lionel to sell them mail-order. By 1980, Ro had completed Lionel's first million dollar order. Also at this time, the company moved to a new location in Malden, Massachusetts into an old supermarket building.

=== Garden trains ===
In 1982, Lionel moved production to Mexico, not producing model trains for 9 months. To make up for this, Ro began selling German-made large-scale model trains that were suitable for outdoor use. Realizing their popularity, Ro began making his own large scale model trains under the name Charles Ro Manufacturing Company. In 1989, business was moved into a new building, its current location, in Malden, Massachusetts with 3 stories and over 50,000 square feet (4,600 m^{2}) of area. Until 1995, when manufacturing was moved offshore, USA Trains were manufactured at this new location which also served as the store. USA Trains manufactures locomotives, boxcars, work trains, and an extensive line of billboard reefers—early 20th century iced refrigerator cars with billboard-style advertising graphics on their sides. Many of these are limited edition collectibles, and in addition to prototypical cars, the reefer series includes special commemoratives and dated holiday-themed cars.

== Awards/Recognition ==
- In 1998, the GP 7/9 locomotive won Model Railroader's Reader's Choice Award
- The Ultimate Series line introduced in 1999 won four Reader's Choice Awards
- In 2003, USA Trains J1e Hudson won the 2003 Reader's Choice Award
- USA Trains claims to have the world's largest selection of G scale rolling stock
