= T gauge =

Model railway scale

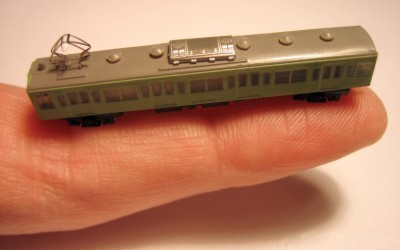
- Scale: 1/40 in (0.635 mm) to 1 ft (305 mm); 2/75 in (0.677 mm) to 1 ft (305 mm); 2 mm to 1 m
- Scale ratio: 1:450 (Japanese 3 ft 6 in (1,067 mm) gauge); 1:480 (Standard gauge); 1:500 (Standard and broad gauge)
- Model gauge: 3 mm (0.118 in)
- Prototype gauge: Commercially available models are of 3 ft 6 in (1,067 mm) gauge.

T gauge (1:450, 1:480 and 1:500) is a model railway scale with a track gauge of 3 mm (0.118 in), referred to as "three-millimeter gauge" or "third of N scale." It was introduced at the Tokyo Toy Show in 2006 by KK Eishindo of Japan and went on sale in 2007. Since mid-2009, Railway Shop (Hong Kong) has been the exclusive licensed manufacturer. In 2013, the Guinness Book of World Records designated T gauge as the " smallest commercially available working model railroad".

The models are battery-powered by a throttle (with an optional AC adapter) at a maximum output of 4.5 V DC. To improve power pickup and tractive effort, the powered cars are fitted with magnetic wheels.

Many of the prototypes are Japanese Shinkansen high speed trains. German, British and American prototypes are also available.

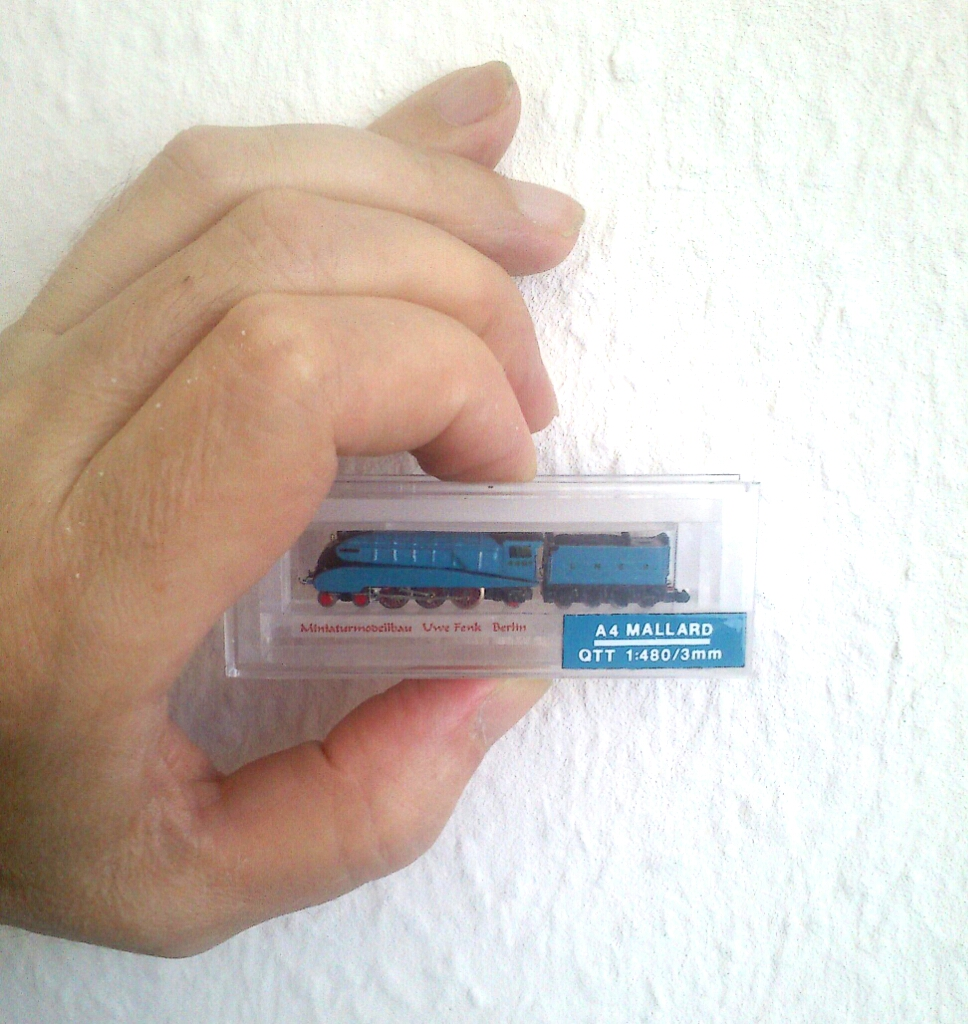
British LNER Class A4 4468 Mallard steam locomotive in T gauge

The first train released was the Japanese 103 series commuter train in different versions. Each standard train set comes with two powered cars, which are located in the middle of the train. The front and rear cars are equipped with directional headlights. The tiny pantographs are made of etched stainless steel. The Hankyu Railway 9000 EMU Series and the Kiha 40 DMU were added to the line of available trainsets in early 2010 and feature improved mechanisms for better performance.

The track is offered as either flexible sections of rail and sleepers at 200, 500 and 750 millimetres (7.87, 19.69 and 29.53 in), or as rigid sections with roadbed, and a small selection of pieces without roadbed. Rigid curved track is available with four different radii: 120 millimetres (4.72 in), 132.5, 145, and 157.5 millimetres (5.22, 5.71, and 6.20 in) in 15° and 30° arc lengths; straight tracks are 30, 60, and 200 millimetres (1.181, 2.362, and 7.874 in) long. Points (switches or turnouts) are available in a single length, right and left-hand, with manual or electric throw. Diamond crossings are made at 30° and 90° angles in a 60mm length. Several miscellaneous track sections are also sold including power, isolating, and level grade crossing. The standard sectional track is "roadbed" style, with integrated ballast, or without roadbed as "fine scale". The rail is approximately 0.040 inches (1.016 mm) high ("Code 40"). Track pieces are connected with gold-plated metal rail joiners plus plastic clips in the roadbed. Different types of dummy catenary masts can be attached to the track. One side effect of the magnetic wheels of the powered units is that they can climb acute grades as steep as 45 degrees.

Operational T gauge model railroads can be set up in very compact spaces. One gamer installed a layout on top of his Graphics processing unit that is visible through a clear window on his computer. Another hobbyist built a hat with a T gauge railroad running around the edge of the hat brim. Since the rolling stock adheres to the track magnetically, this allows operation without derailing due to head motion.

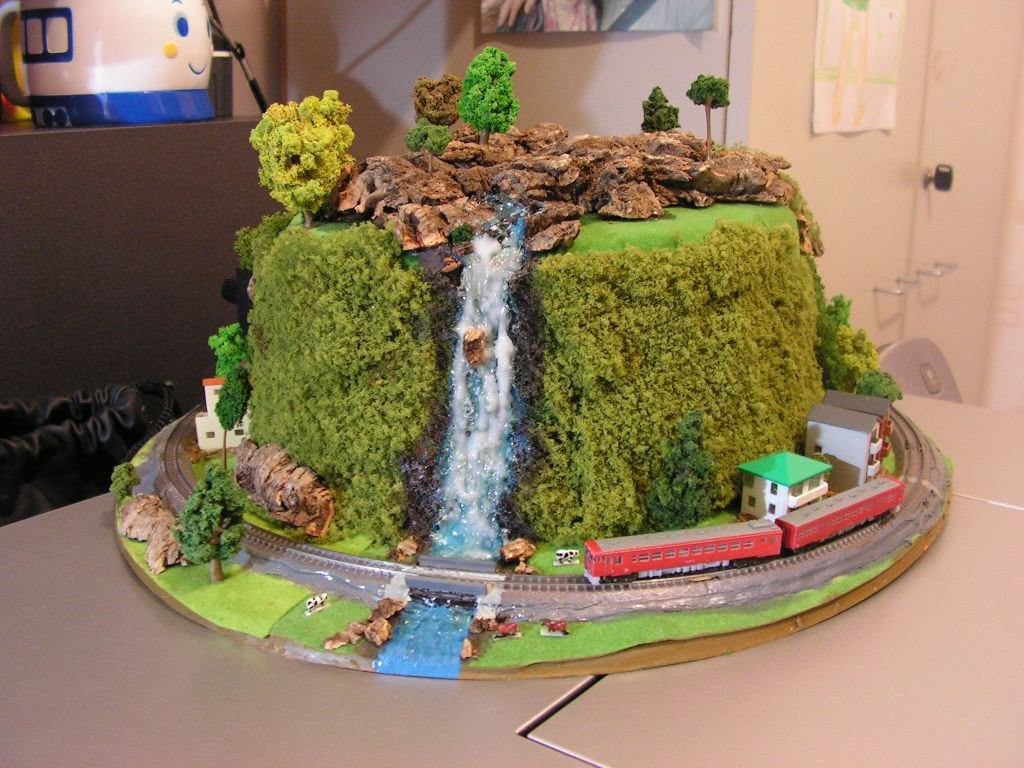
T gauge hat layout, built in Australia in December 2010.

== See also ==
- Rail transport modelling scales
- ZZ scale
