= 1 gauge =

Model railroad gauge

Gauge 1
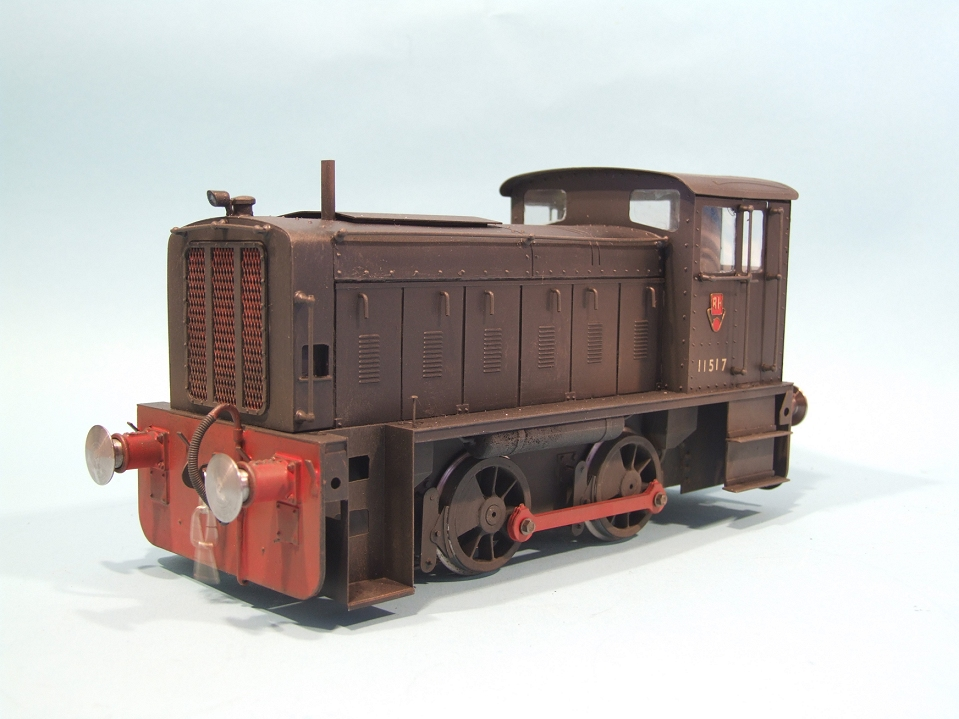
- Gauge 1 model of a Ruston & Hornsby locomotive
- Scale: 3/8 in (9.5 mm) to 1 ft (305 mm)
- Scale ratio: ca. 1:32
- Model gauge: 1.75 in (44.45 mm)
- Prototype gauge: 4 ft 8 1/2 in (1,435 mm) standard gauge

1 gauge, gauge 1, or gauge one is a model railway and toy train standard that was popular in the early 20th century, particularly with European manufacturers. Its track measures 1.75 in (44.45 mm), making it larger than 0 gauge but slightly smaller than wide gauge, which came to be the dominant U.S. standard during the 1920s.

Gauge one was standardised, according to Model Railways and Locomotive magazine of August 1909, at 1.75 in (44.45 mm). An exact 1:32 scale would yield 1.766 in (44.85 mm) for standard gauge prototype. The distance between the wheel tyres was set at 1 17/32 in (38.894 mm) and between the centre of the track 48 mm (no inch equivalent suggesting it was metric users' requirement only). The wheel width was set at 19/64 in (7.541 mm).

Definitions using gauge, rather than scale, were more common in the early days with the four gauges for which standards were adopted being No. 0 (commonly called O gauge currently), No. 1, No. 2 and No. 3.

== History ==
Gauge 1 or 1 gauge was initially as popular in the United States as in the UK.

During World War I, 1 gauge lost popularity in the U.S. as the war dramatically decreased foreign imports, allowing the U.S. wide gauge standard to gain traction.

After World War I ended in 1918, most surviving U.S. manufacturers switched to wide gauge. In the UK and the rest of the world, 1 gauge also declined, although more slowly.

By the 1940s, 1 gauge had practically disappeared worldwide.

In the 1950s and 1960s, 1 gauge experienced a renaissance, first in the UK, and then elsewhere. This was helped by 1 gauge being the same size as the modern G scale, a popular standard for outdoor model railways.

== Scale ==
Although vintage 1 gauge trains use the same track standard as modern G scale, scale modeling was not a primary design consideration in 1 gauge's heyday, so the actual size and scale of the locomotives and cars (UK, wagons) varied.

Generally, 1 gauge equipment works out to approximately 1:32 scale (roughly 10 mm = 1 foot). G scale at 1:22.5 means the 1 gauge track represents 1,000 mm (3 ft 3 3/8 in) metre gauge track in 1:22.5.

Railways corresponding to a 1:22.5 ratio are to be found in, among other places, Switzerland, the source of inspiration for many commercial G gauge models.

== Live steam ==
Due to the size of the locomotives, it is possible for them to be powered with live steam, which to many is a large advantage, inasmuch as they are cheaper than traditional live steam garden railways. These are usually fired by gas or methylated spirit, which are both very popular.

Another form, which is becoming popular, is coal, which gives the user the smell that only steam locomotives carry.

== Manufacturers ==
Both the US and the UK have many producers of gauge one products.

Accucraft Trains in California, The Gauge One Model Railway Company in Britain, ALD Models in the UK (builders of diesel locomotives and wagons), and Aster Hobbies Ltd in Japan produce gauge 1 items, mostly coal, methylated spirits, and butane fired.

Wrightway Rolling Stock produce a range of quality coaches for British outline gauge one railways and a range of cars for North American and European outline railways. They can supply from their range or custom build. Some of the range is available in 10 mm scale.

=== Märklin (Germany) ===
Märklin, in Germany, has produced several different lines of trains that can be considered 1 gauge.

In the late 1800s, Märklin's first production took place, with a line of "tinplate" type trains. This line was later discontinued in favor of their more popular 0 gauge trains.

In the late 1960s, Märklin re-entered the large scale market with a modest range of 1 gauge trains. Based upon one drive mechanism made of metal, Märklin produced both a German Class 80 0-6-0T steam locomotive in two different liveries and a 0-Co-0 diesel based upon a Henschel design. This early range included two-axle passenger cars, two-axle box cars and tank cars, all made of plastic. The tank cars could hold liquids, and the box car and passenger car had operating doors. This range continued in production for a number of years, but was gradually replaced with more accurate locomotives and larger cars. The range expanded to include a Class 38 4-6-0, a Class 78 4-6-4T and a Class 212 Bo-Bo diesel.

In the late 1980s, the Märklin 1 gauge line included a large number of freight car designs in different liveries and a range of three axle passenger cars. The earlier passenger cars and box cars were retained, while the tank cars were discontinued.

In the early 2000s, Märklin added a second line of gauge one trains under the brand name "Maxi". These trains were made of stamped metal and were more toylike in appearance in comparison to their scale version of 1 gauge trains. The Maxi line was intended to compete against the more popular LGB product line, which also operates on 45 mm gauged track, but is scaled to IIm standards. As the Maxi line matured, the toylike shiny appearance gradually gave way to matte finishes. This was in response to European market requests, while the toylike appearance was considered to be more popular in the North American market.

In later years, the Maxi product line was gradually folded into the conventional Märklin 1 gauge product line, with the mark "Maxi" disappearing around 2008. One of the last locomotives marketed under the "Maxi" brand was a Class V60, which had a stamped metal frame and cast metal superstructure. This locomotive is considered to be the end of the Maxi line. The 1 gauge product line continues in production, super-detailed and more expensive than the Maxi line.

== In popular culture ==
This is the scale and gauge that was used for the model locomotives and rolling stock in series 1 to 12 of Thomas & Friends, before switching to CGI animation.

== See also ==
- Bekonscot Model Village
- G scale
- Garden railway
- Hara Model Railway Museum, a museum in Yokohama, Japan, with a 310 sq. metre 1 gauge layout
- Rail transport modelling scales
