= MOROP =

MOROP is a European association that federates national associations of railroad and model railroad enthusiasts.

MOROP was founded in Genoa, Italy by Italo Briano in 1954, and now has its headquarters in Bern, Switzerland. In 2006, MOROP federated 22 national associations from 17 European countries, with a total of more than 30,000 members. The term "MOROP" is a portmanteau derived from "MOdellbahn" (German for "model railway") and EuROPe.

The most important activity of MOROP is to define and maintain the Normen Europäischer Modellbahnen (NEM) ("European Standards for Railway Modelling") standards for model railroads. Since 1994, close ties have been established with the National Model Railroad Association (NMRA) which defines model railroad standards for the United States. For example, the NEM standards for Digital Command Control (DCC) have been defined by working with the NMRA.

The NEM standards and other official documents of MOROP are published in French and German. Some NEM standards have been translated into English, but these translations are not currently normative.

MOROP holds annual public conventions usually held in September, in changing European locations.
