= National Model Railroad Association =

American non-profit organization

- Formation: 1935
- Type: Model Railroading
- Headquarters: Soddy Daisy, Tennessee, United States
- Location: 8414 Gulf View Drive Soddy Daisy, TN 37384
- Members: 18,000+
- President: Gordy Robinson MMR (August 2021- )
- Key people: Jenny Hendricks, Chief Administrative Officer
- Staff: 4
- Website: http://www.nmra.org

The National Model Railroad Association (NMRA) is an American non-profit organization for those involved in the hobby or business of model railroading. It was founded in the United States in 1935, and is also active in Canada, Australia, the United Kingdom, and the Netherlands. It was previously headquartered in Indianapolis, Indiana, and was based in Chattanooga, Tennessee next to the Tennessee Valley Railroad Museum (TVRM) from 1982 to 2013 and has since relocated to Soddy Daisy.

== General ==
The classifications listed below are from the A.A.R. Individual roads may use other designations. Illustrations show a typical member of the class detailed underneath the following a class description indicates a rare or obsolete type.

== Industry involvement ==
The best-known activity of the NMRA is the defining of standards, and advisory documents known as Recommended Practices (RP), for model railroad equipment in North America. Many standards defined by the NMRA are widely followed by the industry and modellers, including their H0 scale track and wheel standards (S-3, S-4) and related RPs (RP2, 8, 10-15, and 25) and their Digital Command Control (DCC) standard set (S-9.1, S-9.2, and RP9.1.1 through RP9.3.2).

The RP25 wheel design in particular has been critical in ensuring the reliability and interoperability of US-prototype model railroad equipment, since practically every manufacturer of such equipment uses wheels conforming to the RP. This is in marked contrast to the British market, in which there is no accepted standard among manufacturers.

In Europe, the Normen Europäischer Modellbahnen (NEM) has the same role, and although there is fairly close cooperation between the two organisations the standards differ in some aspects. At times this results in some models not working as intended on layouts that mix European and American rolling stock and trackwork.

== Education and acknowledgement ==
The NMRA considers the education of model railroaders and the encouraging of learning and improving modelers' skills to be part of its mission. The NMRA runs an achievement program to encourage these skills, and runs modeling contests. Most notably these include the Master Model Railroader certification program and the Golden Spike award. Both programs involve the demonstration and/or judging of proficiency in one or more model railroading skill areas. These areas include Railroad Equipment, Railroad Setting, Railroad Construction & Operation and also Service to the Hobby & NMRA Member. A full explanation of each program along with applications can be found on the NMRA website.

== Community involvement ==
Promotion of the model railroading hobby is also part of the NMRA's purpose. Of note, the organization provides indirect assistance to the Boy Scouts of America's Railroading Merit badge program by encouraging members (through a hierarchy of National and Regional volunteer Boy Scout Coordinators) to become Railroading Merit Badge Counselors.

== Archives ==
The NMRA is home of the A.C. Kalmbach Memorial Library, which houses model and prototype railroad books, periodicals, photos, videos, and reference materials, and was designated as the official railroad library of the state of Tennessee in 2004. In 2013 the NMRA started the process of moving the library to the California State Railroad Museum. The library was adjacent to the Norfolk Southern Railway Georgia Division and the Tennessee Valley Railroad Museum. It is named for Al C. Kalmbach, founder of Kalmbach Publishing, whose original magazines are Model Railroader and Trains.

== See also ==
- Rail transport modelling scales
- List of rail transport modelling scale standards
