= Normen Europäischer Modellbahnen =

German: Normen Europäischer Modellbahnen (French: Normes Européennes de Modélisme ferroviaires, literally European Standards for Model Railways, known in the UK as Normal European Modelling Standards (NEM Standards)) are standards for model railroads, issued by the MOROP.

== Standards ==
The NEM standards are defined and maintained by the Technical Commission of the MOROP in collaboration with model railroad manufacturers.

The NEM standards define the model railroad scales and guide manufacturers in creating compatible products and assist modellers in constructing model railroad layouts that operate reliably. The standards cover areas like suggested grades, turnout radii, wheel profiles, coupling designs and Digital Command Control (DCC) and are mostly scale specific. A fundamental principle in NEM standards are compromises in the exact scale reduction ratio in order to favour operational reliability of model railroad systems. An example for this is wheel flanges which tend to be proportionally wider in smaller scales to ensure reliable operation.

The NEM standards cover areas similar to the standards and recommended practices defined by the National Model Railroad Association (NMRA) in the United States, but the two standards are not universally interchangeable. In recent years, MOROP and NMRA have been working more closely together to establish common standards for developments such as DCC. European model railroad manufacturers generally follow the NEM standards, while North American manufacturers generally follow NMRA standards.

== See also ==
- List of rail transport modelling scale standards
- Rail transport modelling scales
