= Rail transport modelling =

Modelling trains hobby

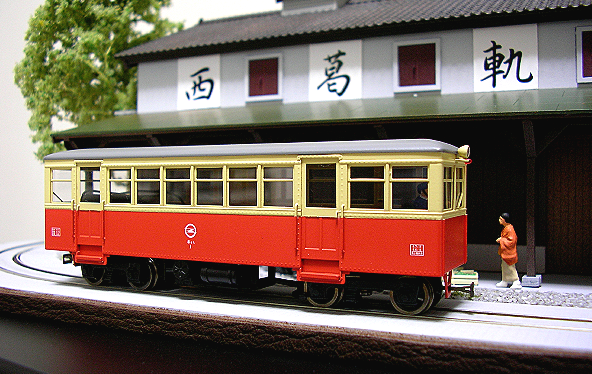
A Japanese H0e scale model railroad

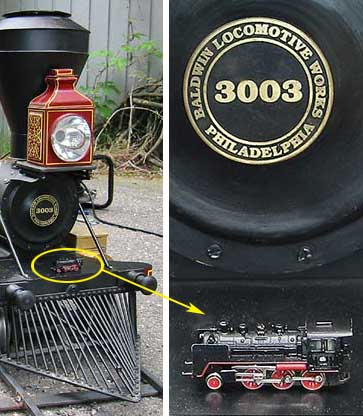
One of the smallest (Z scale, 1:220) placed on the buffer bar of one of the larger (live steam, 1:8) model locomotives

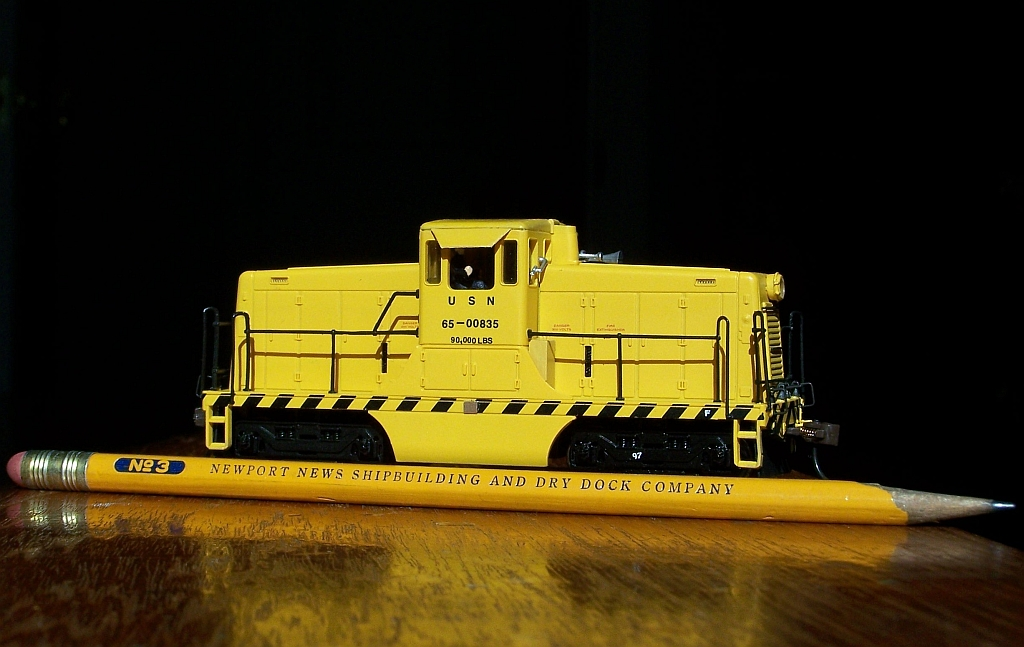
HO scale (1:87) model of a North American center cab switcher shown with a pencil for scale

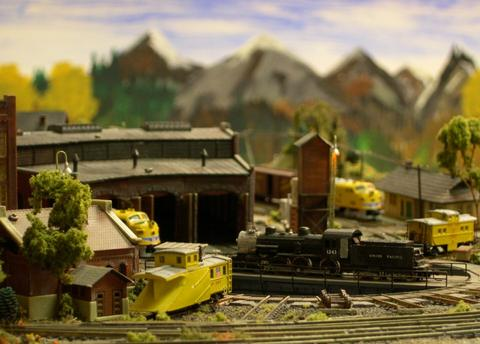
Z scale (1:220) scene of a 2-6-0 steam locomotive being turned. A scratch-built Russell snow plow is parked on a stub (Val Ease Central Railroad).

Railway modelling (British English) or model railroading (American and Canadian English) is a hobby in which rail transport systems are modelled at a reduced scale.

The earliest model railways were the carpet railways in the 1840s. The first documented model railway was the Railway of the Prince Imperial (French: Chemin de fer du Prince Impérial), built in 1859 by Emperor Napoleon III for his then three-year-old son, also Napoleon, in the grounds of the Château de Saint-Cloud in Paris. It was powered by clockwork and ran in a figure-of-eight.

The world's oldest working model railway is a model designed to train signalmen on the Lancashire and Yorkshire Railway. It is located in the National Railway Museum, in York, England, and dates back to 1912; it remained in use until 1995. The model was built as a training exercise by apprentices of the company's Horwich Works and supplied with rolling stock by Bassett-Lowke.

== General description ==
Bekonscot in Buckinghamshire is the oldest model village and includes a model railway, dating from the 1930s. The world's largest model railroad is the Miniatur Wunderland in Hamburg, Germany in H0 scale. The largest live steam layout, with 25 miles (40 km) of track is Train Mountain in Chiloquin, Oregon, U.S. Operations form an important aspect of rail transport modelling with many layouts being dedicated to emulating the operational aspects of a working railway. These layouts can become extremely complex with multiple routes, movement patterns and timetabled operation. The British outline model railway of Banbury Connections in New South Wales, Australia, is one of the world's most complicated model railways.

Model railroad clubs exist where enthusiasts meet. The Tech Model Railroad Club (TMRC) at MIT in the 1950s pioneered automatic control of track-switching by using telephone relays.

A 242A1 locomotive and standard gauge track at some model railway scales

The largest common scale is 1:8, with 1:4 sometimes used for park rides. G scale (Garden, 1:24 scale) is most popular for backyard modelling. It is easier to fit a G scale model into a garden and keep scenery proportional to the trains. Gauge 1 and Gauge 3 are also popular for gardens. O, S, HO, and N scale are more often used indoors.

In 1938, Hornby, a manufacturer of 'O' scale model trains in the UK, launched a range of 'OO' scale electric trains (Hornby Dublo) with 1/76 scale rolling stock using 1/87 scale 16.5 mm wide track with a third centre rail. The power supply was 12 V DC and the track was equipped with an electrically insulated central rail and two non-insulated running rails. In 1959 Hornby abandoned its three-rail track in favour of a two-rail track for its 'OO' scale electric trains.

DC motors with more powerful magnets began to be used for model trains in the 1950s.

Engines powered by live steam are often built in large outdoor gauges of 5 inches (130 mm) and 7 1/2 inches (190 mm), are also available in Gauge 1, G scale, 16 mm scale and can be found in O and OO/HO. Hornby Railways produce live steam locomotives in OO, based on designs first arrived at by an amateur modeller. Other modellers have built live steam models in HO/OO, OO9 and N, and there is one in Z in Australia.

== Model railway manufacturers ==
Model railways

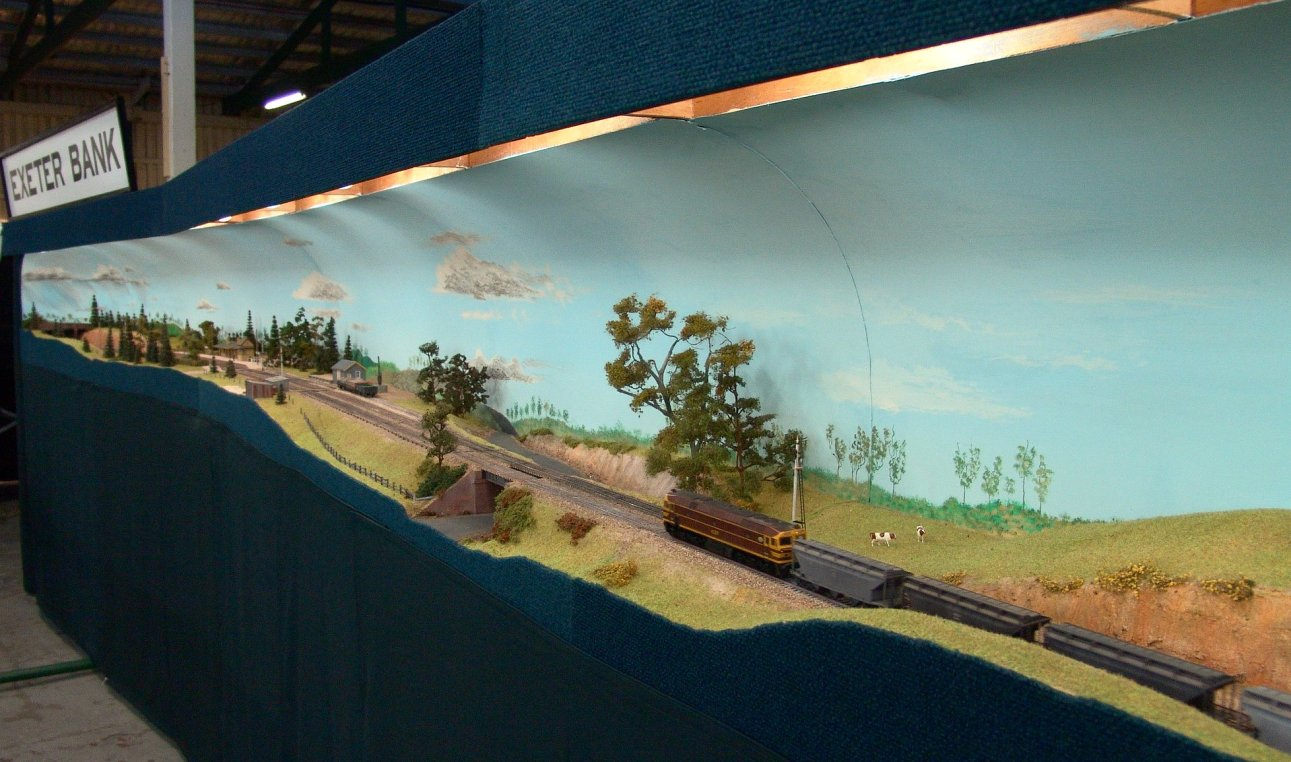
Exeter Bank: An HO-scale Australian model railway

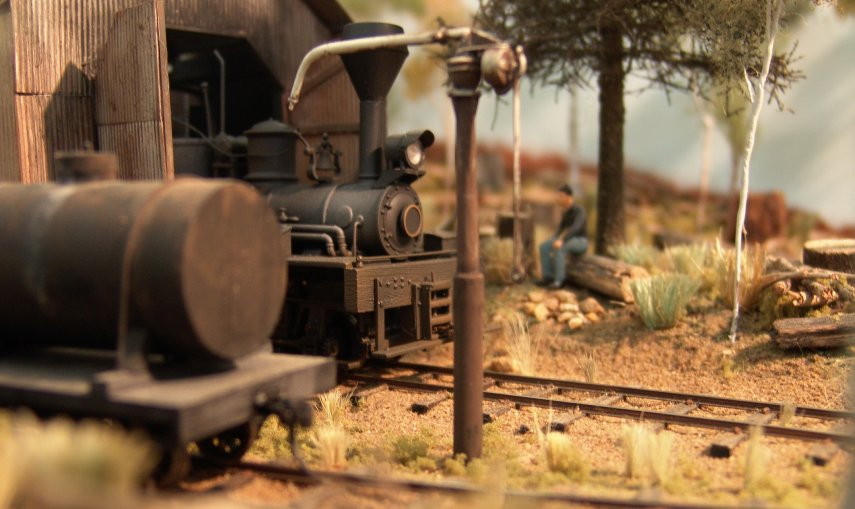
An O-scale Australian model railway

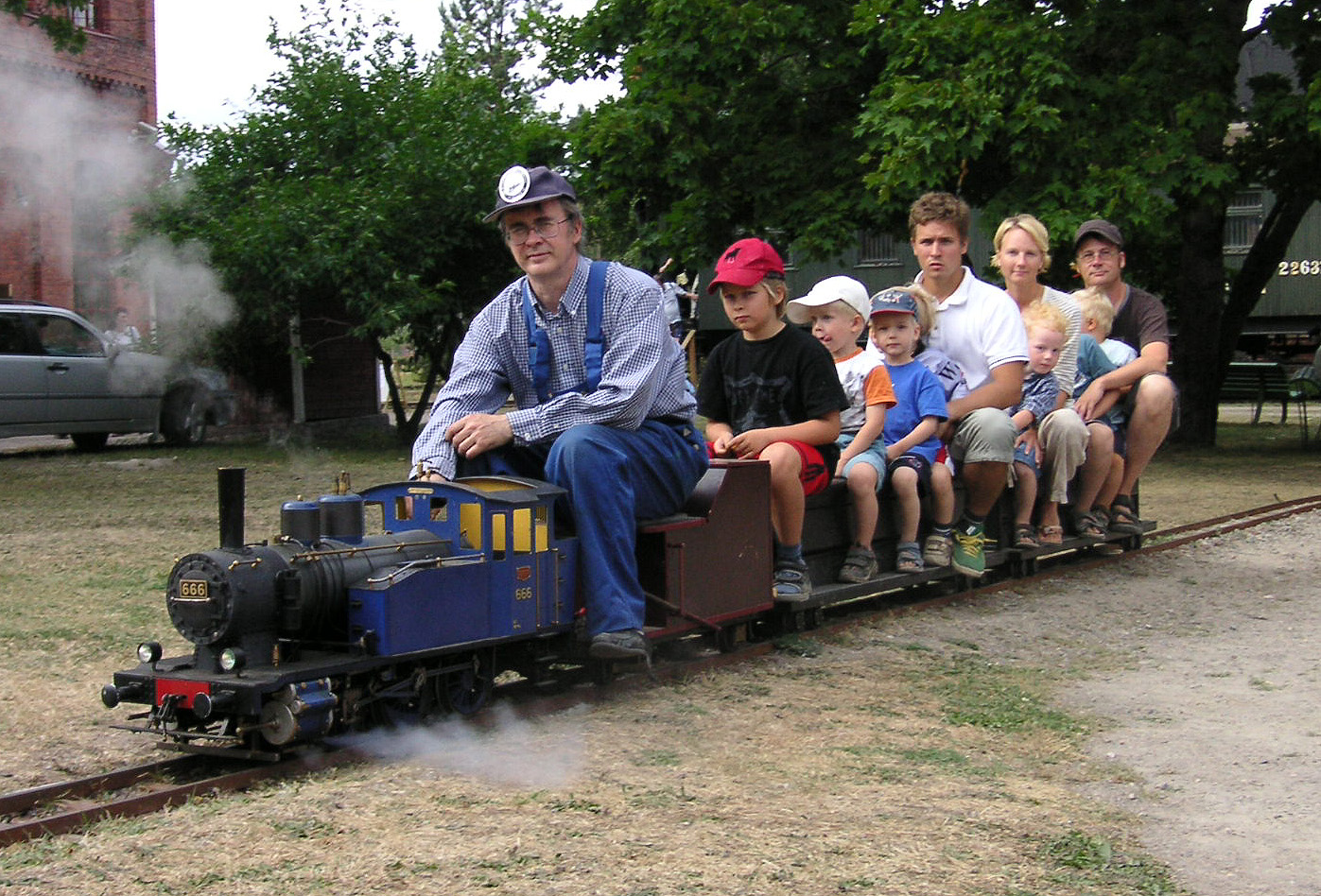
A propane-fired 1:8 scale live steam train running on the Finnish Railway Museum's 7.25-inch (18.4 cm) gauge track

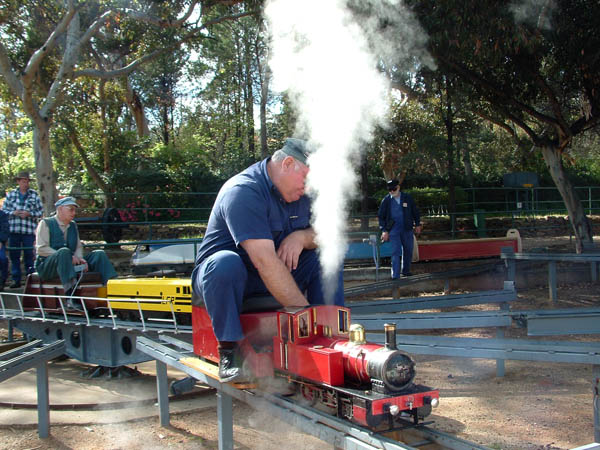
A small 5-inch (13 cm) gauge live steam locomotive at the Wagga Wagga Society of Model Engineers' miniature railway, Willans Hill, Wagga Wagga, New South Wales, Australia

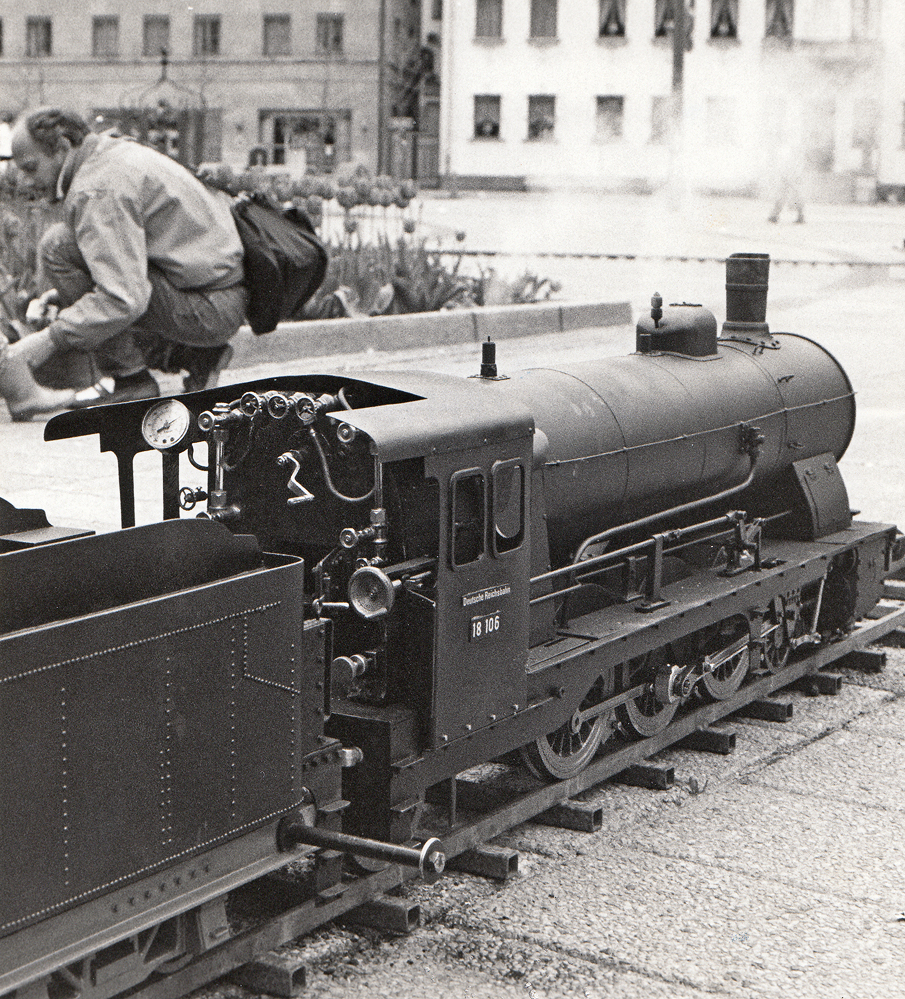
1:8 Live Steam Malmö 1987

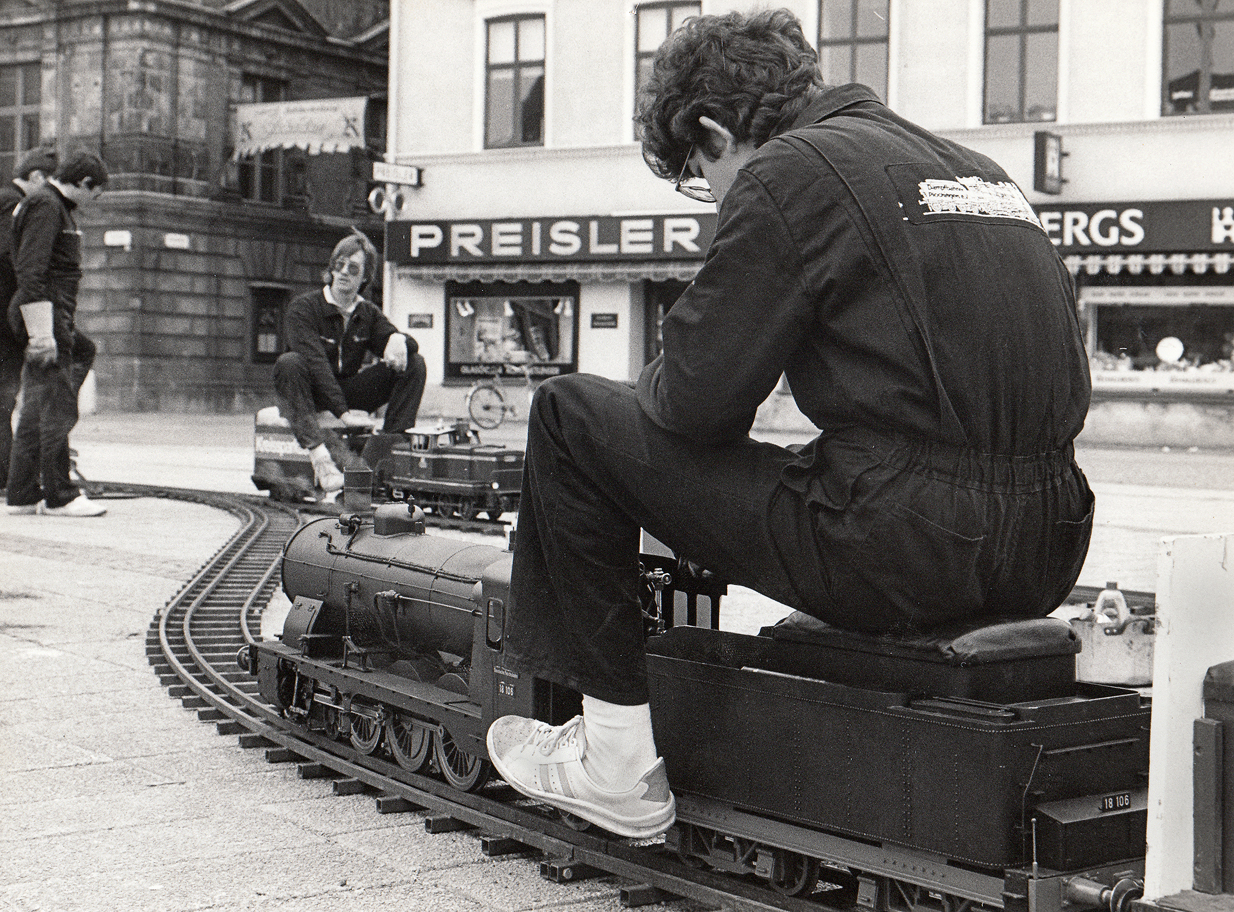
1:8 Live Steam Malmö 1987

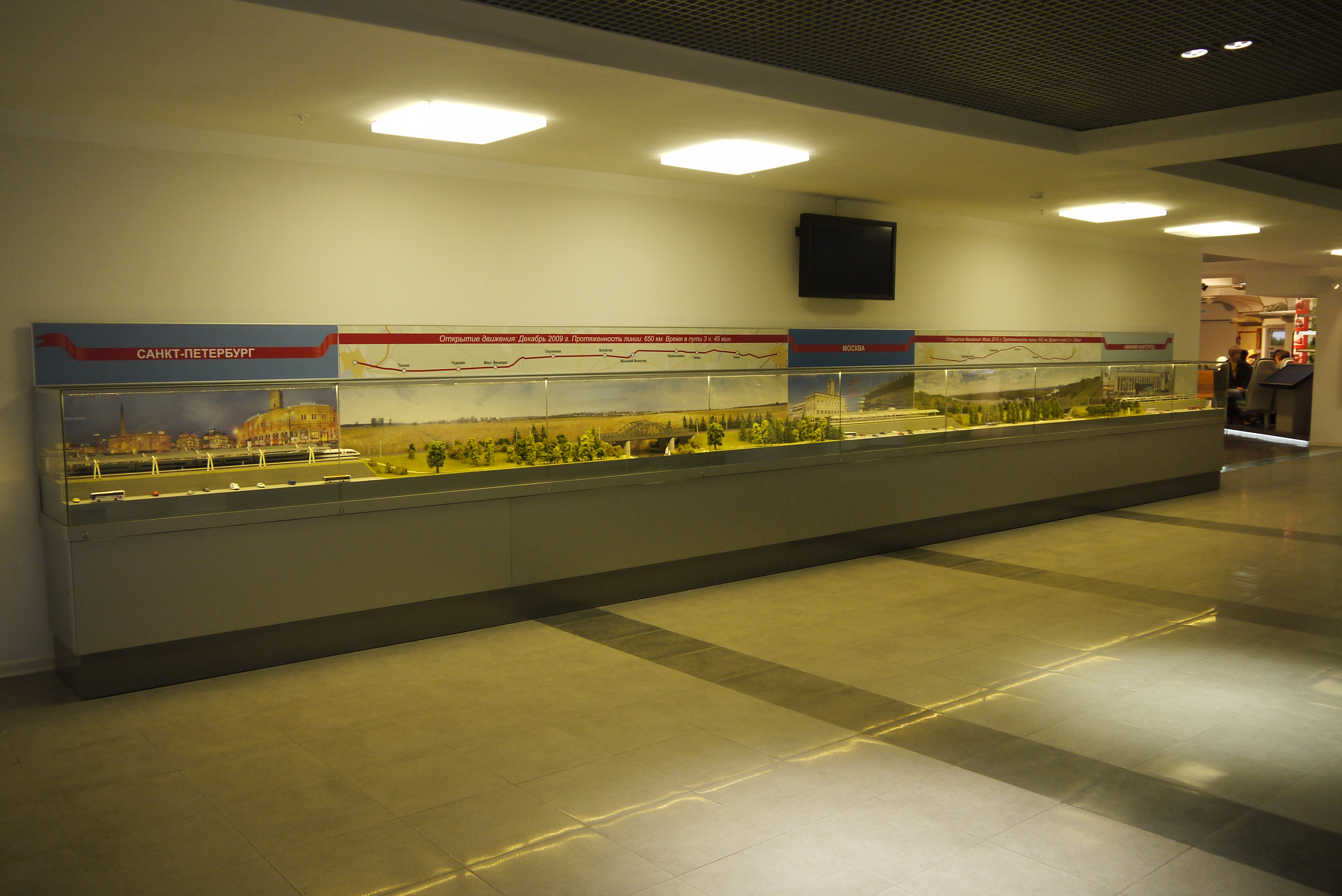
HO gauge Model Railway featuring the Sapsan train on the Moscow – Saint Petersburg Railway and Moscow to Nizhny Novgorod Railway in the Museum of the Moscow Railway, Moscow

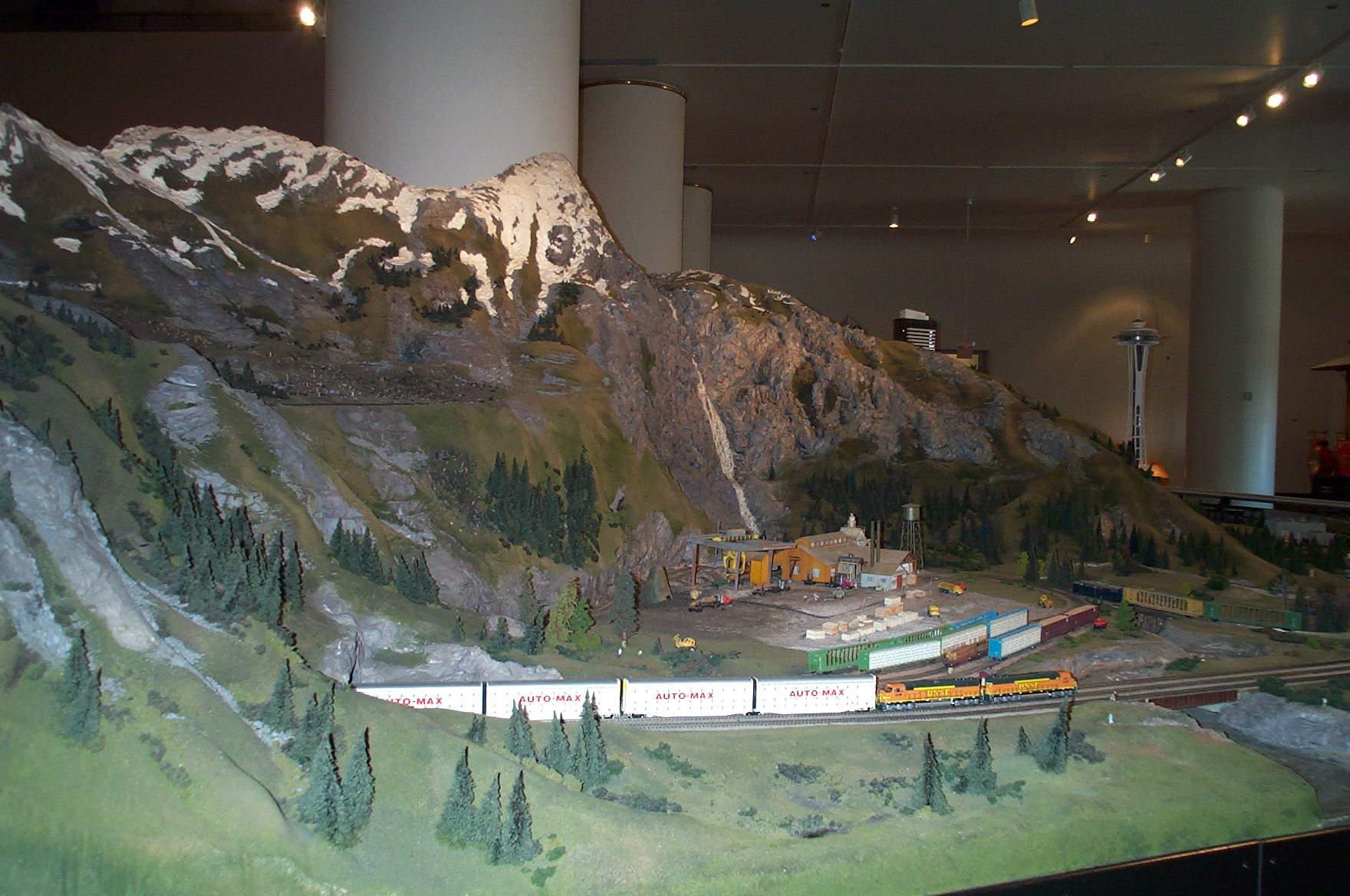
Model train display at Chicago's Museum of Science and Industry

== Layout standards organizations ==
Several organizations exist to set standardizations for connectibility between individual layout sections (commonly called "modules").

- ausTRAK,
- FREMO
- Free-mo
- MOROP
- NEM
- NMRA
- N-orma
- oNeTRAK
- Sipping and Switching Society of NC
- sTTandard
- T-TRAK
- Z-Bend Track

== See also ==
- Brass model
- Densha otaku
- Great American Train Show
- Lego train
- List of model railroad clubs
- Model airport
- Plasticville
- Rail transport modelling scales
- Rail transport modelling standards
- Railfan
- Railwayana
- Scale model
- Standard gauge in Model railways
- Train game

Displays and famous layouts

- Carnegie Science Center's Miniature Railroad & Village in Pittsburgh
- Clemenceau Heritage Museum, elaborate model railroad display depicts the seven railroads that operated in the Upper Verde Valley of Arizona, 1895–1953
- Gorre & Daphetid
- The Great Train Story exhibit at Museum of Science and Industry (Chicago)
- The Hara Model Railway Museum in Yokohama, Japan
- Miniatur Wunderland in Hamburg
- National Toy Train Museum
- Northlandz
- San Diego Model Railroad Museum
- The Toy Train Depot – A museum dedicated to the history of scale model railroading in Alamogordo, New Mexico
- Virginian and Ohio
- Výtopna

Groups dedicated to railway modelling

- Historical Model Railway Society (UK)
- National Model Railroad Association (USA)
- Sydney Model Railway Exhibition
