= List of narrow-gauge model railway scales =

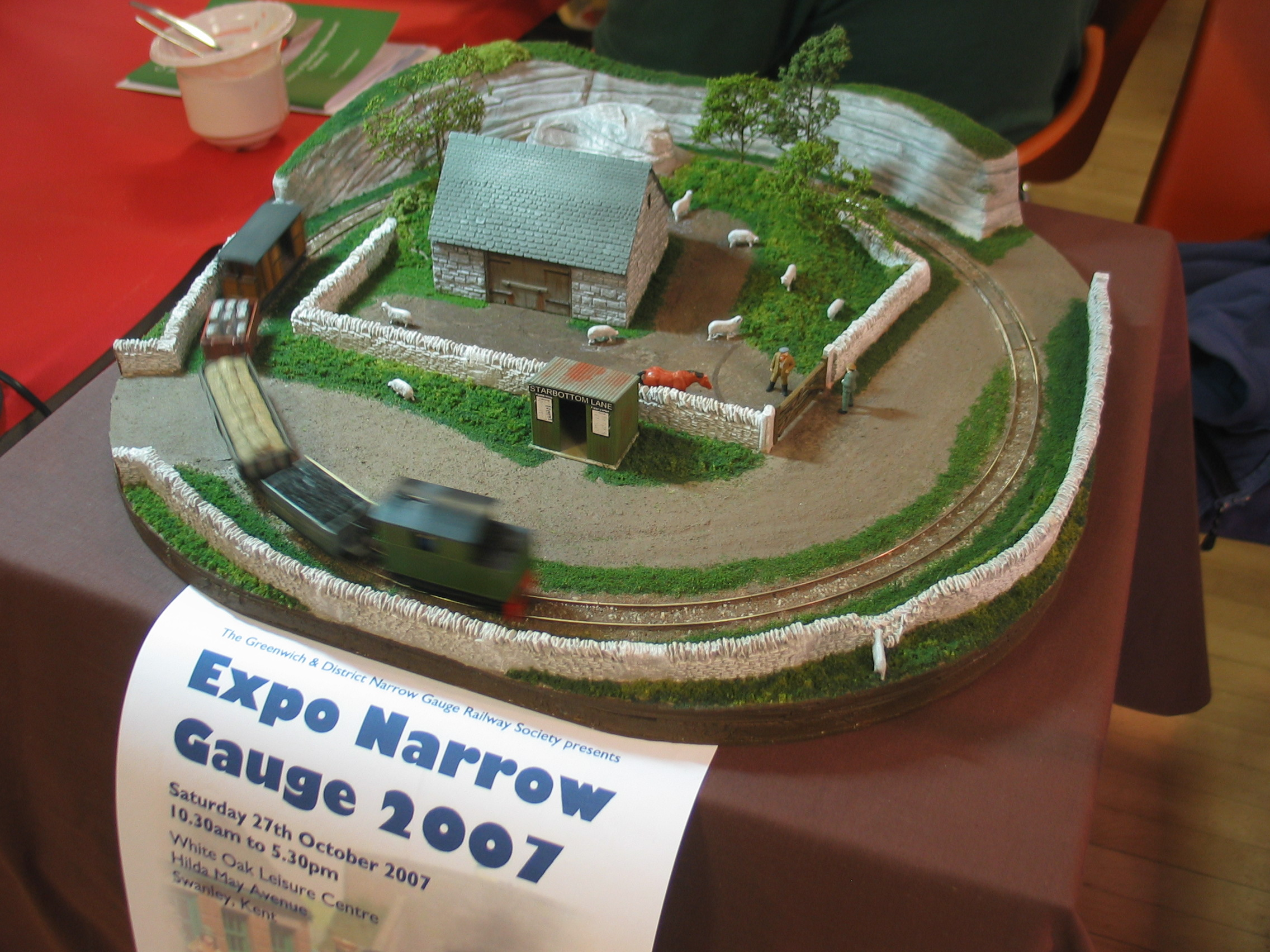
00-9 'pizza' layout, Starbottom Lane by Richard Glover

Railway modelling has long used a variety of scales and gauges to represent its models of real subjects. In most cases, gauge and scale are chosen together, so as to represent Stephenson standard gauge. By choosing a smaller gauge than this for a particular scale, the model represents a narrow-gauge example.

Such gauge and scale combinations are of course used for the deliberate modelling of particular narrow-gauge subjects, where the choice of subject is behind the choice of combination. Narrow-gauge modelling has also become especially popular from the purely modelling aspects: it combines a conveniently visible large scale that is easier to work on, with a narrow model gauge that allows tighter radius curves and so fits layouts into smaller spaces. This has been a particular reason in Europe where, houses being generally smaller than in the US, there is rarely space for 0 gauge and even 00 gauge is restricted in the size of curves.

At times, particularly in the early days before the inertia of popular scales developed, modellers would choose seemingly random scales in order to model a particular prototype and its original gauge whilst using a readily available gauge. As the range of commercial products increases, both for gauges and scales, it is easier to find a combination that is already supported and so there is less need to scratch-build everything.

== Naming ==
Naming of these gauge and scale combinations follows a few broad rules, but not always consistently. Some, such as G gauge and SM32 were defined from the outset as narrow-gauge scales and so have a single component to their name.

=== British ===
Many names, particularly those of British origin, such as O14 and 00-9 combine the name of the scale used with the physical measurement of the gauge, i.e. the 7 mm-to-the-foot scale from standard O gauge with a rail gauge of 14 mm, giving a precise representation of 2 ft (610 mm) prototypes. As it is the scale that controls interoperability between models and also the manufacture of non-railway scenery etc., it is the scale rather than the gauge that takes the primary position in names.

=== European ===
MOROP, the European model railway standards organisation, issues standards documents called NEMs . NEM010 defines the main model railway gauges, including narrow gauges. Unusually, unlike the British model railway trade, this recognised narrow-gauge modelling from the outset. This may be because of Europe's greater prototypical use of the larger narrow gauges for smaller branch lines.

NEM010 defines and names narrow gauges for all the supported scales although it takes a broad approach and groups the prototypes into 'nominal size' ranges or Nenngröße. It defines these prototype gauge ranges as:

Gauge		Description	NEM code letter
1,250–1,700 millimetres	49–67 in	standard gauge	
850–1,250 millimetres	33–49 in	metre gauge	m
650–850 millimetres	26–33 in	narrow gauge	e
400–650 millimetres	16–26 in	industrial	i
400–650 millimetres	16–26 in	Feldbahn	f
300–400 millimetres	12–16 in	park	p

Names are of the form 'H0e gauge', comparable to 00-9, as 'narrow gauge in H0 scale'. Thus the scale and approximate prototype gauge are represented, with the model gauge used (9 mm for H0e gauge; 6.5 mm for H0f gauge) being implied.

The scales used include the general European modelling range of Z, N, TT, H0, 0 and also the large model engineering gauges of I to X, including 3 1/2, 5, 7 1/4 and 10 1/4-inch gauge. As 00 is a particularly British scale, it is not included within this pan-European standard. However the predominantly US imperial-based S scale (1:64) does feature.

=== United States ===
US gauges are named as On30 or Sn3, composed of the scale, 'n' for narrow gauge and the dimensions of the prototype gauge being modelled. These are universally in imperial units rather than metric, but there is no consistency between using inches or feet. Both On42 and On2 are used, but when referring to the prototype gauge, e.g. On30 / On2 1/2, the gauge is usually given in inches.

== Gauge and scale combinations ==
			Gauge																				
			1 gauge		O gauge	Proto:48					P4 Gauge	EM gauge	H0 / 00 gauge			JM gauge aka #13		TT gauge	H0n3	N gauge	Z gauge	ZZ gauge	T gauge
Scale			45 mm	33mm	32 mm	1.177" (circa 29.9mm)	24.5mm	0.875 inches (22.2 mm)	21 mm	0.75 inches (19 mm)	18.83 mm	18.2 mm	16.5 mm	14.3 mm	14 mm	13mm	12.7 mm	12 mm	10.5 mm	9 mm	6.5 mm	4.5 mm	3 mm
SE scale	7/8"	1:13.7	SE (Note: SE or 7/8" – used to model 2 ft. Less commonly used with 32 mm track to represent 18 in (457 mm) minimum gauge.); 2 ft (610 mm)		SE; 18 in (457 mm)																		
16 mm scale		1:19	SM45 (Note: SM32 – 2 ft (610 mm).); 2 ft 9 in (838 mm)		SM32; 2 ft (610 mm)																		
F scale		1:20.3	Fn3; 3 ft (914 mm)		Fn2; 2 ft (610 mm)																		
G scale		1:22.5	IIm G (Note: G scale – Originally developed as 'groß' in Germany by LGB to represent 1,000 mm (3 ft 3 3/8 in). Now widely thought of as 'Garden' gauge.); 1,000 mm (3 ft 3 3/8 in)										Gn15 (Note: Gn15 – using G scale and commonly available 00 running gear to model the 15 in (381 mm) minimum-gauge railways of Sir Arthur Heywood and his successors.); 15 in (381 mm)							Gnine; 8 in (203 mm)			Miniature ride-on
H scale	1/2"	1:24	H 3 ft 6 in (1,067 mm)																				
	3/8"	1:32											3/8n20 20 in (508 mm)										
P34	9mm	1:34			P34 (Note: P34 – 3 ft 6 in (1,067 mm)); 3 ft 6 in (1,067 mm)																		
O scale (Note: UK O gauge uses a scale of 7mm/foot, Europe uses 1:45 and the US 1:48)	7mm	1:43.5					On42 (Note: On42 – 7mm S7 scale used for Richard Chown's Fangfoss, Norwegian 3 ft 6 in (1,067 mm). 1:48 1/4" scale used for Queensland sugar cane railways and US subjects of 3 ft 6 in (1,067 mm)); 3 ft 6 in (1,067 mm)		O21 (Note: O21 – 3 ft (914 mm)); 3 ft (914 mm)				O16.5 (Note: O16.5 – UK 7 mm scale with 00 16.5 mm gauge, used to model gauges between 2 ft (610 mm) and 2 ft 6 in (762 mm).); 2 ft 4 in (711 mm)		O14 (Note: O14 – Finescale modelling of British 2ft gauge using 7 mm O scale and a unique 14 mm gauge.); 2 ft (610 mm)					O9 / On15 (Note: O9 / On15 – UK 7mm scale on a 9 mm gauge to model 15 in (381 mm) minimum gauge and 18 in (457 mm) industrial railways.); 15 in (381 mm)			
O scale		1:45											0e 750 mm (2 ft 5 1/2 in)							0p 400 mm (15 3/4 in)			
O scale	1/4"	1:48						On42; 3 ft 6 in (1,067 mm)		On3 (Note: On3 – Using US O scale (1:48 ratio) with 0.75 in gauge track to represent 3 ft (914 mm). Probably the second most popular US scale for 3 ft (914 mm).); 3 ft (914 mm)			On30 / On2 1/2 (Note: On30 – 1:48 scale with 16.5 mm track to represent 2 ft 6 in (762 mm), in practice anything between 2 ft (610 mm) and 3 ft (914 mm). On2 1/2 is another name for the same standard. Commercial support, particularly from Bachmann, is available.); 2 ft 6 in (762 mm)				On2 (Note: On2 – Precise modelling of USA 2ft gauge using 1:48 O scale and a unique 12.7 mm gauge. This may be considered a Finescale version of On30. There is little to no commercial support for the mechanical aspects of this unique gauge but it is sometimes possible to re-use or re-gauge commercial models for On30.); 2 ft (610 mm)		On20 (Note: On20 – Extremely rare gauge primarily for modeling 20" mining railroads in the USA); 20 in (508 mm)	On18; 18 in (457 mm); Of; 450 mm (17 23/32 in)			
		1:50										Pempoul (Note: Pempoul – Finescale modelling of French metre gauge at 1:50 scale on 18.2 mm Finescale EM gauge. So far only used by Gordon & Maggie Gravett.); 1,000 mm											
	6mm																	Towy Valley Tramway (Note: Towy Valley Tramway – Finescale modelling of 2ftt gauge on 12mm.); 2 ft (610 mm)					
5.5 mm	5.5mm	1:55											5.5 mm (Note: 5.5 mm – Used to represent both 3 ft (914 mm) (on 16.5mm) & 2 ft (610 mm) (on 12mm) gauges. British outline two foot gauge is one of the oldest narrow gauge modelling scales, when the GEM company in 1963 launched white metal kits to represent Welsh slate railways, using readily available TT gauge parts. Three foot gauge in this scale is mostly US and has little in common with the two foot.); 3 ft (914 mm)					5.5 mm 2 ft (610 mm)					
S scale	3/16"	1:64											Sm (Note: Sm – 1:64 metre gauge; Continental European.); European metre gauge Sn3 1/2 (Note: Sn3 1/2 – Using S scale (1:64 ratio) with 16.5 mm H0/00 gauge track to represent 3 ft 6 in (1,067 mm). Popular in Australasia.); 3 ft 6 in (1,067 mm)	Sn3 (Note: Sn3 – Using S scale (1:64 ratio) with 14.3 mm (0.563 in) gauge track to represent 3 ft (914 mm). Limited commercial support.); 3 ft (914 mm)					Sn2; 2 ft (610 mm)	Sn2 (Note: Sn2 – Used rarely in Australia for modelling 2 ft (610 mm)); 2 ft (610 mm)			
00 scale	4mm	1:76.2							Irish broad gauge									00n3 (Note: 00n3 – 1:76 12 mm British, Irish and Manx 3 ft (914 mm).); 3 ft (914 mm)		00-9 (Note: 00-9 – 2 ft 3 in (686 mm) 1:76 9 mm 2 ft 3 in (686 mm) British and British Empire subjects from 2 ft to 2 ft 6 in.); 2 ft 3 in (686 mm)	500 mm (19 3/4 in); 495 mm (19 1/2 in)		
H0 scale	Japanese HO aka #16 aka J	1:80														JM 3 ft 6 in (1,067 mm)				H0e (Note: H0e – 1:87 9 mm 650 to <850 mm; Continental European.) HOn30 / HOn2 1/2 (Note: HOn30 HOn2 1/2 – 1:87 9 mm 2 ft 6 in (762 mm) American.); 750 mm (2 ft 5 1/2 in)			
H0 scale	3.5mm	1:87																H0m (Note: H0m – 1:87 12 mm 850 to <1250 mm; Continental European.); 1,000 mm HOn3 1/2 (Note: HOn3 1/2 – 1:87 12 mm 3 ft 6 in (1,067 mm).); 3 ft 6 in (1,067 mm)	HOn3 (Note: HOn3 – Using HO scale (1:87 ratio) with 10.5 mm gauge track. Historically the most popular of the scale/gauge combinations for modelling 3 ft gauge in the USA.); 3 ft (914 mm)	H0e HOn30 / HOn2 1/2; 750 mm (2 ft 5 1/2 in)	H0f/H0i (Note: H0f (H0i) – 1:87 6.5 mm (Z gauge) 400 to 650 mm; Continental European.); 600 mm (1 ft 11 5/8 in) HOn2 (Note: HOn2 – 1:87 7 millimetres (0.276 in) 2 ft (610 mm) American); 2 ft (610 mm)	H0p	
TT scale	3 mm	1:100																		TTn3 (Note: TTn3 – 3 mm scale on 9 mm gauge to model 3ft prototypes. Some use in Australasia at TTn3 1/2 for their 3 ft 6 in (1,067 mm) lines, and known as NZ120 in New Zealand); 3 ft (914 mm)			
TT scale	3 mm	1:120																		NZ120; 3 ft 6 in (1,067 mm)		TTf/TTi gauge	
N scale	UK N scale	1:148																					
N scale	Japanese N scale	1:150																			Nj gauge		
N scale	2mm	1:152																					
N scale		1:160																			Nm Nn3 (Note: Nn3 or N-6.5 – Using N scale (1:160 ratio ) with Z gauge 6.5 mm track to represent 3ft gauge.)	Ne gauge	
Z scale		1:220																				Zm gauge	
T scale		1:450 (Note: T gauge is a constant 3 mm gauge, although it defines two scale standards: 1:480 for modelling Stephenson gauge and 1:450 for Japanese 3 ft 6 in (1,067 mm).)																					T gauge 3 ft 6 in (1,067 mm)

Standard gauge is shaded

== See also ==
- Rail transport modelling scales
- List of rail transport modelling scale standards
