= 12 mm =

12 mm or 12 mm gauge may refer to:

== Rail transport modelling ==
- TT gauge, 1:120 scale with rails 12 mm apart, representing standard gauge
- HOn3½ gauge, 1:87.1 scale with rails 12 mm apart, representing 3-foot-6-inch gauge
- H0m, 1:87 scale with rails 12 mm apart, representing metre gauge
- 00n3, 1:76 scale with rails 12 mm apart, representing 3-foot gauge
- 5.5 mm scale, 1:55 scale with rails 12 mm apart, representing narrow gauge
- On2 gauge, 1:48 scale with rails 12.7 mm apart, representing narrow gauge

== Firearms ==
- 12 mm caliber
