= HOn3½ gauge =

HOn3½ scale
- Scale: 3.5 mm to 1 ft (305 mm)
- Scale ratio: 1:87
- Model gauge: 12 mm (0.472 in)
- Prototype gauge: 3 ft 6 in (1,067 mm)

HOn3 1/2 gauge represents the modelling of 3 ft 6 in (1,067 mm) gauge railways in HO scale, resulting in a model track gauge of 12 mm (0.472 in) (the same as H0m and TT scale). Trains are operated using direct current or Digital Command Control over realistic-looking two-rail track.

Railways that use the 3 ft 6 in (1,067 mm) gauge can be found in New Zealand, South Africa, Indonesia, Australia, Taiwan, Japan and others.

Manufacturers of Australian outline models in this size include Haskell Models, Wuiske Models, Black Diamond, PGC, Southern Rail and SDS Models. The main focus for Australian narrow gauge modelling has been the large Queensland railway system. More recent releases have included Tasmanian and Western Australian prototypes. In New Zealand, the scale has a few niche manufactures.

CMD models and SARModel produce South African and Zimbabwean (Rhodesia Railways) HOn3 1/2 models.

Most Japanese and Taiwanese HO scale models are made to run on 16.5mm gauge track and are made to 1:80 scale (Tomix, Kato and Tenshodo for Japan being the main brands and Haskell for Taiwan) but some small volume HOn3.5 kits and brass models are made for Japan with Imon being a major supplier.

== Related scales ==
In the same scale standard-gauge trains are modelled on 16.5 mm (0.65 in) gauge track, known as HO scale. Sn3½ is also used to represent 3 ft 6 in (1,067 mm), as the gauge is the same as HO scale. HOm uses the same 12mm gauge track to represent metre-gauge (3ft3.37in) railways. HOn3 uses 10.5 mm (0.413 in) gauge to represent 3 ft (914 mm) gauge railways H0e/HOn30 uses 9 mm (0.354 in) gauge to represent railway with gauges of about 750 millimetres (2 ft 6 in). H0f gauge uses 6.5 mm (0.256 in) to represent 2 ft and 600 mm gauge railways.

== See also ==
- List of narrow-gauge model railway scales
- Rail transport modelling scales
- List of rail transport modelling scale standards
