= 9 mm (disambiguation) =

9 mm or 9×19mm Parabellum is a firearms cartridge.

9 mm or 9mm may also refer to:

- "9mm" (song), David Banner song
- 9 mm caliber, cartridges other than 9×19mm with 9 mm bullets
- 9mm Parabellum Bullet, a Japanese rock band

== Rail transport modelling ==
- N gauge, 1:160 scale, with rails 9 mm apart, representing standard gauge
- British N gauge, 1:148 scale, with rails 9 mm apart, representing standard gauge
- H0e/HOn30 gauge, 1:87.1 scale, with rails 9 mm apart, representing narrow gauge
- OO9, 1:76 scale, with rails 9 mm apart, representing narrow gauge in Britain
- Gnine/IIp gauge, 1:22.5 scale, with rails 9 mm apart, representing minimum/miniature gauge
