= Merv Smith (broadcaster) =

New Zealand radio broadcaster (1933–2018)

Merv Smith QSM
- Born: Mervyn Charles Smith; 11 March 1933; Piopio, New Zealand
- Died: 24 September 2018 (aged 85); Auckland, New Zealand
- Occupation: Broadcaster
- Known for: 1ZB breakfast host

Mervyn Charles Smith QSM (11 March 1933 – 24 September 2018) was a New Zealand radio broadcaster and railway aficionado.

== Early life and family ==
Smith was born in Piopio on 11 March 1933, the son of George Adlow Smith and Adelaide Edith "Nuki" Smith (née Bunting).

== Broadcasting career ==
Described as one of the pillars of New Zealand broadcasting, Smith was breakfast show host on Auckland Radio New Zealand station 1ZB from 1961 until a format change in 1986, when he moved to Radio i. He held the country's top ratings for almost the entirety of his career. Smith was also a regular voice artist, narrating nearly 200 books for the blind, and featuring on commercials on both radio and television.

== Later life and death ==
After retirement, Smith pursued his lifelong passion of railways and railway modelling, opening a model and hobby shop in Auckland. Smith had previously written of his interest in model railways in his 1977 book Little Trains of Thought (Whitcoulls Publishers, Christchurch; co-written with Ches Livingstone), which detailed his creation of a model HOn30-scale layout based on a fictional New Zealand West Coast narrow-gauge line. Smith also built the "North Island Main Trunk" layout in Sn3.5 scale at the Museum of Transport and Technology in Auckland.

Smith was admitted to Auckland Hospital on 21 September 2018, and died there three days later.

== Honours and awards ==
In 1976, Smith received the Benny Award from the Variety Artists Club of New Zealand, the highest honour for a New Zealand entertainer. In the 1985 Queen's Birthday Honours, he was awarded the Queen's Service Medal for community service.
