= 6.5 mm =

6.5mm or 6.5mm gauge may refer to:

== Rail transport modelling ==
- Z gauge, 1:220 scale with rails 6.5 mm apart, representing standard gauge
- Nn3 gauge, 1:160 scale with rails 6.5 mm apart, representing metre/3-foot gauge
- H0f gauge, 1:87 scale with rails 6.5 mm apart, representing narrow gauge

== Firearms ==
=== Pistol cartridges ===
- 6.5mm Bergmann, centerfire cartridge
- 6.5×25mm CBJ, pistol cartridge

=== Rifle cartridges ===
- 6.5mm Grendel (6.5×39mm), cartridge designed for the AR-15
- 6.5mm Creedmoor, centerfire rifle cartridge
- 6.5mm Remington Magnum, belted bottlenecked cartridge
- 6.5×42mm, also known as 6.5 MPC (Multi Purpose Cartridge), centerfire rifle cartridge
- 6.5×47mm Lapua, smokeless powder rimless bottlenecked rifle cartridge
- 6.5×50mmSR Arisaka, Japanese military cartridge
- 6.5×52mm Mannlicher–Carcano, Italian military cartridge
- 6.5×53mmR, Dutch and Romanian military cartridge
- 6.5×54mm Mannlicher–Schönauer, Greek military cartridge
- 6.5×55mm, Swedish-Norwegian military cartridge
- 6.5×68mm, rebated rim bottlenecked centerfire rifle cartridge
- 6.5-284 Norma, wildcat cartridge
