= SE scale =

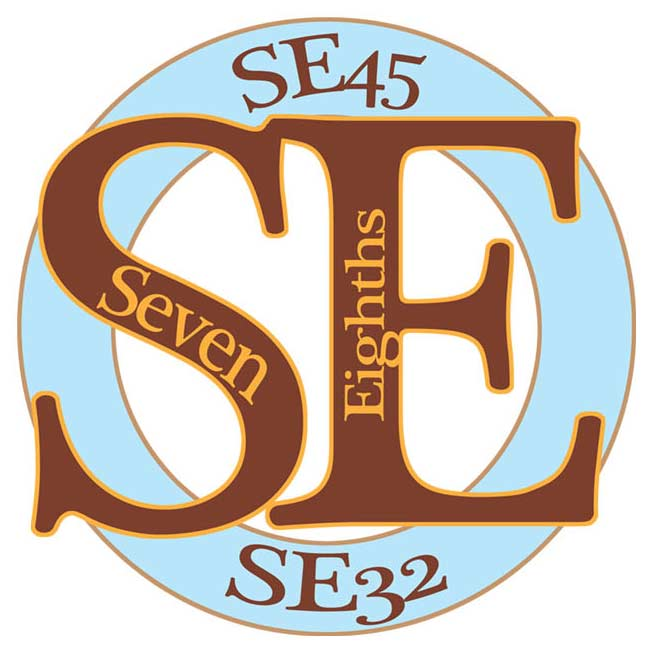
- SE scale logo
- Scale: 7/8 in to 1 ft
- Scale ratio: 1:13.7
- Model gauge: 45 mm (1.772 in) and 32 mm (1.26 in)
- Prototype gauge: Narrow-gauge railway, 2 ft (610 mm); Minimum-gauge railway, 18 in (457 mm)

SE scale is a designation used by some modellers to describe miniature (model) trains which run on either Gauge 1 (45 mm or 1.772 in) track or O gauge (32 mm or 1.26 in) track. In the SE scale, 7/8 of an inch equals one foot, which is a ratio of 1:13.7. On 45 mm (1.772 in) gauge track this represents real life narrow-gauge railways that are 2 ft (610 mm) gauge, while on 32 mm (1.26 in) gauge track this represents 18 in (457 mm) railways.

Modelling on a scale where 7/8 inch = 1 foot is relatively new (within the last 20 years) and, as a result, the majority of the modellers build from scratch.

== See also ==
- Rail transport modelling scales
