= 5.5 mm scale =

Model railway scale

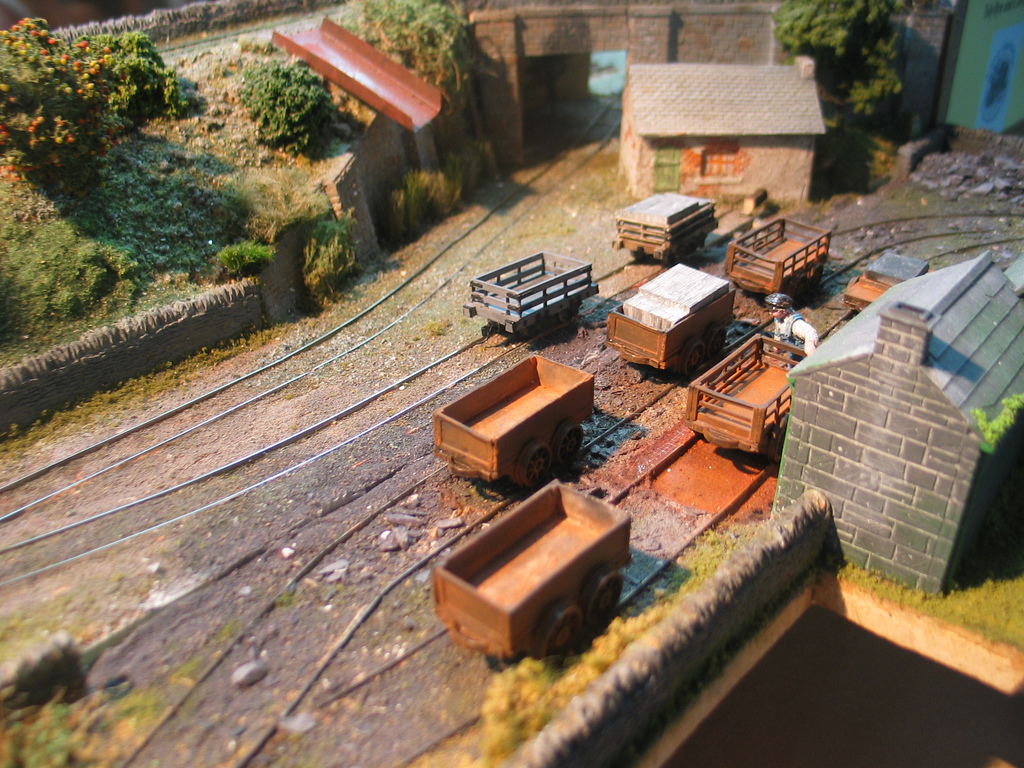
- A scene from Francis Stapleton's 5.5mm layout, Ty Bach
- Scale: 5.5 mm to 1ft
- Scale ratio: 1:55
- Model gauge: 16.5 mm (0.65 in), 12 mm (0.472 in)
- Prototype gauge: 3 ft (914 mm), 2 ft (610 mm)-2 ft 3 in (686 mm)

5.5 mm to 1 foot scale (1:55.4 or 1:55) is used for modelling narrow gauge railways. 12 mm (0.472 in) gauge track is used to represent 2 ft (610 mm) to 2 ft 3 in (686 mm) gauge prototypes. 16.5 mm (0.65 in) gauge track is used to represent 3 ft (914 mm) gauge prototypes. Very narrow industrial or rural lines can be represented by N-gauge (9 mm gauge) on OO9-track do give 18 in (457 mm). These 5.5mm could be called "5.5-ind".

== History ==
5.5mm scale narrow gauge model railways were developed by GEM in 1963, using 12 mm (0.472 in) gauge track, which was the smallest commercially available gauge at the time (TT gauge). GEM produced kits for locomotives and rolling stock from the Ffestiniog and Talyllyn railways. Following the development of N gauge, using 9 mm (0.354 in) gauge track, the popularity of 5.5 mm scale declined as modellers adopted OO9 which could combine N gauge track and mechanisms with the widely supported 4 mm scale.

However 5.5mm scale remained in use and, following an article on the Gwynant Valley Railway by Malcolm Savage in Railway Modeller, October 1984, the 5.5mm Association was formed. The tooling for the GEM kits was purchased by Malcolm Savage in 1996 and he reintroduced and upgraded the range. Following Malcolm's death in 2018 the tooling was purchased by 55th Studios. Worsley Works has also produced "scratch aids" for the scale. More recently, 3D printing techniques have expanded the range of available models even further, while in the USA there's a quietly flourishing 3' gauge modelling fraternity, using OO track and mechanisms.

There are many other sources of modelling aids for 5.5 mm scale. Siku's Super Series of vehicles are to 1/55 scale, while in the military modelling and wargaming world, 28mm scale (the height of a 6' tall figure) is a close match. Historical and contemporary figures, buildings and accessories are all readily available from a variety of manufacturers.

== See also ==
- List of narrow-gauge model railway scales
