= Egger-bahn =

German company

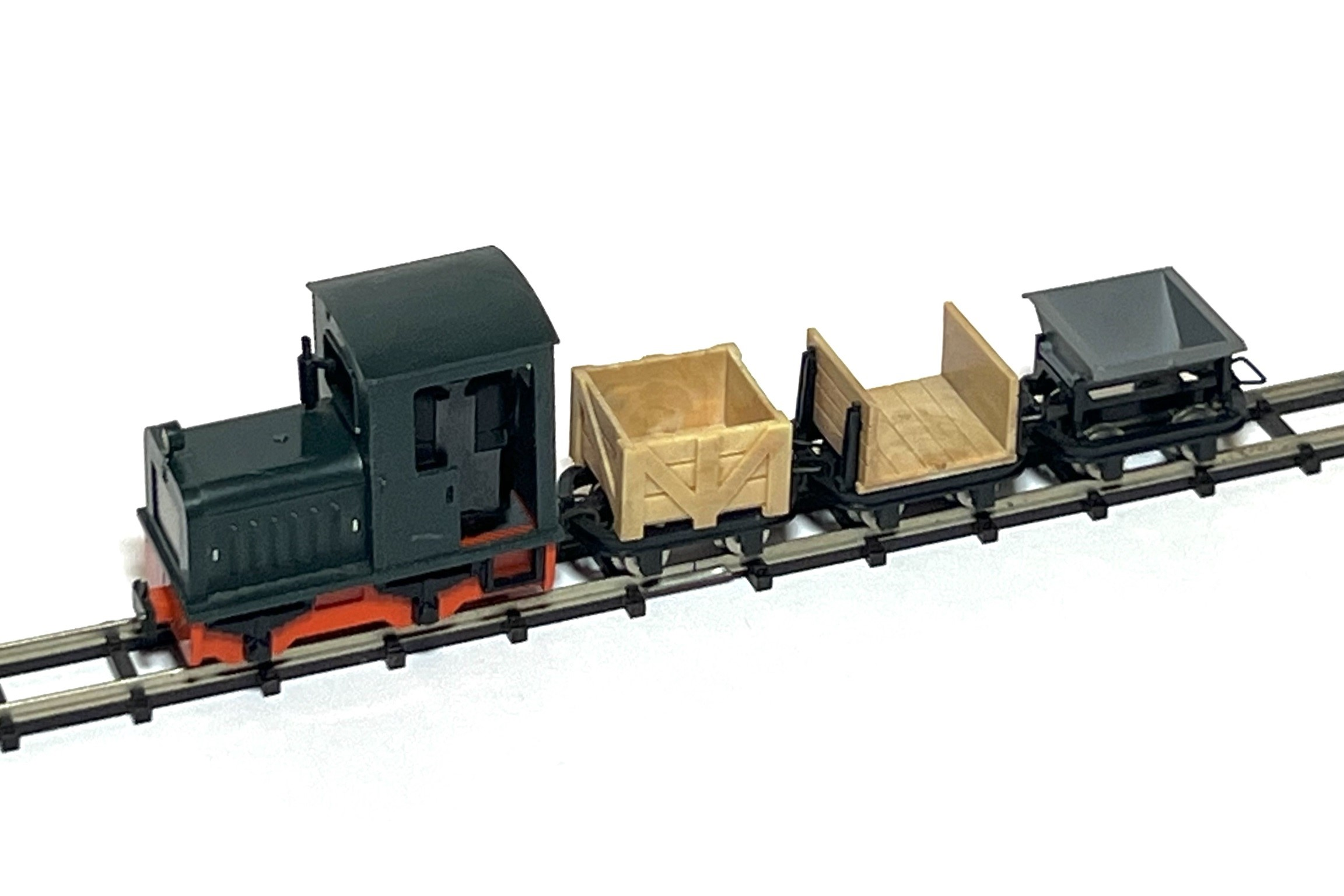
Original Egger-Bahn diesel locomotive in H0e gauge, short version, and wagons

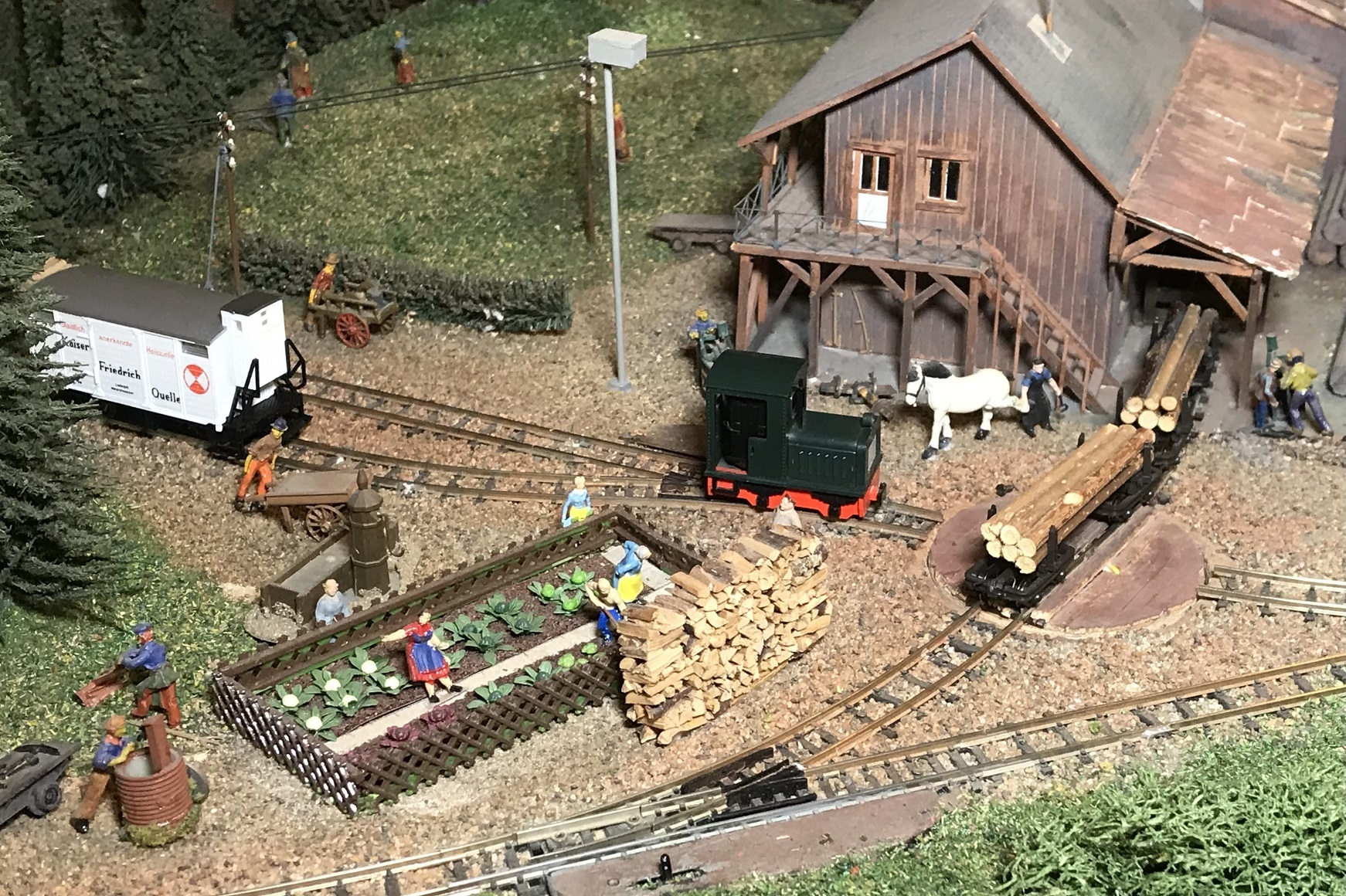
Left and in center of the picture, Egger-Bahn vehicles on a private H0e gauge layout in Bern

Egger-Bahn was a German model railway manufacturer. The company produced the first H0e (HO (1:87) scale narrow gauge rolling stock using N gauge track) models, and established HOe as a viable model railway standard. The firm was founded in 1963 by three brothers. One of them, a performer, soon left the firm. Theodor Egger, technician, and Jonathan Egger, salesman, continued. The models first appeared at the 1963 Nuremberg Toy Fair.

The scale/gauge combination represented 600–750 mm gauge lines, but could reasonably depict several similar narrow gauge sizes. 009 is a similar concept, used mainly for modelling UK-based prototypes, again on N gauge track, but to the OO scale of 4 mm to 1 ft (1:76.2). Egger was the first to produce H0e ready-to-run models, and they were a great success. In 1964 the range was expanded, including a steam locomotive. Models from Egger-Bahn were often used in presentation layouts. For instance Faller used them in their magazine, as the smaller models better fit Faller's scale of 1:100. In the USA Egger-Bahn was marketed by AHM (as H0n30 scale) together with Roco Peetzy models under the name of "Minitrains".

A combination of market demands and technological innovation (such as Magna-Kraft) led to the company having to revise molds and create new models at a rapid pace. Later on, it was decided to simplify models in an attempt to better keep up with demand, a move which was unpopular with consumers. The company, in an effort to gain more financial backing, partnered with Constantin Film to produce "western" themed trains to go with the company's Old Shatterhand and Winnetou films, however their lack of realism (for modellers) and fragility (for children) lead to poor sales. In the end the firm was broken up in 1967 and Jouef later acquired the toolings and produced the models for a short time, ending in the early 1970s.

In 1983 the old molds were rediscovered in storage, and Jouef attempted to market the models within France, to little success, leading to the line to cease production again by the early 1990s.
The company name registration was not renewed and now is possessed by private owners including Theodor Egger.

Apart from the narrow-gauge trains, Egger-Bahn produced a boat in N-scale. It was meant to become a mechanical moving boat in real water. This was the great love of Mr Theodor. He only produced one Mississippi-styled boat.

Egger also started the production of slotcars with the name of Egger-Silberpfeil. These models can also be found with Jouef. The Egger-models ran with a Jouef motor. The Egger-Lectron, a system for modular electronic experimentation, consisting of elements with magnetic links, has been a quite successful product. It was licensed by Braun and Raytheon, and later spun off in an independent company Lectron GmbH. The Lectron system is still in production today.
