= S scale =

Model railroad scale (1:64)

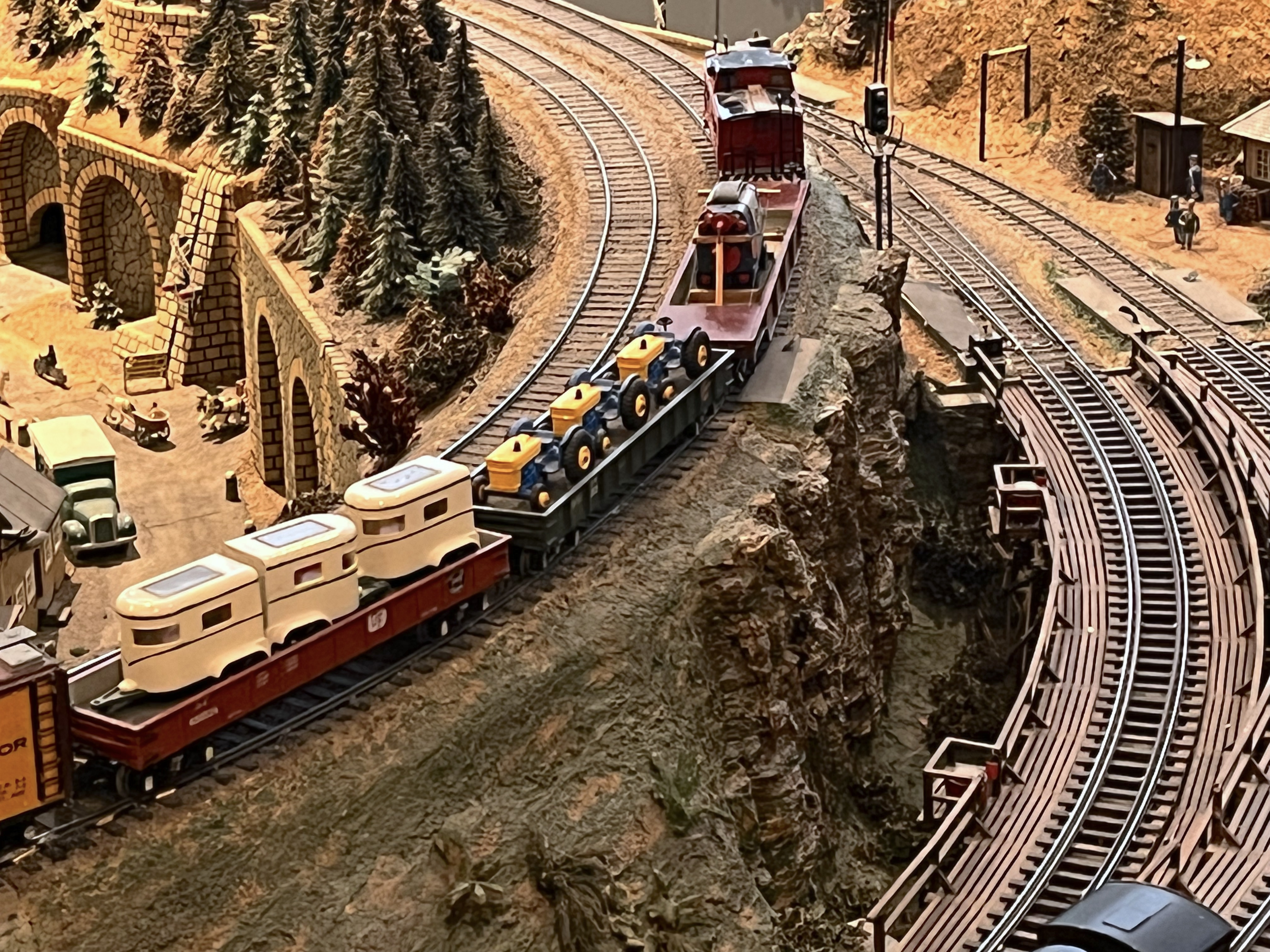
- German S scale model railroad
- Scale: 3/16 inch to 1 foot
- Scale ratio: 1:64
- Model gauge: 0.883–0.905 in (22.4–23.0 mm)
- Prototype gauge: 1,435 mm (4 ft 8 1/2 in) standard gauge

S scale (or S gauge) is a model railroad scale modeled at 1:64 scale, S scale track gauge (space between the rails) is 0.883–0.905 in (22.4–23.0 mm). S gauge trains are manufactured in both DC and AC powered varieties. S gauge is not to be confused with toy train standard gauge, a large-scale standard for toy trains in the early part of the 20th century.

== History ==
S scale is one of the oldest model railroading scales. The earliest known 1:64-scale train was constructed from card stock in 1896. The first working models appeared in England in the early 20th century. Modeling in S scale increased in the 1930s and 1940s when CD Models marketed 3/16-inch model trains.

American Flyer was a manufacturer of standard-gauge and O-gauge "tinplate" trains, based in Chicago, Illinois. It never produced S-scale trains as an independent company. Chicago Flyer was purchased by A.C. Gilbert Company in the late 1930s. Gilbert began manufacturing S-scale trains around 1939 that ran on three-rail "O"-gauge track. This was known as 3/16-inch O gauge. Gilbert stopped producing trains during the Second World War. When the war ended, Gilbert began producing true S-scale S-gauge trains in 1946 under the American Flyer mark.

The term S scale was adopted by the National Model Railroad Association (NMRA) in 1943 to represent that scale that was half of 1 gauge which was built to 1:32 scale. A.C. Gilbert's improvements in 1:64 modeling and promotions of S gauge largely shaped the world of 1:64 modeling today.

As early as 1948, an industrially produced narrow-gauge railway on tracks with a model gauge of 16.5 mm was available from the French company Allard. The vehicles in the scale of 1:60 to be assigned to today's Sm gauge run with direct current on commercially available H0-gauge centre-conductor tracks from the same manufacturer or from competitors, which also have a model gauge of 16.5 mm and centre conductor. The traction units, a steam locomotive and a rail bus (autorail), were also available with a clockwork drive.

S gauge entered what many consider its heyday in the 1950s (although there is more available in S scale today than was available during this period). However, during that period, Lionel outsold American Flyer nearly two-to-one. American Flyer's parent company went out of business and the brand was sold to a holding company that also owned Lionel in 1967.

Lionel re-introduced S-gauge trains and accessories under the American Flyer name in 1979. Another S manufacturer, American Models, entered the marketplace in 1981 and is now also one of the major S suppliers. S-Helper Service, another major S-gauge manufacturer of locomotives, rolling stock, track and other products, began operations in 1989 and delivered their first S products in 1990. In 2013, S-Helper Service was sold to MTH Electric Trains. And while the S-scale market has seen a number of brass model manufacturers, today the major brass model supplier in S scale and S gauge is River Raisin Models. Today's S-gauge and S-scale modelers have a greater selection and higher quality products, from a wide range of manufacturers, than at any time in the past. In addition to the basics of locomotives, rolling stock, and track, various manufacturers now offer S-scale structures, detail parts, figures, other scenic items, bridges, and more.

== Terminology ==
The terms "scale" and "gauge" are often confused. Strictly speaking, scale is the ratio of the size of a model to that of its prototype and gauge is the distance between the track railheads. In the case of S scale, the proportion is 1:64 or 3/16 inch modeling 1 foot. Standard S gauge track has a spacing of 0.883–0.905 in (22.4–23.0 mm). Three-foot gauge in S scale (Sn3 gauge) is 0.563–0.585 in (14.3–14.9 mm).

== Narrow gauge ==
- Sn3½ or Sn42 gauge - 3 ft 6 in (1,067 mm) gauge on 16.5 mm (0.65 in) gauge track (the same as HO scale Standard Gauge)
- Sm – 1 m gauge on 16.5 mm; Continental European.
- Sn3 - 3 ft (914 mm) gauge on 14.3 mm (0.563 in) gauge track.
- Sn2 gauge - 2 ft (610 mm) gauge by the majority on 10.5 mm (0.413 in), the same as HOn3 gauge track, or 9 mm (0.354 in), the same as N gauge track)

== Associations ==
The S scale SIG is an NMRA-affiliated special interest group dedicated to promoting and providing information on scale model railroading at 1:64. The National Association of S Gaugers serves as an organization to promote all forms of S gauge model railroading. The S Scale Model Railway Society also works to promote the scale in the UK.

== Notable layouts ==
The largest S scale layout in the United States is the Cincinnati in Motion exhibit at the Cincinnati Museum Center at Union Terminal. A large Sn3.5 or Sn42 scale layout of Swan View belongs to the Australian Model Railway Association in Bayswater, Western Australia

== See also ==
- Rail transport modelling
- Rail transport modelling scales
