= 00n3 =

Model railway scale

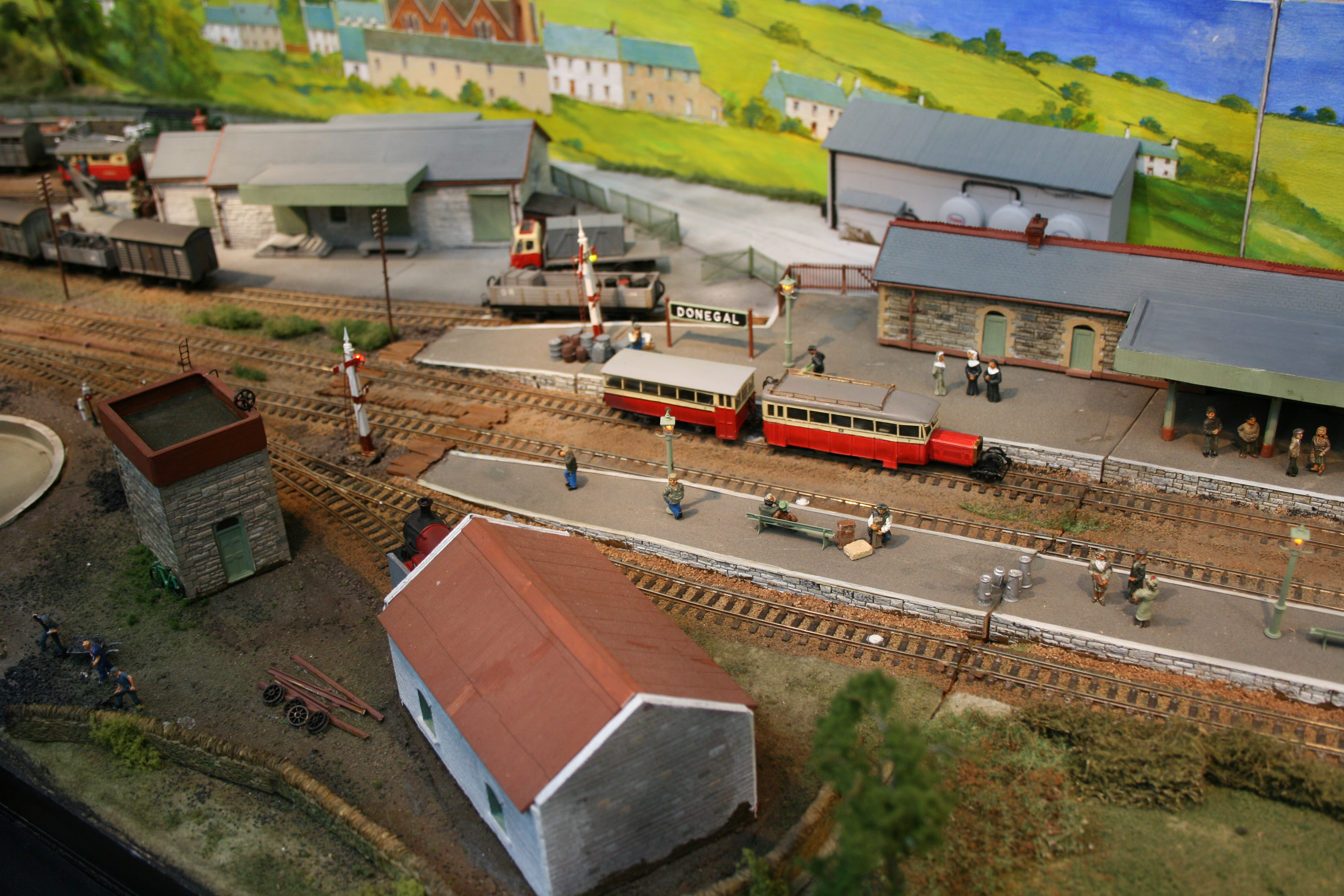
- A 00n3 model of Donegal on the County Donegal Railway as around 1950. Layout by Alan Gee.
- Scale: 4 mm to 1 ft (305 mm)
- Scale ratio: 1:76
- Model gauge: 12 mm (0.472 in)
- Prototype gauge: 3 ft (914 mm) (Narrow gauge)

00n3 is the description given to modelling 3 ft (914 mm) narrow gauge railways in 4 mm scale with 12 mm (0.472 in) gauge track. 3 ft (914 mm) prototypes were common in Ireland and the Isle of Man, but the scale is not generally used outside the British Isles. 12 mm (0.472 in) gauge track is the same as that used in TT scale and HOm, so some components used for those scales can be used.

There is no ready-to-run support, so everything must be either built from scratch or made from kits from Worsley Works(C&LR, T&DLR, WCR & others), Branchlines (IoMR, CVR, T&DLR), Backwoods Miniatures* (CDJR, CVR, L&BER, C&LR), Dundas Models (T&DLR & WCR], Model Engine Works (CVR & CDJR), Ninelines (CDJR & SR) and Alphagraphix (CDJR, L&LSR, L&BER) amongst others. *The Backwoods kits are slowly being reintroduced by N-Drive Productions. Kits are available in etched brass and nickel-silver (locos, railcars and some rolling stock), plastic, resin, white metal and card (rolling stock). There are now some 3D printed items of stock available, for example from Model Engine Works, CWRailways & TeBee Models.

00n3 modellers have close relations with other 4 mm narrow gauge modellers, especially 009 modelling.

== Exhibition layouts ==
00n3 layouts that are occasionally exhibited in Britain and Ireland (2019) include Annascaul (Tralee and Dingle Light Railway), Castlederg (Castlederg and Victoria Bridge Tramway), Letterkenny (County Donegal Railways Joint Committee), Castlefinn County Donegal Railways Joint Committee), Crosby (Isle of Man Railway), Strabane (County Donegal Railways Joint Committee), Southwold (Southwold Railway) and Mannin Middle (Isle of Man Railway inspired layout).

Burtonport (Letterkenny and Burtonport Extension Railway) is on permanent display in the Burtonport Railway Walk Museum situated in the St Columba's Community Centre in Burtonport, County Donegal. Dingle (Tralee and Dingle Light Railway ) is permanently based at the Windmill Museum, Blennerville, County Kerry. Donegal (County Donegal Railways Joint Committee) is on permanent display at the County Donegal Railway Heritage Centre, Donegal. There is an 00n3 diorama of Boot station at the Ravenglass and Eskdale Railway museum at Ravenglass, Cumbria and a diorama of Douglas engine shed (Isle of Man Railway) at the Port Erin Museum, Port Erin.

== Books published ==
A few books have been published to help the 00n3 modeller. Modelling the Irish Narrow Gauge (Peco Publications ISBN 0 900586 15 X) is a compilation of articles in the Railway Modeller written by David Lloyd and include his Augher and Coolcalaghta layouts. The County Donegal Railway Companion (Midland Publishing ISBN 1 85780 205 5) looks in depth at modelling all aspects of the popular County Donegal. The Isle of Man Railway - A modellers inspiration (Peco Publications ISBN 978 0 900586 95 8) helps those who want to model the Isle of Man Railway, again in all its aspects. Modelling Irish Railways (Midland Publishing ISBN 1 85780 185 7) looks at modelling the Irish railway scene with a chapter of information on the Irish 3'. The books are out of print.

== Magazine Articles ==
A number of 00n3 layouts have been featured in the Railway Modeller magazine. Abhainn an Scail/Annascaul (T&DLR) March 2014; Burtonport (LSR) February 2017, March 2017 & April 2017; Castleton (IMR) September 1993 & December 1993; Dingle (T&DLR) December 2002, January 2003 & February 2003; Donegal (CDJR) September 2006 & October 2006; Ramsey (IMR) October 2006. November 2006 & December 2006; Schull (S&SR) January 2012, February 2012, December 2012; Southwold (1922) (SR) November 2013.

'Freelance' layouts inspired by the Isle of Man Railway that have featured include Bradda West February 1995; Mannin Middle April 2009 & Port Foxdale September 2002.

'Historic' 00n3 layouts in the model railway press include Aire Valley by Derek Naylor (Railway Modeller April 1961); Llanfair Valley Railway by Rev P. Heath (Railway Modeller 1962, month t.b.c.); Uptha Valley Light Railway (Model Railway Constructor January 1963 t.b.c.); Vale of Fawrcarnedd Railway by Alan Brackenborough (Model Railway News 1965, month t.b.c.).

== Related scales ==
Outside the British Isles the slightly smaller 1:87 H0 is used. For European 1,000 mm (3 ft 3 3/8 in) (metre gauge) and African / Australian 3 ft 6 in (1,067 mm) gauge railways H0m is used. In America 3 ft (914 mm) gauge railroads are modelled on 10.5 mm (0.413 in) gauge track as HOn3.
