= 3 ft gauge rail modelling =

3' Gauge rail modelling is a specialisation in rail transport modelling. Specifically it relates to the modelling of narrow gauge prototypes of 3 ft (914 mm) gauge. This gauge was the most common narrow gauge in the United States and in Ireland. Apart from some other lines in North, Central and South America, the 3 ft gauge was uncommon elsewhere. Therefore, most 3 ft gauge modellers model either United States or Irish prototypes.

== United States ==
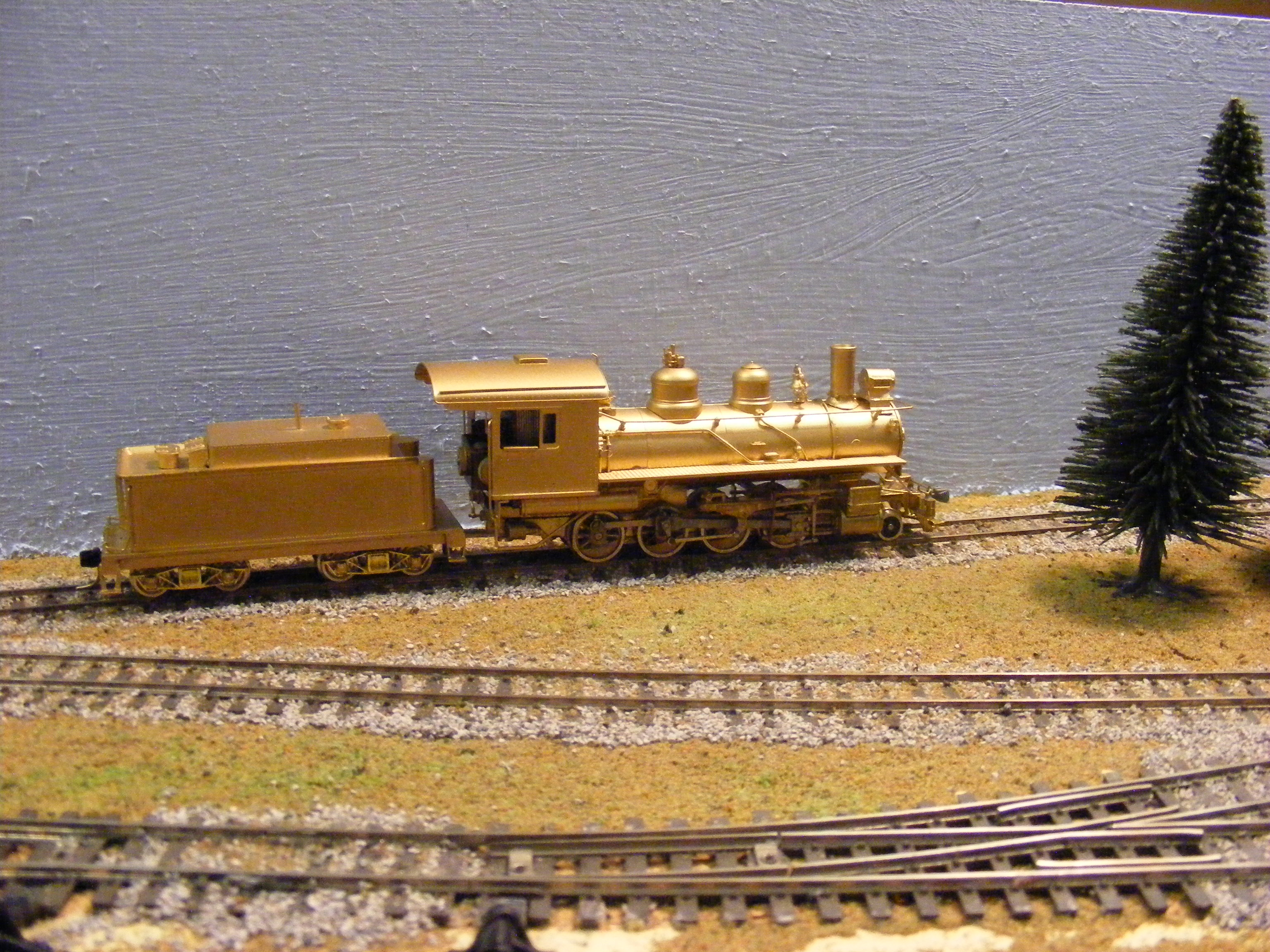
HOn3 – Malpaso County RR by Will Booth

3 ft (914 mm) gauge railroads were widespread in the United States in the period 1880-90. While most of these railroads were converted to standard gauge by the start of the 20th century, a number of lines survived till the Second World War, and became popular subjects for modelling.

Probably the most popular prototype is the Denver and Rio Grande Western Railroad, followed by other Colorado railroads such as the Rio Grande Southern and Colorado and Southern. Other railroads from California and the eastern states are also popular.

Scale and gauge combinations used in modelling include:

- Nn3 – Using N scale (1:160 ratio) with Z (6.5 mm / 0.256 in) gauge track.
- HOn3 – Using HO scale (1:87 ratio) with 10.5 mm (0.413 in) gauge track. Historically the most popular of the scale/gauge combinations.
- Sn3 – Using S scale (1:64 ratio) with 14.3 mm (0.563 in) gauge track. Limited commercial support.
- 55n3 - Using 5.5 mm scale (1:55 ratio) with 16.5 mm (0.65 in) gauge track. Supported by 5.5mm association.
- On3 – Using O scale (1:48 ratio) with 0.75 in (19.05 mm) gauge track. Probably the second most popular scale.
- F scale – using 1:20.3 ratio with 45 mm (1.772 in) gauge track. This scale uses the same gauge as, and is derived from, the popular G scale. It is the largest popular scale/gauge combination, and is suitable for use in the garden.

Perhaps not surprisingly, most narrow gauge modellers in the United States model US 3 ft gauge prototypes. However, these prototypes are also popular modelling subjects outside of the United States.

== Ireland, the Isle of Man, and Britain ==
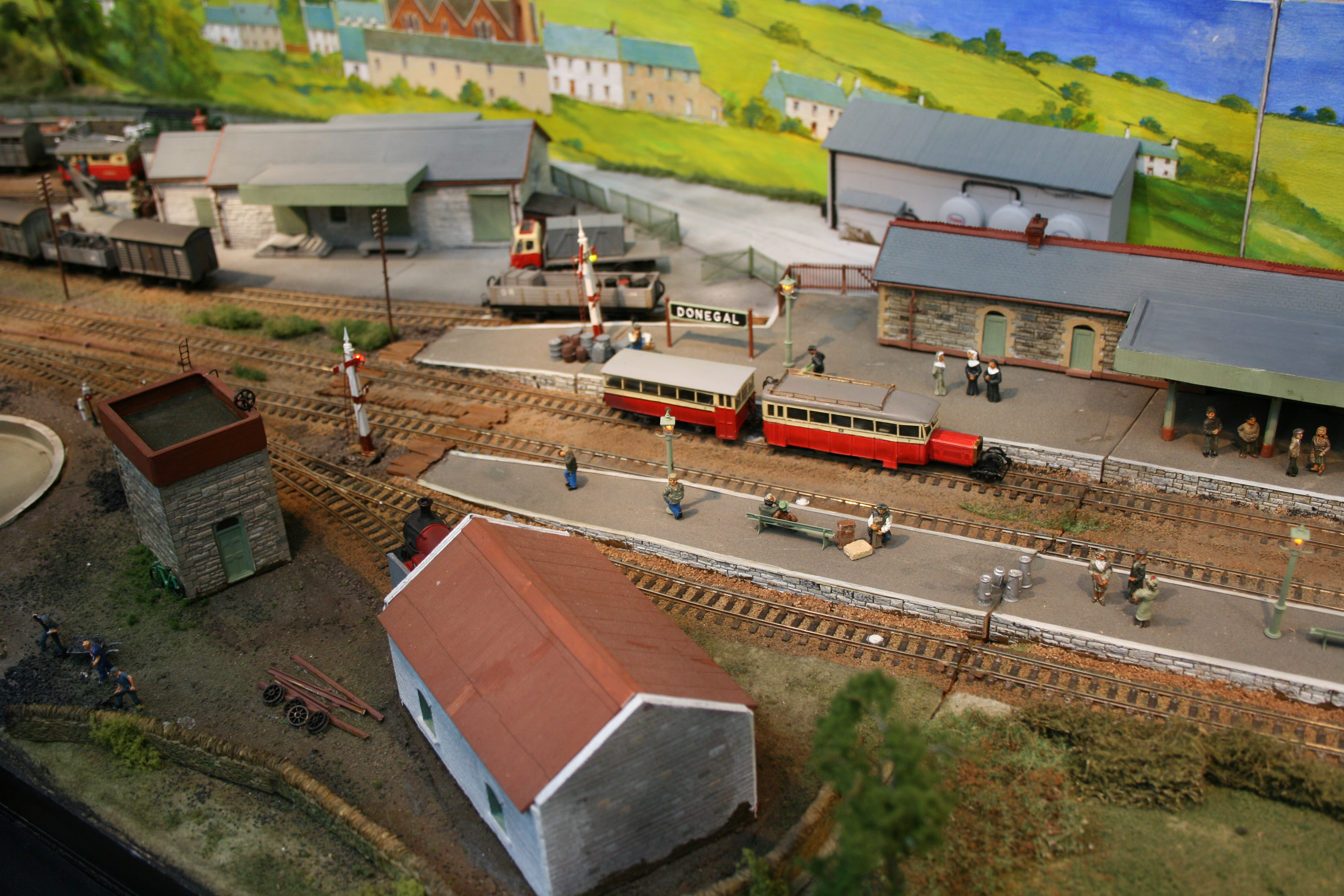
An OOn3 model of Donegal on the County Donegal Railway as around 1950. Layout by Alan Gee.

3 ft (914 mm) gauge was the narrow gauge used in Ireland, and the gauge of almost all the railways on the Isle of Man. It was also used on a handful of railways in Britain. However, modelling these 3 ft gauge railways is very much a minority pursuit, especially when compared with other prototypes such as the Welsh 2 ft (610 mm) narrow gauge. Scales and gauges used include:

| Scale (per foot) | Scale ratio | Name | Gauge |
|---|---|---|---|
| 2 mm scale | 1:148 | Nn3 | 6.5 mm (0.256 in) Z gauge |
| 3 mm scale | 1:101 | TTn3 | 9 mm (0.354 in) N gauge |
| 4 mm scale | 1:76 | OOn3 | 12 mm (0.472 in) TT gauge |
| 5.5 mm scale | 1:55 | 5.5 mm | 16.5 mm (0.65 in) OO gauge |
| 7 mm scale | 1:43.5 | O21 | 21 mm (0.827 in) |
| 15 mm | 1:20.3 | G scale | 45 mm (1.772 in) |

Generally these scale/gauge combinations do not have much commercial support, and therefore modellers are required to construct most of their models from scratch. 00n3 is the exception and there is good support from manufacturers like Branchlines (Isle of Man Railway and some Irish lines), Worsley Works (mostly Irish railway 'scratch aid' brass kits) and Alphagraphix (mostly card Irish rolling stock kits). Some model kits are not available new due to production having ceased but can be found on the preowned market including the Backwoods models of Irish narrow gauge locomotives and rolling stock.

== See also ==
- Model Railway Scales
- Sn3½ – scale for modelling 3'6" (1067mm) gauge railways.
- List of narrow-gauge model railway scales
- Rail transport modelling scales
- Three foot gauge railways
- 00n3
