= H0f gauge =

H0f
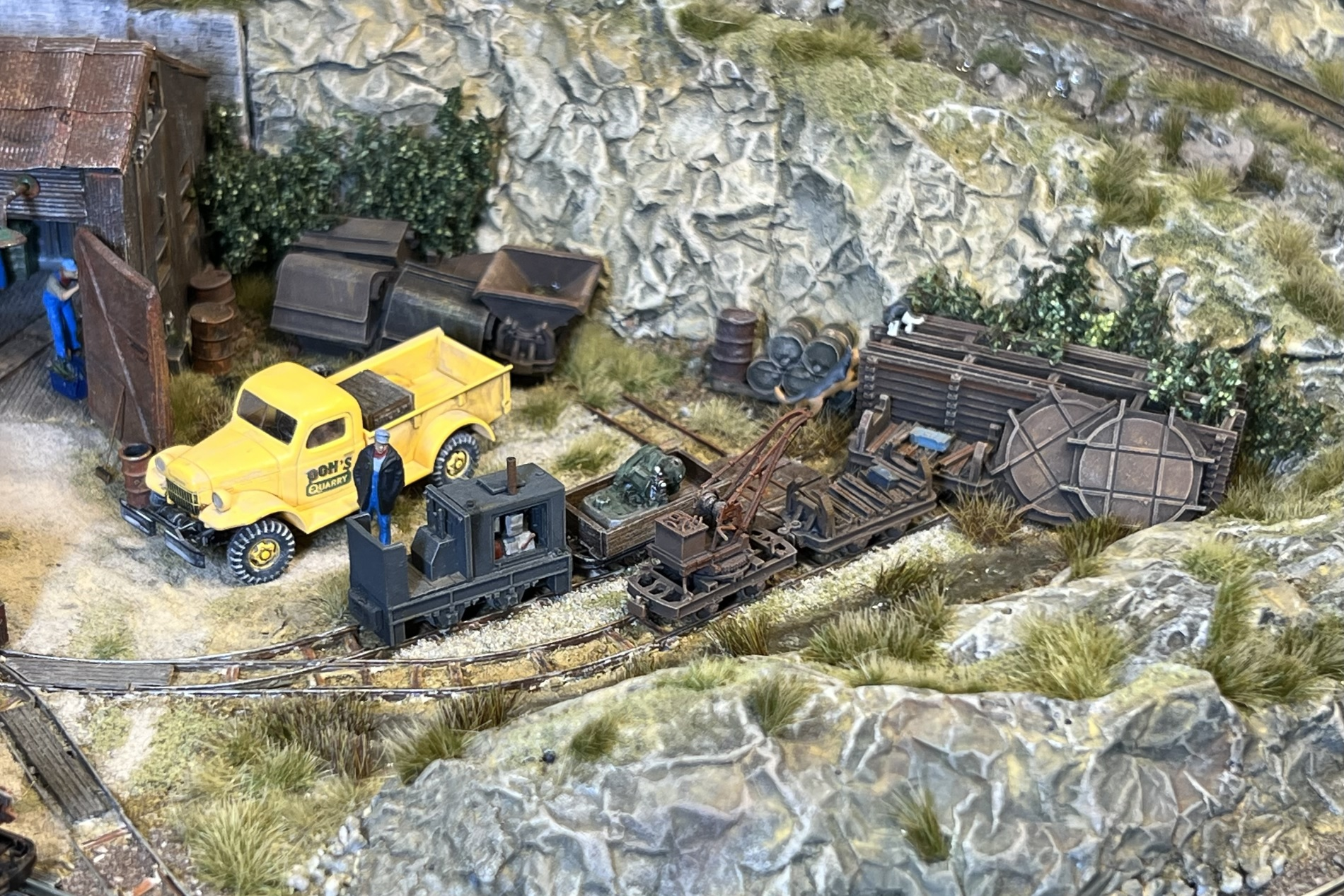
- Don's Quarry Sand Mining H0f layout in 1:87 scale
- Scale: 3.5 mm to 1 ft (305 mm)
- Scale ratio: 1:87
- Standard(s): NEM 010
- Model gauge: 6.5 mm (0.256 in)
- Prototype gauge: 600 mm (2 ft)

H0f gauge, occasional as H0i gauge designated, is a rail transport modelling scale representing Feldbahn-style 2 ft and 600 mm gauge railways using 1:87 HO scale running on Z gauge 6.5-millimetre (0.26 in) track. The Normen Europäischer Modellbahnen NEM 010 specification defines H0f for modelling gauges 400–650 millimetres (16–26 in), as part of the 1:87-scale family that includes narrow-gauge railway models using H0e gauge and metre-gauge railway models using H0m gauge.

== Rolling stock ==
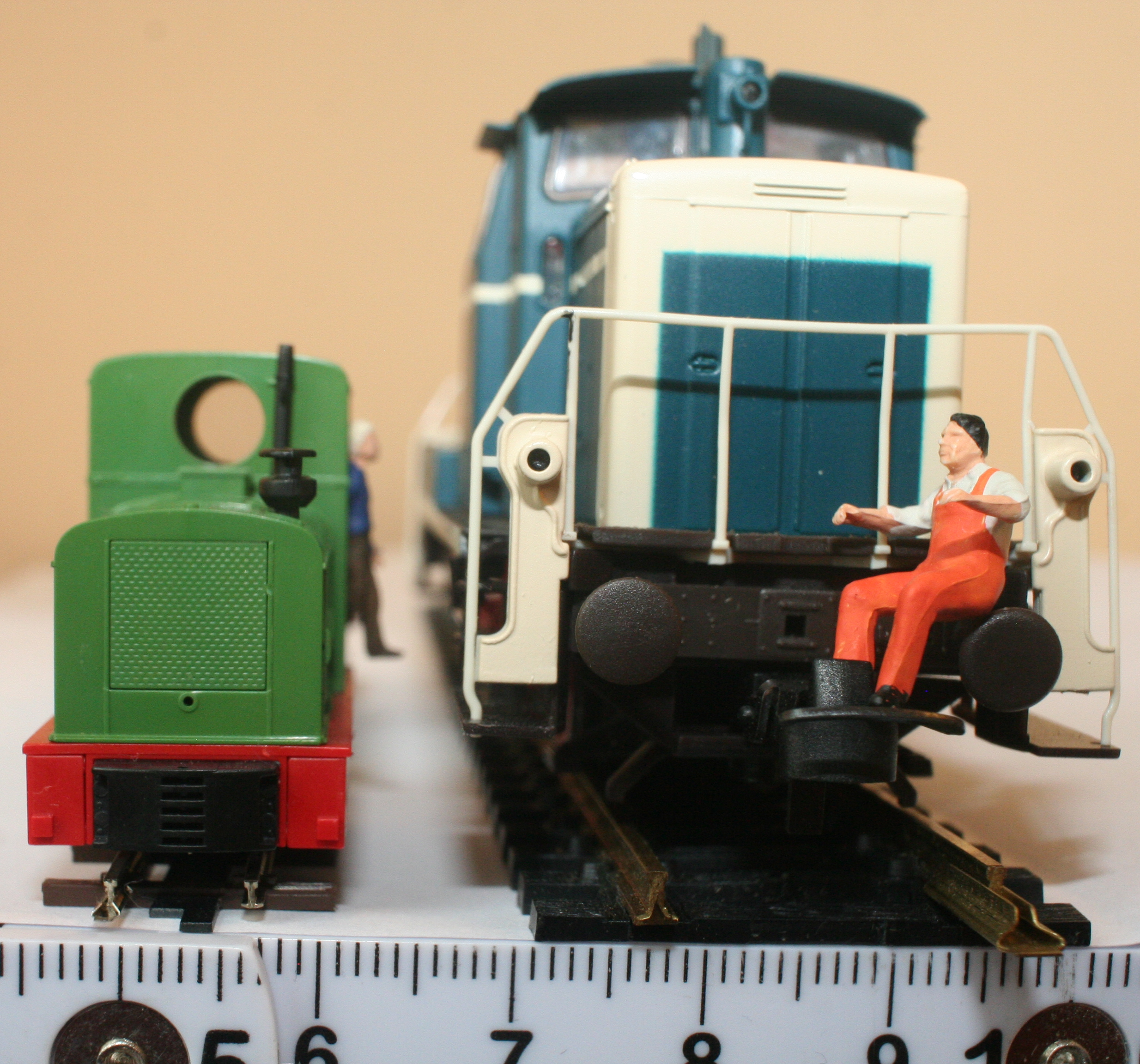
Comparison of H0f narrow gauge with H0 standard gauge, both 1:87 in scale

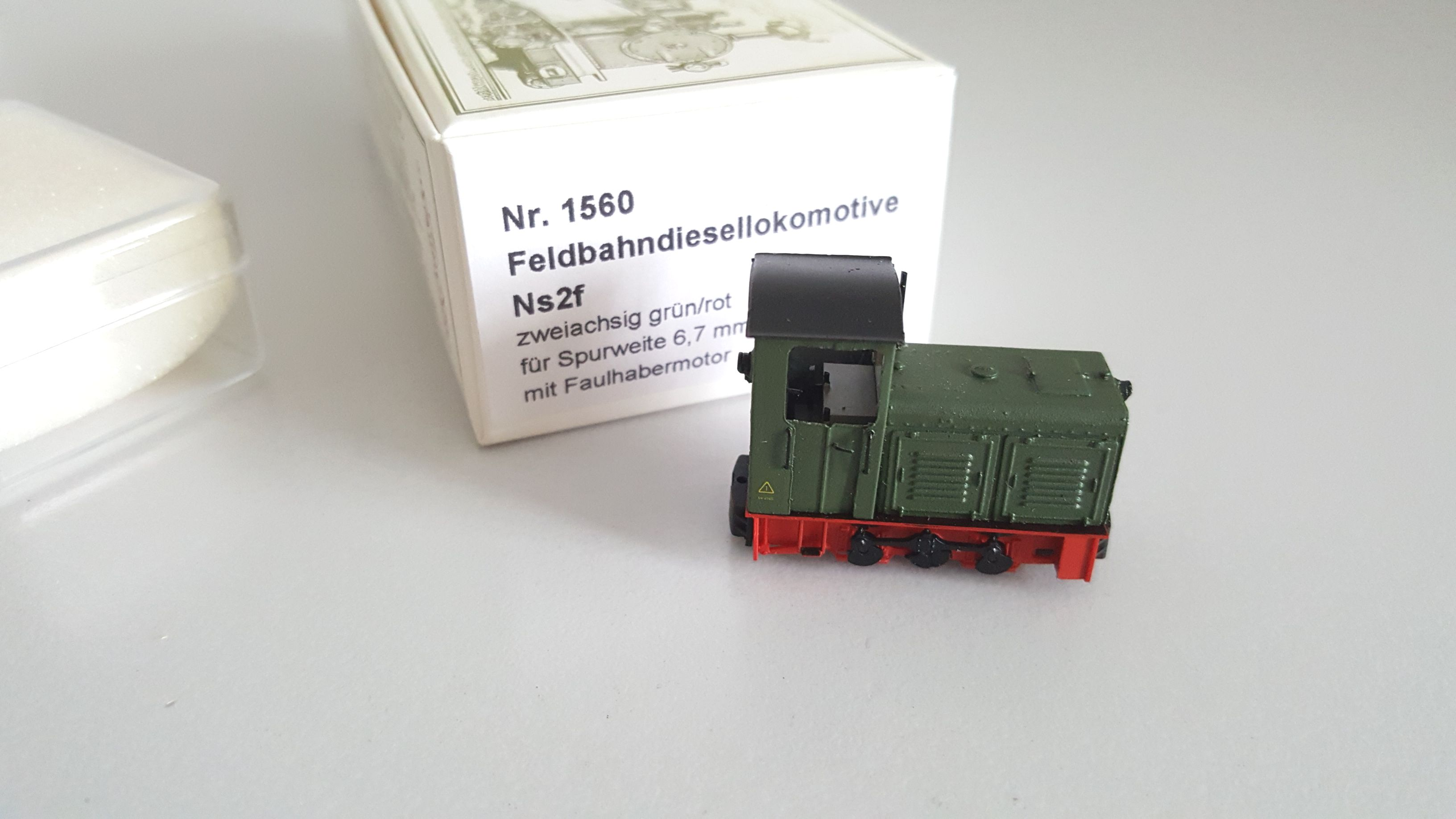
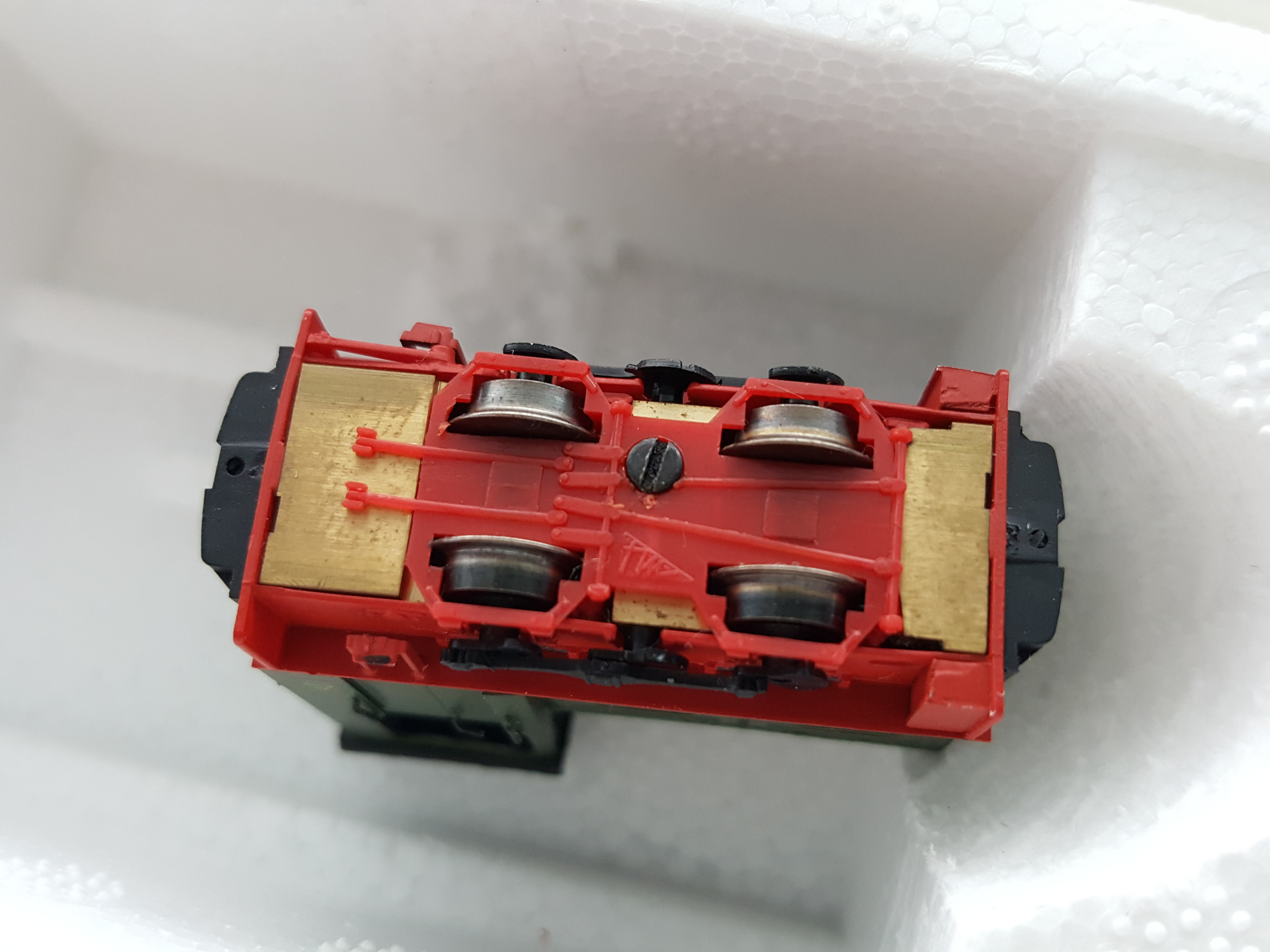
Technomodell LKM Ns2f locomotive for H0f gauge (1:87 scale, 6.7-mm gauge; showing chassis with metal construction)

As of 2007 three variants of the Babelsberg LKM Ns2f, along with tipper and flat wagons, were being manufactured by Technomodell, plus left-and-right-hand points, and flexi-track using 2.1 mm-high (0.083 in) rail. The NS2f models were completely metal in order to improve traction and allow gradients of three-percent to be negotiated with wagens. The NS2F chassis is 30 millimetres (1.2 in) long, and the locomotive body 38 millimetres (1.5 in) long.

In 2008 the company Panier were producing a model of the Lanz-Rail tractor in H0f gauge, and Präzisionsmodellbau were producing the LKM V10c (de) and Ns4f.

For the fiftieth-anniversary of the Saarbrücken Park Railway (de) in 2010, a model of the "Porschelok" (de) and matching carriages were produced in H0f.

=== Busch Feldbahn ===
H0f track and locomotives made by the German company Busch include a central magnetic strip hidden between the rails for greater adhesion. The magnet under the Busch H0f locomotives is extremely effective, allowing very steep gradients, climbing vertically, or running upside down.

The first Busch Mine Railway Starter Set (Grubenbahn Start-Set) was released in late-2010 and featured a BBA B360 mining locomotive (de) with three wagons, based on those at the Erzbahn in Schönborn-Dreiwerden, north of Chemnitz. The set came with 145-millimetre (5.7 in) radius Z scale track with 1:220 sleepers, and a separate rectangular metal base plate underlay for magnetic adhesion. The mining system was expanded with four more sets in 2011.

A much larger system of narrow gauge locomotives was introduced at the 2012 Nuremberg International Toy Fair, where Busch demonstrated a complete Feldbahn system with multiple locomotives wagons and specialist track. Models of a Gmeinder 15/18 horsepower locomotive were supplied to journalists and partners.

By the start of 2016 Busch was producing a Deutz OMZ 122f locomotive in three colours. At the 2016 Nuremberg International Toy Fair, an unpowered Lanz traktor model accompanied by a motorised goods van were shown, along with a Decauville Type 3 steam locomotive. One year late in 2017 a model of the Frankfurt Feldbahn Museum's (de) steam locomotive Dimitrias was shown. The separate firm Modellbau Luft started to make alternative locomotive and "ghost wagon" housings for mounting on the Busch Feldbahn chassis.

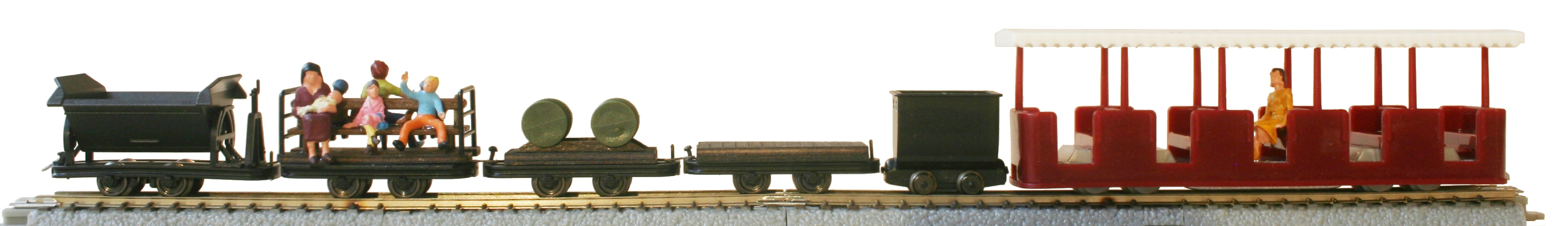
H0f wagons with pin-and-link-, magnetic- and bar couplings
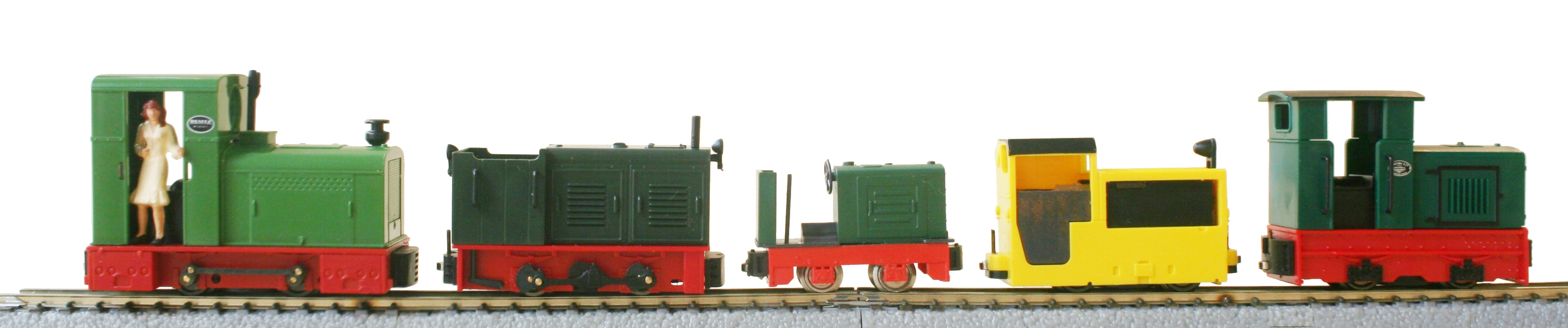
H0f locomotives, four with 3-volt motors, and one without motor (in centre)

== Track ==
Commodity Z gauge track is the correct gauge, although the sleeper style and sleeper spacing are the wrong scale for H0f modelling:

Track components available for 6.5 mm gauge
| Component | Radius | Angle | | Straight | | Manufacturer | Part number |
|---|---|---|---|---|---|---|---|
| Turnout | 127 mm | 26 | ° | 55 | mm | Rokuhan | R022, R023 |
| Turnout | 140 mm | 24 | ° | | | Modell & Funktion Burmester | 7331, 7332 |
| Turnout | 175 mm | 22 | .5° | 66 | .6 mm | Busch | 12341, 12342 |
| Turnout | | 20 | ° | | | PMT Technomodell | 56613, 56614 |
| Curved turnout | 195 + 220 mm | 30 | ° | | | Märklin | 8568, 8569 |
| Curved turnout | 195 + 220 mm | 30 | ° | | | Rokuhan | R026, R027, R057, R058 |
| Turnout | 200 mm | 18 | ° | | | Modell & Funktion Burmester | 7321, 7322 |
| Double-slip | 323 mm | 13 | ° | 112 | .8 mm | Märklin | 8559, 8560 |
| Double-slip | | 13 | ° | 112 | .8 mm | Rokuhan | R034, R035 |
| Turnout | 400 mm | 9 | ° | | | Modell & Funktion Burmester | 7311, 7312 |
| Turnout | 490 mm | 13 | ° | 110 | mm | Märklin | 8562, 8563, 8565, 8566 |
| Turnout | 490 mm | 13 | ° | 110 | mm | Rokuhan | R039, R040, R055, R056 |
| Turnout | 490 mm | 13 | ° | 110 | mm | Micro-Trains | 990 40-910, -911, -914, -915 |
| Crossing | | 90 | ° | 25 | mm | Rokuhan | R025 |
| Crossing | | 90 | ° | 33 | .3 mm | Busch | 12340 |
| Crossing | | 13 | ° | 112 | .8 mm | Rokuhan | R020 |

Three-rail flexi-track made for H0/H0e (16.5 mm + 9 mm) can be used because the third gauge is ~6.5 mm, but with full-size 1:87 sleepers.

== Related standards ==
HOn2
- Scale: 3.5 mm to 1 foot
- Scale ratio: 1:87.1
- Standard(s): NMRA S-3.2
- Model gauge: 7.06 mm (0.278 in)
- Prototype gauge: 600 mm (2 ft)

In North American, HOn2 gauge is specified for representing 2 ft and 600 mm gauge railways using 1:87.1 HO scale running on 7.06-millimetre (0.278 in) track. The NMRA S-3.2 specification defines HOn2 as part of the 1:87.1-scale family.

== See also ==
- List of narrow-gauge model railway scales
