= Sn3½ =

- Scale: 3/16 in (4.8 mm) to 1 ft (305 mm)
- Scale ratio: 1:64
- Model gauge: 16.5 mm (0.65 in)
- Prototype gauge: 3 ft 6 in (1,067 mm)

In rail transport modelling, Sn3½ is a scale/gauge combination derived from S scale to represent narrow gauge 3 ft 6 in (1,067 mm) track by using 16.5 mm (0.65 in) gauge track (the same as HO gauge). The scale is 1:64.

Sn3½ is popular in South Africa, Australia (particularly Western Australia, Queensland and Tasmania where narrow gauge systems exist) and New Zealand.

Sn3½ is very rarely or never used for modelling in other countries with 3 foot 6 (1067mm) gauge railways such as in Japan, Taiwan, and Indonesia

== Track ==
As 3 ft 6 in (1,067 mm) track scales down to 16.5 mm at 1:64, modelers use HO gauge track (which represents standard gauge at 1:87 scale) on Sn3½ layouts.

== New Zealand ==
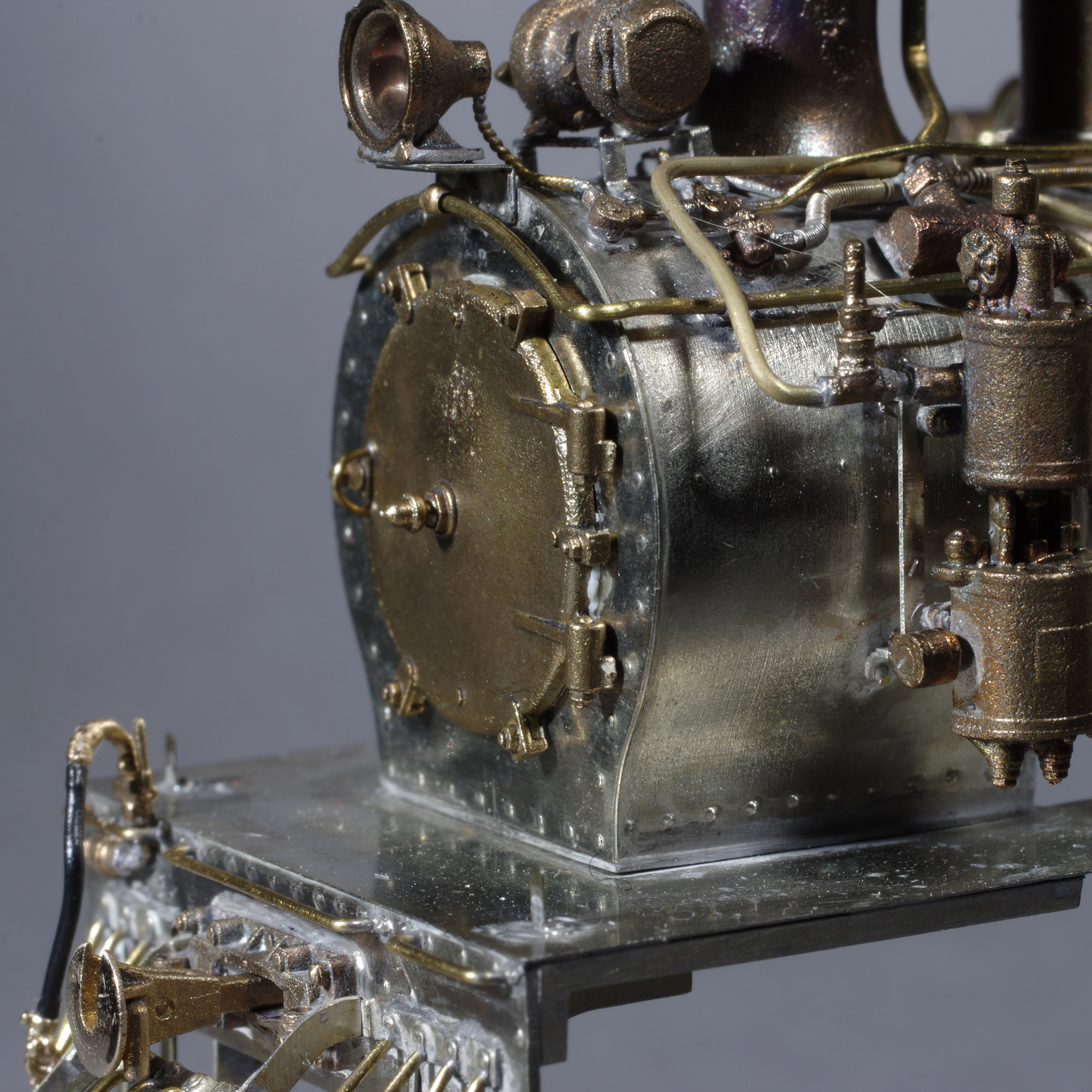
S scale, NZR W class locomotive from New Zealand Finescale.

Sn3½ is the primary scale for modeling New Zealand's narrow gauge 3 ft 6 in railways. The majority of rolling stock available, are white-metal kits, making them considerably more expensive and heavier than other scales and countries. Many of these kits are highly detailed. Buildings are generally hand-made, and track (HO gauge track) can either be purchased or hand laid with sleepers and rail. Alternatives for modeling New Zealand railways is 1:120 or TT scale, known as NZ120, as it is a cheaper option. HOn3½ gauge, HO scale with 12mm gauge, is also increasing in popularity.

=== New Zealand Sn3½ suppliers and manufacturers ===
- South Dock Models
- Railmaster Exports
- New Zealand Finescale
- North Yard (Model Railway Parts)

== Sm ==
Sm gauge is also defined by the German NEM 10 standard, representing Continental European metre gauge.

== See also ==
- List of narrow-gauge model railway scales
- Rail transport modelling
- Rail transport modelling scales
- List of rail transport modelling scale standards
