= Worsley Works =

Model railroad manufacturer

Worsley Works, is a manufacturer of kits for model railway carriages and locomotives, owned and run from Worsley, near Manchester, England UK, by Allen Doherty.

Worsley Works is well known in the finescale modelling world, especially in less-popular scales, including British HO scale and 3mm-scale models along with various kits for Narrow Gauge railways, particularly OO9 and OOn3.

Assembly of Worsley Works kits, like for most other kits that comprise only etched components, is challenging. Worsley specialises in what are described as 'scratch aid' kits, indicating that the kits are not intended to build complete models in themselves, but rather to provide the essential components to assist the process of scratch building. By manufacturing only the etched brass or nickel silver components of the models, the company is able to produce a wide range of kits in many scales. They have also taken on many commissions including a Metropolitan 4-4-4T recently.
