= Gn15 =

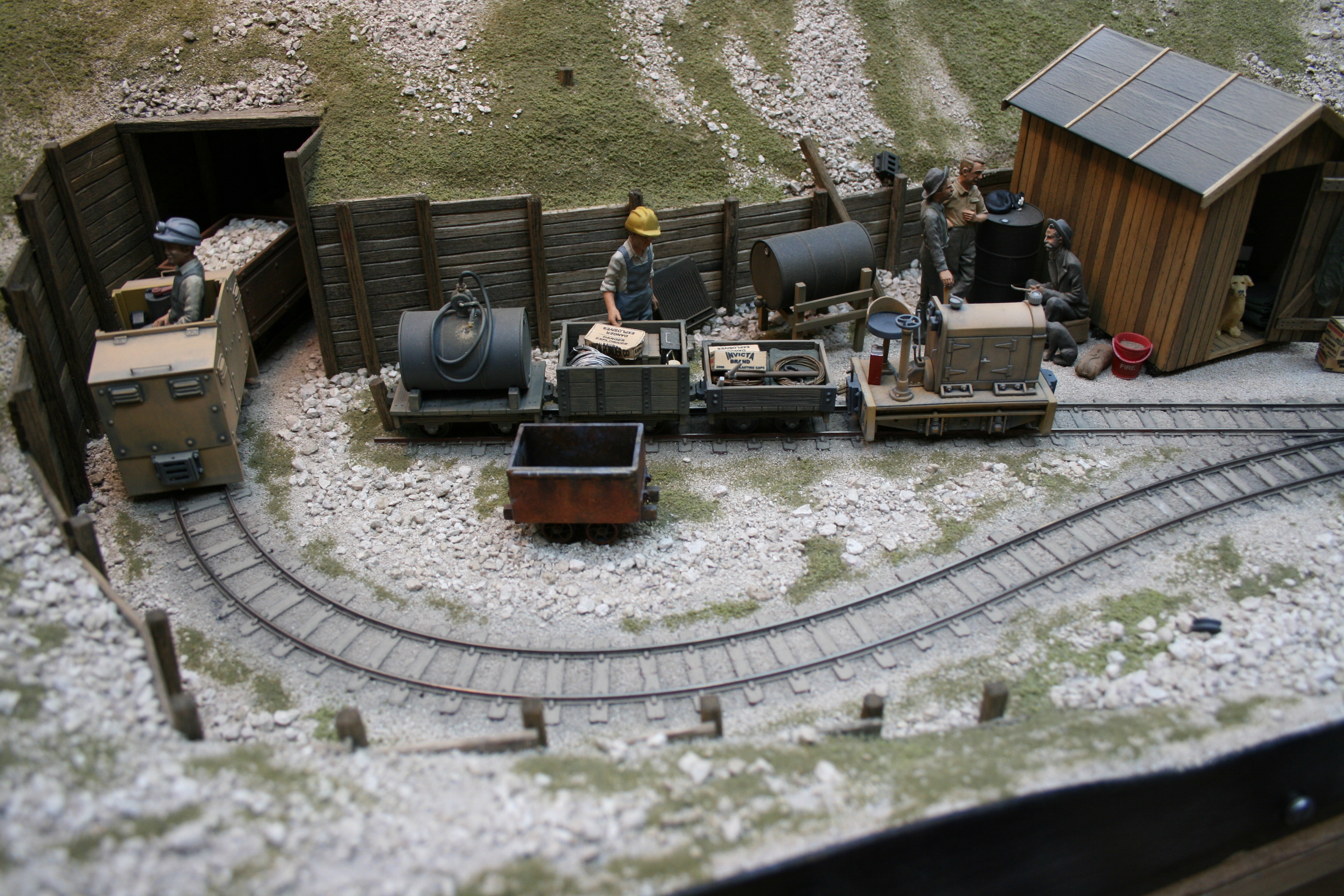
- The Sidelines Kits Gn15 demo layout
- Scale ratio: 1:22.5 – 1:29
- Model gauge: 16.5 mm (0.65 in)
- Prototype gauge: 15 in (381 mm) (Minimum-gauge railway)

Gn15 is a rail modelling scale, using G scale 1:22.5 scale trains running on H0/00 gauge (16.5 mm / 0.65 in) track, representing minimum-gauge and miniature railways. Typical models built are between 1:20.3 and 1:24, or up to 1:29.

Normen Europäischer Modellbahnen NEM 010 specification defines IIp for modelling 300–400 millimetres (12–16 in) gauge.

== History ==
Gn15 modeling is a relatively new phenomenon in the model railroading world. While the idea of this scale has existed for some time, as evidenced by the early efforts of Marc Horovitz, editor of Garden Railways magazine, Gn15 did not gain any measure of popularity until the Sidelines range of models. Following the advent of these kits, a few other lines of kits became available.

Initial community development took place on Yahoo email groups, but these have been superseded by the forums at the now defunct Gn15.info as the primary form of communication between the far flung practitioners of this scale.

== 09, GNine and related scales ==
Alongside Gn15 other modeling scales have developed to cover both the modelling of minimum-gauge lines in scales smaller than G, and 'miniature' lines (less than 15 in / 381 mm) in G scale.

O9 or On15 is the use of N-gauge track in 7mm scale to represent a minimum-gauge line. In comparison, GNine is the use of 9mm track to represent 'miniature' lines. GNine is a 'flexible' term for scale, referring to modelling using garden railway scales and N-gauge track. GNine models can be built to scales between 7/8" and 1:35 representing anything between 5 in (127 mm) gauge and 12 1/4 in (311 mm) miniature railways.
