= HOn30 gauge =

Modelling of narrow-gauge railways

HOn30 (also called HOn2½, HO9 and H0e) gauge is the modelling of narrow-gauge railways in HO on N-gauge track (9 mm / 0.354 in) in 1:87 scale ratio.

== Definitions ==
The term HOn30 (and sometimes HOn2½) is generally used when modelling American railroads while H0e is used for European railways. In Britain, the term OO9 is used. All these terms refer to models of narrow-gauge railways built to the world's most popular model railway scale of HO (1:87) but using a track gauge of 9 mm (0.354 in)—the gauge used for N-scale models of standard-gauge railways. OO9 refers to OO scale, 1:76.2, models on 9-millimetre-gauge track. Although the track gauge is 9 mm, sometimes N-scale track per se is not used because the ties or sleepers are out of scale and too close together. As such, HOn30 track is available.

=== HOn30 ===
HOn30
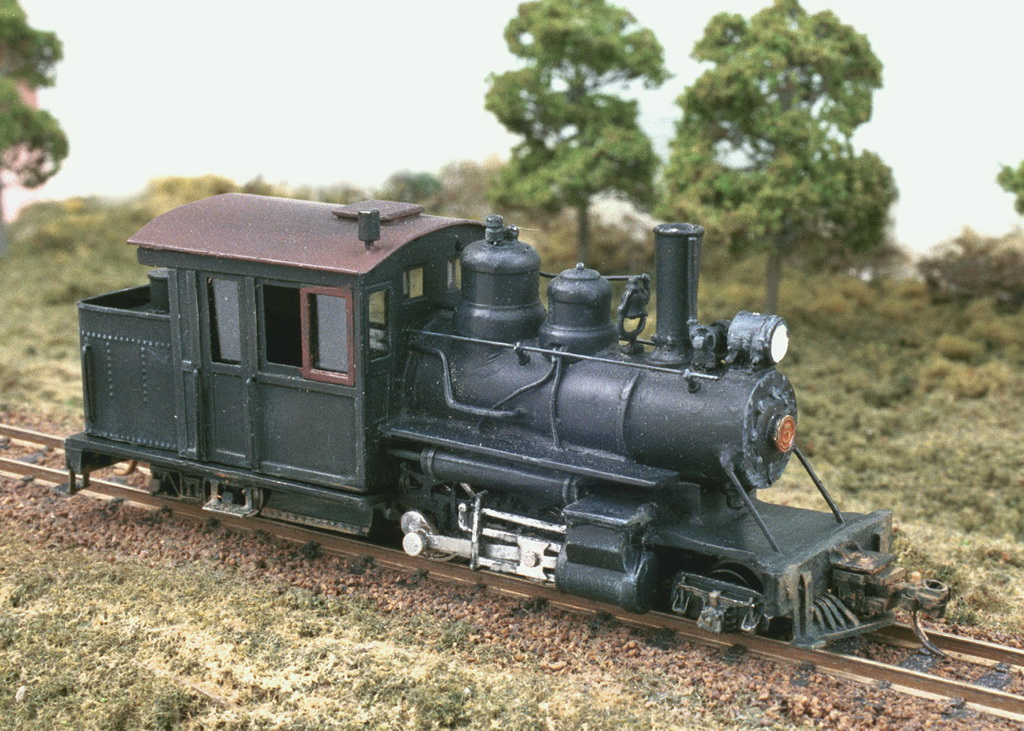
- Chivers Finelines Forney 2-4-4, built by Peter Bartlett
- Scale: 3.5 mm to 1 ft (305 mm)
- Scale ratio: 1:87
- Model gauge: 9 mm (0.354 in)
- Prototype gauge: 2 ft (610 mm) (narrow gauge)

HOn30 is often used to model the 2 ft (610 mm) gauge railroads in the US state of Maine. The first HOn30 / HOn2½ ready-to-run (RTR) brand introduced in the US was the AHM MinitrainS, initially manufactured by Egger-Bahn and later by Roco and Mehanoteknika Izola, also known as Mehano.

=== H0e ===
H0e
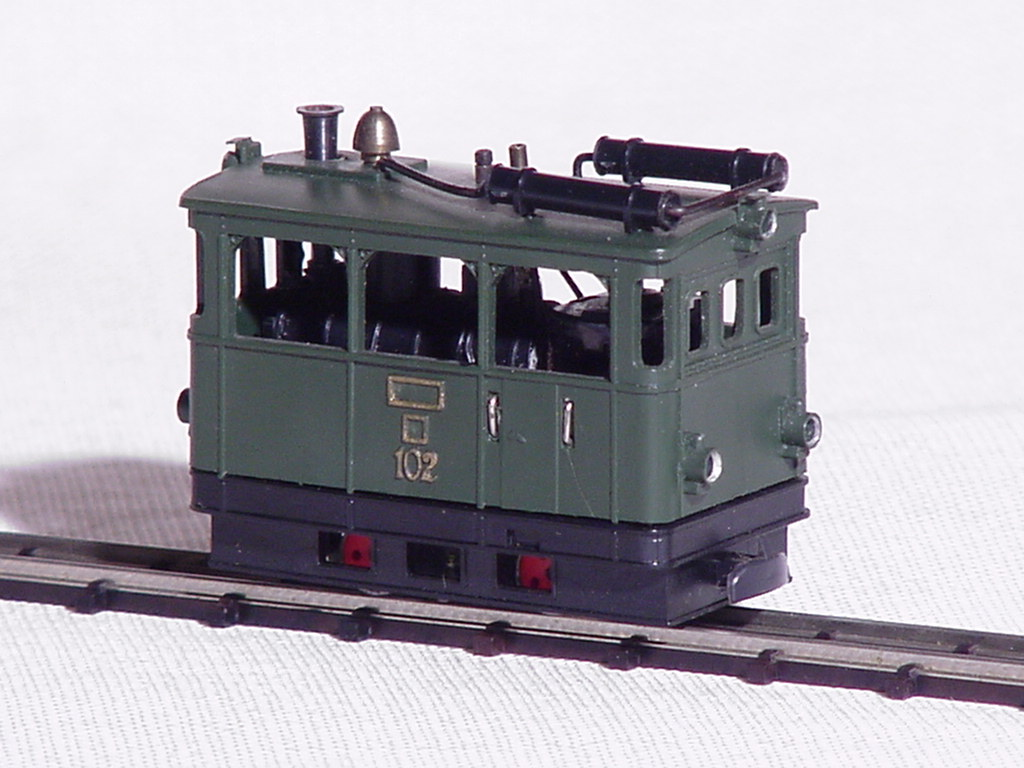
- Egger-Bahn Steam Tram
- Scale: 3.5 mm to 1 ft (305 mm)
- Scale ratio: 1:87
- Model gauge: 9 mm (0.354 in)
- Prototype gauge: 760 mm (2 ft 5 15/16 in) (Narrow gauge)

H0e is a gauge defined by the Normen Europäischer Modellbahnen (NEM). According to that standard, H0e represents narrow gauges between 650 and 850 mm (25 9/16–33 7/16 in), though it is often used to represent 600 mm (1 ft 11 5/8 in) gauge railways as well. In strict scale H0e represents a theoretical gauge of 783 mm (30.8 in), which does not exist as a prototype. But this is very close to the gauge of the 750 mm (2 ft 5 1/2 in) gauge railways most widely used in Germany, 760 mm (2 ft 5 15/16 in) gauge railways Bosnian gauge most widely used in the former Austro-Hungarian empire, 800 mm (2 ft 7 1/2 in) gauge rack railways in Switzerland as well as to the 2 ft 6 in (762 mm) gauge used in parts of the British Empire.

== Development ==
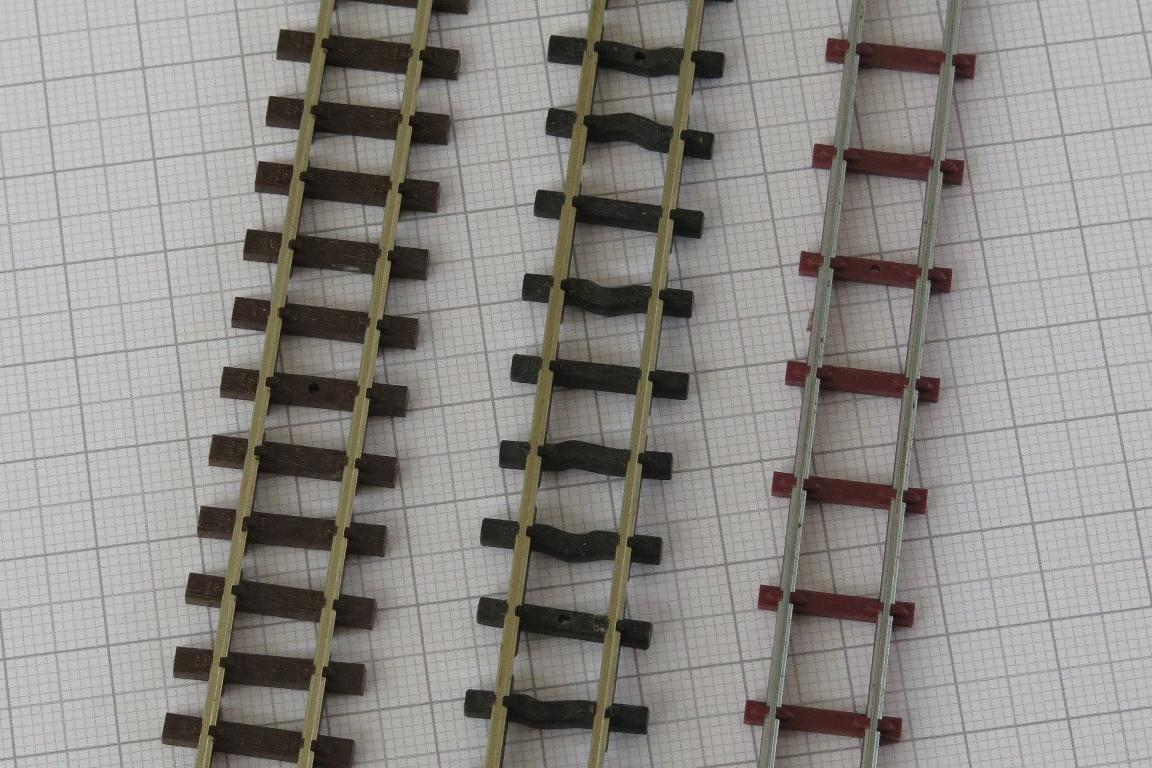
From left to right: Narrow-gauge railways, field railway and Decauville system track with a model gauge of 9 mm (0.354 in).

H0e scale was invented by Egger-bahn in 1963 - for a long time out of production, but some of the Egger-Bahn line has been reintroduced by MinitrainS. Other manufacturers to produce HOe in recent years have included Roco, Liliput, Bemo and Tillig.

=== United States ===
In 1965 Bob Hayden and Dave Frary stumbled upon an Associated Hobby Manufacturer's AHM "MinitrainS" HOn2 1/2 (now named HOn30) train set at a Woolworth's department store and decided to use it to model Maine 2-foot railroads in HO scale.

The AHM MinitrainS line was introduced only a few years after N scale appeared in Europe. The product line represented North American prototypes in HO scale, using N-gauge track. AHM offered two industrial locomotives, a Plymouth diesel and a Baldwin steam locomotive.

Hayden & Frary used the AHM trains to model an HOn2 1/2 3-by-5-foot (0.91 m × 1.52 m) portable model railroad called the Elk River Line. The layout appeared in articles starting in the April 1970 issue of Railroad Model Craftsman.

The pair built a second HOn2 1/2 layout called Thatcher's Inlet, a 6-foot-by-30-inch (1.83 m × 0.76 m) shelf-type switching layout. It was inspired by the Wiscasset waterfront of the Maine 2-foot railroads. The equipment was based more on available N-gauge products than on the AHM MinitrainS line – it reflected the growing variety of N-gauge equipment and accessories available in the early 1970s.

Next came Dave Frary's 12-by-26-foot (3.7 m × 7.9 m) HOn2 1/2 Carrabasset & Dead River Ry (C&DR), one of the first known large model railroad to utilize HOn2 1/2. It appeared in the November 1979 and February 1980 issues of Model Railroader.

In 1974, Bob Hayden started his own version of the C&DR. Its first engine was a reworked AHM MinitrainS steamer. The first C&DR road diesels, Nos. 25 and 26, were based on Minitrix N-gauge Fairbanks-Morse switchers. Hayden's C&DR was featured in Model Railroader's Great Model Railroads 1991 annual.

During the mid-1970s a Japanese company, Sango, made a kit for a 2-6-0 Baldwin engine which showed a great improvement in running ability. This started a growing interest in HOn2 1/2 in Japan. From 1978 to 1982, Joe Works, Sango, and Flying Zoo kits and built-up brass models came on the scene. There was a thriving interest in Japan in 2-footers using N-gauge track, as this allowed more HO-scale modeling in less space than traditional HO-gauge track.

== Related scales ==
The other NEM defined narrow gauges for H0 scale are H0m gauge (using 12 mm / 0.472 in gauge originally TT scale track) for models of 1,000 mm (3 ft 3 3/8 in) gauge and similar prototypes and H0i or H0f gauge (using Z-scale 6.5 mm / 0.256 in track) for prototypes around 600 mm (1 ft 11 5/8 in) – the most popular gauge for industrial (or Feldbahn) railways.

In the United Kingdom where the most popular railway modelling scale is 1:76 designated 4 mm scale. The narrow-gauge equivalents to H0e and H0m are OO9 and OO12. For modelling 3 ft (914 mm) gauge railways – widely used in Ireland and the Isle of Man – a 12 mm (0.472 in) gauge track (as for H0m) is used. For modelling the same 3 ft (914 mm) track in HOn3 or OOn3 – widely used in the United States – the track is 10.5 mm (0.413 in).

In the United States the NMRA have developed many standards for narrow-gauge modelling, including those modelling in HOn30 and its related gauges.

== Summary ==
=== Table ===
The following table lists the most popular narrow gauges in HO and OO scale:

Name	Scale	Model gauge	Prototype gauge	Used in
H0p	1:87	4.5 mm (0.177 in)	300 to <400 mm	Continental Europe
H0f/H0i	1:87	6.5 mm (0.256 in)	400 to <650 mm	Continental Europe
HOn2	1:87	7 mm (0.276 in)	2 ft (610 mm)	Americas
HOn30 (HOn2½)	1:87	9 mm (0.354 in)	2 ft 6 in (762 mm)	America
H0e	1:87	9 mm (0.354 in)	650 to <850 mm	Continental Europe
OO9	1:76	9 mm (0.354 in)	2 ft 3 in (686 mm)	Great Britain
HOn3	1:87	10.5 mm (0.413 in)	3 ft (914 mm)	America
H0m	1:87	12 mm (0.472 in)	850 to <1250 mm	Continental Europe
HOn3½	1:87	12 mm (0.472 in)	3 ft 6 in (1,067 mm)	Great Britain if scale is 1:87
OO12	1:76	12 mm (0.472 in)	3 ft (914 mm)	Great Britain

=== Remarks ===
Model railroaders with layouts and rolling stocks by American standard and usually by British standard use for designation of the scale in English language publications the letter O and not the number 0.

In Great Britain and rarely in the French language for narrow gauge it is written after designation of the scale the model gauge in millimetres, for example, OO9 or OO6.5 in United Kingdom and H09 rather than H0e or H06,5 rather than H0f in France.

In Great Britain and in the French language it is written sometimes with a hyphen or en dash between the scale and the model gauge, for example, OO–9 or H0-9.

== See also ==
- OO9 gauge narrow-gauge railways in OO scale on N-gauge track (9 mm / 0.354 in) in 1:76 scale ratio
- List of narrow-gauge model railway scales
