= H0m gauge =

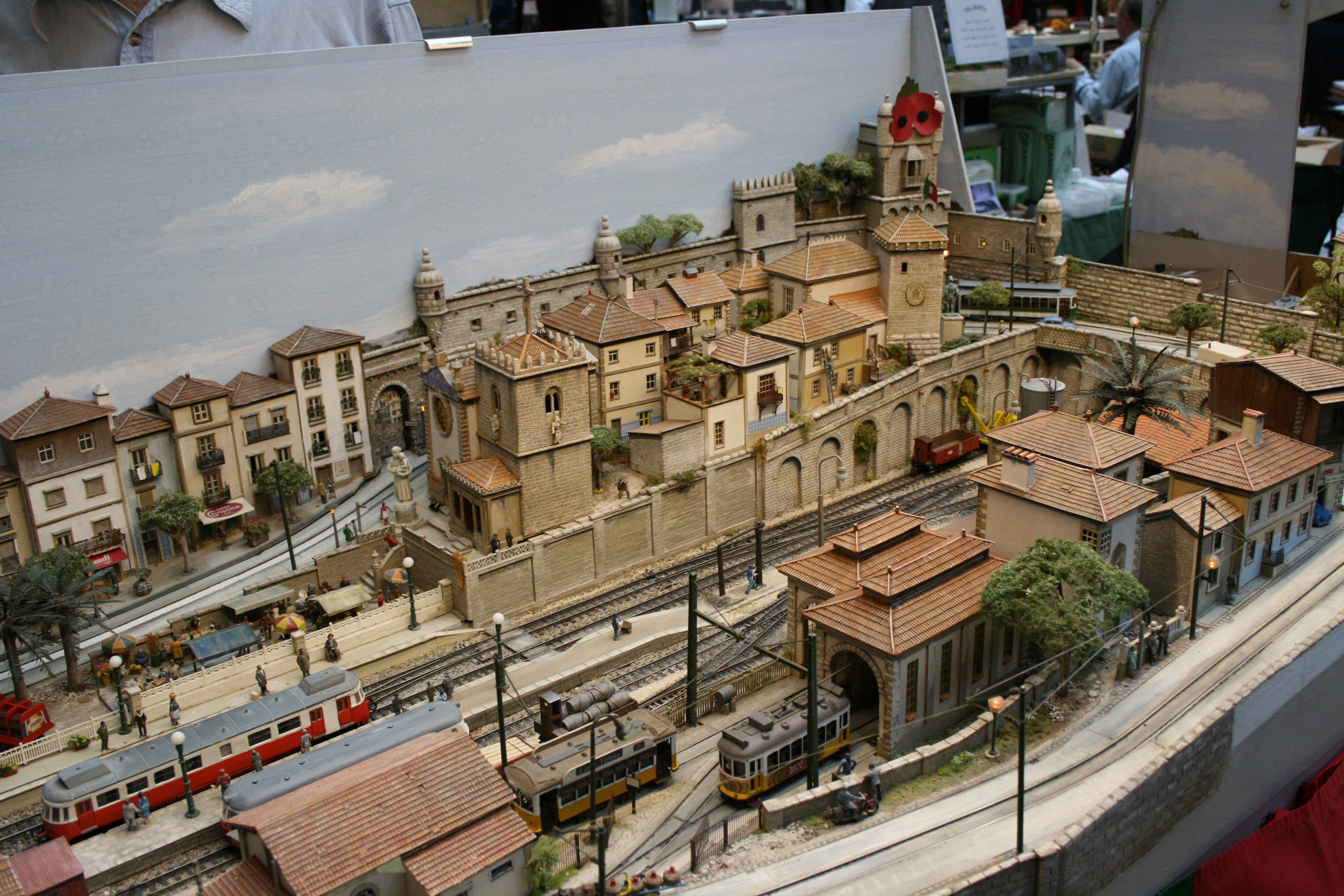
- A H0m layout set in Portugal
- Scale: 3.5 mm to 1 ft (305 mm)
- Scale ratio: 1:87
- Model gauge: 12 mm (0.472 in)
- Prototype gauge: 850 mm (33 in) to 1,250 mm (49 in), including 1,000 mm (3 ft 3 3/8 in) metre gauge

The H0m gauge is designed for the reproduction of narrow gauge railways with a prototype gauge of 850 to 1,250 millimetres (33 to 49 in) in H0 scale. The letter m stands for metre prototype gauge with a track width of 1000 mm. It runs on 12 mm (0.472 in) TT scale tracks. Modern H0m trains run on realistic-looking two-rail track, which is powered by direct current (varying the voltage applied to the rails to change the speed, and polarity to change direction), or by Digital Command Control (sending commands to a decoder in each locomotive). It is a popular scale in Europe, particularly for trains of Swiss outline.

Ready to run models are widely available from companies like Bemo and D+R Modellbahn, a number of companies including, Lemaco and Ferro-suisse, also produced more detailed handmade brass models.

H0m track is also used in Australia to model the narrow-gauge lines in Queensland, South Australia, Tasmania and Western Australia where trains run on 3'6" track. Likewise it has a following in South Africa, Japan and to a small extent Taiwan and New Zealand which also use 3'6" tracks. See HOn3½ gauge.

== Related scales ==
In the same scale standard-gauge trains are modelled on 16.5 mm (0.65 in) gauge track, known as H0. Narrow-gauge trains are usually modelled on 9 mm (0.354 in) gauge track which is known as H0e and industrial minimum-gauge lines are modelled on 6.5 mm (0.256 in) gauge track known as H0f gauge. HOn3 is used to model 3 ft (914 mm) gauge railroads in the United States and uses a track gauge of 10.5 mm (0.413 in).
