= OO9 =

Model railway scale

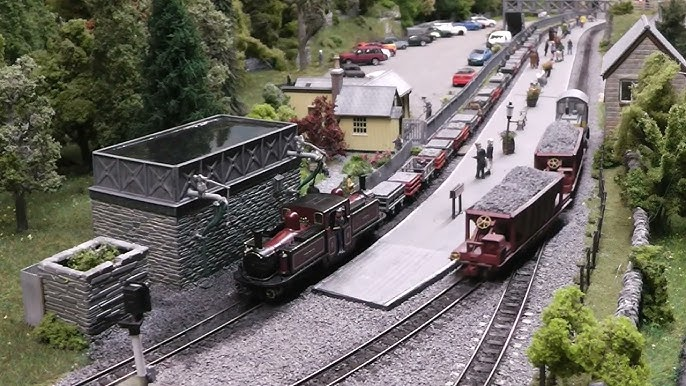
- "Tan-y-Bwlch", an OO9 model railway layout by Richard Holder.
- Scale: 4 mm to 1 ft (305 mm)
- Scale ratio: 1:76
- Model gauge: 9 mm (0.354 in)
- Prototype gauge: Narrow gauge, approx 2 ft 3 in (686 mm)

OO9, often also denoted as 009 or 00-9 and commonly pronounced as Double-Oh Nine, is a model railway scale and gauge combination of 4 mm scale and 9 mm (0.354 in) gauge tracks, which models a prototype track gauge of 2 ft 3 in (686 mm). It is a common choice in the United Kingdom for the modelling of narrow-gauge railways whose prototype gauges lie approximately between 2 ft (610 mm) and 2 ft 6 in (762 mm). The 9 mm (0.354 in) track gauge is used by N gauge model railways, a common commercial scale, which means that a selection of wheels, track, and mechanisms is readily available.

2 ft (610 mm) gauge railways were common in Britain, but the gauge implied by 9 mm at 4 mm scale - 2 ft 3 in (686 mm) - was quite rare - today only the Talyllyn and Corris railways in the UK use this gauge. However at 4 mm/foot scale, the differences to gauge required to correct this are barely perceptible by eye, and the wide use of 9 mm gauge in the modelling community is generally accepted to be an appropriate compromise. For example, the correct gauge for a 2-foot prototype would be 8 mm, but the resulting 1 mm difference from the OO9 standard is treated as insignificant by most modellers.

The 009 Society exists to connect modellers; it issues a monthly newsletter 009 News, commissions its own range of kits and provides a popular second hand resale service.

There is a growing range of commercially available ready to run support for OO9, with a number of manufacturers announcing ranges of products, and small manufacturers making limited runs of models from time to time.

In 2023 Peco launched a range of ready-to-run OO9 coaches and wagons, based on prototypes of the Lynton and Barnstaple Railway. This was followed in the March 2013 edition of Railway Modeller magazine, by Danish manufacturer Heljan announcing an OO9 locomotive based on the Lynton and Barnstaple Railway Manning Wardle 2-6-2Ts. Peco has since released ready-to-run carriages for the Glyn Valley Tramway (GVT), Ffestiniog Railway slate wagons and other general stock such as V tipper and four wheel flat wagons.

In July 2014, Bachmann announced a range of ready to run OO9 products, starting with a Baldwin Class 10-12-D locomotive and a number of wagons, primarily used by the British War Department during World War I. To date a range of Baldwin liveries have been released including models representing prototypes from the WHR, Ashover, Snailbeach, GVT and War Department. These have been launched alongside a range of wagons and a 'might have been' fictional Lynton and Barnstaple Baldwin locomotive named Sid. Further Bachmann models representing Quarry Hunslet locomotives, small industrial diesels alongside further coaches and wagons are expected to arrive within a couple of years after announcements in Bachmann catalogues. In 2015 Bachmann also introduced an OO9 line (marketed as "HO Scale on N-gauge track") based on the Skarloey Railway from its Thomas and Friends line. As part of its Skarloey line, Bachmann has introduced Skarloey and Rheneas products based on the Talyllyn Railway's two Fletcher, Jennings & Co. locomotives (Talyllyn and Dolgoch respectively) along with a Peter Sam model based on the Talyllyn's Edward Thomas. A third party industry emerged to offer replacement parts to convert the Bachmann locomotives into their real world inspirations, and Bachmann has announced plans to release modified tooling for a more realistic Talyllyn.

In late 2019 Peco announced a new joint venture with Japanese manufacturer Kato; together they planned to release models of the Ffestiniog Railway England and Double Fairlie locomotives. Peco also announced Ffestiniog rolling stock including bug boxes, quarrymen's coaches and larger bogie Bowsider coaches.

The modeller can also choose from a wide range of plastic, white metal and etched brass kit manufacturers such as Dundas Models, Meridian Models, Mercian Models, GEM, Rodney Stenning, Worsley works, Light Railway Stores, Nigel Lawton and others. Many of these companies attend narrow gauge focussed exhibitions - a diary of events is available to all on the OO9 society website (link below).

Some modellers also adapt models originally made for OO or utilise scratch building techniques. Many also use H0e equipment, which although built for 3.5mm scale, not 4mm, is often close enough to work alongside OO9.

Standard H0e 'bemo' style loop couplings are most often used. A slimmer alternative also with a loop is the Greenwich coupling which is compatible with these standard couplings and can be magnetically operated. Some modellers use chopper couplings or repurpose couplers made originally for other scales such as DG couplings. MicroTrains or Kadee couplings intended for N gauge can also been used.

== Related scales ==
Using N gauge 9 mm track to model narrow-gauge prototypes is also popular in HO scale model railways. In Europe, this is known as H0e while in the United States this is called HOn30 or HOn2 1/2. As the latter indicates, 9 mm in HO scale is 783 mm (30.8 in) in the theoretical prototype, closer to 2 ft 6 in (762 mm) gauge.

3 ft (914 mm) gauge lines (common in Ireland and the Isle of Man) are generally modelled in 4 mm scale but with 12 mm (0.472 in) gauge track, which is known as OOn3.

== Manufacturers ==
- Nigel Lawton 009 – Industrial narrow-gauge rolling stock kits and micro motors
- Dundas Models – Locomotive and rolling stock kits
- Peco – 009 narrow-gauge style track, rolling stock and accessories
- Worsley Works – Rolling stock and loco 'scratch aid' kits
- Bachmann Branchline – Locomotives, rolling stock and buildings
- Heljan – Locomotives
- Fourdees – Locomotives and rolling stock
- Brooks 3D Models - Locomotive and rolling stock kits
- Rapido Trains UK Locomotives and rolling stock
- Kato Precision Railroad Models Locomotives and track
- MiniBuilds Locomotive and rolling stock kits

== See also ==
- 009 Society UK 009 modelling society and publisher of the 009 NEWS newsletter.
- HOn30 gauge and HOe gauge narrow-gauge railways in HO scale on N (9 mm/0.65 in) gauge track in 1:87 scale ratio
- Rabbit warren layout
