= Scratch building =

Scale model creation from raw materials

Scratch building is the process of building a scale model "from scratch", i.e. from raw materials, rather than building it from a commercial kit, kitbashing or buying it pre-assembled.

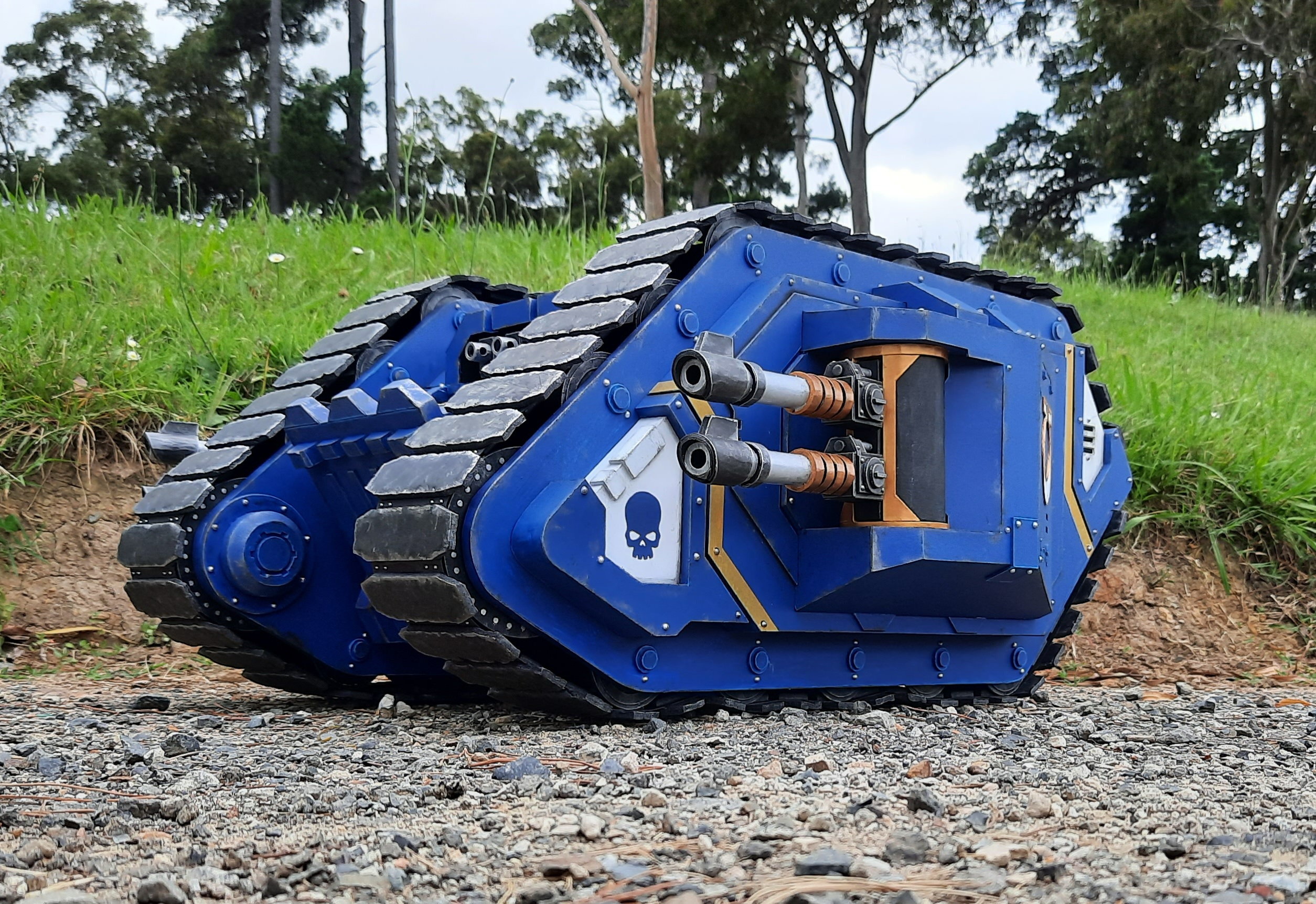
A scratch-built Warhammer 40,000 Land Raider in 1/18 scale utilizing paperboard and cardboard.

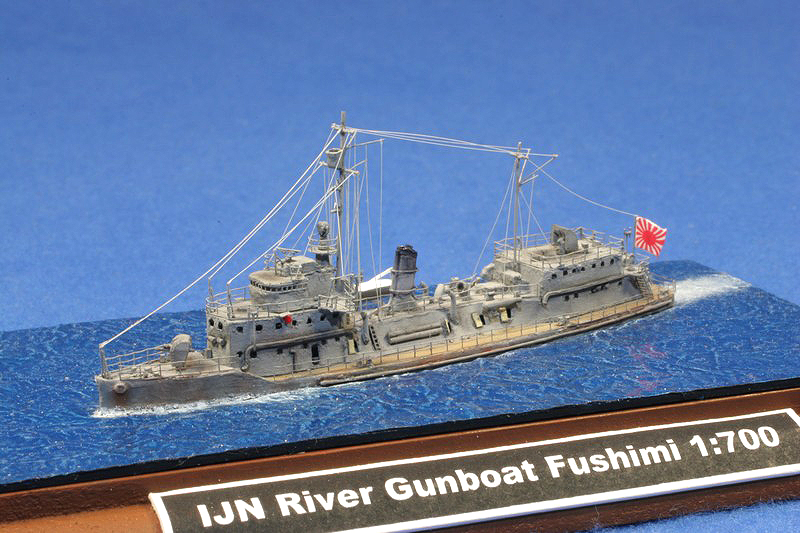
A 7cm long scratch-built model of 1/700 scale Japanese gunboat Fushimi (1939), built out of paper and copper wire.

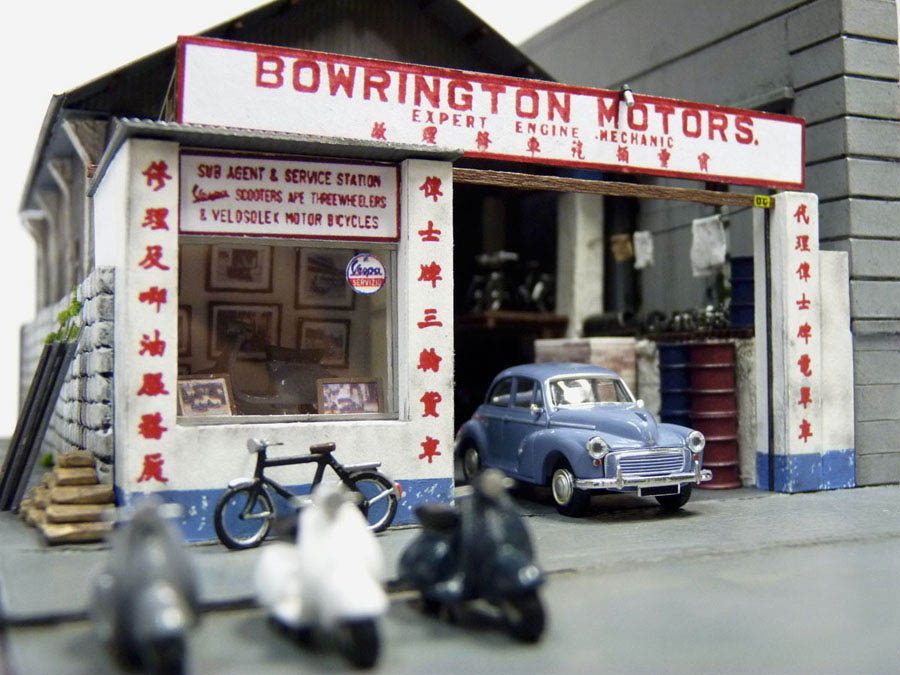
A scratch-built 1:87 scale model of an old Vespa garage in Causeway Bay, Hong Kong 1950s, mainly built out of Foamcore and plastic card.

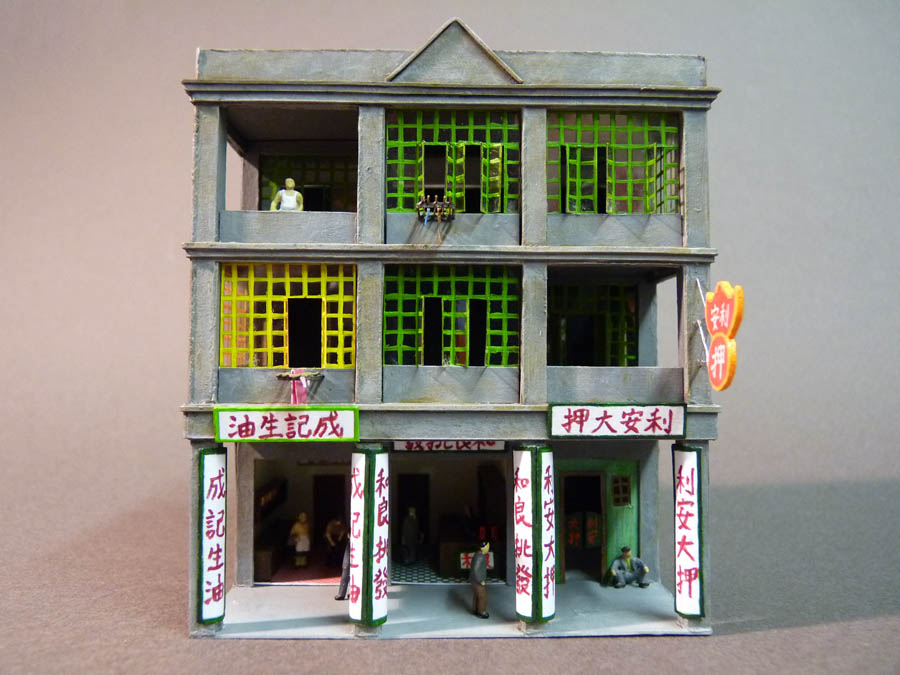
A scratch-built 1:150 model of Hong Kong's 'Tong Lau' tenement building.

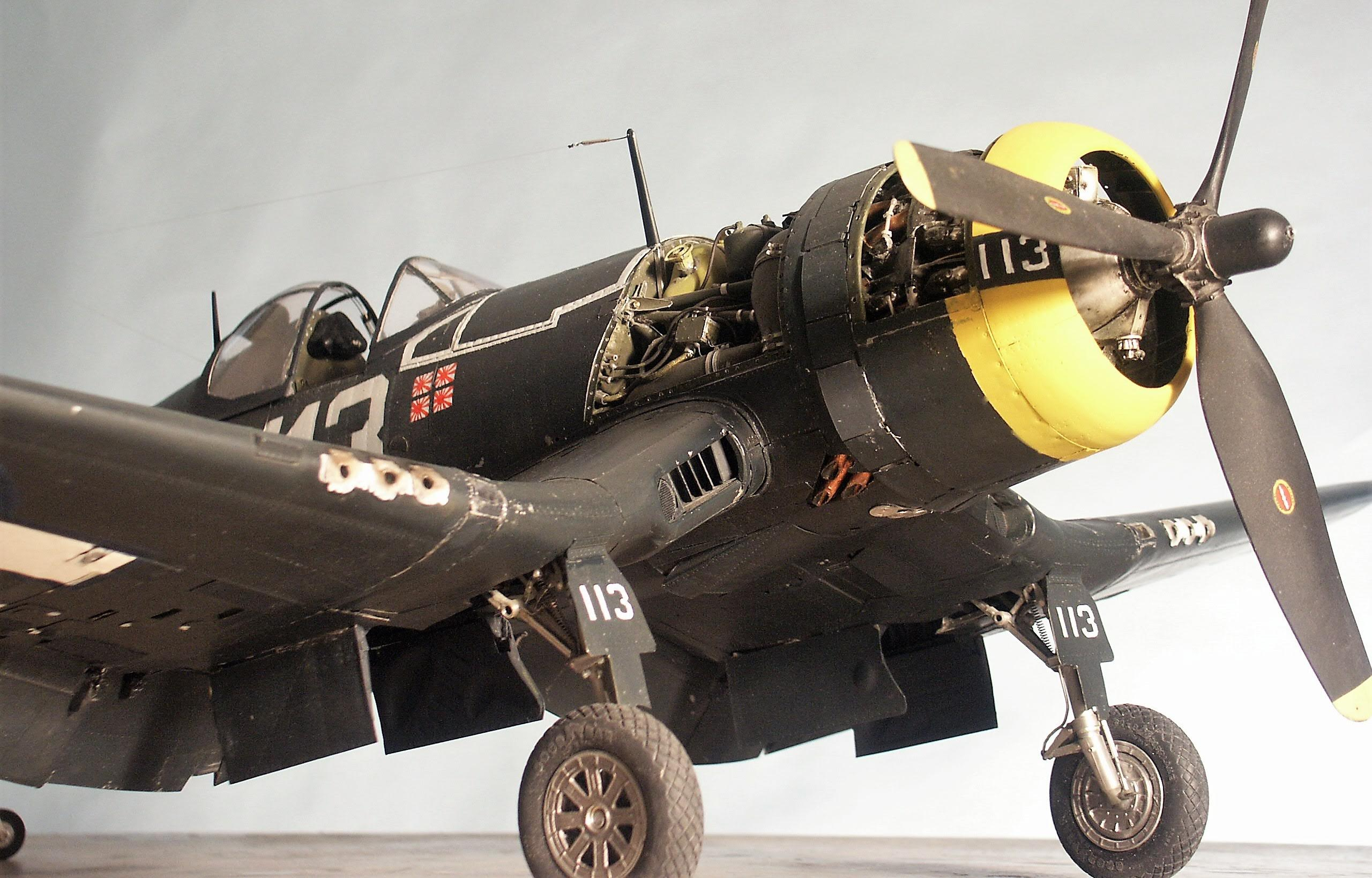
A scratch-built American Vought F4U Corsair 1:15 scale aluminum model by Guillermo Rojas Bazan.

Scratch building is easiest if original plans of the subject exist; however, many models have been built from photographs by measuring a known object in the photograph and extrapolating the rest of the dimensions. The necessary parts are then fashioned out of a suitable material, such as wood, plastic, plaster, clay, metal, polymer clay, or even paper, and then assembled. Some purists consider a model not to be truly scratchbuilt unless all of the parts were made from raw materials. However most modellers would consider a model including commercial detail parts as scratchbuilt. Scratchbuilding a new body onto an altered ready-to-run chassis is also acceptable.

== Motives ==
The reasons hobbyists scratchbuild may vary. Often a desired model is unavailable in kit form in the desired scale, or entirely non-existent. Sometimes the hobbyist may be dissatisfied with the accuracy or detail of kits that are available. Other times a hobbyist will opt to scratchbuild simply for the challenge. A hobbyist may also scratchbuild out of economy, as often the raw materials cost less than a packaged commercial kit.

== Techniques ==
Most hobbyists develop their skills by building kits, then progress to kitbashing, where various kits are combined to create a unique model before attempting to scratchbuild. Sometimes scratchbuilders utilize discarded parts of other models or toys, with or without modification, either in order to speed up the building process or to allow the process to continue in spite of certain parts being difficult to make. Some companies sell parts that are of little use to anyone but scratchbuilders.

== Building stock ==
Building stock, in whichever material, can be plain sheets, strips, bars, tubes, rods, or even structural shapes such as L or T girders. Stock can also be embossed or textured to replicate a certain prototype material (such as plastic sheet embossed with grooves to mimic a scale brick wall).

For example, to scratch-build a small board fence, the modeler could use plastic rod stock to form the vertical posts, then use plastic bar stock to form horizontal rails affixed to the posts, lay plastic strip stock vertically on the horizontal rails (perhaps 'distressed' with a wire brush to mimic wood grain, or by using thin strips of actual wood), trimming the top and bottoms of the strips to be even, adding details like nail holes (using a small pin), and then finishing and weathering (making a model look like it has been used via dust, dirt, stains, and wear).

== Method ==
There are as many ways of scratch-building models as there are modelers, but generally the modeler obtains plans of a prototype, or designs their own, transfers these plans to paper or other material as patterns (much easier since the arrival of household computer printers and copiers), and uses these patterns to cut, trim and affix the stock together to form the model. Finishing work (such as sanding and polishing, painting, weathering, distressing by forming dents and rust, dust, etc.) is done to complete the model and (hopefully) bring it to a lifelike state.
