= Rosebud Kitmaster =

- Product type: Railway model kits
- Current owner: Hornby (2007–pres.)
- Introduced: 1959; 67 years ago
- Previous owners: Rosebud Dolls Co. (1959–62); Airfix (1962–2006)

Rosebud Kitmaster is the brand name of a range of plastic assembly kits, manufactured in the United Kingdom by Rosebud Dolls Ltd of Raunds, Northamptonshire. Introduced from May 1959, the range rapidly expanded to include 34 models of railway locomotives and coaches in OO, HO and TT scales, and eventually, one motorcycle in 1:16 scale.

The assets of Rosebud Kitmaster were sold to Airfix Products Ltd in late 1962. Nine locomotives and the motorcycle were later re-issued under the Airfix brand. Airfix Products Ltd collapsed in 1982. The Rosebud Kitmaster and Airfix railway & Trackside ranges were sold to David Boyle of Dapol Model Railways and the tools were transferred to their premises in Winsford, Cheshire (later in Llangollen, Clwyd and now Gledridd Industrial Estate in Shropshire. The residual tooling of the Airfix company was taken over by Humbrol in 1986, but the company went down in August 2006. Hornby then acquired the Humbrol and Airfix brand names. Dapol Model Railways have subsequently re-introduced the Kitmaster name for their range of plastic construction kits and their "completely knocked down" range of coaches derived from Airfix and Mainline Railways tooling.

== Overview ==
The range comprised mainly British railway rolling stock but there were a few kits of other subjects. The range consisted of 34 kits of individual locomotives or carriages, a model of the Ariel Arrow motorcycle, the "Fireball XL5" rocket, parts to motorise the railway kits (using a motorised box wagon supplied pre-built, or a motor bogie) and three railway presentation sets:

- P1: 100 Years of British Steam - this included kits of Stephenson's Rocket, the Stirling 8' Single locomotive and a Coronation class locomotive in 00 scale.
- P2: Battle of Britain Set - this contained a Battle of Britain class locomotive and three BR Mark 1 coaches in 00 scale.
- P3: TT3 Royal Scot Set - this contained a Royal Scot class locomotive and four BR Mark 1 coaches in TT3 (3mm = 1 foot) scale.

All of the moulds for the kits produced by Rosebud Dolls Ltd under the Kitmaster name were sold to Airfix Products Ltd in 1962, and later in 1982 all of the surviving tools were sold to Dapol Model Railways. However, not all of the kits were passed over and several were destroyed by General Mills / Palitoy at the Glenfield warehouse where they had been stored following the liquidation of Airfix Products Ltd that year. As such, some Kitmaster kits are extremely collectable and can be valuable to a dedicated collector. Prices of unmade kits for the rarer models, such as the 00 gauge LMS Beyer-Garratt locomotive, can reach as much as £100.

Before its demise, the company announced the introduction of a number of kits that never knowingly entered production, including the LNER Flying Scotsman, Southern Railway Class USA Tank engine and Canadian National U-4A.

== Models ==
The OO/HO gauge models consisted of the following types; all OO scale unless shown as HO:

- Kit No 1 - Stephenson's Rocket
- Kit No 2 - BR Class 08 diesel shunter locomotive
- Kit No 3 - USA 4-4-0 Locomotive The General HO scale
- Kit No 4 - LMS Coronation Class locomotive Duchess of Gloucester
- Kit No 5 - SR 4-4-0 Schools Class locomotive Harrow
- Kit No 6 - Lancashire & Yorkshire 0-4-0 saddle tank "pug" locomotive
- Kit No 7 - GWR Prairie Tank locomotive
- Kit No 8 - Italian 0-6-0 tank locomotive
- Kit No 9 - Stirling 8 ft Single locomotive
- Kit No 10 - English Electric Deltic Prototype diesel locomotive
- Kit No 11 - SR 4-6-2 Battle of Britain Class locomotive Biggin Hill
- Kit No 12 - Swiss Crocodile electric locomotive
- Kit No 13 - BR Standard Mk1 Corridor Composite Coach (in Maroon or Green)
- Kit No 14 - BR Standard Mk1 Corridor or Open 2nd Coach (in Maroon or Green)
- Kit No 15 - BR Standard Mk1 Corridor Brake 2nd Coach (in Maroon or Green)
- Kit No 19 - German 2-6-2 locomotive "Baureihe 23" class 23
- Kit No 22 - BR Standard 2-10-0 9F locomotive Evening Star (with number transfers for three other members of the class that were black and unnamed, so one of four possible models in one kit)
- Kit No 23 - SNCF Class 241P 'Mountain' locomotive
- Kit No 24 - GWR 4-4-0 locomotive City of Truro
- Kit No 25 - LMS 2-6-0+0-6-2 Beyer-Garratt Locomotive
- Kit No 26 - 0-6-0ST "Austerity" class J94
- Kit No 27 - German DB B4yge Coach - HO scale
- Kit No 28 - BR Standard Mk1 Restaurant 1st Coach with interior (in Maroon or Green)
- Kit No 29 - French SNCF A9myfi "INOX" stainless steel coach - HO scale
- Kit No 30 - BR 2-6-0 Standard Class 4 'Mogul'
- Kit No 31 - Midland Blue Pullman power car
- Kit No 32 - Midland Blue Pullman kitchen car
- Kit No 33 - Midland Blue Pullman parlour car
- Kit No 34 - New York Central 'Hudson' 4-6-4 steam locomotive - HO scale

The TT gauge models were: -

- Kit No 16 - LMS 4-6-0 locomotive Royal Scot
- Kit No 17 - BR Standard Mk1 Corridor Brake 2nd Coach (in Maroon or Green)
- Kit No 18 - BR Standard Mk1 Corridor Composite Coach (in Maroon or Green)
- Kit No 20 - BR Standard Mk1 Corridor or Open 2nd Coach (in Maroon or Green)
- Kit No 21 - BR Standard Mk1 Restaurant 1st Coach with interior (in Maroon or Green)

The motorisation units were:

- KM1 - Motorised BR Mk1 bogie - OO Scale - designed to be fitted inside Kit No.15, the BR Mk1 Brake Second, to push passenger locomotives.
- KM2 - Motorised Box Van - OO scale -An RB3 Refrigerated Van which could be marshalled behind freight locomotives in order to push them along.
- KM3 - Motorised BR Mk1 bogie - TT scale - This was shown in the 1961 catalogue and reviewed in a contemporary issue of Railway Modeller magazine, but never entered large-scale production.

The final model released by Rosebud Kitmaster Ltd, in their packaging, was the motorcycle:

- Kit No 60 - Ariel Arrow Super Sports model 1960 in 1/16th scale

A subsequent model, manufactured by the Hermes Supply Company (a subsidiary of Airfix) was marketed as "your Kitmaster model" in 1963:

- No kit number - Fireball XL5 in 1/100 scale

The Hermes Supply Co also supplied five kits from remaindered Kitmaster stock in plain packaging to fulfil a Nabisco promotion which ran on Shredded Wheat packets during early 1963. These were:

- Kit No 2 - BR Class 08 diesel shunter locomotive
- Kit No 10 - English Electric Deltic Prototype diesel locomotive
- Kit No 15 - BR Standard Mk1 Corridor Brake 2nd Coach (in Maroon or Green)
- Kit No 22 - BR Standard 2-10-0 9F locomotive Evening Star
- Kit No 28 - BR Standard Mk1 Restaurant 1st Coach with interior (in Maroon or Green)

== Bibliography ==
- Knight, Stephen (1999). Let's Stick Together: An Appreciation of Kitmaster and Airfix Railway Kits. Clophill: Irwell Press. ISBN 1-871608-90-2.
- Knight, Stephen (2012). Let's Stick A Little Bit More: A further Appreciation of vintage plastic kits. Clophill: Irwell Press. ISBN 978-1-906919-49-8.
