= LNER Class J94 =

Class of steam locomotives

LNER Class J94 ex-WD Hunslet Austerity 0-6-0ST
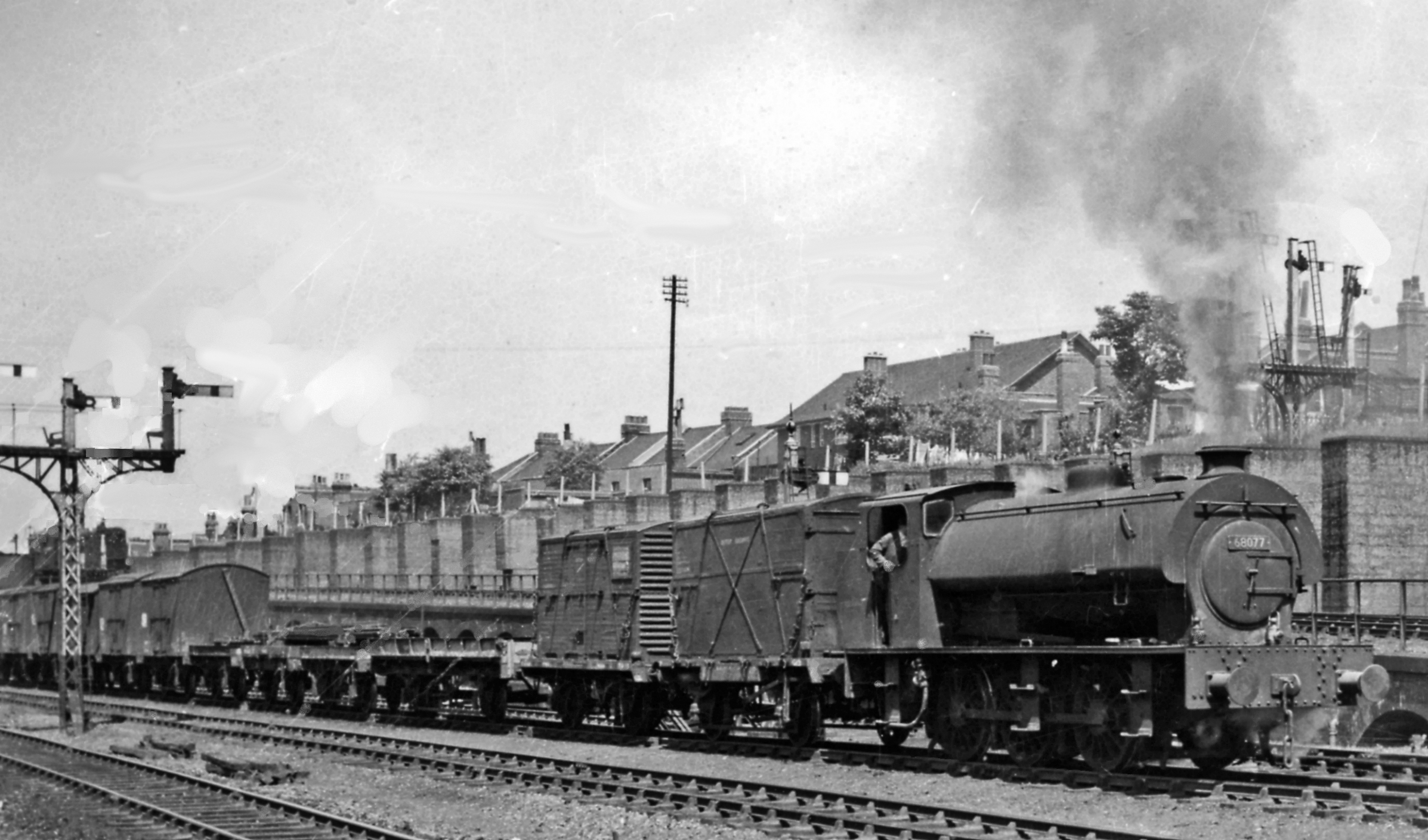
- Up freight at Harringay West, with ex-WD 0-6-0ST, ex-LNER Class J94
Type and origin
- Power type: Steam
- Builder: Hunslet Engine Company
- Build date: Purchased in 1946
- Total produced: 75
Specifications
- Configuration
  - Whyte: 0-6-0ST
  - UIC: Cn t
- Gauge: 4 ft 8 1/2 in (1,435 mm) standard gauge
- Driver dia.: 4 ft 3 in (1.295 m)
- Minimum curve: 180 ft (54.86 m)
- Wheelbase: 11 ft 0 in (3.35 m)
- Length: 30 ft 4 in (9.25 m)
- Axle load: 13.35 long tons (13.56 t; 14.95 short tons)
- Loco weight: 48.25 long tons (49.02 t; 54.04 short tons)
- Fuel type: Coal
- Fuel capacity: 2.25 long tons (2.29 t; 2.52 short tons)
- Water cap.: 1,200 imp gal (5,500 L; 1,400 US gal)
- Firebox
  - Grate area: 16.8 sq ft (1.56 m^{2})
- Boiler: Round top outer firebox, 181 tubes, copper or steel inner firebox
- Boiler pressure: 170 psi (1.17 MPa)
- Heating surface
  - Firebox: 88 sq ft (8.2 m^{2})
  - Tubes: 873 sq ft (81.1 m^{2})
- Superheater: None
- Cylinders: Two, inside
- Cylinder size: 18 in × 26 in (457 mm × 660 mm)
- Valve gear: Stephenson
- Valve type: Slide valves
Performance figures
- Tractive effort: 23,870 lbf (106.18 kN)
Career
- Power class: BR: 4F
- Nicknames: Austerity
- Retired: 1960–1967
- Disposition: Two preserved, remainder scrapped

The London and North Eastern Railway (LNER) J94 Class is a class of steam locomotive that was formed when 75 former "Austerity" 0-6-0STs were purchased by the LNER in 1946 from the War Department.

== Overview ==
The LNER had trials with one in November 1945 and bought 75 of them in 1946, numbering them 8006-80. All entered British Railways (BR) service in 1948. BR added 60000 to their numbers so they became 68006-80, and classified them 4F.

They were used for shunting in docks, and other similar work where their short wheelbase meant they could negotiate sharp curves. They were used on the Cromford and High Peak Railway in Derbyshire, where they displaced the ex-North London Railway Class 75 class 2F 0-6-0Ts.

They were withdrawn between 1960 and 1967. A few were sold into industrial use with the National Coal Board (who had several other Austerities) and others.

== Stock list ==
Numbers			Builder	Date built	Withdrawn	Notes
LNER	BR	WD	Builder	Date built	Withdrawn	Notes
8006	68006	5094, 75094	Hudswell Clarke	1944	1967	Used on C&HPR
8007	68007	5097, 75097	Hudswell Clarke	1944	1962	
8008	68008	5101, 75101	Hunslet	1944	1963	
8009	68009	5108, 75108	Hunslet	1944	1962	
8010	68010	5117, 75117	Hunslet	1944	1965	
8011	68011	5119, 75119	Hunslet	1944	1965	
8012	68012	5124, 75124	Hunslet	1944	1967	Used on C&HPR
8013	68013	5125, 75125	Hunslet	1944	1965	
8014	68014	5134, 75134	Hunslet	1944	1964	
8015	68015	75139	Hunslet	1944	1963	
8016	68016	75148	Hunslet	1944	1964	
8017	68017	75149	Hunslet	1944	1962	
8018	68018	5150, 75150	Bagnall	1944	1962	
8019	68019	5153, 75153	Bagnall	1944	1964	
8020	68020	75164	Bagnall	1944	1963	Sold to NCB
8021	68021	5183, 75183	Robert Stephenson and Hawthorns	1944	1963	
8022	68022	5184, 75184	Robert Stephenson & Hawthorne	1944	1960	
8023	68023	5190, 75190	Robert Stephenson & Hawthorne	1944	1965	
8024	68024	71509	Robert Stephenson & Hawthorne	1944	1964	
8025	68025	71498	Hudswell Clarke	1944	1967	
8026	68026	71506	Hudswell Clarke	1945	1961	
8027	68027	71440	Hunslet	1945	1960	
8028	68028	71440	Hunslet	1945	1963	
8029	68029	71451	Hunslet	1945	1963	
8030	68030	71440	Hunslet	1945	1962	
8031	68031	75272	Robert Stephenson & Hawthorne	1945	1963	
8032	68032	75281	Robert Stephenson & Hawthorne	1945	1964	
8033	68033	75287	Robert Stephenson & Hawthorne	1945	1963	Sold into industrial use
8034	68034	75297	Vulcan Foundry	1945	1962	
8035	68035	75320	Vulcan Foundry	1945	1963	
8036	68036	75321	Vulcan Foundry	1945	1964	
8037	68037	75322	Vulcan Foundry	1945	1965	
8038	68038	75323	Vulcan Foundry	1945	1963	
8039	68039	75324	Vulcan Foundry	1945	1963	
8040	68040	75325	Vulcan Foundry	1945	1963	
8041	68041	75326	Vulcan Foundry	1945	1963	
8042	68042	75327	Vulcan Foundry	1945	1963	
8043	68043	75328	Vulcan Foundry	1945	1965	
8044	68044	75329	Vulcan Foundry	1945	1962	
8045	68045	75330	Vulcan Foundry	1945	1963	
8046	68046	75331	Vulcan Foundry	1945	1964	
8047	68047	75258	Bagnall	1945	1965	
8048	68048	75259	Bagnall	1945	1962	
8049	68049	75260	Bagnall	1945	1963	
8050	68050	75261	Bagnall	1945	1964	Sold to NCB
8051	68051	75262	Bagnall	1945	1964	
8052	68052	75263	Bagnall	1945	1962	
8053	68053	75265	Bagnall	1945	1965	
8054	68054	75266	Bagnall	1945	1964	
8055	68055	75267	Bagnall	1945	1963	
8056	68056	75268	Bagnall	1945	1963	
8057	68057	75269	Bagnall	1945	1962	
8058	68058	75270	Bagnall	1945	1962	
8059	68059	75271	Bagnall	1945	1963	
8060	68060	71467	Hudswell Clarke	1945	1965	
8061	68061	71468	Hudswell Clarke	1945	1963	
8062	68062	71468	Hudswell Clarke	1945	1965	
8063	68063	71469	Hudswell Clarke	1945	1962	
8063	68063	71480	Hudswell Clarke	1945	1962	
8064	68064	71471	Hudswell Clarke	1945	1962	
8065	68065	71473	Hudswell Clarke	1945	1962	
8066	68066	71474	Hudswell Clarke	1945	1962	
8067	68067	71475	Hudswell Clarke	1945	1963	Sold to NCB
8068	68068	71476	Hudswell Clarke	1946	1965	
8069	68069	71477	Hudswell Clarke	1946	1962	
8070	68070	71486	Robert Stephenson & Hawthorne	1945	1963	Sold for Industrial use
8071	68071	71532	Barclay	1945	1963	
8072	68072	71533	Barclay	1945	1960	
8073	68073	71534	Barclay	1945	1961	
8074	68074	71535	Barclay	1945	1962	
8075	68075	(71536)	Barclay	1945	1962	
8076	68076	(71462)	Barclay	1946	1960	
8077	68077	(71466)	Barclay	1946	1962	Sold to NCB; Preserved on K&WVR
8078	68078	(71463)	Barclay	1946	1963	Sold to Derek Crouch Ltd; Preserved
8079	68079	(71464)	Barclay	1946	1966	
8080	68080	(71465)	Barclay	1946	1961	

== Preservation ==
Two, BR Nos 68077 and 68078, have been preserved. In addition a large number of Austerities that were used in industry have survived to preservation. Several of these have been disguised as BR locomotives. Enthusiasts often refer to them by the nickname "Buckets".

=== LNER/BR J94s ===
Numbers		Location	Condition
LNER	BR	Location	Condition
8077	68077	Spa Valley Railway	Undergoing overhaul
8078	68078	Private site in Kent	Under restoration

=== Locomotives disguised as J94s ===
Numbers		Builder	Works No.	Date
LNER	BR	Builder	Works No.	Date
	68005	RSH	7169	1945
	68006	Hunslet	3192	1944
	68009	Hunslet	3825	1954
	68012	W.G.Bagnall	2746	1944
	68012	Hunslet	3193/3887	1944
	68030	Hunslet	3777	1952
	68067	Hudswell Clarke	1752	1943
	68072	Vulcan	5309	1945
	68081	Hunslet	2855	1943

== Models ==
The erstwhile Rosebud Kitmaster company produced an unpowered polystyrene injection moulded model kit for 00 gauge, which went on sale in Spring 1961. In early 1963 the Kitmaster brand was sold by its parent company (Rosebud Dolls) to Airfix, who transferred the moulding tools to their own factory; they re-introduced some of the former Kitmaster range, including this locomotive. The tool (for this model) was destroyed in a fire at the premises of Dapol Model Railways Ltd in Winsford Cheshire. Dapol were thus unable to produce further kits after their first two production runs totalling 4000 kits after acquisition of the former Airfix moulds.
