= British Rail DP1 =

British prototype diesel engine

English Electric DELTIC prototype
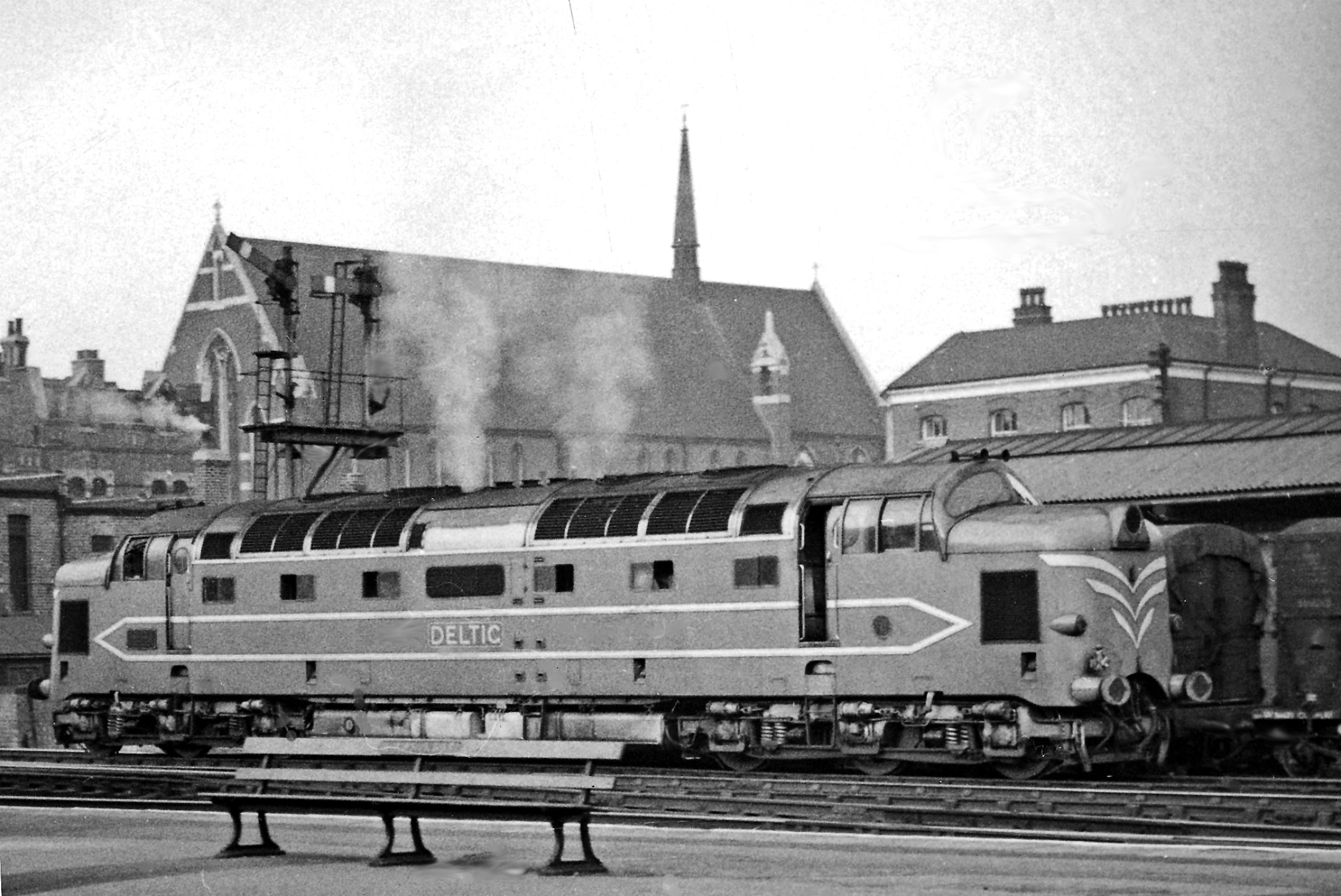
- DP1 at Harringay station in 1959 in blue livery.
Type and origin
- Power type: Diesel-electric
- Builder: English Electric at Dick, Kerr & Co Works, Preston
- Serial number: EE: 2003
- Build date: 1955
Specifications
- Configuration
  - UIC: Co′Co′
- Gauge: 4 ft 8 1/2 in (1,435 mm) standard gauge
- Wheel diameter: 3 ft 7 in (1,092 mm)
- Pivot centres: 44 ft (13 m)
- Length
  - Over beams: 66 ft (20 m)
- Width: 8 ft 9.5 in (2.680 m)
- Height: 12 ft 10.5 in (3.924 m)
- Loco weight: 106 long tons (108 t; 119 short tons)
- Fuel capacity: 800 imp gal (3,600 L; 960 US gal)
- Prime mover: 2 x Napier Deltic E158 D18-12
- Engine type: opposed piston two-stroke diesel
- Generator: 2 x 1100 kW
- Traction motors: 6 x EE 526/A
- Cylinders: 2 x 18
- Transmission: Diesel electric
- Train heating: Stone-Vapor/Clarkson steam generator
Performance figures
- Maximum speed: 90 mph (140 km/h); 106 mph (171 km/h) from 1956
- Power output: 3,300 hp (2,500 kW)
- Tractive effort: 90 mph gearing: 60,000 lbf (266.89 kN); 106 mph gearing: 52,500 lbf (233.53 kN)
Career
- Operators: British Railways
- Power class: Type 5
- Numbers: DP1
- Official name: Deltic
- Retired: March 1961
- Disposition: Preserved at the National Railway Museum Shildon

English Electric DP1, commonly known as Deltic, is a prototype 3,300 hp (2,500 kW) demonstrator locomotive employing two Napier Deltic engines, built by English Electric in 1955.

The high power of the locomotive at an acceptably low axleload resulted in 22 similar locomotives being ordered by British Railways for use on East Coast Main Line express passenger services, the serial production of which became the British Rail Class 55.

== Background and design ==
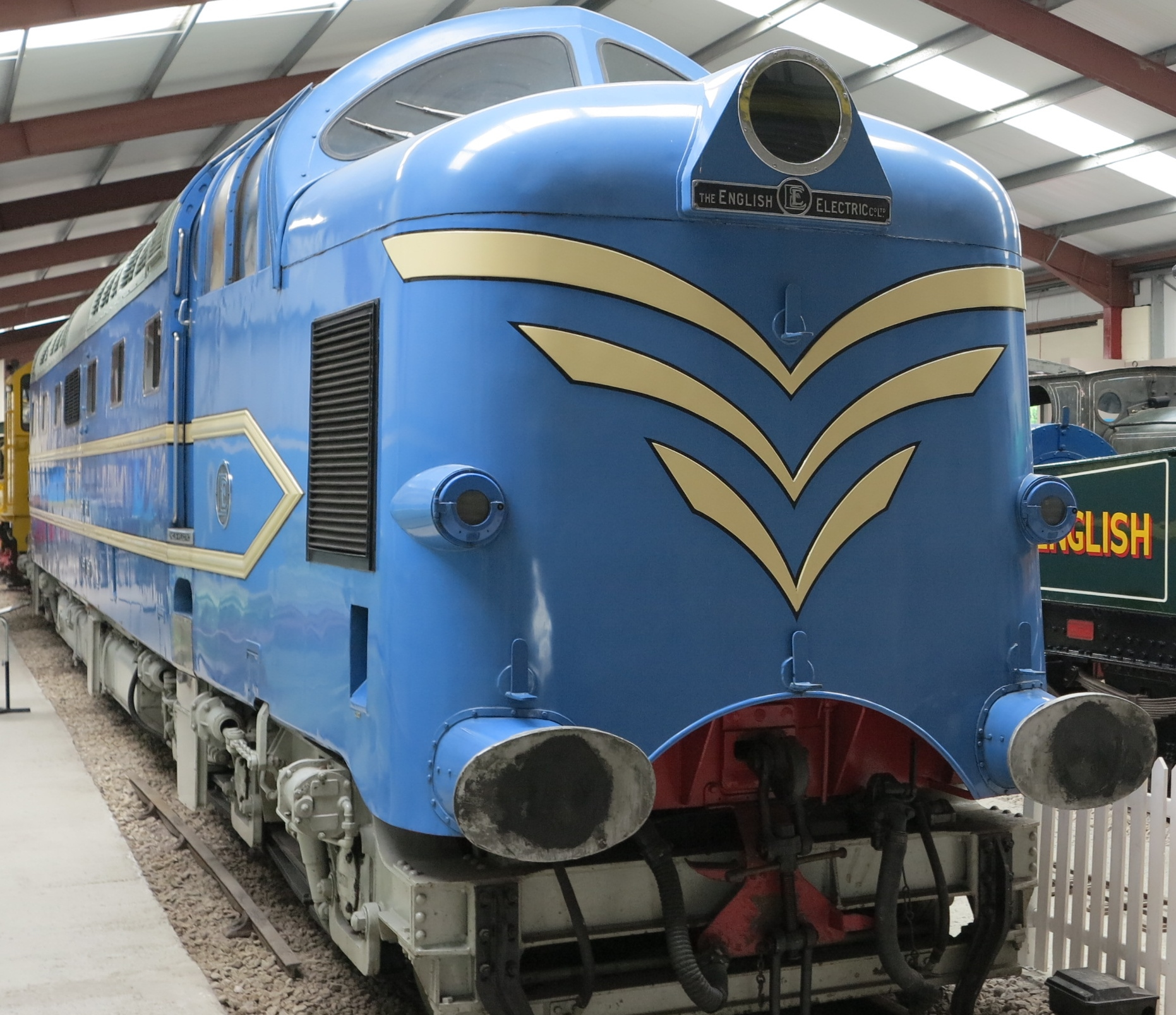
Frontage

The English Electric company, which had absorbed the aeroengine-maker D. Napier & Son into its group at the instruction of the Ministry of Aircraft Production in 1942, was a major builder of diesel and electric locomotives. George Nelson, the chairman of English Electric, together with his son, also called George, saw the potential of Napier's Deltic engine for rail traction and in 1954–1955 built a demonstrator at its Dick, Kerr works in Preston. Officially numbered DP1, (Note: DP1, "Diesel Prototype 1"; this designation was never carried on the locomotive.) its internal project title was Enterprise, and it was intended that the locomotive would carry that name. However, in 1954, before completion, Hudswell Clarke announced a range of small diesel-mechanical locomotives using the same name. (Note: For the Hudswell Clarke engine 'Enterprise' see Applications of the Paxman Hi-Dyne engine. Plans to name DP1 Enterprise never came to fruition.) After initial trials in 1955, the locomotive received the word Deltic in large cream capital letters on its sides, and the name became synonymous with the locomotive.

Long aluminium beadings on the sides were painted cream, a visual device to make the locomotive's high sides appear more slender and add to the impression of speed. Three curved chevrons on each nose, in the same cream, added to that effect. To British eyes, the locomotive's bulldog nose styling was reminiscent of American locomotives, such as the EMD E-unit or ALCO PA designs (partly because English Electric initially planned to offer the type for export), with high noses and small, somewhat swept-back cab windows set behind them. To add to the American look of the locomotive, a large headlight was to have been fitted to each nose (the lights were never installed but would have been of the rotating 'Mars Light' type as fitted to North American locomotives of the era). Two 18-cylinder Deltic engines were fitted, derated from the 1,750 horsepower (1.3 MW) of the marine engines used in minesweepers to 1,650 horsepower (1.2 MW) each, generating 3,300 horsepower (2.5 MW) total. This derating reduced the stress on the engines, thereby increasing the service life and length of time between overhauls.

== Service and testing ==
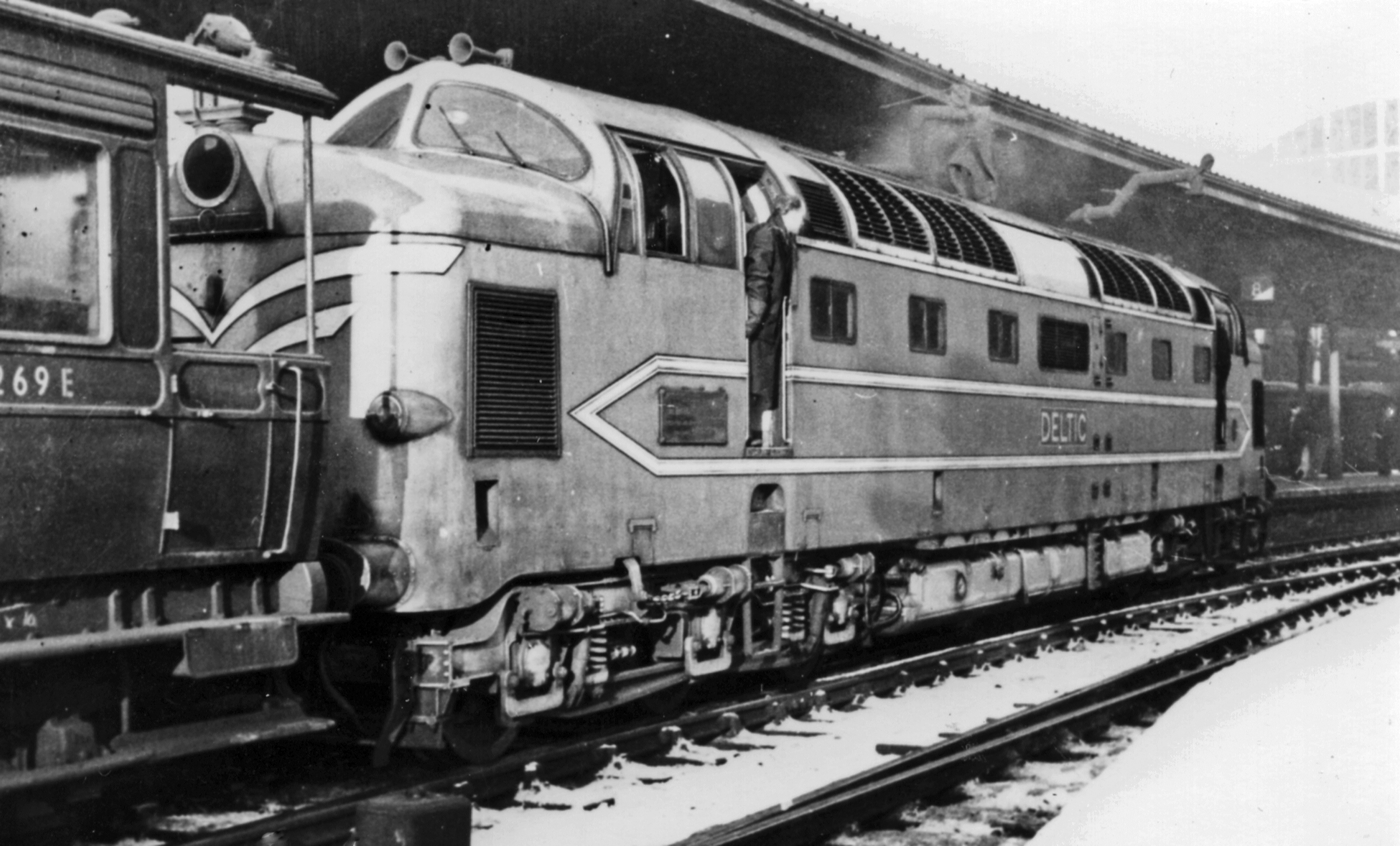
DP1 on test at Newcastle Central in 1959

The locomotive first saw service on the London Midland Region of British Railways in 1955, generally operating fast London to Liverpool freight trains; it was withdrawn and after modifications re-entered services in 1956. Tests were carried out on the Settle to Carlisle line in August/September 1956, (Note: Tests on the Settle Carlisle line using two mobile testing units and a dynamometer car were published in the British Transport Commission Test Bulletin No.19.) after which it operated passenger trains, The Shamrock and The Merseyside Express, between London Euston and Liverpool Lime Street, followed by London-Carlisle trains, and in 1957, returning to London-Liverpool trains. The region's chief mechanical and electrical engineer, J.F. Harrison, rejected the design, believing high-speed engines (i.e. 1500 rpm) unsuitable for railway applications. (Note: The West Coast Main Line was subsequently electrified, starting in 1959.)

In 1957, Gerry Fiennes, the line traffic manager on the former Great Northern route out of London King's Cross station, was seeking high power locomotives to run services on the East Coast Main Line, having found the 2000 hp English Electric type 4 locomotives produced under the 1955 modernisation plan lacking sufficient power for his planned timings; as a consequence he proposed using 'Deltic' type locomotives on the line. Objections to the order included those arising from: a limited permitted top speed due to the mass of the locomotive; the potential for the order to delay a proposed (1957) electrification scheme of the line; as well as the size which required modifications to the King's Cross platforms. An order was placed in 1959 for 22 Class 55s to replace 55 steam locomotives.

== Preservation ==
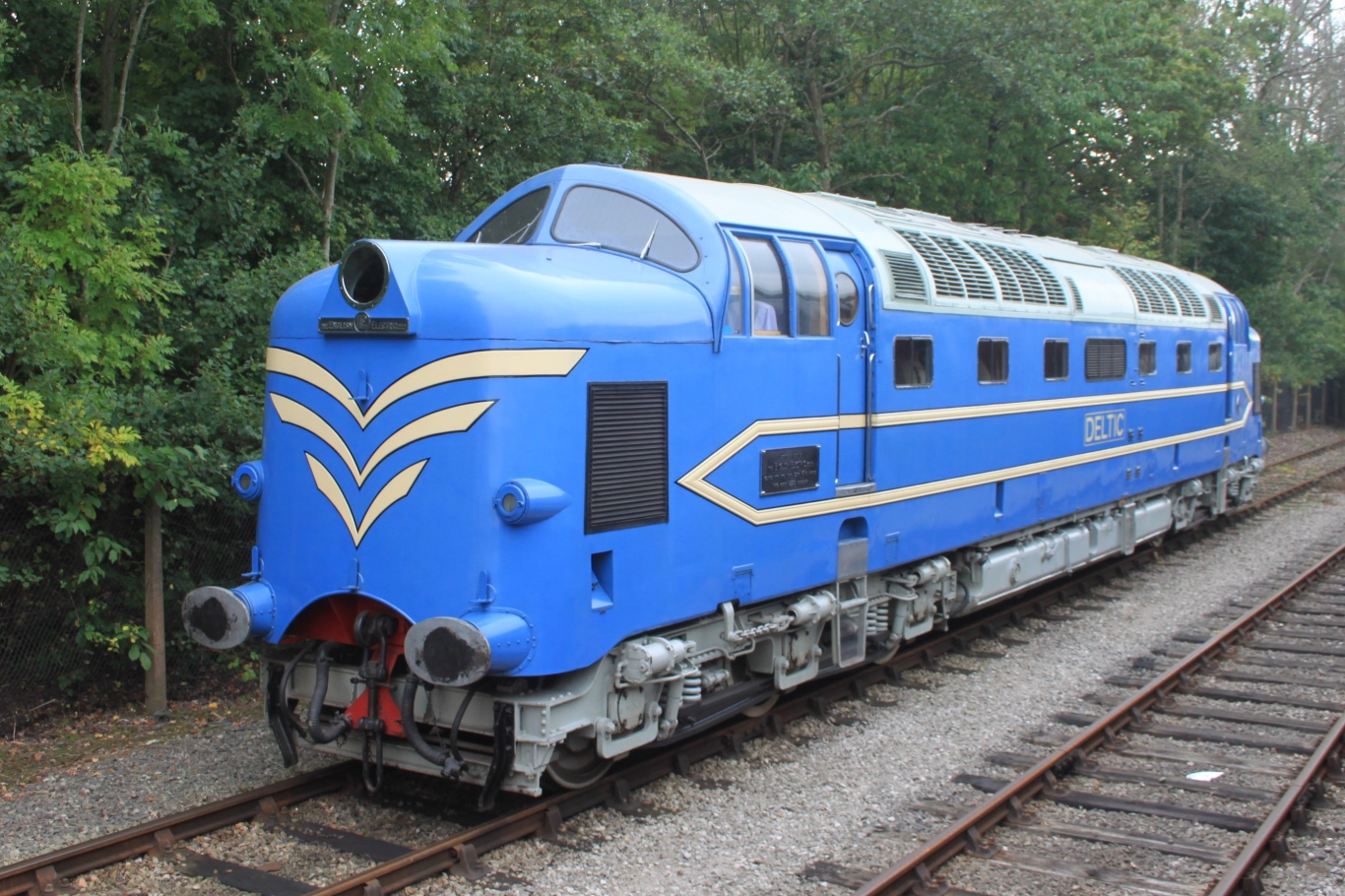
DP1 at the Ribble Steam Railway in 2015

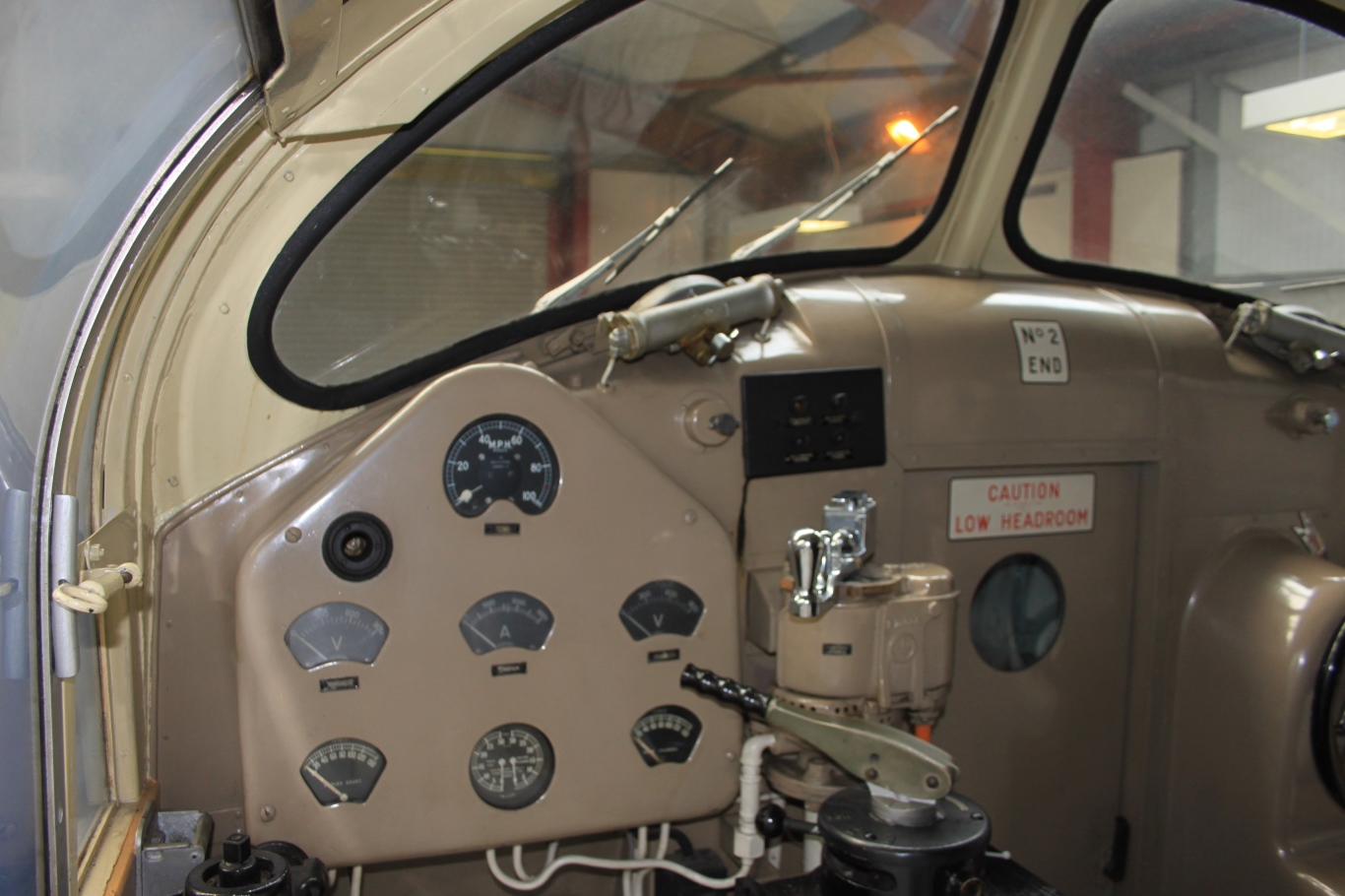
Driving position of DP1

DP1 was in service until 24 November 1960 when a severe oil leak in one of the engines was discovered. The locomotive was sent to English Electric Company's Works at Newton-le-Willows, Lancashire the next day for repair. However no repairs were sanctioned and the locomotive was withdrawn from service in March 1961 having completed 450,000 miles (720,000 kilometres). Plans to test it in Canada fell through, and the locomotive was donated in April 1963 to the Science Museum, South Kensington and placed on public display.

After 30 years at the Science Museum, it was transferred to the National Railway Museum, York in October 1993. About 11 years later it was moved north to the National Railway Museum Shildon, County Durham in July 2004. In August 2012 it was loaned to The Ribble Steam Railway in Preston, Lancashire, which is barely a mile away from where it was originally built, returning to Shildon in October 2015 where it remains as of July 2026.

Restoring the two Deltic engines installed in DP1 to running condition is not feasible. The engines (Type E158, D18-12) although similar, differ from those used in British Rail Class 55 locomotives (Type E169, D18-25B). Aside from the original issue with the severe oil leak in the phasing gear cover, significant engine components were removed for use as spare parts for the Royal Navy prior to DP1 being donated to the Science Museum as the locomotive was not owned by British Railways.

== Models ==
The Kitmaster company produced an unpowered polystyrene injection moulded model kit for OO gauge. In late 1962, the Kitmaster brand was sold by its parent company (Rosebud Dolls) to Airfix, who did not release model kits of this locomotive. In time, the Airfix tools passed on to Dapol who rediscovered the moulding tools and have since produced the model kit.

In 2007 model manufacturer Bachmann Branchline and the National Railway Museum announced the release of an OO gauge model of the DP1 for sale at the NRM Shop. Bachmann used laser-scanning (see 3D scanner) of the machine at the National Railway Museum Shildon to collect dimensional data of the locomotive. The model was praised for its attention to fine detail and smooth and powerful running. The model was produced in a limited edition of 3,000 items in total. 500 were supplied with a display plinth and a Merseyside Express headboard. Bachmann released a British N gauge model under the Graham Farish brand in 2010.

In February 2023 Hornby announced a new diecast Dublo tooling in OO gauge of the Deltic prototype locomotive, English Electric DP1 'Deltic', fitted with sound (R30297TXS).

== See also ==
- British Rail DP2, a later prototype, with a single English Electric 16CSVT engine of 2,700 hp
