= Rabbit warren layout =

Model railway layout

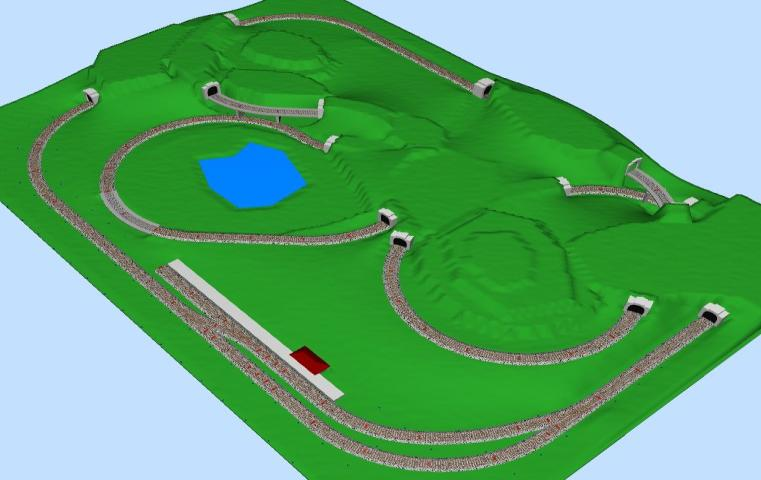

A rabbit warren layout is a model railway layout. A group of designs, more than a single constructed layout, rabbit warrens provide a display of continuously moving trains that appear to pop in and out of tunnels, seemingly randomly.

The rabbit warren design has a number of key, defining features:

- Continuous running in a loop
- Tight radius horseshoe curves
- Much of the track is hidden by tunnels, with many openings.
- Climbing to more than one level, often by spiral tunnels, permits tracks to cross over each other.

They are based on a single running loop, although twisted into overlapping curves. The baseboard is small, typically 4 by 2 feet (1.22 m × 0.61 m), but a long running line fits in, owing to the curves. Their purpose is to show a continuously moving train, lurching from side to side across reverse curves, with unpredictable re-appearances from the tunnel mouths. Points are few, a single decorative siding, or a passing loop to allow two trains to be run in turn. Some layouts in the 1970s used the early transistorised control circuits then becoming available to run automatically, switching between trains as each entered the loop.

== Origins ==
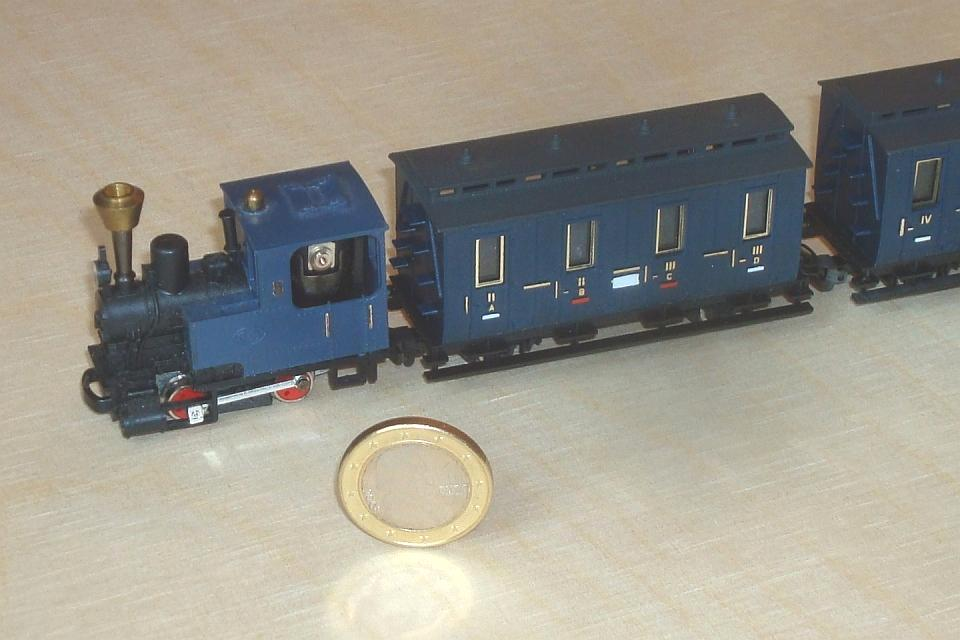
Typical Egger-bahn stock for H0e gauge

The rabbit warren was invented, or at least given its first UK prominence, by C. J. Freezer, long-term editor of Railway Modeller magazine.

Little trains dodge in and out of the tunnels like rabbits in a warren!

Rabbit warrens began their popularity in the mid-1960s, with the new H0e gauge narrow gauge models from Egger-bahn and later Jouef / Playcraft. These modelled the style of 600 mm Decauville or feldbahn types, although their scale gauge was closer to 750 mm gauge. Owing to the limitations of the model bodies and the mechanisms available, some oversizing of the frame spacing and gauge was needed. (Note: Something similar, although in reverse, had led to the oversized bodies of British 16.5 mm gauge models, leading to OO scale rather than H0.)

As these British layouts assumed the larger 00 scale of 4 mm to the foot (1:76.2), rather than H0's 1:87, the oversized locomotive bodies were now closer to scale size for the gauge. The coaching stock though had a 'miniature railway', rather than narrow-gauge, look to them, accentuated by the toast-rack designs of some open stock.

Rabbit warrens were almost entirely H0e or 00-9. Their small dimensions and tight curves required a narrow gauge. Narrow gauge models with short wheelbases were needed to negotiate them. Larger motors than standard gauge models were needed to climb the spirals.

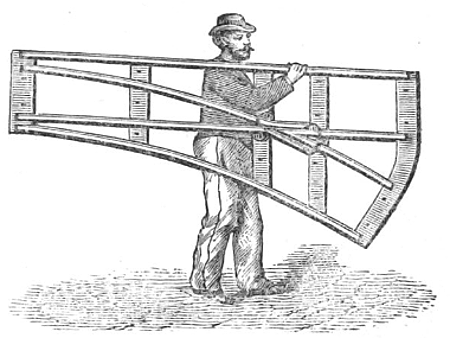
Installing original Decauville track

Decauville railways were already noted for their tight radius curves and the 'train set' nature of their installation as panels. The models exploited this with the sharpest radii of curves. Egger-bahn offered a 6 inches (150 mm) minimum radius, in contrast to the usual 9 inches (230 mm) for the later 00-9 and N gauge model railways. Although 'serious' representational 00-9 modelling had been in the UK since the 1940s with P.D. Hancock's Craig & Mertonford Railway, these were the first commercial ready-to-run narrow gauge models available. Unlike the few scratch-built models with their generous hand-made wheelbase, the tiny, short 0-4-0 chassis from Egger-bahn could run reasonably well on the steep tight curves of the rabbit.

Other makers, such as Minitrains also offered HOn30 models in US appearance, particularly a Baldwin 0-4-0ST. Being equally short, these too became popular for rabbits.

A number of rabbit warrens continued through the 1970s. The Far Tottering and Oysterperch, modelled on Rowland Emett's Far Tottering and Oyster Creek Railway featured in Railway Modeller, as did a number of Santa-themed Christmas layouts. Meanderbahn, built in the 1980s by Jack Carter and still exhibited in 2024, packs 30 feet of running line into an Alpine theme across five levels.

By the 1980s rabbit warrens had lost their popularity. 00-9 had developed as a serious modelling scale and the diminutive models of the first generation were dismissed as toys; encouraged by their small H0 scale, and quality problems under their later manufacturers. When a rabbit warren, or its flatland cousin the pizza layout, (Note: A continuous running loop layout in a single horizontal plane, circular for minimum dimensions and the size of a pizza box.) is made today, it is in a knowing context as a deliberately retro- and ironic effort.

== Prototypical rabbit warrens ==
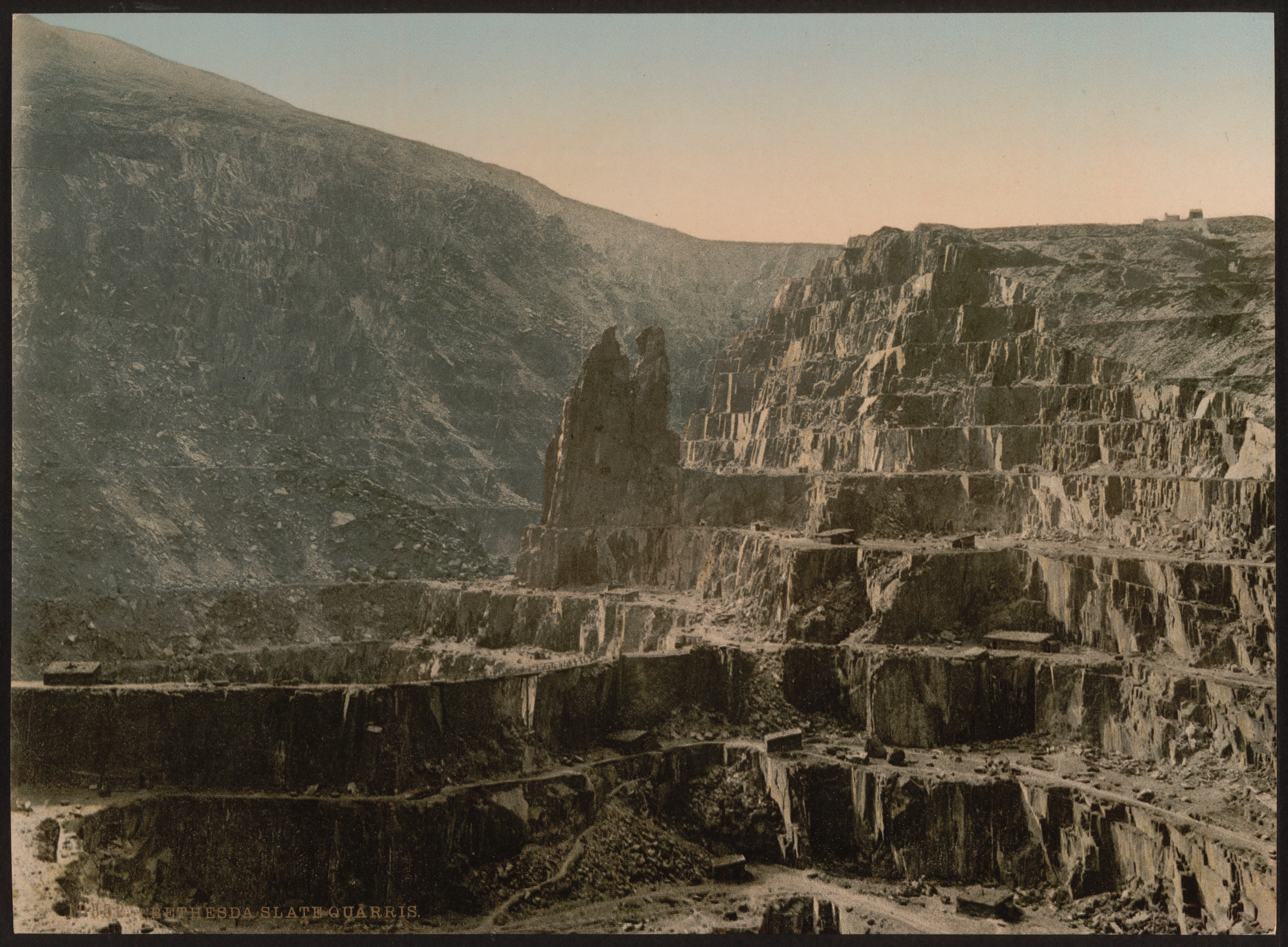
Terraced workings in Penrhyn slate quarry at Bethesda

Rabbit warrens had no original prototype but their closest approaches were the Welsh slate quarry railways. The quarries were vast, with terraces carrying level grade, but poorly-laid and uneven track of 2' gauge, worked by the ubiquitous Hunslet saddle tanks. Unlike the rabbit warren, these levels were linked by rope-worked inclines, rather than loco-hauled spirals. Crossing and tunnels were commonplace though, often through embankments built of piled slate waste.

Such quarries were first modelled in the 1970s with Dave Rowe's Under Milk Wood diorama boxes. In 1995 Railway Modeller returned to its rabbits with Chwarel, a realistic, but warrened, Welsh slate quarry plan. In deference to better running, this used three flat lefal, linked by inclines and a water balance lift. The scale now was O16.5 (7 mm scale on 16.5 mm track) on an 8 by 3 feet (2.44 m × 0.91 m) baseboard.
