= George Shaw (artist) =

English artist

- Born: 1966; Coventry
- Alma mater: Sheffield Hallam University; Royal College of Art
- Occupation: Painter, visual artist, artist

George Thomas Shaw (born 1966 in Coventry) is an English contemporary artist who is noted for his suburban subject matter. He was nominated for the Turner Prize in 2011.

== Biography ==
Shaw first attracted attention for painting the estate where he grew up in the 1970s, in the Tile Hill suburb of Coventry. Shaw studied art at Sheffield Polytechnic and received a BA in 1989. In 1998, he completed an MA in painting from London's Royal College of Art.

Shaw is noted for his highly detailed naturalistic approach and English suburban subject matter. His favoured medium is Humbrol enamel paints, which are more commonly used to paint Airfix models.

He was shortlisted for the Turner Prize in 2011 for The Sly and Unseen Day.

Shaw contributed a short story "The Necromantic" to 13, a collection of short stories published by Soul Bay Press.

Shaw is based in Ilfracombe, Devon.

== Solo exhibitions ==
- 2018 "George Shaw: A Corner of a Foreign Field," Yale Center for British Art, New Haven, CT.
- 2016 "My Back to Nature", National Gallery, London.
- 2011 "George Shaw: I woz ere," Herbert Art Gallery & Museum, Coventry.
- 2011 "The Sly and Unseen Day," BALTIC Centre for Contemporary Art, Gateshead.
- 2010 "Looking for Baz, Shaz, Gaz and Daz," VOID, Derry, Northern Ireland.
- 2009 "Woodsman," Wilkinson Gallery, London.
- 2008 "The End of the World," Galerie Hussenot, Paris.
- 2007 "Poets Day," Kunstverein Freiburg, Breisgau, Germany.
- 2007 "A Day for a small Poet," Clough Hanson Gallery, Rhodes College, Memphis.
- 2006 "Poets Day," Centre d'Art Contemporain, Geneva.
- 2005 "Ash Wednesday," Wilkinson Gallery, London.
- 2004 What I Did This Summer, Dundee Contemporary Arts, Dundee.
- 2003 What I Did This Summer, Ikon Gallery, Birmingham and Newlyn Art Gallery, Penzance.
- 2001 The New Life, Anthony Wilkinson Gallery, London.
- 2000 Morrissey vs Francis Bacon, Nunnery Gallery, London.
- 1999 Of Innocence: Scenes From the Passion, Antony Wilkinson Gallery, London.
- 1998 God Only Knows, Hockney Gallery, Royal College of Art, London.
