= Minories (disambiguation) =

Minories is a street in Central London and former civil parish also known as Holy Trinity Minories

Minories may also refer to:

- Church of Holy Trinity, Minories, a former church in London
- Abbey of the Minoresses of St. Clare without Aldgate, a former convent in London
- Minories railway station, western terminus of the London and Blackwall Railway,
- The Minories, Colchester, a listed building and art gallery in Colchester
- Minories (model railway), a famous design of model railway by C.J. Freezer
