= Nicholas Kove =

Hungarian-British businessman (1891–1958)

Nicholas Kove (born Miklós Klein 1891 in Anarcs, Szabolcs County, Kingdom of Hungary – died 17 March 1958 in London) was a Hungarian-British businessman best known for founding the Airfix plastic model kit company.

== Biography ==
His birth name was Klein but he magyarised this to Köves (pronounced "Kurvesh") and subsequently anglicised it to Kove. An energetic and resourceful man, he was a cavalry officer in the Austro-Hungarian army in the First World War but was captured by the Russians. He was interned in a camp near the Korean border but escaped across Siberia with the help of Catholic priests. It took him four months to return home to Anarcs.

After the war he worked as an assistant minister in the short-lived Communist government of Béla Kun. After the fall of the Hungarian Soviet Republic, he emigrated to Algiers in 1922 with his wife Clothilde and baby daughter Margit. In 1934 the family moved to Barcelona where Kove started a plastics factory; at the outbreak of the Spanish Civil War in August 1936, they fled to Milan. There Kove patented a process for stiffening shirt collars, which he called "Interfix".

In the autumn of 1938, he moved his family from Milan to London, where he established Airfix Products in 1939, originally to manufacture rubber inflated toys. After the Second World War he switched to producing plastic combs, and was the first manufacturer to introduce a plastic injection moulding machine. For a while he was the largest supplier of die-stamped metal belt buckles to the War Office. After an operation for cancer in 1950, he took on Ralph Ehrmann as assistant manager, who together with John Gray persuaded him to move into construction kits.

== Death ==
Shortly after seeing Airfix become a public company in 1957, Kove died at his home at 252 Finchley Road, London, on 17 March 1958, three weeks after the death of his wife.

== Sources ==
- Arthur Ward. Airfix - Celebrating 50 Years of the Greatest Plastic Kits in the World. Collins. 1999.
- Arthur Ward The Boys' Book of Airfix
- Plastic Warrior - Airfix - The Early Days. 2004. The Birth of Airfix. Paul Reboul.
- The Register. Margaret Elliott. The Times. July 22, 2002.
- Early Days at Airfix. Constant Scale - The Journal of the Airfix Collectors Club. No. 25 - Vol 7. No. 1 - 2006.
- Early Days at Airfix. Update. Constant Scale. No. 29 - Vol 8 No 1 - 2007.
- Early Days at Airfix. Further Update. Constant Scale. No. 30 - Vol 8 No.2 - 2007.
