= Minories (model railway) =

Design for a model railway layout

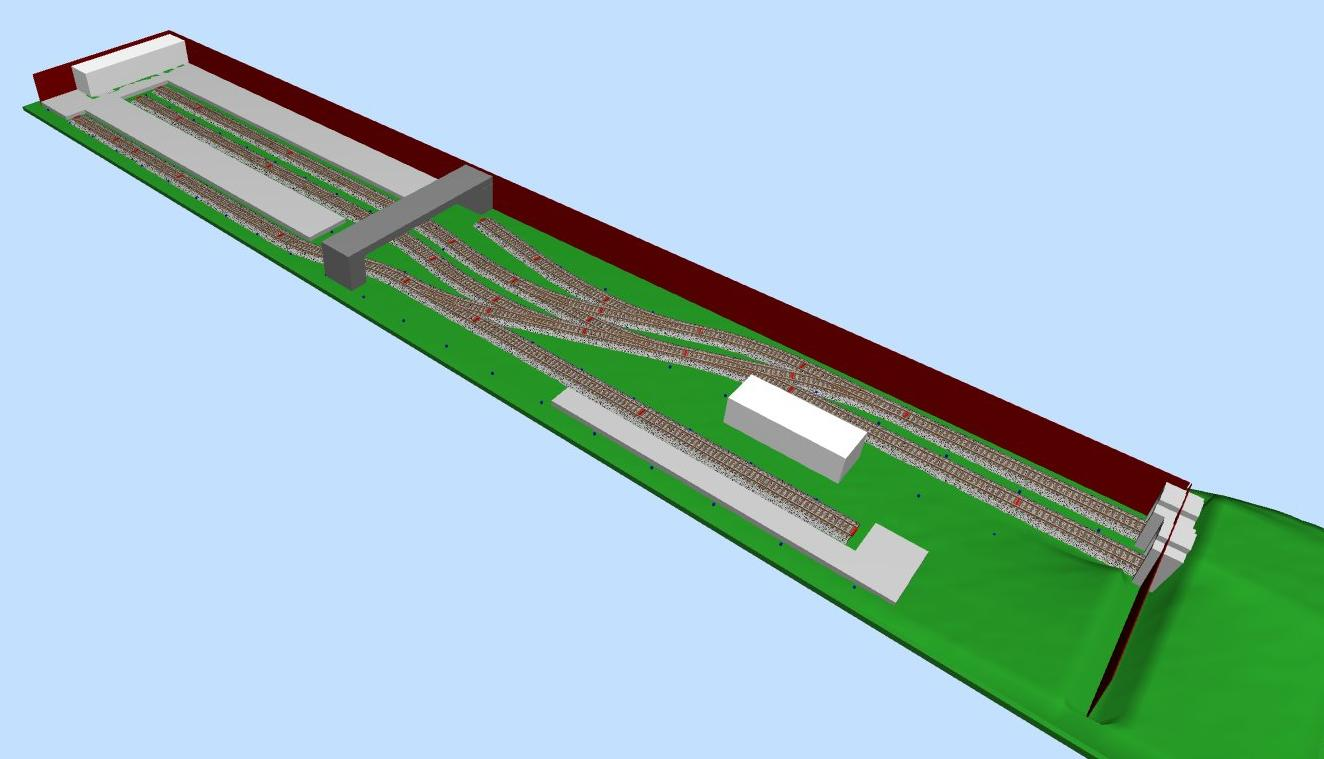

Minories is a 'deceptively simple' design for a model railway layout, designed by C. J. Freezer. The design was first published in Railway Modeller in 1957 and it became a regular of Peco's many collected plans books afterwards. It is notable as an influential design, more than as a single instance of the model. The design was an attempt to model an interesting urban passenger terminus in the minimum space, allowing much opportunity for operating trains, rather than scenic modelling. Freezer was the editor of Railway Modeller and Minories, with its developments, made regular appearances throughout the years.

== Prototype ==
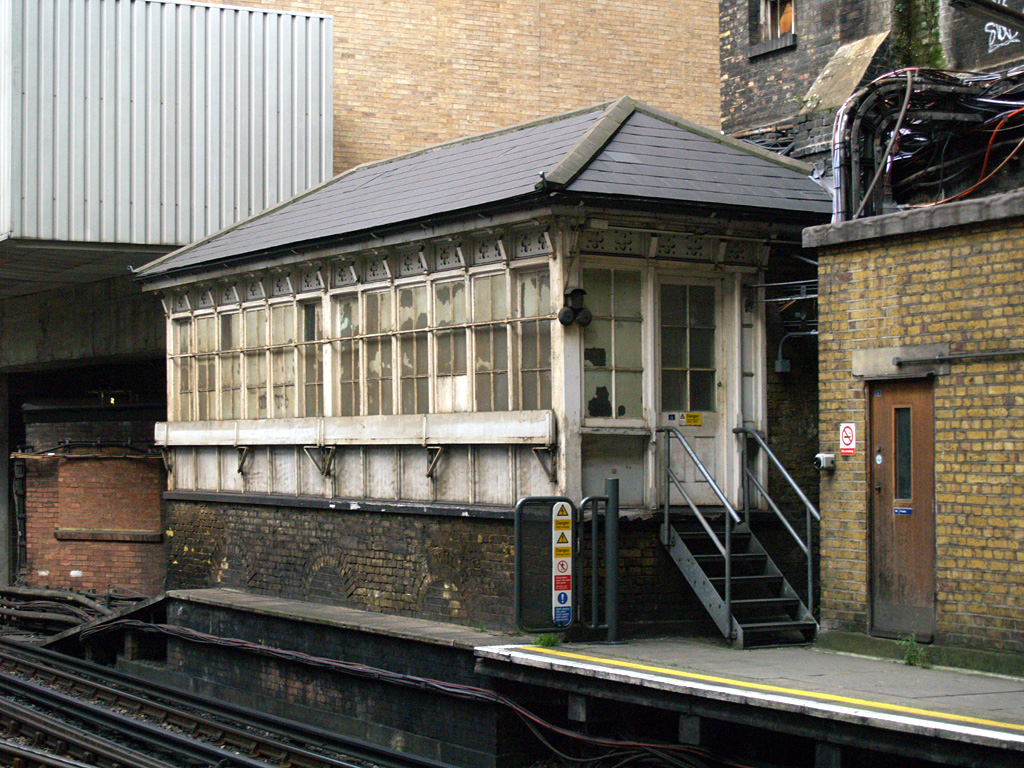
The surviving signal box of the low-level Liverpool Street

Its inspiration was the Metropolitan Railway low-level platforms within Liverpool Street station in London, although re-cast as a terminus. This station was set within a deep cutting in a dense urban environment. Similar station sites could be found in many UK cities.

Although primarily a passenger station, such stations commonly also had a bay platform for parcels, newspaper or mail traffic.

In the steam era a small terminus would also have facilities for changing and possibly watering locomotives. Trains would be hauled in by one locomotive that would then be uncoupled but remain trapped in the end of the platform line until the train departed in the opposite direction, hauled away by a fresh locomotive. The main locomotive depot would be at a suburban distance, to save on expensive city centre land. As tender locomotives avoid running backwards where possible, mid-size termini may have a small turntable as well, but coaling and ash-dropping would still be elsewhere. There may also be a small spur for a station pilot loco; which moved rakes of empty coaching stock to and from carriage sidings elsewhere, as needed to cope with extra rush hour traffic.

== Model ==
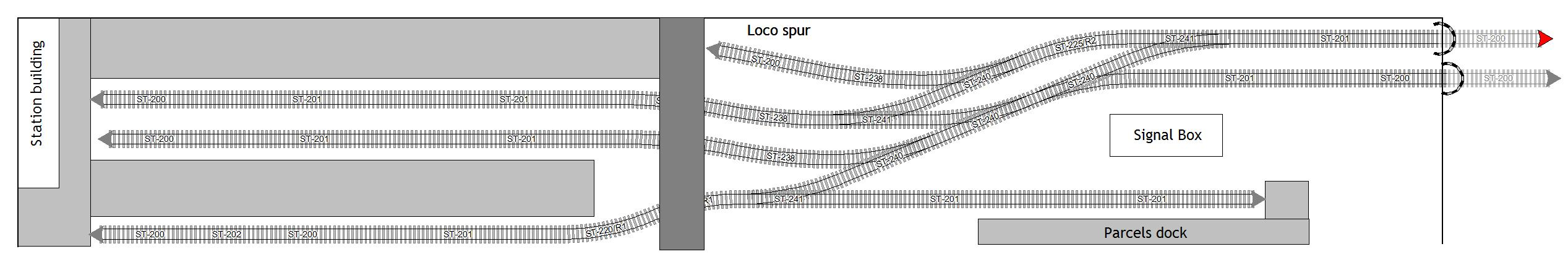

The purpose of the model was to provide a passenger terminus with opportunities for interesting operation of trains. It was also to fit within a small space, and to fold away even smaller for storage.

A double track entry by tunnel led to three terminal platforms. Further spurs were provided as a bay platform for parcels and a short one for a station pilot locomotive. All pointwork was grouped together in the station throat, switching between the main running lines and platforms being by two crossovers: one facing, one trailing.

As a model, the layout took many features of the urban original and turned them to its advantage. The low-level urban setting of the Metropolitan was surrounded by a retaining wall which provided an obvious scenic break to the model. It also justified the popular, but sometimes contrived, technique of a tunnel exit to the off-board fiddle yard. Fiddle yards, and their use for the "Fiddle Yard to Terminus" layout, were themselves a technique earlier popularised by Freezer.

British railway modelling of this period was almost entirely OO gauge. Typical small model railways were based on a notional GWR rustic branch line terminus, with small locomotives and sparse timetables. Minories was an opportunity to model the more vibrant urban traffic, but without requiring a great deal of space. Choosing a terminus instead of through platforms allowed a major space saving, as the layout no longer required a room-filling large radius running loop as well.

The original Minories layout was 1 by 7 feet (0.3 m × 2.1 m) in size, with the fiddle yard additional to this. It folded in half lengthwise, using a removable girder road bridge to hide the hinges. A two-section folding baseboard was an obvious plan for a layout, as the sections could fold in on themselves to make a protected storage box. However this also required the hinges to be above 'ground level' to allow height for buildings etc., usually difficult to achieve for rural scenes, but easily done here with the retaining wall and bridge.

Minories packed a great deal into its small space. The cutting location gave a plausible excuse to fill every inch of the baseboard with trains and the assumption of an exit via cut-and-cover lines also explained the abrupt scenic break. Lines from the platforms exited via a pair of facing and trailing crossovers that allowed access from both running lines to any of the platforms, despite only using six or seven sets of points. By curving these lines around obstacles such as a signal box, the visual impression was also given of a far longer running space.

Another of the subtle technical benefits of the design was that all of the pointwork was concentrated on one folding baseboard, the other merely being the platform lengths. This simplified their operation, especially in the early days when electric point motors were rare and remote operation of points would be done by the mechanical wire-in-tube method, which could not cross the baseboard hinge.

One feature it did not have was the otherwise ubiquitous run-round loop, a staple of the rural branch line model. This meant that arriving locos were trapped in the platform ends until released by another. Requiring two working locos was not a problem for a busy urban station and it was a virtue to the modeller looking for excuses to run more stock in less space. It was contrary to rustic working though and the 'one engine in steam' principle. For this reason Minories was rarely modeled in 00-9 or other narrow gauge scales.

The layout design has been modelled in many eras, from the original mid-20th century steam period back to the early days of the Victorian underground Metropolitan Railway and to the modern era of multiple unit working. In 2007 the Diesel and Electric Modellers United (DEMU) ran a small layout competition to celebrate the 50th anniversary of the plan's publication. The competition was to build and exhibit a layout based on the Minories trackplan and was judged by Cyril's son Nick. A number of exceptionally high quality layouts were entered including "Ripper Street", "Minories GN" and "Westonmouth Central". The winner was eventually chosen as "Birmingham Moor Street" by the Scalefour Society WMAG.

== See also ==
- List of notable model railways
