= Roy Cross =

Roy Cross may refer to:

- Roy Cross (footballer) (born 1947), English footballer
- Roy Cross (artist) (1924–2024), British artist
