= Fiddle yard =

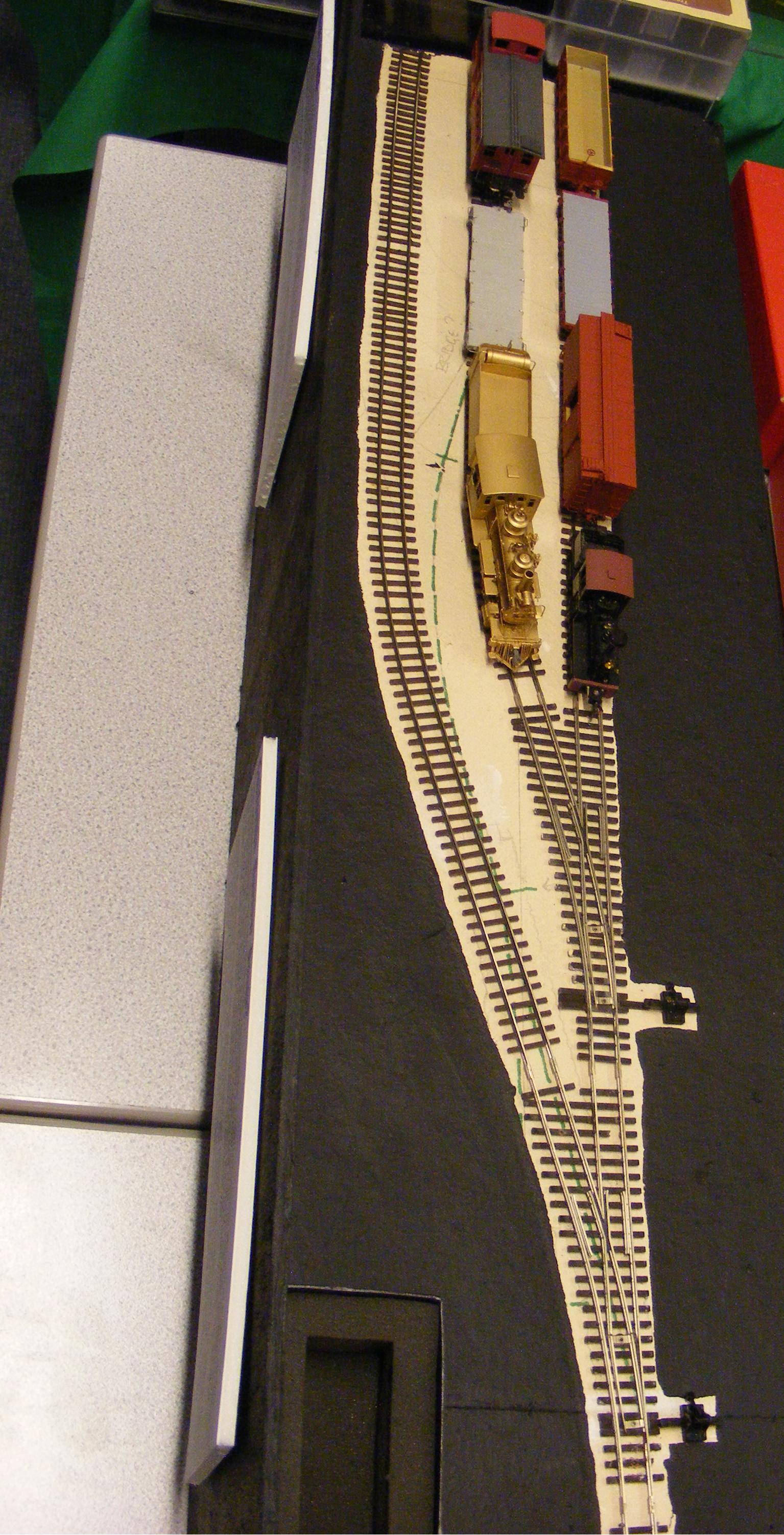
A simple fiddle yard with three sidings. The track at the bottom goes to the scenic section of the layout.

A fiddle yard or staging yard is a collection of model railway tracks that are hidden from view and allow trains to be stored and manipulated by the operators. These tracks are used to allow most model railways to be operated in a realistic manner. Whilst it is possible to have a realistic shunting yard in view, its operation is generally unreliable with models.

Trains can be rearranged by lifting them off the track and replacing them.

== Development ==
Fiddle yards were first built by British modellers so that they could build small layouts and operate them in a realistic manner. The first well-known model railway to use them was 'Maybank', which was exhibited at the 1939 Model Railway Club exhibition in London. This was an urban passenger terminus that led directly into a fiddle yard, hidden beneath a locomotive depot above it. It had an influence on C. J. Freezer, who as editor of Railway Modeller, would later go on to popularise them. In the 1950s he described the "Fiddle Yard to Terminus" layout, and used it for his influential 'Minories' design.

The 'Peter Denny' design of fiddle yard, using a removable 'cassette' of tracks, was developed by the Reverend Peter Denny for his Buckingham Great Central layout around 1952. This used a number of parallel tracks and could also be used for rolling stock storage or transport, off the layout. Some of these cassettes use conventional pointwork, others slide sideways as a traverser, Denny's original rotated around a central pivot. Denny also used it to rotate by half a turn and to reverse the trains wholesale, without needing to uncouple and move locomotives from one end to the other. Denny was noted for his use of non-railway mechanisms and the original was cranked around by a Meccano geared drive, with remote switching and monitoring by a row of sprung metal contacts.

== Designs ==
The fiddle yard is part of a layout, and as such varies with the type layout design, particularly whether it is of the "end-to-end" or "continuous run" type. There may be more than one yard per layout. The design also varies by how much the operator wishes to handle the stock—they can be completely manual, completely automatic, or somewhere in between. Each design has different space requirements which must be factored into consideration at the design stage.

Broadly designs can be into categories:

- Fan of points giving many roads can be easily constructed, operated automatically using point motors, and are simple to construct, although turnouts can be expensive, especially if motorised.
- Traverser (known as "transfer table" in the US) where parallel tracks are moved perpendicular to the entrance/exit track(s). In this way each road can be aligned in turn with the entrance/exit track(s).
- Turntable, where usually multiple tracks are on the same turntable pivoting around a central point. In this way, entire trains can be turned. Generally only suitable for layouts with shorter trains (i.e. smaller scales).
- Sector plate which pivots around a point but unlike a turntable cannot turn completely. Due to geometry, this usually has a single entrance/exit.
- Cassette where sections of track within solid bases holding one or more items of rolling stock are moved manually into position.
- Elevator, where tracks are moved in a vertical direction. The elevator may itself be storage with multiple decks, or it may be single decked and move stock onto a different level, for example to other storage under the main layout.

Combinations of the two above are also possible; for example a sector plate may be combined with a turntable for turning locomotives separately from their trains and allowing for them to be run round.

Fiddle yards can also contain a balloon loop for turning entire trains, usually in conjunction with a fan or traverser design.
