= Pizza layout =

Model railway laid out as a small circle

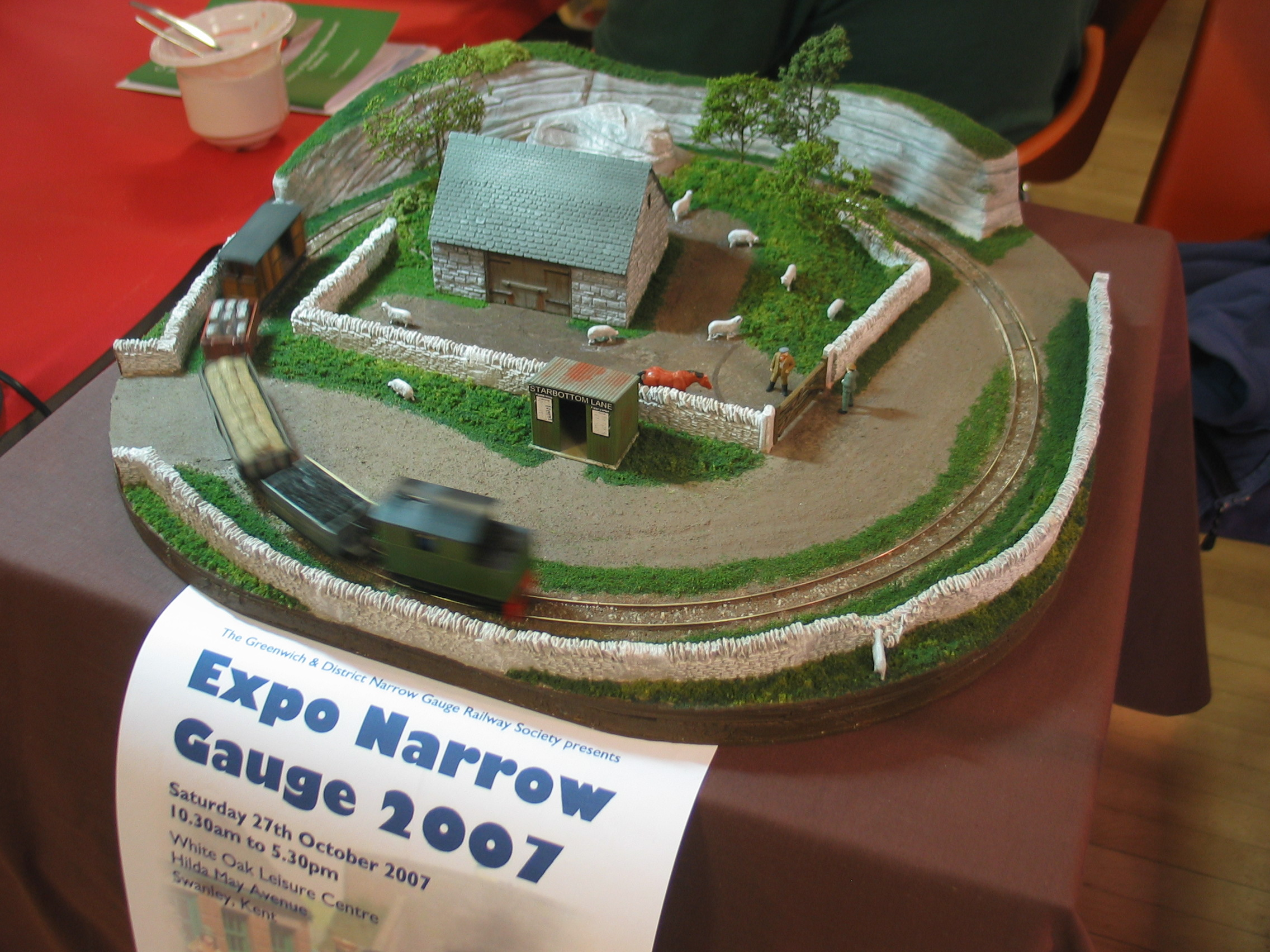
H0e scale

A pizza layout, sometimes referred to in context simply as a pizza, is a type of model railway micro layout that is laid out as a circle of the smallest workable radius of curve, on the smallest possible square or circular baseboard. This baseboard can be so small as to look as if it would fit into a pizza box, hence the name.

== Design practices ==
Pizza layouts are not necessarily serious scale models, and often provide a little humor. Although they can be built by beginners due to their simplicity, they are more often built to provide light relief for experienced modellers. Quick to build and less expensive than a full layout, they are often used as a theme for exhibitions and contests.

Pizza layouts are often seasonally themed, such as Christmas layouts. They often provide an opportunity to experiment with a different gauge and scale from a modeller's regular work.

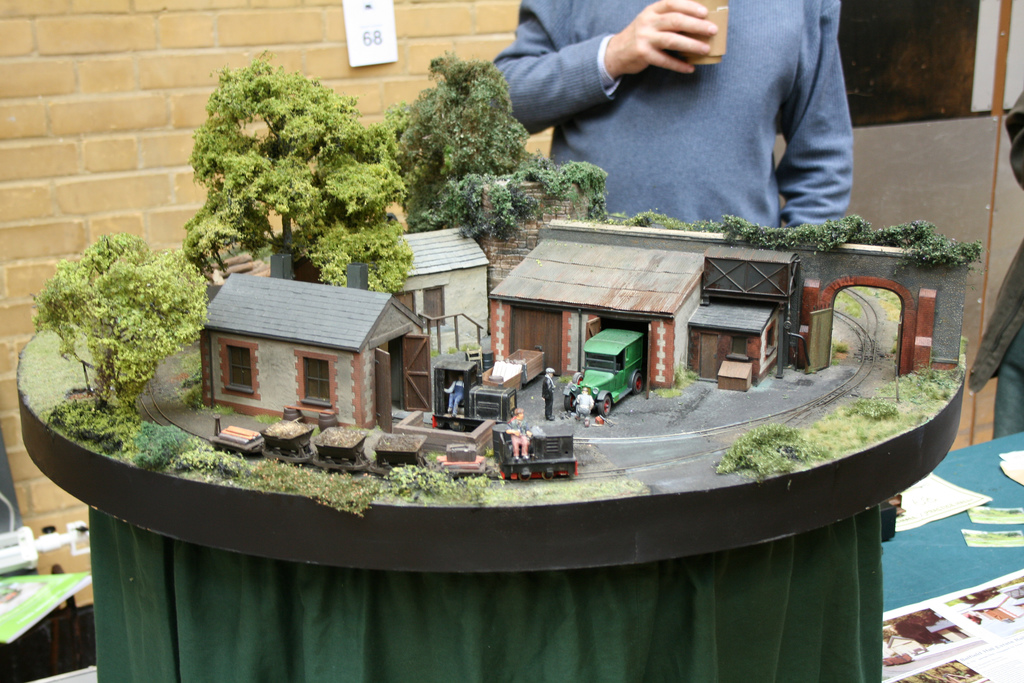
A more sophisticated pizza layout in O9 gauge, with highly detailed scenery. It can be rotated to present any of three 120° scenes to the observer.

Building a minimum-size layout requires a smaller gauge. Most pizza layouts use 9 mm gauge, as for N gauge. Z gauge and the esoteric smaller gauges can also be used, but their costs are more than 9 mm and they offer fewer options. Other gauges up to the popular H0/OO 16.5mm gauge have also been used, but typically as narrow-gauge models.

Most pizzas model narrow-gauge railways. This combines the narrow physical gauge needed with a larger and more visible scale. Narrow-gauge prototypes have short wheelbases and slow running speeds, and so they are often more accepting of tight curve radii. Where standard gauge is modelled, this is only for N, Z, or smaller gauges. H0 requires a size greater than the usual 'pizza' format, although this can just be achieved with just a two-foot (60 cm) diameter.

For an 00-9 or H0e pizza, using 9mm gauge and either 4mm or 3.5mm scale, a workable minimum curve radius is 6 inches (15 cm), for an overall baseboard diameter of 15 inches (380 mm; 38 cm), within the pizza box format. Some model companies, such as Tomix, even produce extra-small radius curves of 4-inch (10 cm) radius, for modelling trams. These have been used to model at N gauge within a 9-inch (23 cm) baseboard.

Gn15-gauge models one of the smallest prototypical gauges, 15-inch (38 cm) minimum-gauge railways. This gives the greatest combination of small curve radius and largest scale.

Nn3 Z gauge has been used to make layouts inside a large glass bottle.

A pizza layout is typically a simple circular loop. Points are usually limited to just one or two small sidings that are more decorative than useful for shunting. A siding to the outside of the loop requires a larger baseboard. For a siding inside the loop, the siding's radius must be smaller than that of the running loop, which is already close to the minimum radius. Allowing the loop to be a little larger, so as to permit a tighter siding curve within it, means a larger loop and baseboard. This can be done most compactly by stretching the circular loop to an oval, while keeping the same radius with an added straight; the point comes off the straight portion. Although rare in practice, a fiddle yard can be incorporated into a hidden part of the layout.

Some pizza layouts have, rarely, also used multi-level spiral layouts, with something of a rabbit warren look to them.

== Scenery ==
Scenery can be realistic, a caricature of geography containing real buildings, or deliberately unrealistic.

One major design consideration that can present some difficulty is the likelihood that all of the layout can be seen at once, and the problem of finding any sort of visual break between the two sides. Many simply ignore this, placing a realistic building or feature in the center and ignoring the logical pointlessness of a railway that obviously circles without going anywhere.

Some layouts model funfairs, where the short circle can appear purposeful. A popular approach is to place a large visual break in the center of the layout, such as a hill or working quarry. This has the advantage of stopping the layout from looking so obviously like a loop, but at the risk of instead looking like a wedding cake with an arbitrary hill in the middle.

Many alpine or mining layouts have hidden half of the loop beneath tunnels.

== See also ==
- Rabbit warren layout — another small humorous layout design based on a continual running loop.
- Suitcase layout — tiny layouts, usually Z gauge, that fold into a portable case.
