= Ralph Ehrmann =

British businessman noted for his role in toy industry (1925-2023)

- Born: March 8, 1925; Leipzig, Germany
- Died: January 10, 2023 (aged 97); London, United Kingdom
- Occupation: Businessman
- Known for: Role in the development of Airfix toy models
- Spouse: Inge Landecker (m. 1955; died 2022)
- Children: 2

Ralph Rudolf Mathias Ehrmann (March 8, 1925 – January 10, 2023) was a German-born British businessman noted for his role in the development of the toy industry through his work with Airfix, and his later involvement in banking industry.

== Early life and education ==
Born in Leipzig into a German-Jewish family, Ehrmann moved to London in 1933 and became a British citizen in 1939. He was educated at Hall preparatory school, St Paul's School, University of Reading, and the London School of Economics.

== Career ==
During World War II, Ehrmann served as a bomb aimer-navigator in the RAF, but his military career ended prematurely when his aircraft crashed during a training flight in 1944. Post-war, he initially worked as a journalist in Scandinavia, although he never published articles himself, instead providing content to local papers.

Ehrmann's business career began at Airfix, where he suggested the company diversify into producing plastic model kits. This venture led to the production of popular models such as historic ships and the iconic Spitfire. His business career expanded in the 1970s when he became a director at the new Triumph bank, and later moved to the United States to chair Clabir, a holding company with industrial interests.

== Personal life ==
Ehrmann was married to Inge Landecker from 1955 until her death in 2022, and they had two children. His daughter Helen predeceased him in 1997.
