= C. J. Freezer =

British writer and railway modeller (1924–2009)

- Born: Cyril John Freezer; 27 June 1924 Poplar, London, England
- Died: 19 May 2009 (aged 84) Hemel Hempstead, Hertfordshire, England
- Occupation: Railway modeller; Writer; Magazine editor
- Education: Barking Abbey School
- Spouse: Doris Bird (m. 1959)
- Children: 3

Cyril John Freezer (27 June 1924 – 19 May 2009) was an English railway modeller, writer, and magazine editor. He edited Railway Modeller from 1950 to 1978, and Model Railways from 1978 until 1983. He also wrote many articles for Model Railroader. Freezer popularised the 'terminus to fiddle yard layout', is credited with inventing the "rabbit warren layout", and published many books on model railways, many of which are considered classics in the field.

== Biography ==
Born in Poplar, London, Freezer was educated at Barking Abbey School. Training as an engineer in a dockyard on the Isle of Dogs and working for Associated Press, he started as editor of the Railway Modeller magazine. The first edition he was responsible for was August–September 1950.

He was a prolific designer of model railway layouts and published numerous books of track plans. Perhaps his most famous design was "Minories", a plan for a compact suburban terminus built on a folding baseboard. The layout was based loosely on the Metropolitan Railway station at Liverpool Street in London and packed a great deal of operating potential into a modest layout that could easily be built by a relatively inexperienced modeller. Originally published in 1957, innumerable layouts have been built following its simple but elegant design. From 1978 to 1983 he edited the magazine Model Railways.

In 2007 the Diesel and Electric Modellers United (DEMU) ran a small layout competition to celebrate the 50th anniversary of the plan's publication. The competition was to build and exhibit a layout based on the Minories trackplan and was judged by Cyril's son Nick. A number of exceptionally high quality layouts were entered including "Ripper Street", "Minories GN" and "Westonmouth Central". The winner was eventually chosen as "Birmingham Moor Street" by the Scalefour Society WMAG.

Freezer died on 19 May 2009, aged 84, in Hemel Hempstead, Hertfordshire, England.

== Books ==
- 60 Plans for Small Railways (1958)
- Plans for Larger Layouts (1960)
- Railway Modelling (1961)
- Locomotives in Outline: GWR (1977)
- Whizz Kids Model Railways (1980)
- Building Model Railways (1982)
- Great Western Kings (1984)
- V2 class Green Arrows (1984)
- Royal Scot (1985)
- Model Railways on a Budget (1987)
- PSL Book of Model Railway Track Plans (1988)
- PSL Books of Model Railway Wiring (1989)
- Track Plans for Various Locations (1989)
- Modelling the Steam Age Railway (1990)
- Model Railways (1980)
- Model Railway Signalling (1991)
- 1001 Model Railway Questions and Answers (1992)
- Model Railway Operation (1993)
- The Model Railway Manual (1994)
- The Garden Railway Manual (1995)
- The Model Railway Design Manual (1996)
- First Steps in Railway Modelling (1998)
