= Heller SA =

French model kit manufacturer

Heller Hobby GmbH
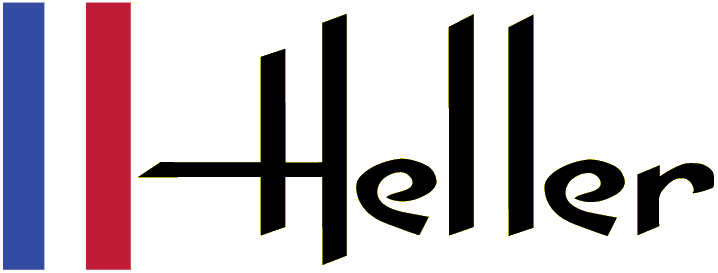
- Formerly: Heller S.A.
- Company type: GmbH
- Industry: manufacturing of games and toys
- Founded: 1957; 69 years ago in Paris, France
- Founder: Léo Jahiel
- Headquarters: Radevormwald, Germany
- Products: Scale model plastic cars, aircraft, ships, military vehicles
- Parent: Glow2B
- Website: heller.fr

Heller Hobby GmbH is a French manufacturing company established in 1957 in Paris. Currently headquartered in Radevormwald, Germany, Heller produces plastic scale model kits of cars, aircraft, ships, and military vehicles.

== History ==
Heller was founded in Paris in 1957 by Léo Jahiel, born in Lyon. He had previously worked at SOMAP, a plastics company, and set up company headquarters on Rue de Paradis in the 10th arrondissement of Paris, with a production facility in Trun, Orne. The first Heller's model kit was a 1/100 scale Sud Aviation Caravelle, produced the following year. In 1963, a production facility was established in Trun.

In 1972, Heller joined with Solido (a die cast toy car maker), Jouef (an HO scale train maker) and Delacoste (maker of balloons and toys) to form "Le Jouet Français." In 1980 the company went into liquidation and was in Court directed administration in May 1981. The company was broken up: Majorette bought Solido, Vullierme bought Delacoste, and Jouef was bought back by a subsidiary company of the "CEJI" group (Compagnie Générale du Jouet).

On June 9, 1977, Heller's founder, Léo Jahiel, was made a member of the Légion d'honneur by President Valéry Giscard d'Estaing for his years of professional activity.

Heller was acquired in 1981 by the Hobby Products Group of Borden, Inc., owners of British model company Humbrol. In 1986 Airfix also joined the group. Production of Airfix kits, already in Calais, moved to the Heller factory in Trun. Heller, with the rest of the group was acquired by an Irish investment company, Allen, McGuire & Partners, in 1994, and received 31 million francs of investment.

In 1999 Heller re-branded as Heller SA and acquired, together with the Thirion group, French toy manufacturer Joustra. In 2005, Heller SA was acquired by French buyers but in 2006 once again the company went into administration.

In July 2006 the company was put into receivership and in November Hornby PLC bought sister brands Airfix and Humbrol but not Heller or its factory. By January 2007 Heller SA was transferred to "la société MANOP" (Manufacture d'Objet Précieux) under the direction of Benjamin Leneman, and over the next 7 years slowly returned to profitability selling model kits.

Heller SA yet again found itself in trouble in 2016. It was "in a situation of non-financial return due to cash flow problems and a decline consumption related to the November attacks." The Commercial Court of Argentan, on 11 March, approved the acquisition of Heller-Joustra (Heller SA) by Maped, following six weeks of administration. Maped, in partnership with entrepreneur Alain Bernard of the New York Finance Innovation (of Paris) had invested 3.5 million euros in Heller-Joustra.

On March 18, 2019, Antoine Lacroix, Directeur General of Groupe Maped announced that Heller was acquired by the company Glow2B of Germany, which had been the distributor of Joustra and Heller products in that country. They announced that production would continue in both France and Germany.

=== Ownership history ===
| Period | Owner | Comments |
|---|---|---|
| 1957-1972 | Leo Heller Jahiel via Heller SA, France | First kit made in 1958 |
| 1972-1981 | Merges with Jouef, Solido and Delacoste to form The French Toys Group | The French Toys Group falls into administration in 1981. Borden Inc acquires Heller. |
| 1981-1994 | Borden Inc, US via Humbrol Ltd, UK | Humbrol had manufactured paints for Heller since 1977. Heller also moulded Airfix kits for Humbrol from 1986 to 2006. |
| 1994-2005 | Allen & Maguire, Ireland via Humbrol Ltd, UK | Allen & Maguire were venture capitalists. The purchase of Humbrol included a lot of debt and Allen & Maguire lost control to the Bank of Scotland in 2003. |
| 2005-2006 | Global Natural Ltd, England | Management buy-out of Heller SA from Humbrol Ltd. Ex-Humbrol MD Steve Lord headed the company. Company fell into administration in July 2006 and Hornby plc acquires Airfix and Humbrol. |
| 2007-2015 | MANOP, a French jewellery manufacturer buys the business for €200k. Now trades as Manop Heller Joustra SA. | Heller Joustra SA falls into administration in 2015. |
| 2016-2019 | Maped SA, an international French stationery and craft company buys Heller Joustra for €1.5m. | Maped is well known in the UK for its Helix mathematical instruments brand. |
| 2019 | Glow2B of Germany acquires Heller. | Glow2B was the distributor for Heller and Joustra in Germany, and plans to continue in both France and Germany. The Heller factory was acquired by plastic moulding company Viplast who will continue to mould Heller kits for Glow2B. |

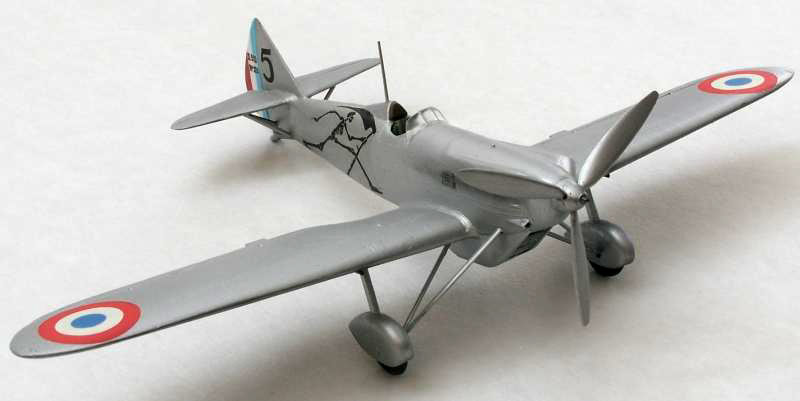
A 1/72 scale model of a Dewoitine D.510 from Heller

=== Bibliography ===
- Rampin Paolo, France in Miniature 1900–1980, Edizioni PR, Milano, 2004
