= Roy Cross (artist) =

British artist and aviation journalist (1924–2024)

Roy Cross (23 April 1924 – 24 April 2024) RSMA GAvA was a British artist and aviation journalist best known as the painter of artwork used on Airfix kits from the 1960s.

== Biography ==
Cross was born in Camberwell, London on 23 April 1924. He was mainly self-taught, learning his craft at the Camberwell School of Art and as a technical illustrator for training manuals for Fairey Aviation during the Second World War. He progressed from there to producing advertising art for the aircraft industry and other companies. He illustrated for The Aeroplane and the Eagle comic.

In 1952 he joined the Society of Aviation Artists, but it is for his work at Airfix which he is best known. He started in 1964 with box art for Airfix's Do 217 and his last work for them was the box art for the German heavy cruiser Prinz Eugen (1974). He went into marine paintings.

Much of the Airfix artwork was destroyed but the lids of many millions of boxes remain.

Cross was interviewed by James May in James May's Top Toys, discussing the changing tastes in box art and the airbrushing out of bombs and explosions from his pictures.

Cross died after a short illness on 24 April 2024, one day after his 100th birthday.
