= Humbrol =

British brand of paints

- Formerly: Humber Oil Company
- Industry: Paints; Toys; Model kits
- Founded: 1919; 107 years ago
- Fate: Company defunct in 2006, brand relaunched by Hornby
- Headquarters: Kingston upon Hull, England
- Products: Enamel; acrylic; airbrush paints; aerosol spray; varnish; adhesive; fillers; paint thinner; brushes
- Owner: Hornby
- Parent: Allen & McGuire (1994–2006); Borden, Inc. (1976–94)
- Subsidiaries: Airfix (1986–?); Heller (1981–2006)
- Website: humbrol.com

Humbrol Limited is a British brand and manufacturer of paints, solvents, and other accessories for scale model kits and toys. In the past, Humbrol produced under its own brand and the Airfix, Sky Marks, Young Scientist, 1st Gear, High Speed and W. Britain brands.

In 2006, the company entered administration, but later the same year was acquired by Hornby plc, who has since re-launched the brand.

== History ==
Humbrol was founded in Kingston upon Hull as the "Humber Oil Company" in 1919. After supplying oil for bicycles the company produced black paint for renovating them and then a range of twelve colours. During the 1950s and 1960s, Gerald Barton turned Humber Oil Company into "Humbrol" which developed a range of model paints and other modelmaking paraphernalia.

From 1967 to 1989 the company produced a Humbrol Authentic Colours range that was not only aimed at modellers but specifically reproduced historic colours, such as RAF Duck Egg Blue, Luftwaffe Dunkelgrun or GWR Coach Stock Chocolate. Initially these were only sold in sets, but from 1974 they were sold individually, with some changes to the range over time.

In 1976, Humbrol became part of the Hobby Products Group of the international Borden, Inc. group. Five years later, Borden also acquired the French kit manufacturer Heller.

The Airfix model company joined the group in 1986, transferring its kit production to the Heller factory in Trun, Orne, France. In 1994, the group was acquired by an Irish investment company, Allen & McGuire, and the business was restructured under the Humbrol name. Heller was sold off in 2005 but continued to manufacture kits for Humbrol.

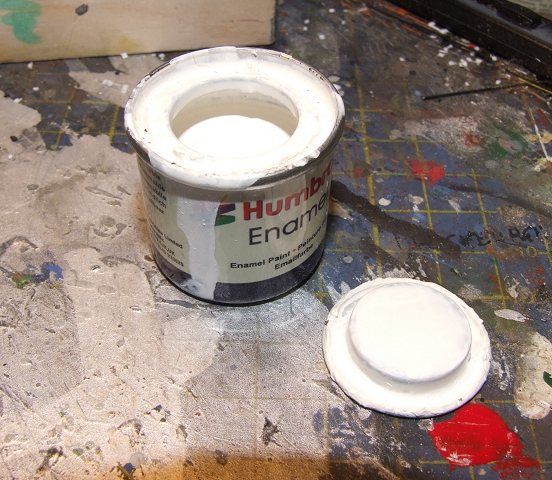
14ml can

On 31 August 2006, following the collapse of Heller SA, Humbrol went into administration. It was announced on 10 November 2006 that Hornby Railways would acquire certain assets of Humbrol, comprising Airfix, Humbrol paints and model accessories and the Young Scientist brand for £2.6 million.

Humbrol is possibly best known for the enamel paints manufactured for use with plastic model kits, such as Airfix, Tamiya and Revell kits. The paints are manufactured in multiple finishes: matt, satin, gloss, metallic and metalcote. The archetypal container was a 14 ml tin with the lid illustrating the paint colour and an embossed reference number. Humbrol does, however, sell 50 and 120ml tins and spray cans in some colours. The 50ml enamel paint tins and spray paints remain available. The tins are called "Humbrol DIY".

Humbrol's main factory was located on Hedon Road, Marfleet in Hull. In 1988, an acetone spill at the factory caused a fire resulting in the death of an employee. It closed c. 2006 and the site was completely redeveloped by 2014.

== Notable people ==
English contemporary artist George Shaw uses Humbrol enamel paints to create highly realistic paintings on MDF board.

Penny Taylor-Beardow, Chairman of the Guild of Waterway Artists uses Humbrol enamels on prepared Birch ply to create her waterways paintings.
