= Dapol =

British model railway manufacturer

Dapol Ltd.
- Type: Private
- Industry: Model railway components
- Founded: 1983
- Founder: David Boyle
- Headquarters: Chirk, Wrexham, Wales
- Website: www.dapol.co.uk

Dapol Ltd is a model railway manufacturer based in Chirk, Wales.

== History ==
Dapol's name is a play on its founders David and Pauline Boyle's names. He owned a model concern Highfield Birds & Models. In 1981 he first tried to buy the Airfix and Mainline ranges.

The Dapol brand name was first used in a Railway Modeller advert of September 1983. The first Dapol wagons (for OO) were announced to become available on 20 November 1983. From 1 March 1984 ex Airfix railway kits became available.

Later in the year Railway Modeller magazine carried a two-page profile of the new concern with the upbeat title 'An exciting new model empire'.

Dapol also acquired stocks of Matchbox's Powertrack slot car system when that brand exited the slot car market in 1982. Dapol set up a subsidiary called CounterLane Limited and reissued Powertrack under that brand name in similar boxes to its model railway range. During 1985 Dapol successfully bought Mainline (and thereby the former Airfix) model railway ranges from Palitoy. It was announced in the Railway Modeller of February 1989 that Dapol had bought the former Trix/British Liliput range from Ernest Rosza. The Dapol 1989 catalogue also showed that the Model-Land building range had been bought.

In 1994, while the company was moving to Llangollen in North Wales, a fire destroyed the old site at Winsford in Cheshire, and large quantities of products and historical Wrenn material were destroyed. In 1996 Dapol sold many of its inherited model railway lines to Hornby.

In April 2025, Dapol announced they would be suspending all orders from the United States until further notice.

== Products ==
=== OO Gauge ===
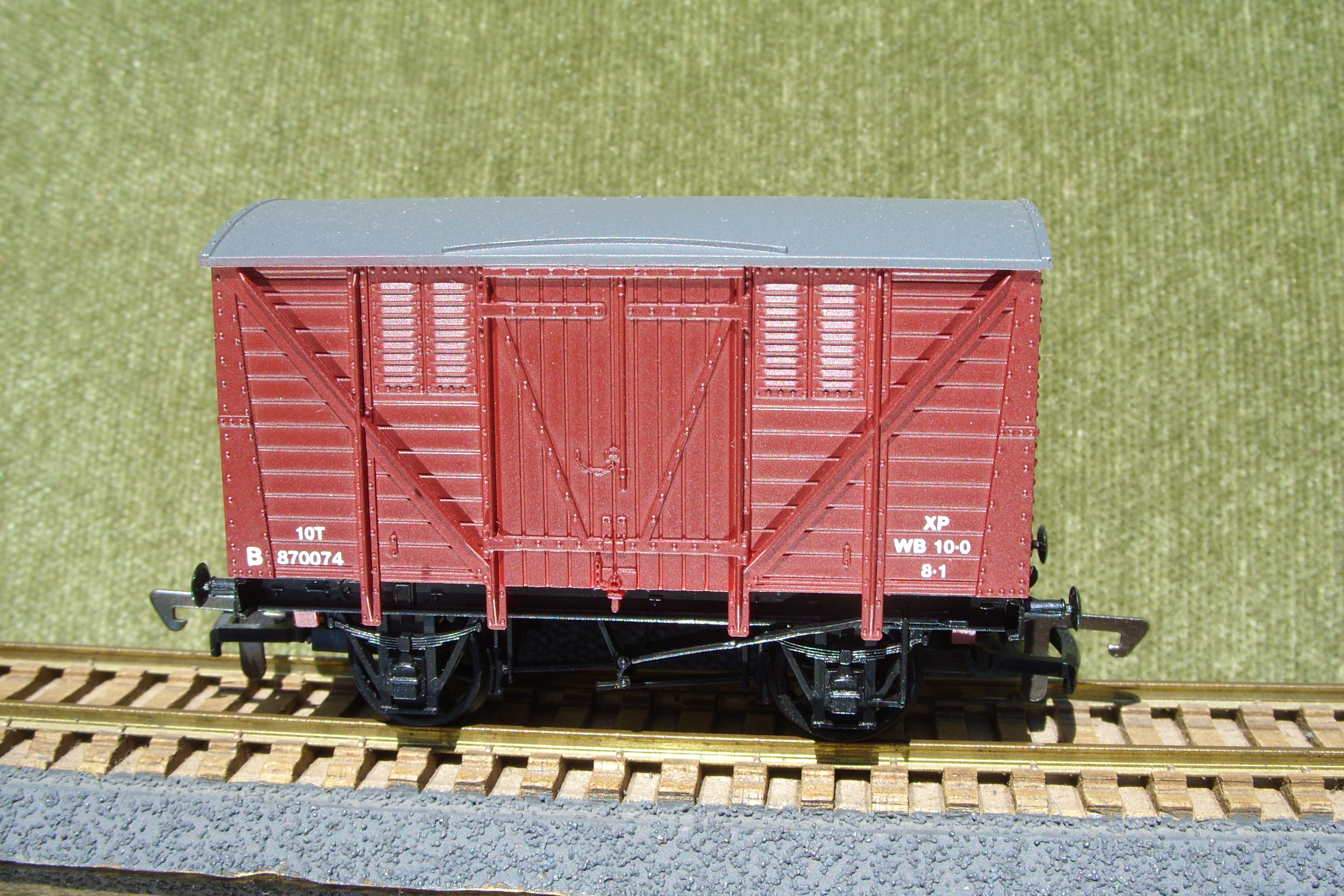
Dapol B26 OO scale wagon 10 ton BR meat wagon

The first OO scale locomotives to be entirely originated by Dapol were the L&YR Pug 0-4-0ST, the Austerity 0-6-0ST and GWR County 4-6-0 generated in 1984/5. The next was the LB&SCR Terrier. This was shown in the 1988 catalogue having been announced at the 1987 Toy Fair.

=== O Gauge ===
Dapol have released several locomotives and rolling stock in O gauge, including the Austerity J94 and Great Western Toad Brake Van.
