= Point machine =

Device for operating railway turnouts

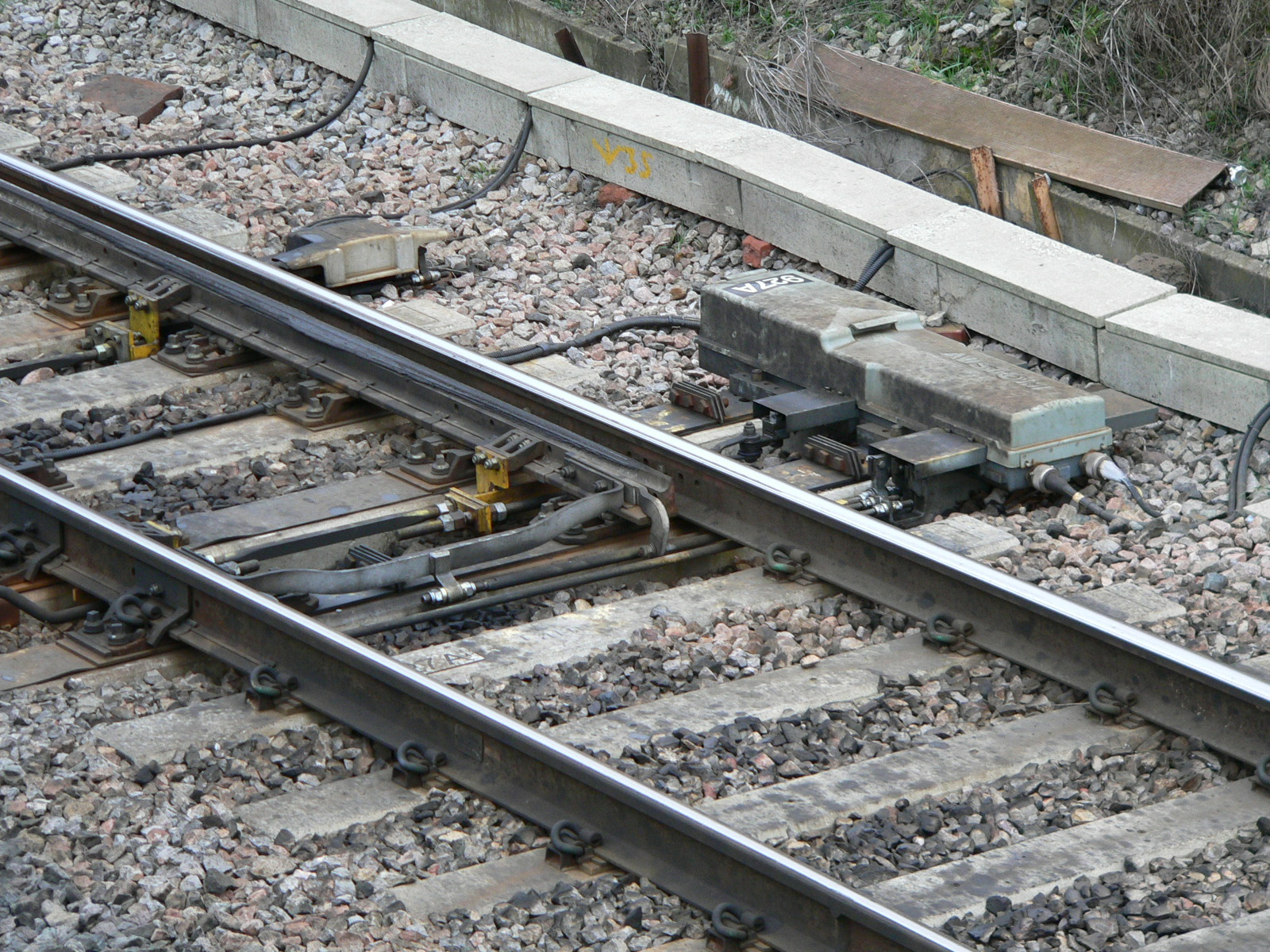
The point machine (in this case an electric motor) and associated mechanism used to operate this switch can be seen to the right in the picture

A point machine (also known as a point motor, switch machine or switch motor) is a device for operating railway turnouts especially at a distance.

== Overview ==
In the earliest times, points were operated manually by levers. Gradually, these were centralized and came to be operated from a signal box, either by rods, or by double wire arrangements.

Since the limitation of mechanical operation restricted the design of track layouts on the one hand, and tended to require more signal boxes, even lightly used ones, on the other hand, there has always been a desire of railway administrations to increase the distance that remote turnouts can be operated. This requires some kind of power operation of points and signals. The principal means of power operation include hydraulic, pneumatic and electric.

More recently with the increase in weight of rail, and the introduction of high speed turnouts with finer angles requiring multiple drives, points have become stiffer and beyond the capability of mechanical drives, forcing the introduction of point machines if not already done so.

== Principle ==
Modern point machines have an electric motor and gears to convert the rotational motion of the motor into the linear motion required to switch the points. The gear assembly also provides the required transmission ratio so that it can generate necessary force to move switch blades. The machine performs the following functions:

1. Moving switch blades
2. Locking the blades
3. Detection and proving the position of blades

== Point machine conversion - manual to motorized ==
A point machine conversion system consists of a remotely controlled device attached to an existing manually operated point that allows the shunter/driver to remotely operate hand points with a radio handset. Each converter can be used as a stand-alone or multiple units can be installed operating together with routing.

== In-tie unit ==
The latest development is to mount the switch motor inside a faux railroad tie (a.k.a. sleeper) where it is relatively hidden from damage from track maintenance machines.

== See also ==
- Double junction
