= Airfix =

UK manufacturer of injection-moulded plastic scale model

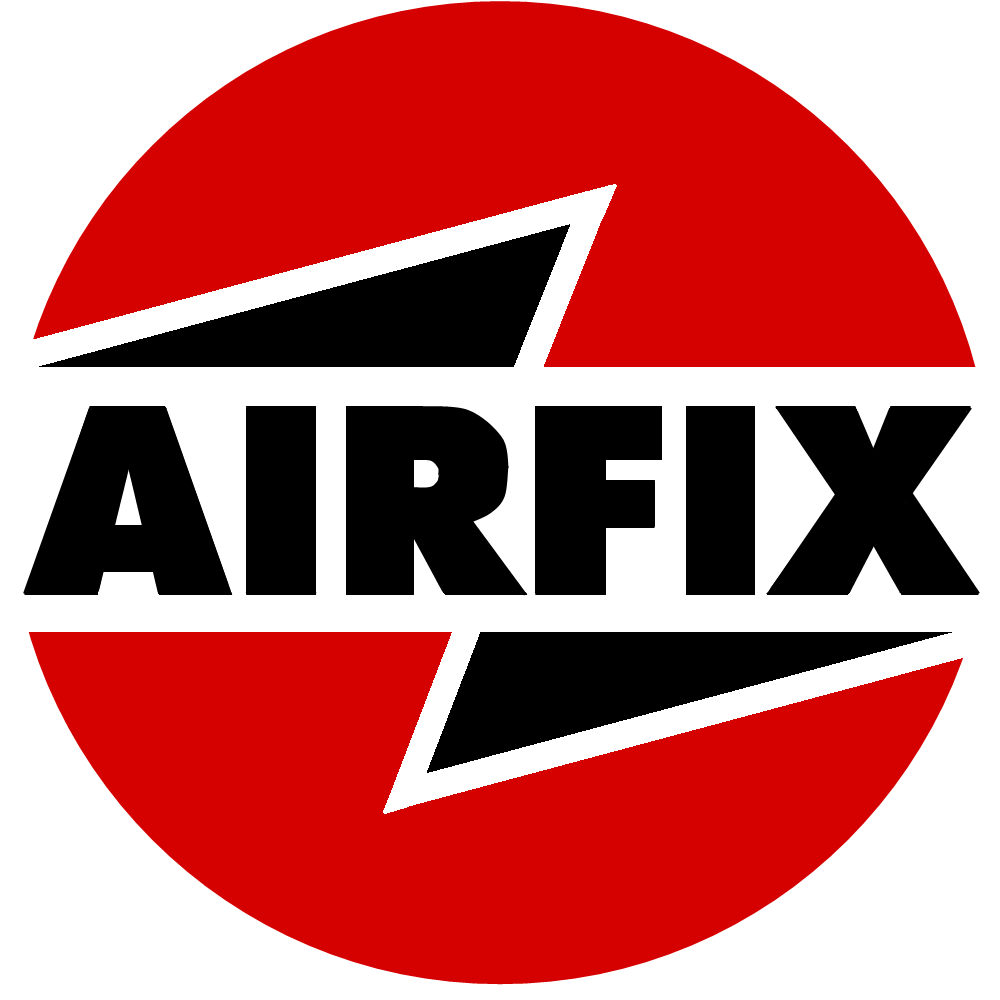
- Type: Private (1939–86)
- Founded: 1939
- Founder: Nicholas Kove
- Defunct: 2006; 20 years ago
- Fate: Acquired by Humbrol in 1986, until its closure in 2006, becoming a brand
- Headquarters: United Kingdom
- Products: Scale model cars, aircraft, ships, commercial vehicles, military vehicles, railways
- Brands: Kitmaster (1962–2006)
- Owner: Hornby plc (2006–present)
- Parent: Humbrol (1986–2006)
- Website: uk.airfix.com

Airfix is a British brand and former manufacturing company which produced injection-moulded plastic scale model kits. In the UK, the name 'Airfix' has become practically synonymous with plastic models of this type, "they became a sort of generic name for any plastic, injection-moulded model kit".

Airfix manufactured a wide range of plastic model products such as cars, aircraft, ships, commercial vehicles, military vehicles, railways, and figures. Founded in 1939, Airfix was owned by Humbrol from 1986 until Humbrol's financial collapse in August 2006. Since 2007, both Humbrol and Airfix have been owned by Hornby.

== History ==
Airfix was founded in 1939 by Hungarian businessman Nicholas Kove, initially to manufacture inflatable rubber toys. The brand name was selected so that it would be alphabetically the first in trade directories. In 1947, Airfix introduced injection moulding, initially producing pocket combs. In 1949, the company was commissioned to create a promotional model of a Ferguson TE20 tractor, moulded in cellulose acetate plastic and hand-assembled for distribution to Ferguson sales representatives. To increase sales and lower production costs, the model was sold in kit form by Woolworths retail stores.

In 1954, Woolworths buyer Jim Russon suggested that Airfix produce a model kit of Sir Francis Drake's Golden Hind, then being sold in North America as a 'ship-in-a-bottle', made in the more stable polystyrene. To meet Woolworths retail price of two shillings, Airfix packaged the product in a plastic bag with a paper header that had the assembly instructions on the reverse. Its huge success led the company to produce new kit designs. The first aircraft kit was released in 1953, a model of the Supermarine Spitfire Mk I, followed by the Spitfire Mk IX in 1958, in 1/72 scale, developed by James Hay Stevens. This was a scaled-down copy of the Aurora 1/48 Supermarine Spitfire kit, although it is unknown if this kit was produced with authorization from Aurora.

Airfix later received complaint letters from modellers and former Royal Air Force (RAF) personnel regarding inaccuracies of the 1/72 Spitfire Mk I that were carried over from the original 1/48 Aurora model, particularly the BTK squadron code provided in the decal sheet. The code was never used on a Spitfire, as it was used by a squadron operating the Supermarine Walrus amphibious biplane. One of the complaints came from modeller John Edwards, who was appointed as Airfix's chief designer after convincing the company that he could improve their aircraft kits. Edwards helped release a more accurate Spitfire Mk IX model in 1955. He directed the designs of Airfix kits in other ranges for another 15 years, until his death at the age of 38.

=== Expansion ===
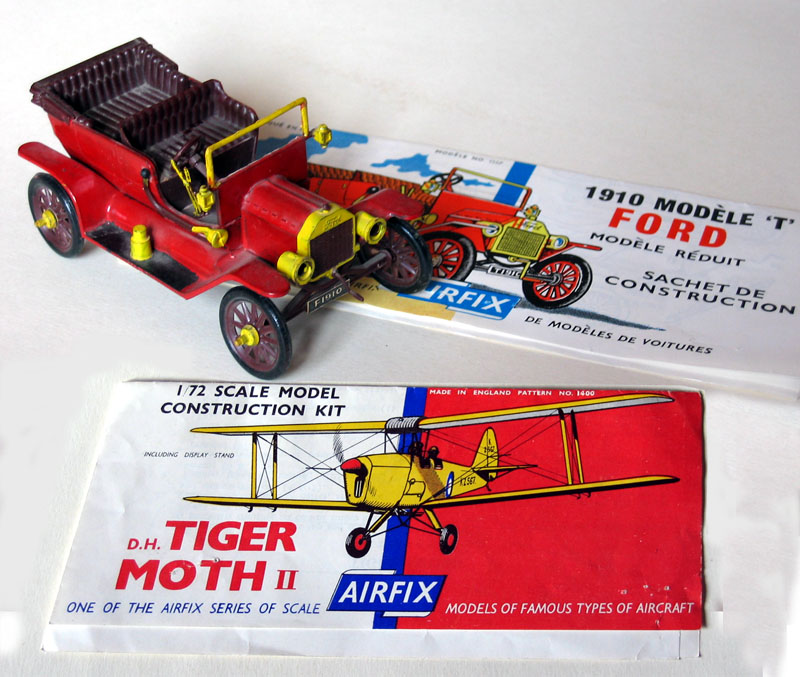
Airfix models from 1957

During the 1960s and 1970s, the company expanded as the hobby grew. The range expanded to include vintage and modern cars, motorcycles, figures in both 1/76 and 1/32 scale, trains, model railway accessories, military vehicles, ships, rockets and spaceships, as well as an ever-increasing range of aircraft, most created at the scales of 1/72 for small and military aircraft and 1/144 scale for airliners. The growth of the hobby launched a number of competitors such as Matchbox and introduced new manufacturers from Japan and the US to the UK.

During this period the Humbrol company grew, supplying paints, brushes, glue and other accessories as an alternative to Airfix's own range. Airfix also launched a monthly modelling magazine, Airfix Magazine, produced by a variety of publishers from June 1960 to October 1993. During the 1970s, an Airfix Magazine Annual was produced, and Airfix books on classic aircraft, classic ships and modelling techniques were published by Patrick Stephens Ltd.

In 1963, the Airfix slot car racing system was introduced. Airfix produced cars with front-wheel Ackermann steering and, later, conversion kits so that normal Airfix 1/32 kit cars such as the Ford Zodiac and the Sunbeam Rapier could be raced. The first set had Ferrari and Cooper cars and an 11-foot figure-of-eight track: it cost £4/19/11d. Always in the shadow of the Scalextric range, the Airfix version attempted to progress with the higher-end Model Road Racing Company (MRRC) range but eventually the venture was abandoned.

Most of Airfix's older range of military vehicles, though sold as 1/72, are generally accepted as OO or 1/76 scale. The introduction of a small number of true 1/72 vehicle kits to the Airfix range created controversy regarding the exact scale. Hornby's new packaging shows 1/72 or 1/76 as appropriate.

In late 1962, the acquisition of the intellectual property and 35 moulds of Rosebud Kitmaster gave Airfix its first models of railway locomotives in OO and HO scales and its first motorcycle kit, the Ariel Arrow in 1/16 scale. The 1960s also saw the introduction of a line of boxed 1/72 scale military figures.

In the mid-1970s, larger scales were introduced, including detailed 1/24-scale models of the Spitfire, Messerschmitt Bf 109, Hawker Hurricane and Harrier "jump-jet". The mid-1970s were a peak time for Airfix. Releasing as many as 17 new kits a year, Airfix commanded 75% of the UK market with 20 million kits per annum. Series 20 was limited for several years to the 1972 1/12 scale kit of the 1930 Supercharged Bentley 4½ Litre car, with 272 parts and the option of a 3-volt motor. In 1979 four motorcycles in 1/8 scale were added to this series. The company also introduced an addition to the plastic soldier boxed set line with a 1/32 scale version.

During this period, as well as model kits, Airfix also produced a wide range of toys, games, dolls and art & craft products. It was still producing other plastic products such as homewares at this time. Airfix Industries acquired part of the failing Lines Brothers' Tri-ang toy business, then in voluntary liquidation, giving it the Meccano and Dinky Toys businesses in 1971. This made Airfix the UK's largest toy company.

=== Decline, purchase by Humbrol ===
In the 1980s, Airfix Industries group was under financial pressure, there were losses in Airfix's other toy businesses, and attempts to reduce costs were met with industrial action. The pound strengthened from US$1.56 to US$2.35 in a matter of months, destroying export markets, because customers were unwilling to accept a 50% price increase for the same goods. The financial interdependency of the divisions of Airfix Industries forced it to declare bankruptcy in 1981.

The company was bought by General Mills (owner of US automobile kit-maker MPC) through its UK Palitoy subsidiary. The kit moulds were sent to their factory in Calais, France. Later, Airfix aircraft kits were marketed in the United States under the MPC label and some MPC kits were sold in the UK under the Airfix name, an example being the 1/25 scale vintage Stutz Bearcat kit originally produced as a tie-in to the Bearcats! television series. Airfix released MPC kits based on the Star Wars film series.

Airfix's market share reduced to 40% of the UK market (2.3 million kits) though it had 75% of the German market. In the US, where automobile kits were more popular than aircraft, it was less than 2%.

Four years later, General Mills withdrew from the toy market to focus on its core food manufacturing business. At one point, it looked as if the Airfix range might be discontinued with no new toolings released from 1986 to 1987. Eventually around this time, it was bought by the Hobby Products Group of Borden, Inc., which had tried to buy the range in 1981. Borden was also the owner of Humbrol. The moulds remained in France but were relocated to the group's existing kit-manufacturer, Trun-based Heller SA. This was a logical acquisition since Humbrol's paints and adhesives could be used to complete Airfix kits and the Heller factory was under-utilised.

In 1994, the Hobby Products Group was sold to an Irish investment company, Allen & McGuire, and continued under the Humbrol name.

=== 50th anniversary ===
In 2003, Airfix celebrated the 50th anniversary of its first aircraft kit, the Supermarine Spitfire. The celebration was two years early because of an incorrect 1953 date commonly accepted at the time. As the moulds for the original kit were long gone, Airfix reissued its 1/72 Supermarine Spitfire Mk.Ιa kit in blue plastic. The kit also included a large Series 5 stand, the moulds for the smaller Series 1 stand having been lost, and a copy of the original plastic bag packaging with paper header.

=== Demise of Humbrol and acquisition by Hornby ===
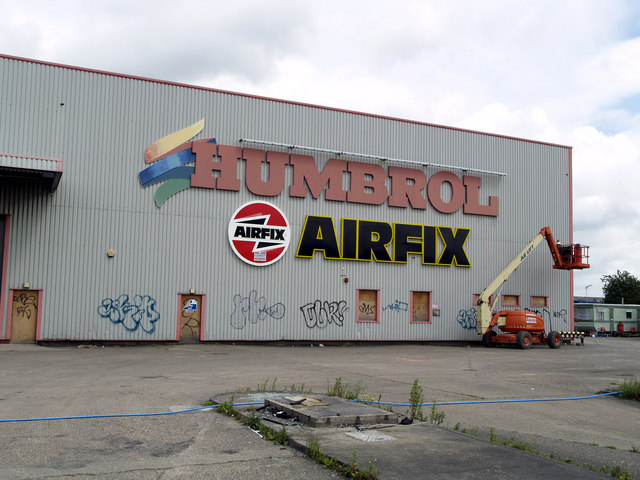
The former Humbrol factory in Kingston upon Hull

In August 2006, parent company Humbrol went into administration, 31 of 41 employees being made redundant, largely because of the collapse of Heller SA, which still manufactured most of Airfix's kits. In November 2006, Hornby Hobbies Ltd. announced it was to acquire Airfix and other assets of Humbrol for £2.6 million, and relaunched the brands in 2007. In 2008, Airfix's former factory in Kingston upon Hull was demolished.

=== Hornby era ===
Under the management of Hornby, Airfix was revitalised. Old ranges were re-issued, and Airfix launched several new kits annually. Most manufacturing of Airfix products is in India, while design and packing is in the UK.

=== Ownership and production summary ===
Period	Ownership	Main manufacturing base	Comments
1939–1981	Airfix Industries Ltd, UK	Haldane Place, Wandsworth, London, UK	Collaboration in later years with MPC (USA) and Gunze Sangyo (Japan)
1981–1985	General Mills Inc, USA through CPG Products Corporation	Miro Meccano factory, Calais, France	Range largely shared with MPC (USA) also owned by General Mills.
1986–1994	Borden Inc, USA through Humbrol Ltd	Heller factory, Trun, France	Many Airfix kits were reboxed Heller kits, also owned by Humbrol.
1994–2006	Allen & McGuire, Ireland, through Humbrol Ltd	Heller factory, Trun, France	Many Airfix kits were reboxed Heller kits, also owned by Humbrol until 2006. Several Japanese and Chinese kits reboxed too.
2006–present	Hornby plc, UK	Outsourced to India	Focus on self-produced kits. Limited reboxing.

== Box art ==
Many artists have produced artwork for Airfix kit packaging, most famously Roy Cross.

== Model railways ==
In 1962, Airfix bought from Rosebud Kitmaster Ltd, its moulds and stock for the Kitmaster railway range. The models were adapted to be compatible with Airfix's rolling stock models produced from 1960 which went with Airfix's trackside accessories of a few years earlier. Only ten of the Kitmaster locomotives were released under Airfix.

From 1975 to 1981, Airfix manufactured a line of ready-to-run models of British railway stock in OO gauge (1/76.2 scale). Their details and accuracy were an improvement on rival products from other British manufacturers such as Hornby. The product range expanded rapidly. A model of a Great Western Railway (GWR) 0-4-2 autotank steam locomotive and GWR auto coach are amongst some of the many memorable and important product releases. Airfix also offered an analogue electronics-based multiple train control system (MTC) allowing independent control of locomotives on the same track. Airfix produced a large number of plastic kits for railway stock and scenic items. Some of these such as the footbridge and engine shed became instantly recognisable to almost every railway modeller in the UK.

In 1979, the brand label was changed to Great Model Railways (GMR), although the Airfix name was still included. In 1981, Airfix left the model railway business. The models were sold to one of its main competitors Palitoy, which produced the Mainline range of products. The former Airfix moulds and the Palitoy-designed 2P 4-4-0 and Class 56 diesel were later re-sold to Dapol Ltd and then to Hornby. Dapol provided new chassis for the 14xx and Castle.

The remainder of the Mainline Railways had been produced for Palitoy by Kader Industries. Ownership of those tools remained with Kader, and formed the basis of the Bachmann Branchline models. Dapol continues to produce, but not promote most of the kits. As the moulds, some now over forty years old, wear out, the kits are being discontinued. Hornby continues to make 4 mm/ft scale models from the Airfix mouldings.

From January 1980, a monthly magazine, Model Trains was published by Airfix. The magazine included especially good articles aimed at newcomers to the hobby and included many articles about modelling US and Continental European railways, as well as British prototype railways. The publication of Model Trains continued for some years after Airfix ceased ownership in 1981.

In April 1982, a change in the editorial team saw the original Model Trains editorial staff launch a new title as Scale Trains. In April 1984, the name became Scale Model Trains, following the final issue of Model Trains in December 1983. Scale Model Trains ran until June 1995, when a new publisher was found. In 1995, the magazine was relaunched as Model Trains International, the November/December issue being issue number 1. It continues to be published.

== Video game ==
In 2000, EON Digital Entertainment released Airfix Dogfighter for Microsoft Windows. The game featured computer representation of Airfix's Second World War-era model aircraft with a total of over 15 playable aircraft, including the German Messerschmitt Me 163 Komet, and the American Grumman F6F Hellcat. The game featured 20 missions, allowing players to play 10 missions as both the Axis and Allies. Players fought their way through the game's 1950s-era house, destroying enemy planes while trying to collect healing glue packets, new model kits, weapons schematics, and paint to customise their aircraft for online battles.

Pilots would battle enemy model aircraft as well as U-boats, warships, tanks, flak guns, airships, and fortresses. Players could design their own fighting emblem, call sign, and even their own battle maps based on the missions in the game. The whole game was an advertising venture, as the paints are Humbrol and the kit upgrades show actual pictures of Airfix packages.

== In popular culture ==
The Airfix history has ensured that the company, its products and its brand has entered modern culture, especially in the Anglo-centric world, in its own right. In 2008, a TV advertisement for the Santander bank was produced, featuring a fictitious Lewis Hamilton Formula One car model. Demand for this model was such that Airfix later produced a real model kit using the tooling from a similar Scalextric slot car.

In 2009, a life-size model of a Spitfire in the style of an Airfix kit was made as part of the BBC TV series James May's Toy Stories. The markings of the life-sized model paid homage to Airfix's first aircraft kit released in 1953, including the erroneous BTK squadron code.

In one of the 'Eric and Ernie at Home' Sketches in the 'Morecambe and Wise Show', Eric Morecambe is seen adding the final touches to the Airfix 1/24 Supermarine Spitfire Mk.1

Airfix kits were frequently used to create details on models of film and television including the Gerry Anderson marionette series of the sixties and Stanley Kubrick's 2001: A Space Odyssey being good examples. The technique was widely embraced by other film makers so Airfix parts can also be found in profusion on many of the models of Star Wars and the Alien franchise.
