= Railway Modeller =

Model railway magazine

- Railway Modeller logo
- Editor and Photographer: Steve Flint
- Former editors: C. J. Freezer, John Brewer, G. H. Lake
- Staff writers: Tim Rayner, Craig Tiley, David Malton, Bob Phelps
- Frequency: Monthly
- Circulation: 29,500 (2022)
- Publisher: Peco Publications
- First issue: 1949
- Country: UK
- Language: English
- Website: This month's issue
- ISSN: 0033-8931

Railway Modeller is a monthly British magazine about model railways, now published by Peco Publications in Beer, Devon. It has been in publication since 1949, with Vol. 1 No. 1 published as The Railway Modeller, an Ian Allan Production for October–November, 1949. It is still Britain's most popular model railway title. Its first editor was G. H. Lake; the current editor (2025) is Craig Tiley.

== Features ==
The leading feature is the "Railway of the Month". Also included every month are descriptions of other model railway layouts from both individual modellers as well as groups and clubs, together with a scale drawing of either prototype locomotives, coaches, wagons, or buildings and structures. Another established monthly feature is "Plan of the Month", a layout suggestion which may be based on a real or fictional place in the UK. "Shows You How" model-making articles are also included, covering items from building loco kits and rolling stock to scenic items or electrical projects. A special section for the newcomer and less experienced modeller is included under the title of "Railway Modelling Explored"

Other regular monthly features are "Latest Reviews," in which the latest products, books, and videos/DVDs are reviewed; "News," which brings the latest stories from the world of model railways and preserved railways in the UK; and "Societies and Clubs," which provides the most comprehensive listings of railway modelling and model railway exhibitions, events, and meetings available.

"Scale Drawings" is a monthly feature to which Ian Beattie contributed regularly with his "Drawn and Described" articles covering UK railway locomotives until his death in 2000. Today, the feature includes locos, rolling stock, and lineside buildings, all drawn to scale, usually 4 mm - ft.

== Continental Modeller ==
A sister publication, Continental Modeller, covers modelling of foreign subjects, but is still aimed mostly at modellers based in the UK.

== See also ==
- List of railroad-related periodicals
- C. J. Freezer, editor (1950–1978)
