= HO scale =

Model railroad scale of 1:87

HO (H0)
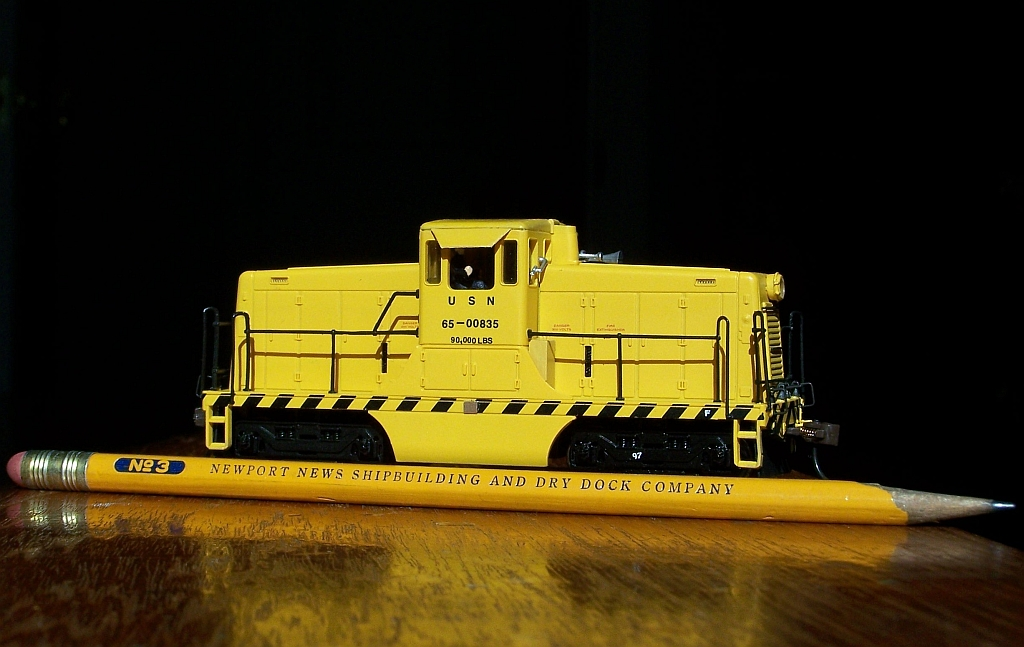
- HO-scale (1:87) model of a center cab switcher locomotive made by Bachmann, shown with a pencil for size comparison.
- Scale: 3.5 mm to 1 ft (305 mm)
- Scale ratio: 1:87 (world); 1:80 (Japan)
- Standard(s): NEM 010; NMRA S-1.2
- Model gauge: 16.5 mm (0.65 in)
- Prototype gauge: Standard gauge

HO or H0 is a rail transport modelling scale using a 1:87 scale (3.5 mm to 1 foot). It is the most popular scale of model railway in the world. The rails are spaced 16.5 millimetres (0.650 in) apart for modelling 1,435 mm (4 ft 8 1/2 in) standard-gauge tracks and trains in HO.

The name HO comes from 1:87 scale being half that of O scale, which was originally the smallest of the series of older and larger 0, 1, 2 and 3 gauges introduced by Märklin around 1900. Rather than referring to the scale as "half-zero" or "H-zero", English-speakers have consistently pronounced it /eɪtʃ oʊ/ and have generally written it with the letters HO. In other languages it also remains written with the letter H and number 0 (zero); in German it is thus pronounced as [ha: 'nʊl]. In Japan, many models are produced using 1:80 scale (16.5 mm track is still used).

== History ==
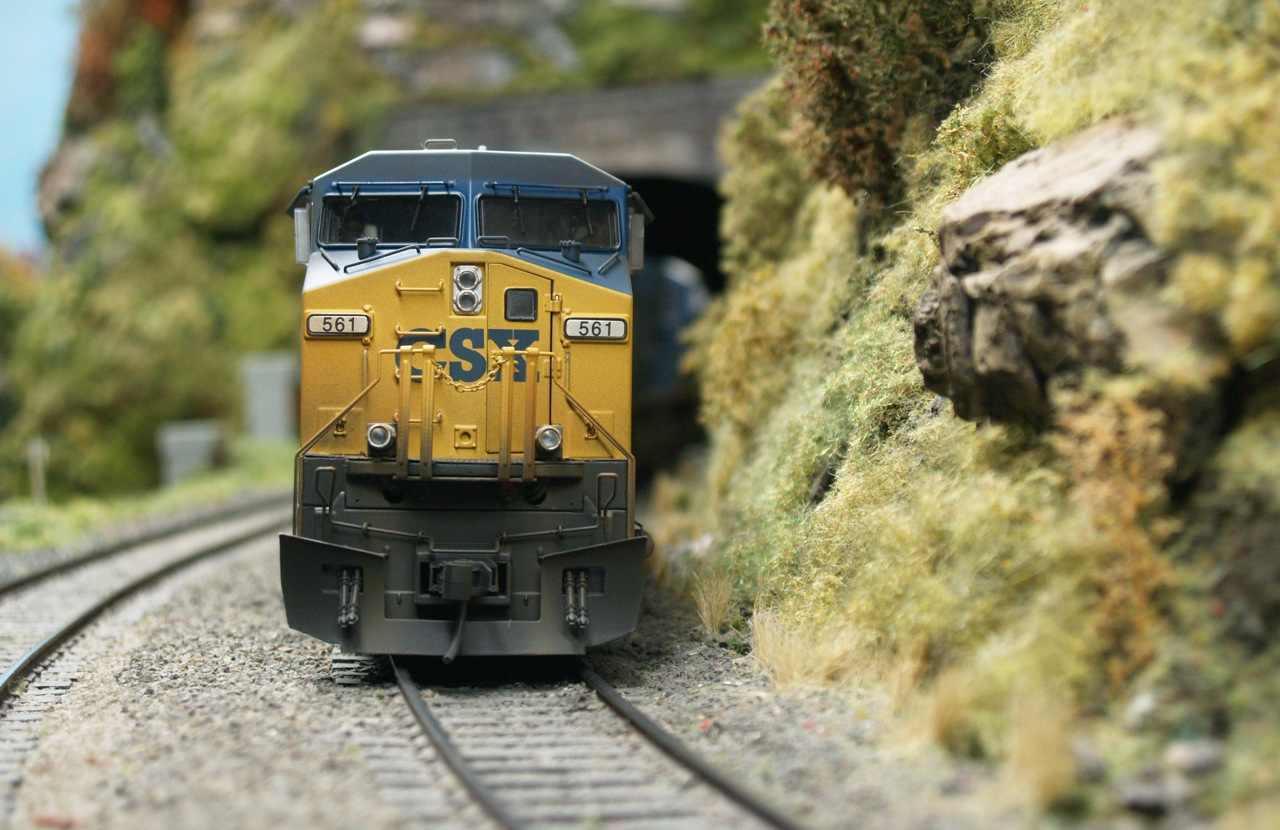
HO-scale model of a CSX locomotive

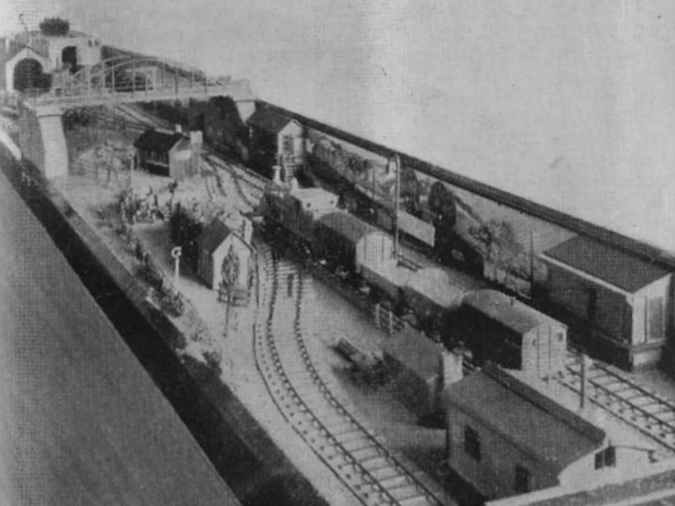
First model railroad layouts in today's H0 gauge, 1926

After the First World War there were several attempts to introduce a model railway about half the size of 0 scale that would be more suitable for smaller home layouts and cheaper to manufacture. H0 was created to meet these aims. For this new scale, a track width of 16.5 mm (0.65 in) was designed to represent prototypical standard-gauge track of 1,435 mm (4 ft 8.5 in) width, and a model scale of 1:87 was chosen. By as early as 1922 the firm Bing in Nuremberg, Germany, had been marketing a "tabletop railway" for several years. This came on a raised, quasi-ballasted track with a gauge of 16.5 mm, which was described at that time either as 00 or H0. The trains initially had a clockwork drive, but from 1924 were driven electrically. Accessory manufacturers, such as Kibri, marketed buildings in the corresponding scale.

At the 1935 Leipzig Spring Fair, an electric tabletop railway, Trix Express, was displayed to a gauge described as "half nought gauge", which was then abbreviated as gauge 00 ("nought-nought"). Märklin, another German firm, followed suit with its 00-gauge railway for the 1935 Leipzig Autumn Fair. The Märklin 00-gauge track that appeared more than ten years after Bing's tabletop railway had a very similar appearance to the previous Bing track. On the Märklin version, however, the rails were fixed to the tin 'ballast' as in the prototype, while the Bing tracks were simply stamped into the ballast, so that track and ballast were made of a single sheet of metal.

HO-scale trains elsewhere were developed in response to the economic pressures of the Great Depression. The trains first appeared in the United Kingdom, originally as an alternative to 00 gauge, but could not make commercial headway against the established 00 gauge. However, it became very popular in the United States, where it took off in the late 1950s after interest in model railroads as toys began to decline and more emphasis began to be placed on realism in response to hobbyist demand. While HO scale is by nature more delicate than O scale, its smaller size allows modelers to fit more details and more scale track distance into a comparable area.

In the 1950s HO began to challenge the market dominance of O gauge and, in the 1960s, as it began to overtake O scale in popularity, even the stalwarts of other sizes, including Marx and Lionel Corporation, began manufacturing HO trains.

Today, HO locomotives, rolling stock (cars or carriages), buildings, and scenery are available from a large number of manufacturers in a variety of price brackets.

== Standards ==
=== Scale ===
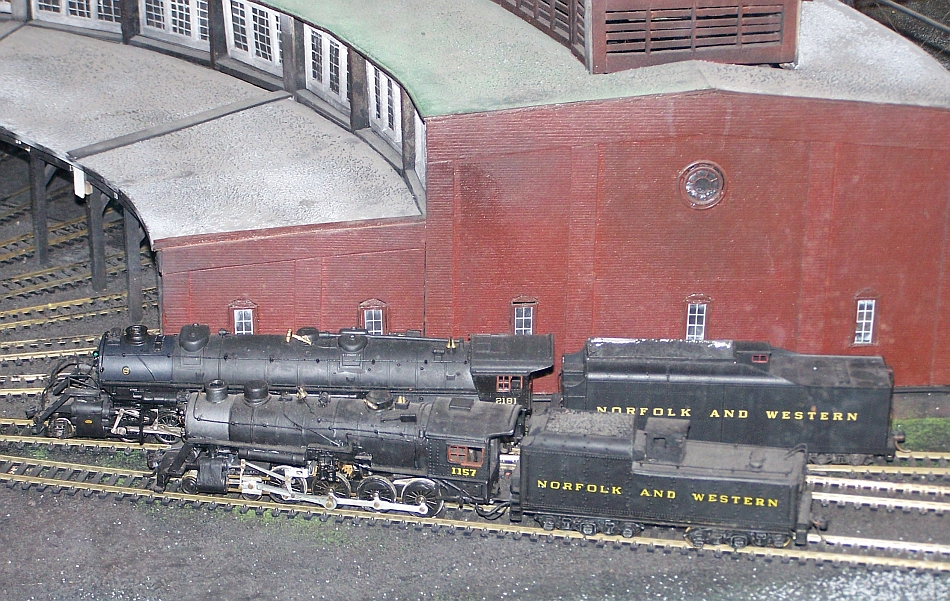
HO-scale steam locomotives at the N&W RR museum in Crewe, Virginia.

HO is the most popular model railroad scale in both continental Europe and North America, whereas OO scale (4 mm:foot or 1:76.2 with 16.5 mm track) is still dominant in the United Kingdom. There are some modellers in the United Kingdom who model in HO scale and the British 1:87 Scale Society was formed in 1994.

In continental Europe, H0 scale is defined in the Normen Europäischer Modellbahnen (NEM) standard "NEM 010" published by MOROP as exactly 1:87. In North America, the National Model Railroad Association (NMRA) standard "S-1.2 General Standard Scales" defines HO scale as 3.5 mm (0.1378 in) representing 1 real foot (304.8 mm) – a ratio of 1:87.08̅5̅7̅1̅4̅2̅, usually rounded to 1:87.1. The precise definition of HO scale thus varies slightly by country and manufacturer.

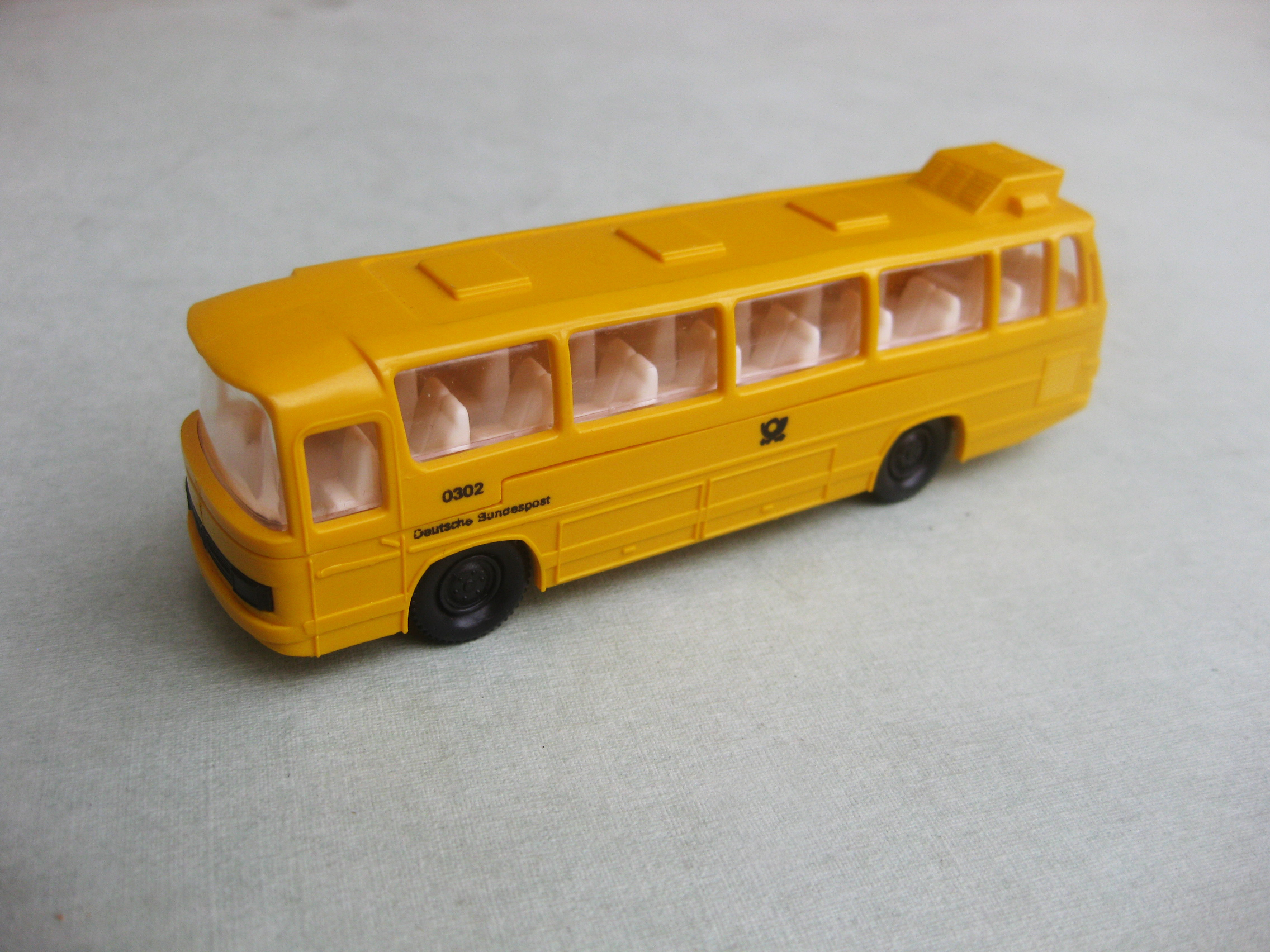
Advertising gift of a Mercedes bus in HO

In other hobbies, the term HO is often used more loosely than in railroad modeling. In slot car racing, HO does not denote a precise scale of car, but a general size of track on which the cars can range from 1:87 to approximately 1:64 scale. Small plastic model soldiers are often popularly referred to as HO size if they are close to one inch (25 mm) high, though the actual scale is usually 1:76 or 1:72.

Even in model railroading, the term HO can be stretched. Some British producers have marketed railway accessories such as detail items and figures, as "HO/OO" in an attempt to make them attractive to modelers in both scales. Sometimes the actual scale is OO, and sometimes the difference is split (about 1:82). These items may be marketed as HO, especially in the US. In addition, some manufacturers or importers tend to label any small-scale model, regardless of exact scale, as HO scale in order to increase sales to railroad modelers. The sizes of "HO" automobiles, for example, can vary greatly between different manufacturers.

=== Power and control ===
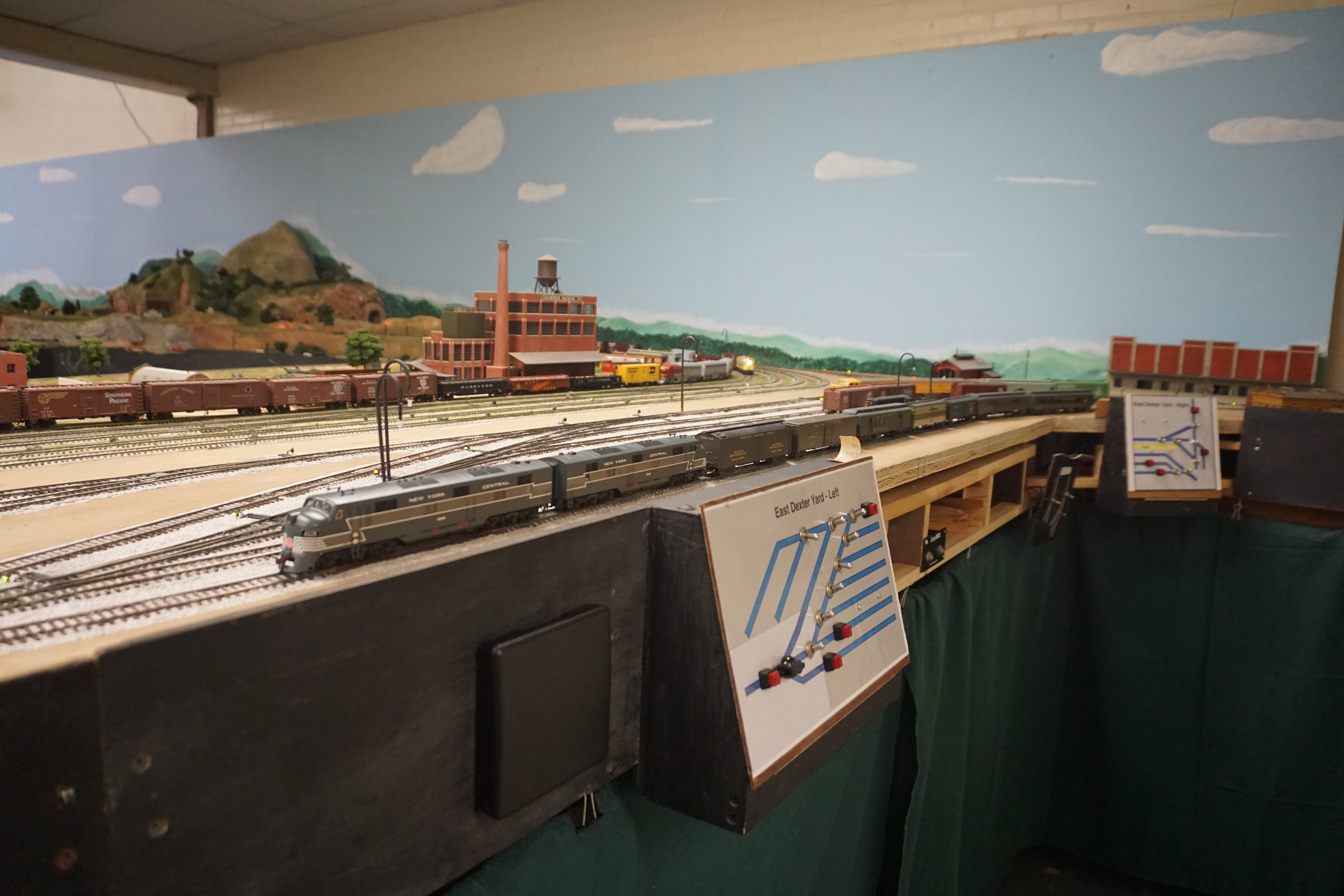
East Texas Model Railroad Club HO-scale layout's yard switch controls

Model locomotives are fitted with small motors that are wired to pick up power from the rails. As with other scales, HO trains can be controlled in either analog or digital fashions. With analog control, two-rail track is powered by direct current (varying the voltage applied to the rails to control speed, and polarity to control direction). With digital control, such as Digital Command Control (DCC) or proprietary systems such as the one developed by Märklin, digital commands are encoded at the controller and received by any decoders receiving power from the track. Digital control allows independent control of each locomotive's speed and direction as well as functions not easily achieved with analog control such as reactive sound and lighting effects, integration of auxiliary decoders and automation.

The basic power and control system consists of a power pack of a transformer and rectifier (DC), a rheostat. On large model layouts, the power system may consist of several signal boosters, control interfaces, switch panels and more. Trackage may be divided into electrically isolated sections called blocks and toggle or rotary switches (sometimes relays) are used to select which tracks are energized. Blocking trackage also allows the detection of locomotives within the block through the measurement of current draw.

=== Track ===
The gauge of a rail system is the distance between the inside edges of the railheads. It is distinct from the concept of scale, though the terms are often used interchangeably in rail modelling. Scale describes the size of a modeled object relative to its prototype. Prototype rail systems use a variety of track gauges, so several different gauges can be modeled at the same scale.

The gauges used in HO scale are a selection of standard and narrow gauges. The standards for these gauges are defined by the NMRA (in North America) and the NEM (in Continental Europe). While the standards are in practice interchangeable, there are minor differences.

Track gauges used in HO/H0-scale modelling
Track gauge	NEM	NMRA	Prototype gauge	Picture	Notes
16.5 mm (0.65 in)	H0	HO	Standard gauge		The most common gauge. The 16.5 mm (0.65 in) gauge is additionally used for standard-gauge trains in British 1:76 OO gauge, and for narrow gauges by 1:60 or 1:64 Sm and 1:64 Sn3½, 1:48 On30, On2½ and 1:22.5 Gn15.
12 mm (0.472 in)	H0m	HOn3½	Metre gauge (1,000 mm) and 3 ft 6 in (1,067 mm) gauge, also 900 mm and 950 mm gauge		Metre gauge (1,000 mm) is common in France, Germany, Switzerland, West and East Africa, parts of other countries and many tram lines. 3 ft 6 in (1,067 mm) gauge is used in southern Africa, Australia (Queensland, Tasmania, and Western Australia), New Zealand, and also most non-Shinkansen lines in Japan. Meterspur, defined in the NEM 010 for modelling 850 to 1250 mm gauge. H0m and HOn3½ can use commercially available TT-scale track.
10.5 mm (0.413 in)		HOn3	3 ft (914 mm) gauge		3 ft (914 mm) gauge once common to American mining railroads and shortlines, particularly in the Western States
9 mm (0.354 in)	H0e	HOn30	2 ft 6 in (762 mm) gauge		Engspur. Typically used for lines in 2 ft (610 mm)-2 ft 6 in (762 mm) gauge. Uses commercially available N-scale track.
7 mm (0.28 in)		HOn2	18 in (457 mm)–2 ft (610 mm) gauge		2 ft and 600 mm gauge systems. HOn2 uses 7 mm (0.276 in).
6.5 mm (0.26 in)	H0i		18 in (457 mm)–2 ft (610 mm) gauge		In German-speaking countries instead of the additional letter i (Industriebahn, "industrial railroad") the letter f (Feldbahn, "field railroad") can be used. H0i can uses commercially available Z-scale track. Defined in NEM 010 for modelling 400–650-millimetre (16–26 in) gauge including 2 ft and 600 mm gauge trench- or light railway systems.
4.5 mm (0.177 in)	H0p		12 in (305 mm)‒15 in (381 mm)		Parkbahn, ridable miniature railways, Defined in NEM 010 for modelling 300–400-millimetre (10–15 in) gauge.

==== Construction ====
A simple HO-scale model railroad, consisting of three interconnected modules, each 70 × 100 cm in size

The earliest "pre-gauged" track available in the 1940s had steel rails clipped to a fiber tie base. This was called flexible track as it could be "flexed" around any curve in a continuous fashion. The sections were sold in lengths of 3 feet (91 cm), and the rail ends were connected with a sheet metal track connector that was soldered to the base of the rail.

As brass became more readily available, the steel rail was phased out, along with its corrosion problems. Brass flex-track continued to be available long after sectional track was introduced, as the three-foot lengths of rail reduced the number of joints. The biggest disadvantage of flex-track was that it had to be fastened to a roadbed.

In the late 1940s, Tru-Scale made milled wood roadbed sections, simulating ballast, tie plates and milled ties with a gauged, grooved slot with simulated tie plates. Bulk HO code 100 rail was spiked in place with HO spikes. This was available in straight lengths and curves, from 18-to-36-inch (460 to 910 mm) radius. It was up to the user to stain the wood for the tie colors prior to laying the brass track, and then adding scale ballast between the ties.

Tru-Scale made preformed wood roadbed sections, simulating ballast, that the flextrack would be fastened with tiny steel spikes. These spikes were shaped much like real railroad spikes, and were fitted through holes pre-drilled in the fiber flextrack ties base. An improvement was made when "sectional track" became available in a variety of standardized lengths, such as the ubiquitous 9-inch (230 mm) straight and curved tracks with radii of 15, 18 and 22 inches (380, 460 and 560 mm). These are representative of curves as tight as 108 feet (33 m), which in the real world would only be found on some industrial spurs and light rail systems.

Sectional track was an improvement in setting up track on a living room floor because the rail was attached to a rigid plastic tie base, and could withstand rough handling from children and pets without suffering much damage. With flex track, which can be bent to any desired shape (within reason), it became possible to create railroads with broader curves, and with them more accurate models. Individual rails are available for those that wish to spike their own rails to ties. Individual ties can be glued to a sound base, or pre-formed tie and ballast sections milled from wood can be used for a more durable, if somewhat artificially uniform, look is preferred.

There are a variety of pre-assembled track sections made by Märklin using their three-rail system (where the third rail are actually studs protruding from the center of the rail tie). This track work is a little bulkier looking than true to scale, but it is considered quite trouble-free, and is preferred by many that are interested in reducing much of the operational problems that come with HO-scale railroading. As with other preformed track, it is also available in several radius configurations. Generally speaking, very-sharp-radius curves are only suitable for single-unit operation, such as trolley cars, or for short-coupled cars and locos such as found around industrial works. Longer wheelbase trucks (bogies) and longer car and loco overhangs require the use of broader radius curves. Today many six-axle diesels and full-length passenger cars will not run on curves less than 24 inches (610 mm) in radius.

HO-scale track was originally manufactured with steel rails on fiber ties, then brass rail on fiber ties, then brass rail on plastic tie. Over time, track made of nickel silver (an alloy of nickel and brass) became more common due to its superior resistance to corrosion. Today, almost all HO-scale track is of nickel silver, although Bachmann, Life-Like and Model Power continue to manufacture steel track.

In America, Atlas gained an early lead in track manufacturing, and their sectional, flex, and turnout track dominates the US market. In the UK, Peco's line of flex track and "Electrofrog" (powered frog) and "Insulfrog" (insulated frog) turnouts are more common. Atlas, Bachmann, and Life-Like all manufacture inexpensive, snap-together track with integral roadbed. Kato also manufactures a full line of "HO Unitrack"; however, it has not yet caught on as their N-scale Unitrack has.

Rail height is measured in thousandths of an inch; "code 83" track has a rail which is 0.083 inches (2.1 mm) high. As HO's commonly available rail sizes, especially the popular "code 100", are somewhat large (representative of extremely heavily trafficked lines), many modelers opt for hand-laid finescale track with individually laid wooden sleepers and crossties and rails secured by very small railroad spikes.

In Australia, many club-owned layouts employ code 100 track so that club members can also run OO-scale models and older rolling stock with coarse (deep) wheel flanges.

=== Couplers ===
A hook-and-loop coupler originally developed by Märklin became an NEM standard and is still widely used. In the mid-1980s manufacturers, including Fleischmann and Märklin, developed close couplers that on straight track have the buffers almost touching, more like the prototype. On curves a sliding mechanism allows the couplers to move away from the buffer frame providing the additional clearance necessary.

Most couplers provide pre-uncoupling, whereby a train may reverse over a raised uncoupler and some time later change direction leaving the train (or selected cars) behind.

Another NEM standard is the coupler pocket, which the individual coupler slots into. The majority of models provide this pocket, meaning that it is very simple to exchange one coupler type for another, or to replace damaged couplers.

In North America, all train sets/kits used to come with the "X2F" or "Horn Hook" coupler until Kadee came out with the No. 5 coupler. After Kadee's patent ran out, other manufacturers made duplicates of the KD No. 5 until KD brought out the scale-accurate No. 58 coupler, and everyone else followed suit.

In Australia, older models produced by Lima and Powerline traditionally used NEM hook-and-loop couplers, however almost all models since the mid-1990s use Kadee or compatible couplers such as Bachmann E-Z Mate. Older Australian-market train sets manufactured by Tyco, Life-Like and Bachmann used the same horn hook couplers as their American counterparts.

== Models ==
Because of the scale's popularity, a huge array of models, kits and supplies are manufactured. The annual HO-scale catalog by Wm. K. Walthers, North America's largest model railroad supplier, lists more than 1,000 pages of products in that scale alone. Models are generally available in three varieties:

- Ready-to-run models are fully ready for use right out of the box. Generally, this means couplers, trucks (bogies), and other integral parts are installed at the factory, although some super detailing parts may still need to be attached.
- Shake-the-box kits are simple, easy-to-assemble kits; a freight car might include a one-piece body, a chassis, trucks, couplers, and a weight, while a structure kit might include walls, windows, doors, and glazing. The name derives from the joke that no skill was required – shake the box, and the kit falls together. A common synonym is screwdriver kit as many can be assembled with a screwdriver and tweezers.
- Craftsman kits require a much higher level of skill to assemble and can include several hundred parts.

In addition to these kits, numerous manufacturers sell individual supplies for super detailing, scratch building, and kitbashing.

Quality varies extremely. Toylike, ready-to-run trains using plastic molds which are well over 50 years old are still sold; at the other are highly detailed limited-edition locomotive models made of brass by companies based in Japan and South Korea. A popular locomotive such as the F7/F9 may be available in thirty different versions with prices ranging from twenty to several thousand dollars or euros.

== Comparison to other scales ==
HO scale's popularity lies somewhat in its middle-of-the-road status. It is large enough to accommodate a great deal of detail in finer models, more so than the smaller N and Z scales, and can also be easily handled by children. Models are usually less expensive than the smaller scales because of more exacting manufacturing process in N and Z, and also less expensive than S, O and G scales because of the smaller amount of material; the larger market and the resultant economy of scale also drives HO prices down. The size lends itself to elaborate track plans in a reasonable amount of room space, not as much as N but considerably more than S or 0 scales. In short, HO scale provides the balance between the detail of larger scales and the lower space requirements of smaller scales.

== Manufacturers ==
Currently active significant manufacturers and marketers of HO railroad equipment as of 2009 include:

- ABR Model Works
- Accurail
- Acme Model Engineering Co.
- Albrae Models
- Arlo
- Athabasca Scale Models
- Athearn
- Atlas
- Atma ATMA
- Auhagen
- Auscision
- Austrains
- AWM
- Bachmann Industries
- BGR Group
- BEMO Modelleisenbahnen
- Blackstone Models (HOn3)
- Blair Line
- BLMA Models
- Bowser Manufacturing
- Brawa
- Brekina
- Broadway Limited Imports
- Busch
- Campbell Scale Models
- Century Foundry
- Egger-Bahn
- Electrotren (part of Hornby)
- ESU (Electronic Solutions Ulm)
- Eureka
- Exactrail
- Faller
- Fleischmann (part of Modelleisenbahn GmbH)
- Frateschi
- Fulgurex
- HAG
- Heki
- Heljan
- Herpa
- Hodgdon Scale Models
- Hornby Railways
- Hunterline Craftsman Kits
- Ibertren
- InterMountain Railway
- IHC
- Island Modelworks
- Jouef (part of Hornby)
- Kadee
- Kanamodel Products
- Kato Precision Railroad Models
- Katsumi Trains
- Kibri
- Kleinbahn
- Lemaco
- Life-Like
- Liliput (part of Bachmann)
- Lima — bankrupt in 2004, now part of Hornby
- Lionel, LLC
- Mantua
- Märklin
- Mehano
- Micro Metakit
- Minitrains
- Model Power
- MTH Electric Trains
- Musashino Model
- MRmatiX
- Noch
- NMJ
- Norev
- Northwest Short Line (NWSL)
- Peco
- PIKO
- Powerline Models
- Precision Craft Models
- Preiser
- Rapido Trains
- Rietze
- Rivarossi (part of Hornby)
- Roco (part of Modelleisenbahn GmbH)
- ScaleTrains
- SoundTraxx
- Spectrum (trains) (part of Bachmann)
- Stewart Hobbies
- Spark
- Summit USA
- Tenshodo
- Tillig
- Trix (part of the Märklin group)
- TMI Digital
- Tyco
- VK
- Viessmann
- Vollmer (company)
- Wiking
- Wm. K. Walthers
- Woodland Scenics

Significant historical manufacturers, importers, and marketers of HO equipment that are no longer active in HO include but are not limited to:

- Airfix
- American Railroad Models (American Beauty)
- Aristo-Craft
- Associated Hobby Manufacturers (AHM)
- Aurora Plastics Corporation
- Balboa
- L.M. Cox
- Globe
- Gützold (bankrupt in 2004)
- Herkimer
- Kembel
- Ken Kidder
- Key Imports
- Lindberg Models
- Lindsay Products
- Marx
- Olympic Express
- Overland Models
- Pacific Fast Mail (PFM)
- Penn Line Manufacturing
- PMP
- Powerline Models
- Revell
- Sachsenmodelle (bankrupt in 2001, acquired by Tillig group)
- Selley
- Train Miniature
- Trains Unlimited
- Trainorama
- Tru-Scale
- True Line Trains
- Trumpeter Models
- Tyco Toys
- Ulrich
- Varney Scale Models
- Vollon & Brun
- Westside Model Company

== See also ==
- FREMO
- List of rail transport modelling scale standards
- Miniatur Wunderland
- Proto:87
