= Lemaco =

Lemaco is a brass model railway rolling stock manufacturer based in Switzerland. Lemaco produces models at almost any scale, like HO scale, O scale, N scale, 1 gauge and 2 gauge.

== History ==
After 30 years spent at Fulgurex, Urs Egger founded Lemaco SA in 1985, in Ecublens (Vaud), Switzerland. Later Egger's Lematech SA company was taken over by Lemaco Prestige Models SA. In 2006, the Lemaco company was acquired by Lematec SA.
