= Noch =

Noch may refer to:

- Noch (model railroads), a model railroad company
- Noch (album), a 1986 album by Kino
- Noch, Iran, a village in Mazandaran Province, Iran
- "Noch" (song), a 1984 song by David Tukhmanov
