= Kadee (disambiguation) =

Kadee is a model railroad manufacturer.

Kadee is also the name of:

- KaDee Strickland (born 1975), American actress
- Kadee Leishman, competitor in the 2001 U.S. Figure Skating Championships
