= Swiss made =

Products made in Switzerland

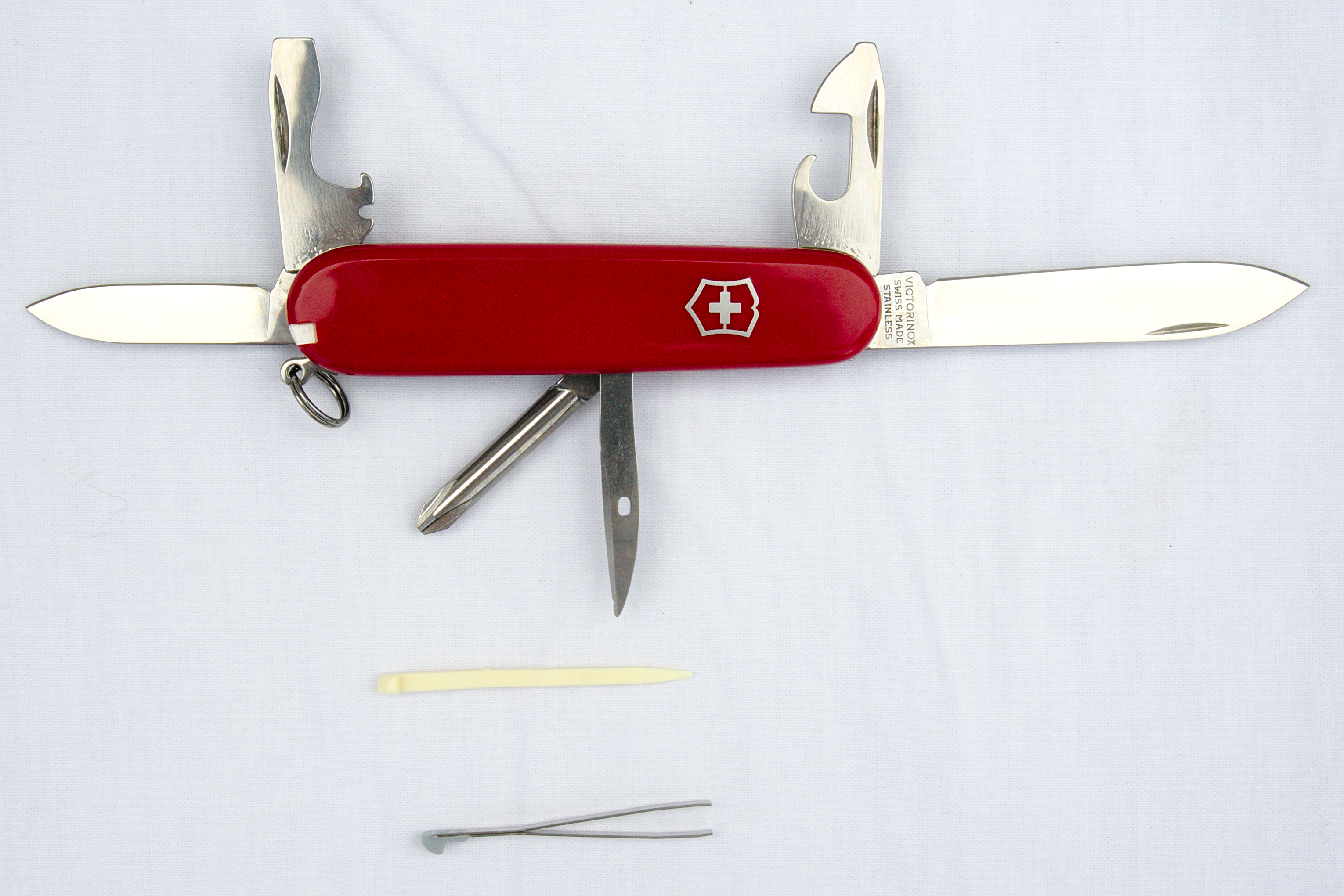
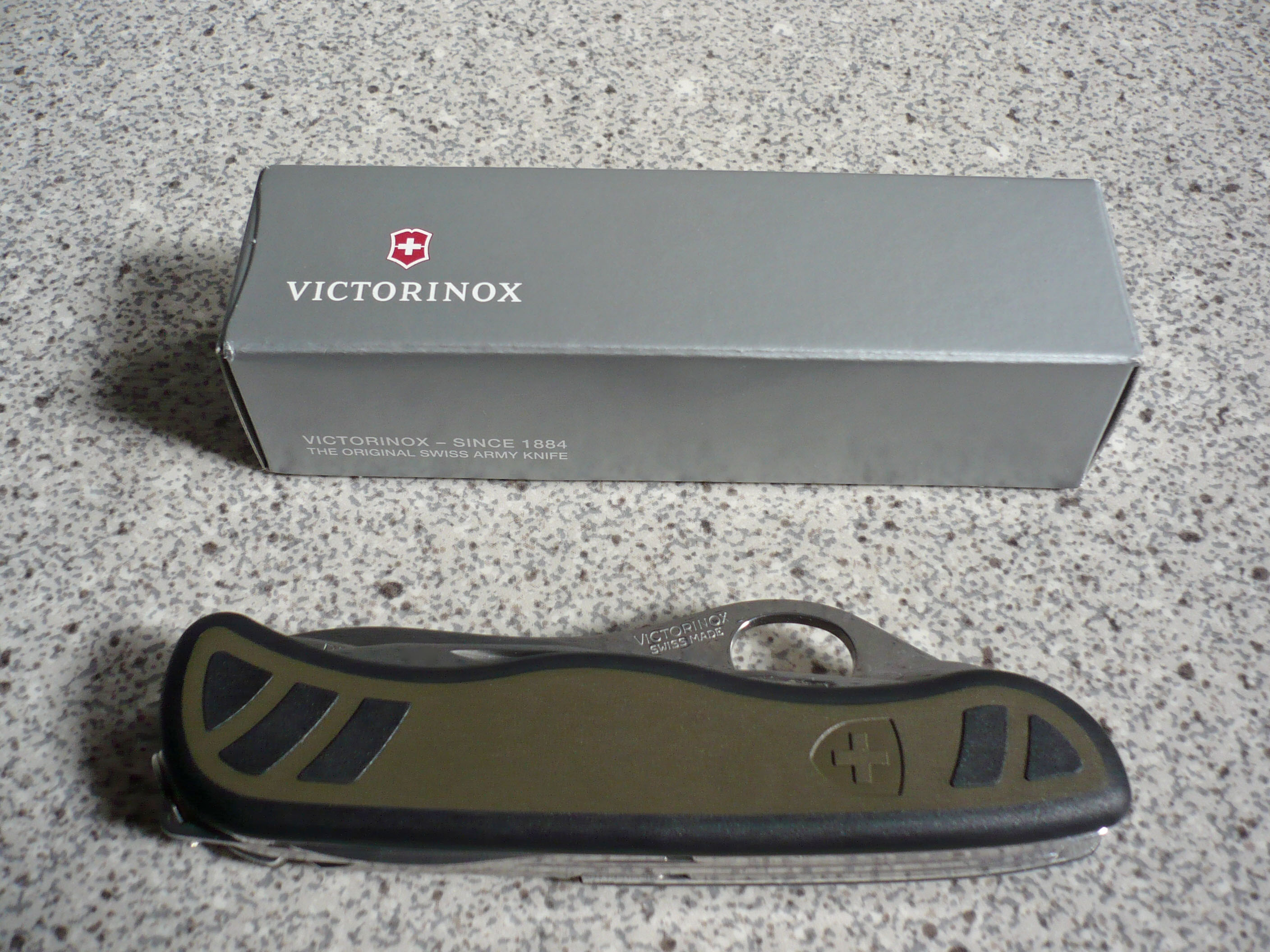
A Swiss Army knife typically has the words "Swiss made" engraved into the knife blade. Considered emblematic of Switzerland, the military grade knife (right) is issued to all new army recruits in the Swiss Armed Forces.
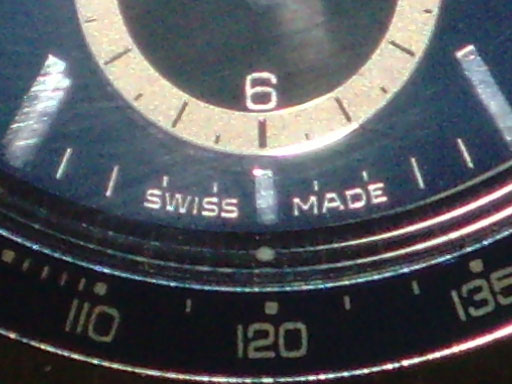
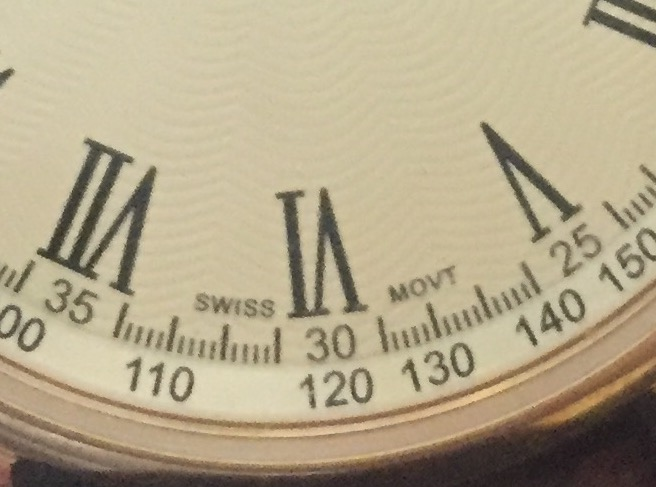
The TAG Heuer chronograph (left) indicates that its "Swiss made" while the automatic (right) indicates the unlawful indication "Swiss Movt".

Swiss made is a label or marking used to indicate that a product was made on the territory of Switzerland. It is also a geographical indication protected under different Swiss and international laws and treaties. According to the Swiss Federal Act on the Protection of Trade Marks and Indications of Source, a good or service may be designated "Swiss made" if:

- For food products: 80% of the weight of the raw materials and the essential processing must take place in Switzerland.
- For industrial products: 60% of the manufacturing costs and 50% of the essential manufacturing step must occur in Switzerland.
- For services: the company headquarters and administration must be located in Switzerland.

Most often associated with watches or timepieces made in Switzerland, Swiss law considers a watch to be Swiss made if its technical development is carried out in Switzerland, its movement is Swiss, if its movement is cased up in Switzerland, if the final inspection of the watch is conducted by the manufacturer in Switzerland, and at least 60 per cent of the manufacturing costs are incurred in Switzerland. These legal criteria are stated in the Ordinance on the Use of «Switzerland» or «Swiss» for Watches. Besides the "Swiss made" requirements, the indication «Swiss movement» may be placed on watches that contain a Swiss movement. The word «movement» must be written in full and must be of the same typeface, size and colour as the designation «Swiss». In addition to "Swiss made", under Swiss law watches may carry the words "Suisse", "produit suisse", "fabriqué en Suisse", "qualité suisse" or simply the English translation, "Swiss" if the legal criteria stated in the abovementioned Ordinance are met.

Outside of the jurisdiction of Switzerland, the same legal requirements for the use of the terms "Swiss" and "Swiss Made" may apply, notably for watches in the European Union, United States and Hong Kong as certification/collective marks "SWISS" are registered.

== History ==
The wording was formally adopted in the late 19th century and is unique in that most other countries use the phrase "Made in (Country Name)". The most obvious place where the label is found is on Swiss watches. The Swiss laws permit the use of the words "Suisse", "produit suisse", "fabriqué en Suisse", "qualité suisse" or the translations, "Swiss", "Swiss made", "Switzerland", only on watches manufactured in Switzerland. The label "Swiss Made" is the more common, but on some older watches, for example, the word "Swiss" appears alone on the dial at the six o'clock position.

There are two sections of the Swiss law that pertain to the use of the name Swiss made. The first law, which applies to all types of Swiss products, is the "Federal Act on the Protection of Trade Marks and Indications of Source". Its article 50 provided the authority for the enactment of the second law, the Ordinance on the Use of «Switzerland» or «Swiss» for Watches, relating specifically to Swiss watches.

== Watches ==
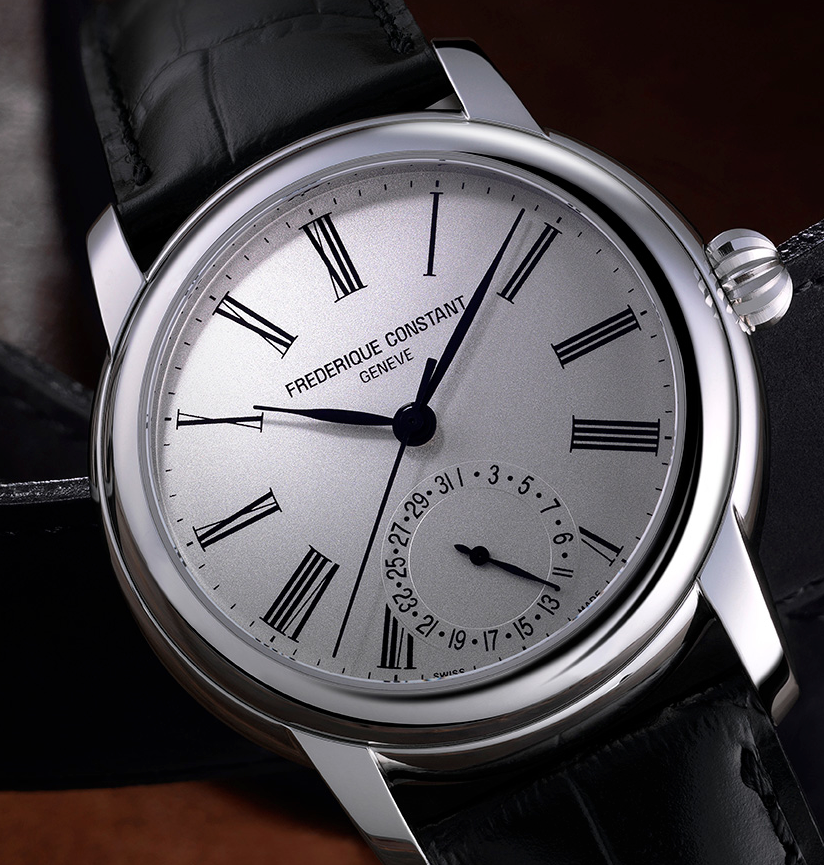
A tiny "Swiss made" label on the bottom of the dial on a Frederique Constant watch

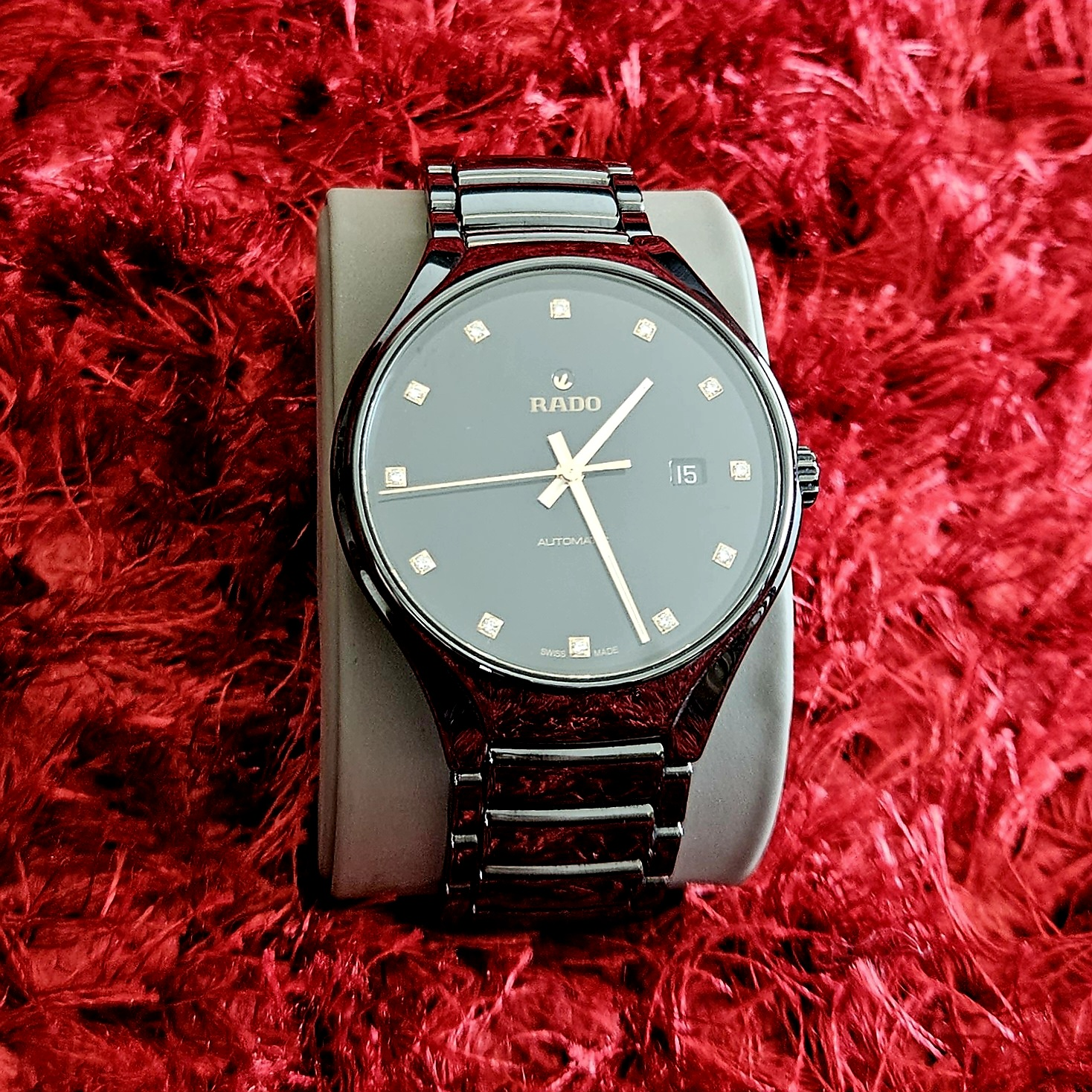
A Rado watch labelled "SWISS MADE" to indicate it is made in Switzerland

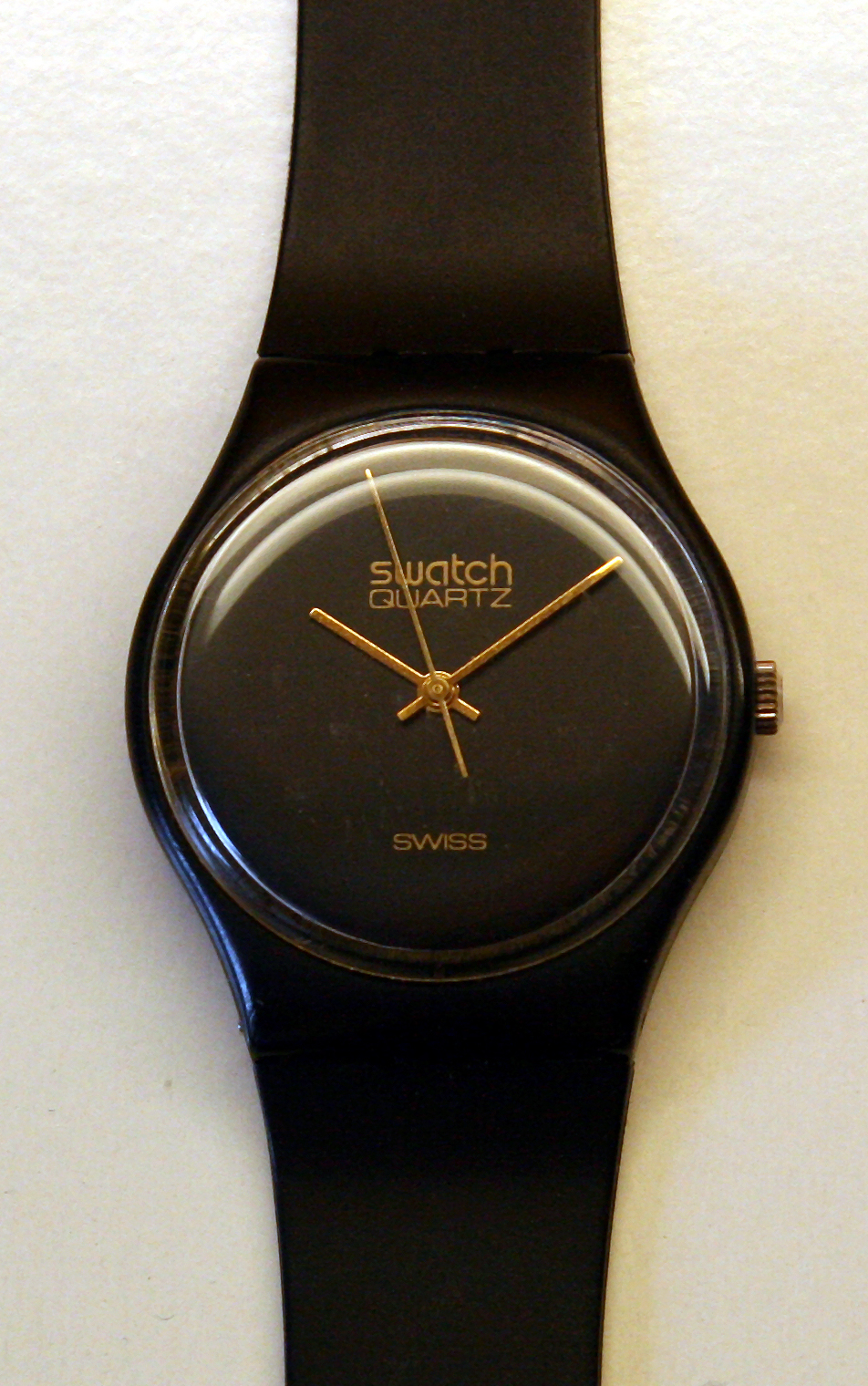
A Swatch watch labelled "SWISS"

According to current Swiss legislation, watch manufacturers and brands are allowed to use the label "Swiss made" only if their timepieces fulfill a set of clearly defined legal requirements. These standards are part of Switzerland’s ongoing efforts to protect the reputation and authenticity of its watchmaking industry, which is renowned worldwide for quality, craftsmanship, and precision.

However, it's important to understand that the definition of “Swiss made” has not always been the same. Over the years, the legal criteria have been revised and refined. In earlier decades, there were fewer regulations, and in some cases, the standards were not even codified in national law. This means that vintage watches or older models that bear the “Swiss made” mark may not necessarily conform to the stricter legal requirements that are in place today.

That being said, the presence of the “Swiss made” label on an older watch does not automatically mean it falls short of modern standards. In fact, many vintage Swiss watches were built with exceptional craftsmanship and might even exceed the current minimum legal benchmarks. The current law defines a baseline—essentially the minimum conditions a watch must meet to qualify as “Swiss made”—but many high-end brands choose to go well beyond these basic standards to uphold their legacy and reputation for excellence.

The Ordinance on the Use of «Switzerland» or «Swiss» for Watches first defines a "watch" (as opposed to a clock) by the dimensions of its movement in its Article 1, Definition of «watch». Thereafter, the law defines a Swiss watch, the definition of which is dependent on certain aspects of its movement. The law then goes on to define under what circumstances a watch movement may be considered Swiss made. The law then sets forth the conditions for the use of the name Swiss on watches, on watch cases, on watch movements, on watch dials and on replacement watch parts. In sum, a watch is considered Swiss when it has been developed in Switzerland, it uses a Swiss movement, is assembled and controlled in Switzerland by the Manufacture d'horlogerie and when 60% of its manufacturing costs are Swiss. The legal standards for the use of "Swiss made" on a watch are a very minimum standard, and the Swissness of a watch is largely dependent on the brand and its reputation.

A watch is considered Swiss, according to the Swiss law, if:

- its technical development is carried out in Switzerland; and
- its movement is Swiss; and
- its movement is cased up in Switzerland; and
- the manufacturer carries out the final inspection in Switzerland; and
- 60 per cent of the manufacturing costs are incurred in Switzerland.

If a watch movement is intended for export and will not be cased-up in Switzerland, but it otherwise meets the criteria to be considered a Swiss movement, the watch may say "Swiss Movement" but it may not say "Swiss made" nor "Swiss Movt" on the watch case or dial.

A watch that says "Swiss Quartz" is supposed to be manufactured in Switzerland according to the legal criteria above-stated. However, it is often improperly used by foreign manufacturers to merely indicate that the quartz movement is of Swiss origin.

Use of the Swiss made label for watches is covered by an ordinance of the Federal Council dated 29 December 1971. The Swiss standard is often pejoratively referred to as the 60% Rule. However, it has its basis in real life economics. Again, the law merely sets forth a minimum standard. The Swiss Made Ordinance has, for a number of years, been subject to many criticisms, particularly inside the industry, because it is considered too lax, but also in legal circles, where the view is that it no longer fully meets the legal mandate specified in the companion law on trademarks.

The first Ordinance on the Use of «Switzerland» or «Swiss» for Watches published in 1971 mainly defined the Swiss movement and did not give specific criteria for the watch as a whole. However, it had already a criterion of value-added for the movement.

A watch is considered to be Swiss if its movement:

1. Has been assembled in Switzerland and;
2. Has been started, adjusted and checked by the manufacturer in Switzerland, and;
3. Is of Swiss manufacture for at least 50 per cent of the value of all constituent parts, but without the cost of assembly and; d. Is subject to legal technical inspection in Switzerland according to the system in force.

The Swiss Federal Council modified the ordinance regulating the use of the "Swiss" name for watches in May 1995. This revision was explained in a press release entitled On foreign parts for watches. This was said to bring the requirements of Swiss watchmaking industry a rubric like those of the European Union. In essence, the revision made it possible to affix indications of "Swiss made" on foreign watchcases and dials intended to equip Swiss watches. A watch is considered Swiss whose movement is Swiss, whose movement is encased in Switzerland and whose final control by the manufacturer takes place in Switzerland. Conversely, the Swiss manufacturers of parts destined for foreign watches from then on were authorised to visibly indicate that their products come from Switzerland. These innovations were intended to improve the transparency as regards the source of products. Consumers were expected to clearly recognise from what countries the various constituent parts of the watches came. However, the revisions were not intended to reduce the protection the name "Swiss made". Indeed, the high requirements which are imposed with a Swiss watch were said to remain unchanged.

From time to time, namely in 2003 and more particularly in 2007, there were efforts made to strengthen the definition of "Swiss made". These efforts are normally spearheaded by the Federation of the Swiss Watch Industry (FH) a trade organisation. 30 companies have opposed such efforts under which the lobbying group IG Swiss made. Many are afraid to share their identity but Ronnie Bernheim, co-CEO of Mondaine, has been outspoken on this issue, and defends "Swissness more as a promise than a physical manifestation". Mondaine admits that it uses non-Swiss dials and cases though Bernheim has declined to disclose their country of origin.

In 2007, the FH plans to seek political action on a proposal which introduces a new aspect to the definition of Swiss made, in the form of a value criterion.

Accordingly, any mechanical watch in which at least 80% of the production cost is attributable to operations carried out in Switzerland would be considered as a mechanical Swiss watch. For other watches, particularly electronic watches, this rate would be 60%. Technical construction and prototype development would moreover need to be carried out in Switzerland. Raw materials, precious stones and the battery would be excluded from the production cost. The Swiss movement in the existing ordinance already has a value criterion, namely the rate of 50%. Considering that here, too, the definition needs reinforcing, the draft amends these value criteria. For mechanical movements therefore, the rate would be at least 80% of the value of all constituent parts. For other movements, particularly electronic movements, this rate would be 60%. Technical construction and prototype development in Switzerland would also be a requirement in this case. The draft also stipulates other provisions concerning the definition of Swiss constituent parts and assembly in Switzerland.

With a rate of 80%, the FH proposed to lay particular emphasis on the mechanical watch. With these proposals, objectives in terms of protecting the Swiss made label should be attained. The proposed criteria also take into account the place of manufacture and the origin of components, thereby complying with the law on trademarks which serves as the legal basis of the "Swiss made" Ordinance. However, it will be up to the Federal Council to reach a final decision on the matter.

The minimum rate of 60% was finally chosen for all type of watches in 2016 by the Federal Council as it corresponds to the rate used in the free-trade agreement between Switzerland and the European Union. A higher value criterion would not have allowed Switzerland to meet its international commitments and was, therefore, refused.

== Other products ==
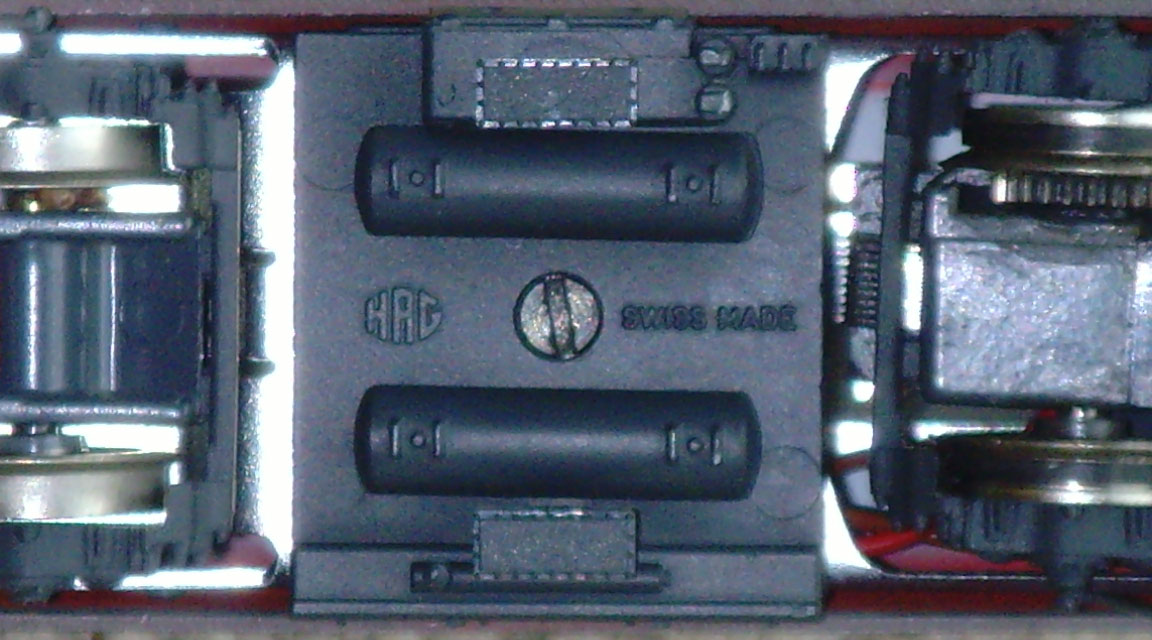
Underside of HAG model locomotive marked "Swiss made"

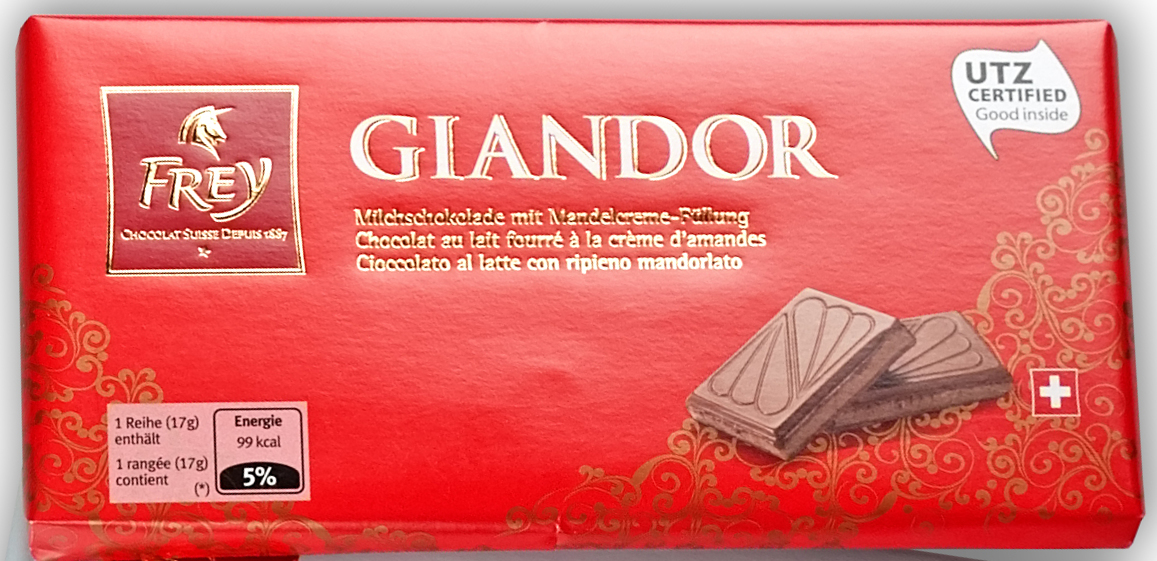
A chocolate bar with a Swiss flag certifying its Swiss production

The most popular items by far to have the "Swiss made" labels are Swiss watches. Almost all Swiss watchmakers, with the notable exception of old Breitling timepieces, label their watches prominently on the dial. By convention, the words are fully capitalised, positioned on the bottom of the face, split by the half-hour indicator if available, curved along the bottom edge as necessary. Watches made in other countries typically indicate their country of origin on the back of the watch, except for very few well-known high-end manufacturers. Besides watchmakers, Swiss software companies are marking their software with the "Swiss made" software label to declare the origin of their products.

In principle, the name "Switzerland", as well as designations such as "Swiss", "Swiss quality", "Made in Switzerland", "Swiss made" or others containing the Swiss name, can only be used for products manufactured in Switzerland. This also applies to the translation of any of these terms into any other language.

The conditions for using "Switzerland" or "Swiss" for products are defined very generally in the Trademark Law as follows: The origin of goods shall be determined by the place of manufacture or by the origin of the basic materials and components used. The Federal Council can specify such conditions if it is justified by general economic interests or by the interests of individual sectors.

Up until today, this has only been done – after a protracted debate concerning the highly controversial interests in the watch sector – with the "Swiss-made" ordinance for watches (the Watch Ordinance). Besides this regulation, only a sparse number of court opinion on the topic can be found; in particular, the decision of the Commercial Court of St. Gallen according to which the value of the Swiss portion of the manufacturing costs including raw materials, sub-assemblies, accessory parts, salaries, and general manufacturing costs but excluding operating expenses, must be at least 50% and the "essential manufacturing process" which must have taken place in Switzerland. Exactly how "essential manufacturing process" should be understood has been illustrated by the following two examples: For a woven scarf to be considered a product of Swiss origin because of a particular coating it has received in Switzerland which stiffened the fabric (although this clearly is an important characteristic of the quality) is insufficient. In the eyes of the customer, the quality of the woven fabric is such an important characteristic of the product that fabric can only be indicated as being of Swiss origin if it was actually woven in Switzerland. In fountain pens, the nib is an important element. But the quality of the fountain pen also primarily depends on the quality of the other parts. According to experience, more repairs are made on the holder than on the nibs for the fountain pens. For this reason, consumers pay attention not only to the quality of the nib but also to the quality of the holder (the feed system, the ink regulating system). That is why these parts of a fountain pen are not considered subsidiary parts. Thus, a fountain pen may not be marked as a Swiss product if only the nib has been manufactured in Switzerland.

== Legislation ==
The current legislation contains only very generally formulated conditions which must be met for using a ‘made in Switzerland’ designation. With the exception of watches, no concrete criteria exist regarding when and by whom a 'made in Switzerland' designation can be affixed to a product and when it cannot. Appropriate criteria have only been developed by individual cantonal courts up until now.

Products are, however, sold which are not 100% Swiss-manufactured. In such cases, the actual legal practice is based on the rules laid down in Article 48 of the Trademark Law and a 1968 ruling issued by the trade court of St. Gallen, reiterated in 1992. These court rulings outline the conditions for the legal use of the designation "Swiss Made" and similar designations, especially for goods not manufactured in Switzerland in their entirety. In pertinent part the case law holds:

Products are considered Swiss products if they are fundamentally local products or if they have been completely manufactured in Switzerland. In the case of products that have been only partly manufactured in Switzerland, the rule applies that the Swiss portion of the production cost (including basic materials, semi-finished products, accessories, wages and production overhead excluding distribution costs) must be at least 50%. However, this 50% portion is not the sole criterion for determining the Swiss origin of a product. The origin of the essential components and the manufacturing process through which a product obtains its characteristic features, and – in borderline or doubtful cases – the origin of the intellectual property embodied in the product and the special circumstances in the respective industry must also be taken into due consideration.

Accordingly, there are two conditions that must be fulfilled for goods to be legally labelled as being of Swiss origin:

- The Swiss portion of the production cost must be at least 50 per cent (until 1 January 2017, then 60 per cent).
- The most important part of the manufacturing process must have taken place in Switzerland.

The "most important part of the manufacturing process" is that part of the process that results in a completely new product. The determining factor here is that the original characteristics of the goods are lost through the manufacturing process, and the possible application of the goods is different from that of the basic materials of foreign origin used in their manufacture. In addition, the origin of goods is determined by the place where they are produced, not by where the idea for producing these goods was conceived. A product manufactured in Switzerland under a foreign licence will still be Swiss in origin, while a product manufactured abroad using Swiss recipes or Swiss methods will still be foreign in origin.

Practically, the Federal Council Ordinance of 23 December 1971 to regulate the use of the SWISS appellation for watches was partially revised on 17 June 2016 at the request of the industry, in order to strengthen the protection of the geographical indication. According to the Federation of the Swiss Watch Industry, the intention is to “guarantee satisfaction of the consumer who, when buying a Swiss made watch, expects it to correspond to the quality and the reputation of Swiss watchmaking tradition and therefore to be manufactured in Switzerland and to incorporate a high added value of Swiss origin.”

According to that ordinance, the geographical indication Switzerland or Swiss can be used on a watch if:

- its technical development is carried out in Switzerland;
- its movement (the motor of the watch) is Swiss;
- its movement is cased up in Switzerland;
- the manufacturer carries out the final inspection in Switzerland; and
- at least 60 per cent of the manufacturing cost are generated in Switzerland.

A movement is considered to be Swiss if:

- it has been assembled in Switzerland;
- the technical development is carried out in Switzerland;
- it has been inspected by the manufacturer in Switzerland;
- at least 60 per cent of the manufacturing cost are generated in Switzerland; and
- the components of Swiss manufacture account for at least 50 per cent of the total value, without taking into account the cost of assembly.

In 2026 shoemaker On was accused to dilute the "Swiss made" trademark, visualized by the Swiss Cross on its products. With the companies research and development located in Switzerland but production happening in Asia, the Swiss Federal Institute of Intellectual Property concluded in March 2026 that "On" can continue to use the Swiss Cross, as long as it is positioned between the words "Swiss" and "Engineering". This decision has sparked controversies in Swiss media, with some calling it a threat to the Swiss industry.

== See also ==
- Home country control
- Country of origin
- Made in USA
- Made in Germany
- Geneva Seal
- Appellation d'origine contrôlée
- Made in France
- Made in Italy
- Luxury goods
