= 3.5 mm =

3.5 mm or 3.5mm may refer to:

- HO scale, in rail transport modelling, 1:87 scale, with rails 16.5 mm apart, representing standard gauge
- 3.5 mm jack, used on audio and mobile telephony equipment
