= Rado (watchmaker) =

Swiss watch manufacturer

Rado Watch Co. Ltd.
- Formerly: Schlup & Co.
- Type: Subsidiary
- Industry: Watchmaking
- Founded: 1917; 109 years ago
- Founders: Fritz Schlup, Ernst Schlup and Werner Schlup
- Headquarters: Lengnau, Canton of Bern, Switzerland
- Key people: Adrian Bosshard (CEO)
- Products: Watches
- Parent: Swatch Group
- Website: www.rado.com

Rado is a Swiss watch manufacturer headquartered in Lengnau, in the Canton of Bern. It was founded in 1917 as Schlup & Co. by the brothers Fritz, Ernst and Werner Schlup and initially produced watch movements. Rado became part of ASUAG in 1968; following ASUAG's merger with SSIH, it became part of the group that was renamed the Swatch Group in 1998.

Rado is particularly associated with the use of hardmetal, sapphire crystal and advanced ceramic materials in watches. The DiaStar, introduced in 1962, used a hardmetal case and sapphire crystal and was marketed as a highly scratch-resistant watch.

== History ==
=== Schlup & Co. ===
Schlup & Co. was founded in Lengnau in 1917 by the brothers Fritz, Ernst and Werner Schlup as a manufacturer of watch movements. Their first workshop was established in their parents' home, where they produced hand-wound movements with lever escapements.

The name Rado was registered as a trademark in 1928. The name is generally considered to derive from Esperanto, in which rado means "wheel", although the origin of the choice is not documented conclusively.

According to the Historical Dictionary of Switzerland, Schlup & Co. began producing its own watches under the Rado brand in 1954 and adopted Rado as the company name in 1957. The Green Horse, launched in 1957, was the first watch collection introduced under the Rado brand. The Golden Horse, another early Rado model, was also introduced in 1957.

=== DiaStar and expansion ===
In November 1961, Rado filed a patent relating to the use of a tungsten carbide-based hardmetal for watch cases. The following year, it introduced the DiaStar 1, which combined a hardmetal case with a sapphire crystal and was marketed by Rado as the world's first "scratchproof" watch.

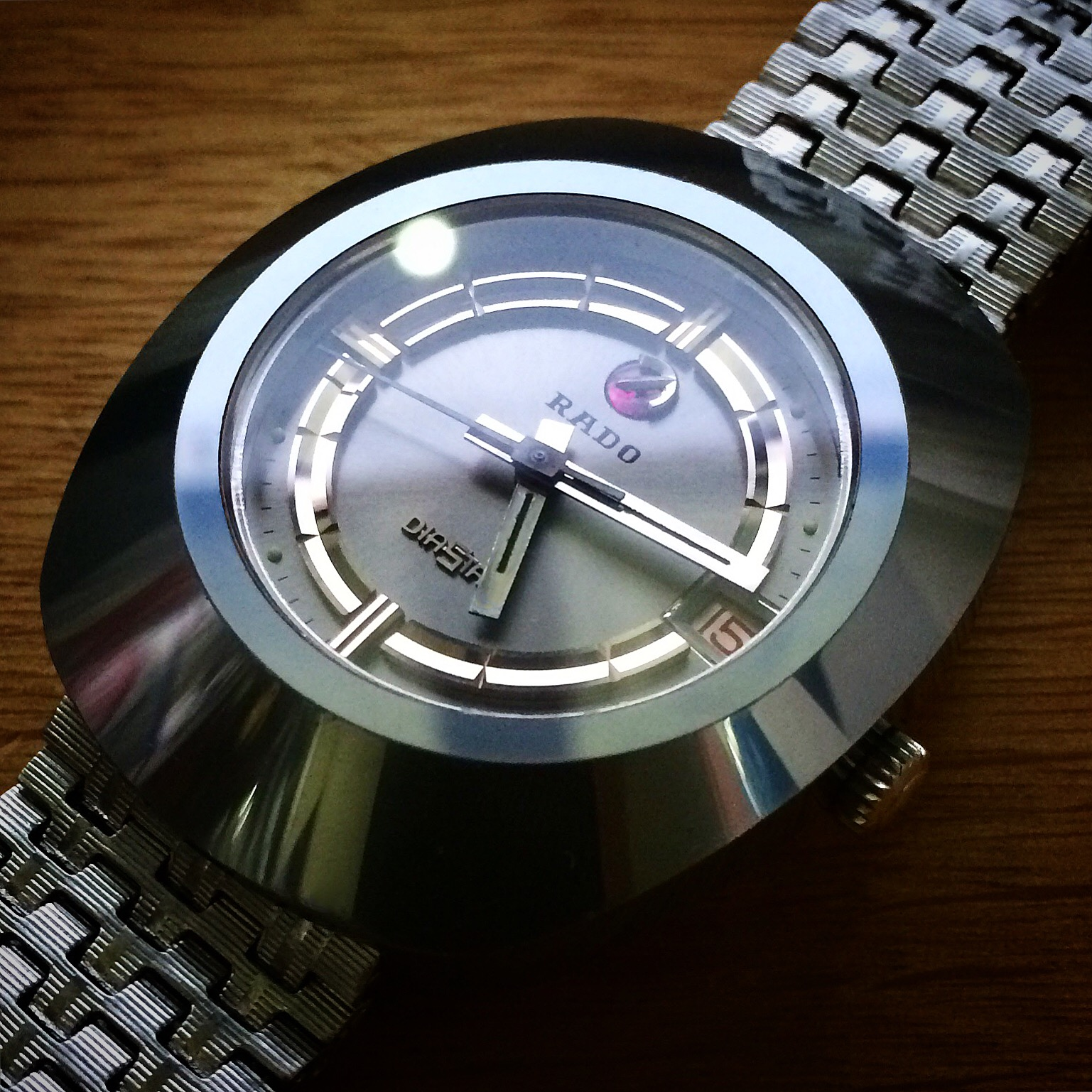
Rado DiaStar 1, introduced in 1962

Rado also introduced the Captain Cook diving watch in 1962. The original model was produced in relatively small numbers during the 1960s and was later revived as part of the company's collection.

Rado joined ASUAG in 1968. A new company headquarters was opened in Lengnau in 1975.

In 1983, ASUAG merged with SSIH. The combined group was renamed SMH in 1985 and became the Swatch Group in 1998.

== Materials and design ==
The use of hard and scratch-resistant materials became a recurring feature of Rado watches. The 1962 DiaStar used a tungsten-carbide-based hardmetal case together with a sapphire crystal.

In 1986, Rado introduced the Integral, which incorporated ceramic components into its bracelet. Ceramic materials were beginning to be used more widely in watchmaking during the 1980s, with manufacturers including Rado, IWC and Seiko developing different applications of the material.

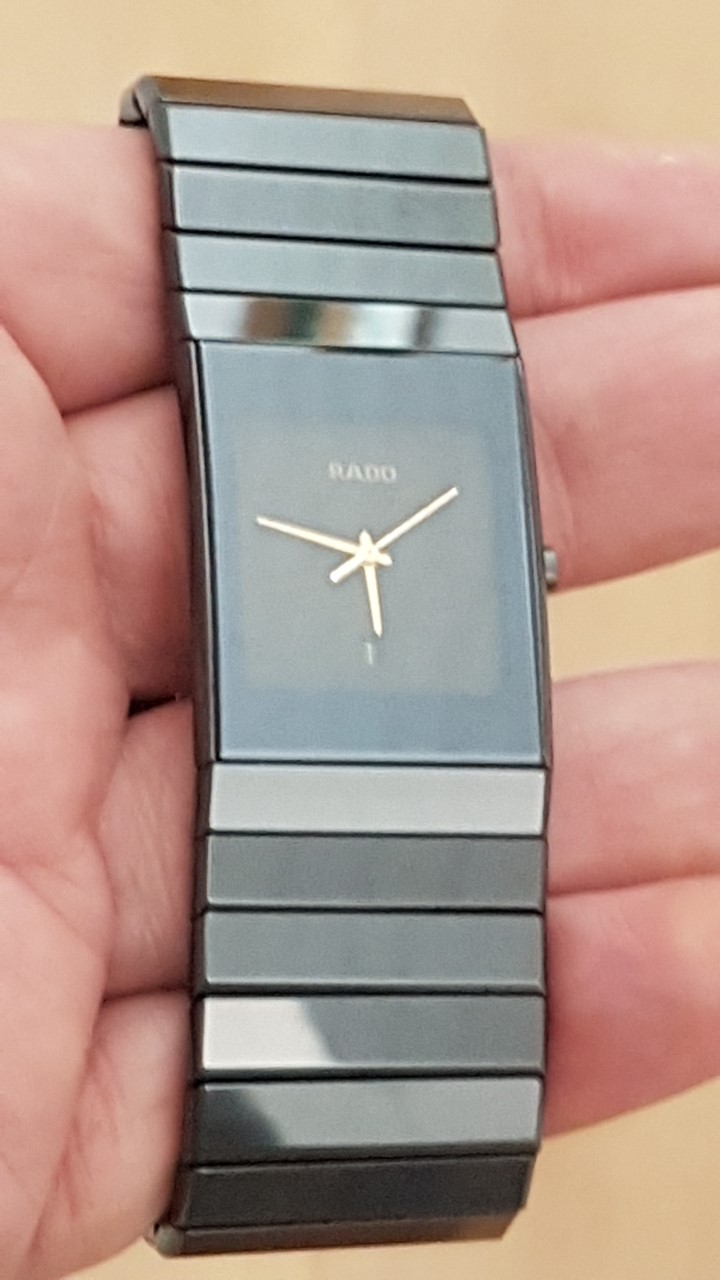
Rado Ceramica

The Ceramica, introduced in 1990, extended the use of ceramic to an integrated case and bracelet design.

The Sintra, introduced in 1993, used a ceramic-metal composite. Rado later developed related composite materials under the name Ceramos.

The company has also used plasma-treated ceramic, in which finished ceramic components undergo a high-temperature treatment that gives the surface a metallic appearance without the use of a conventional metallic coating.

In 2002, Rado introduced the V10K, which used a synthetic diamond coating with a stated hardness of 10,000 on the Vickers scale.

Rado has collaborated with designers including Jasper Morrison and Konstantin Grcic. Morrison designed the r5.5, introduced in 2009, while Grcic redesigned the Ceramica collection in 2016.

== Operations ==
In 2000, Rado had annual sales of approximately €230 million. At the time, the company had a strong presence in German-speaking markets and in countries including China and Saudi Arabia, while seeking to expand its presence in France.

In 2006, Rado employed about 300 people and produced nearly 400,000 watches. In 2024, a watch-industry reference work listed the company as having approximately 500 employees.

== Gallery ==
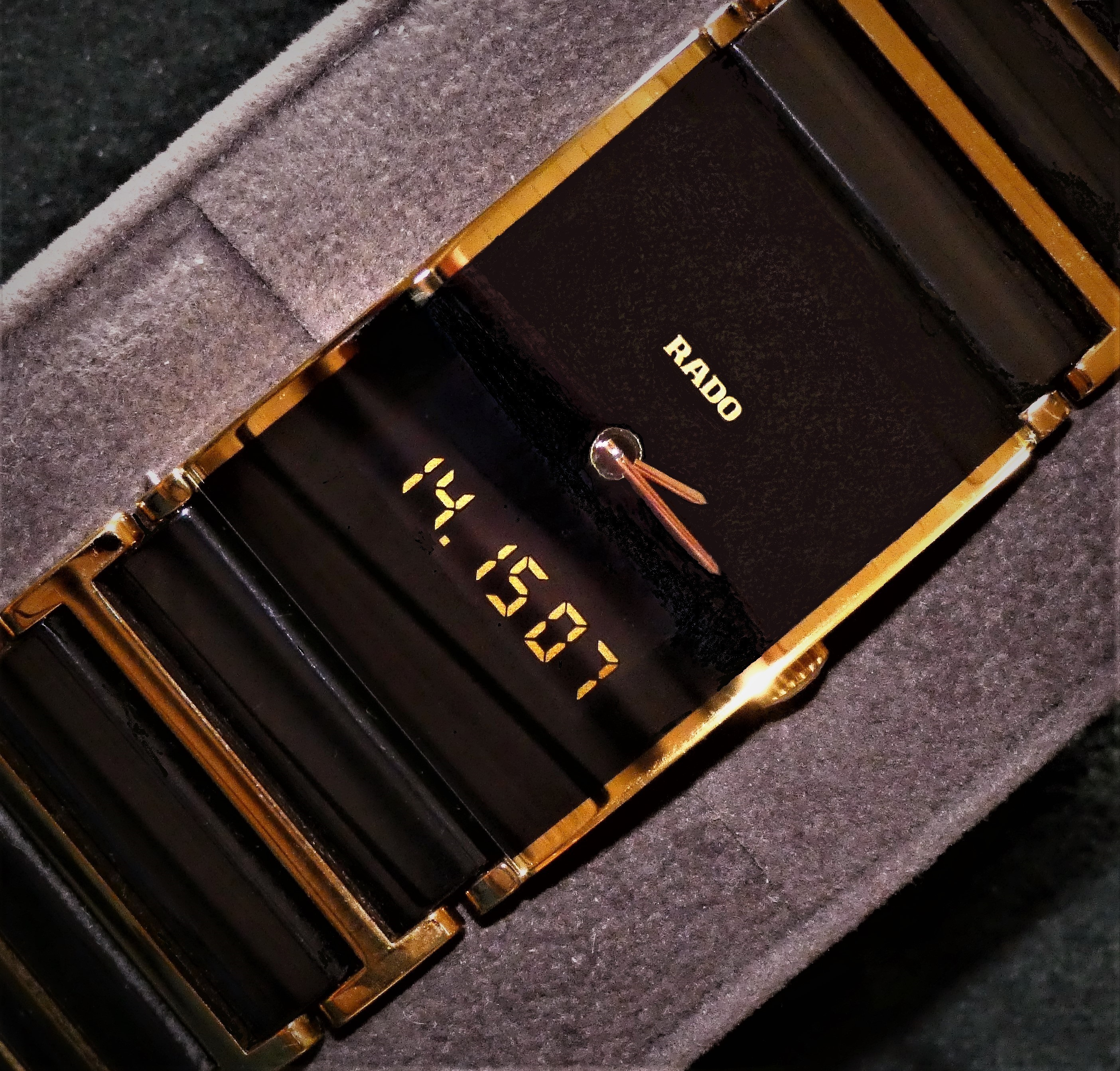
A later DiaStar model

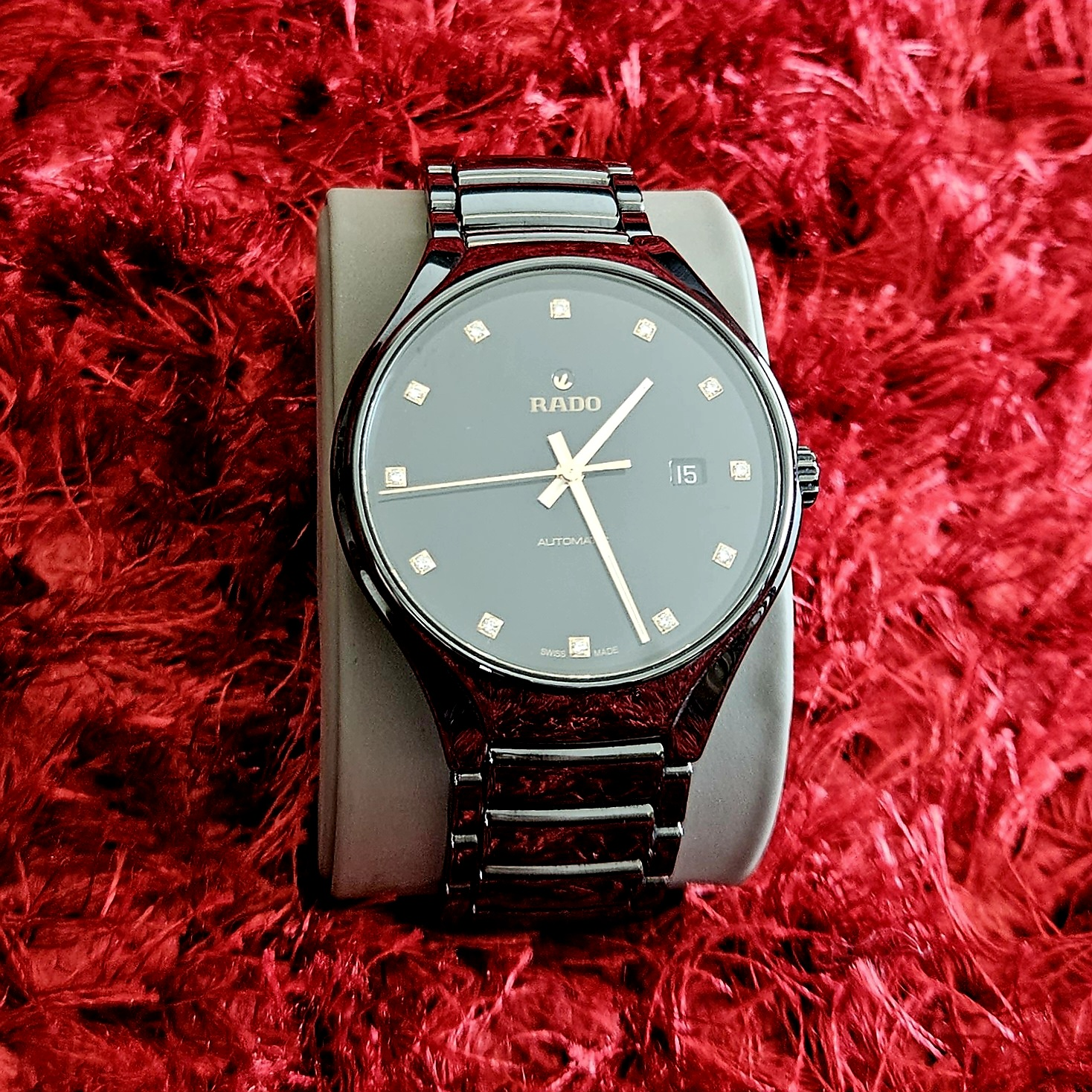
Rado True Automatic

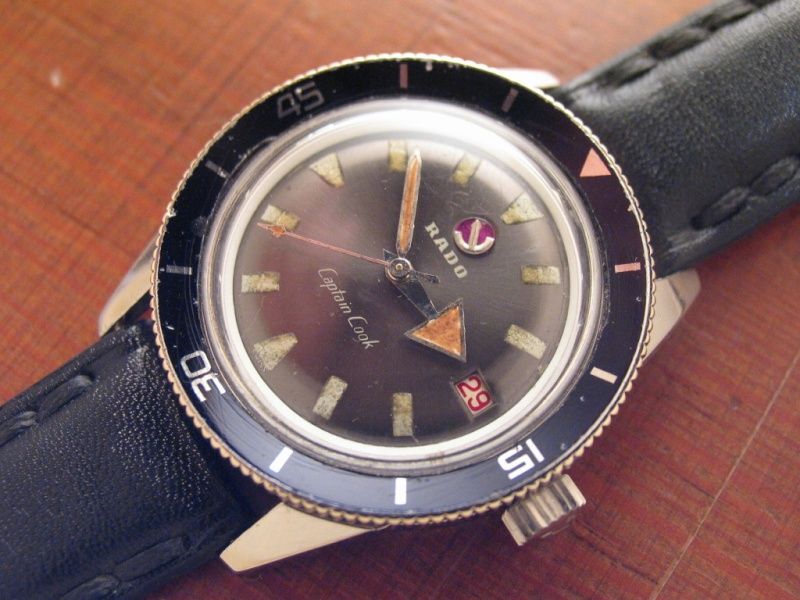
Rado Captain Cook MK1

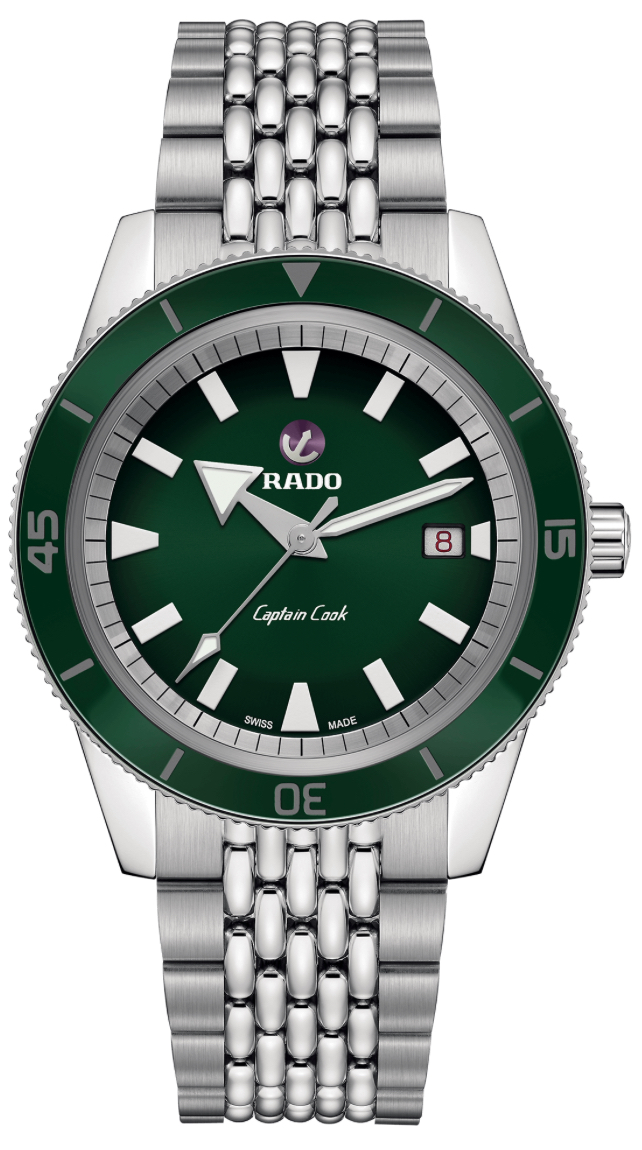
A later Captain Cook model

== See also ==
- List of watch manufacturers
- Swiss made
- Swatch Group
