= Ibertren =

Old logo

Ibertren logo since 2004

Ibertren is a Spanish brand of model railway, based in Barcelona. It specialises in models of the Spanish Renfe train engines and cars.

Ibertren N scale models were quite popular in Spain in the 90s; as of 2008, it sells a very limited selection of N models and a few H0 models.

== N series ==
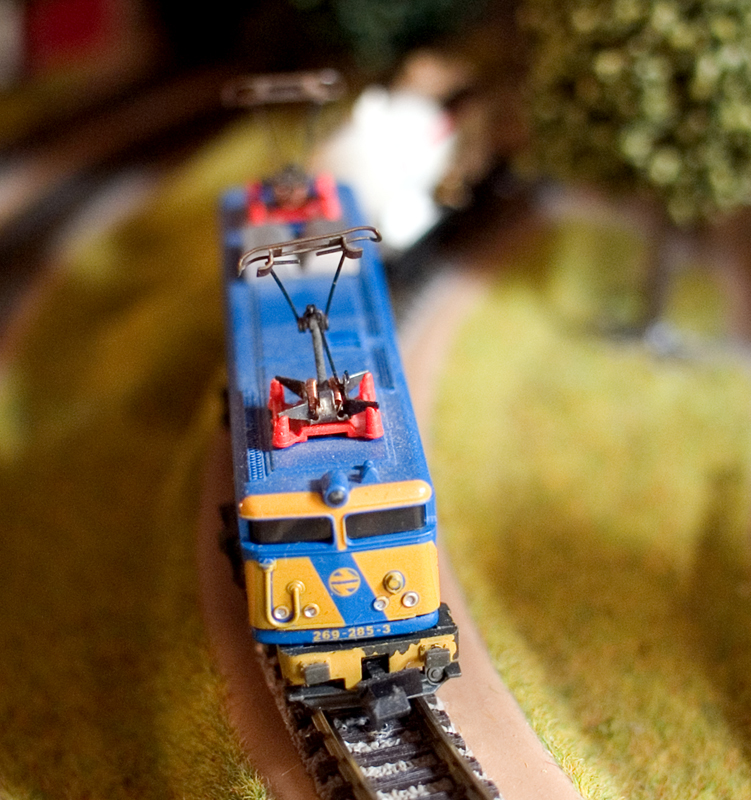
Ibertren Renfe class 269 NScale

Ibertren manufactured two series of N-scale models: 2N and 3N.

In the 3N series, a non-insulated DC three-rail system was used to power the engines. The 2N series, which were introduced later when 3N sales went down, used DC with negative current on one rail and positive on the other.

== Scenery ==
Ibertren also sold model train scenery, such as cars, people, and train stations.

== History ==
In 1973, Iberten launched its first model train engines, modeled after a green diesel SNCF 61006 shunter.

In 1992, Model Iber S.A., the company from Barcelona behind the Ibertren brand, was forced to shut down due to financial problems.

In 2004, a company named "Ibertren Modelismo, S.L." (also from Barcelona) relaunched the brand, with a H0-only catalog.

In 2008, the company announced at the Nuremberg Toy Fair that it would manufacture N models again.
