= Brass model =

Scale models

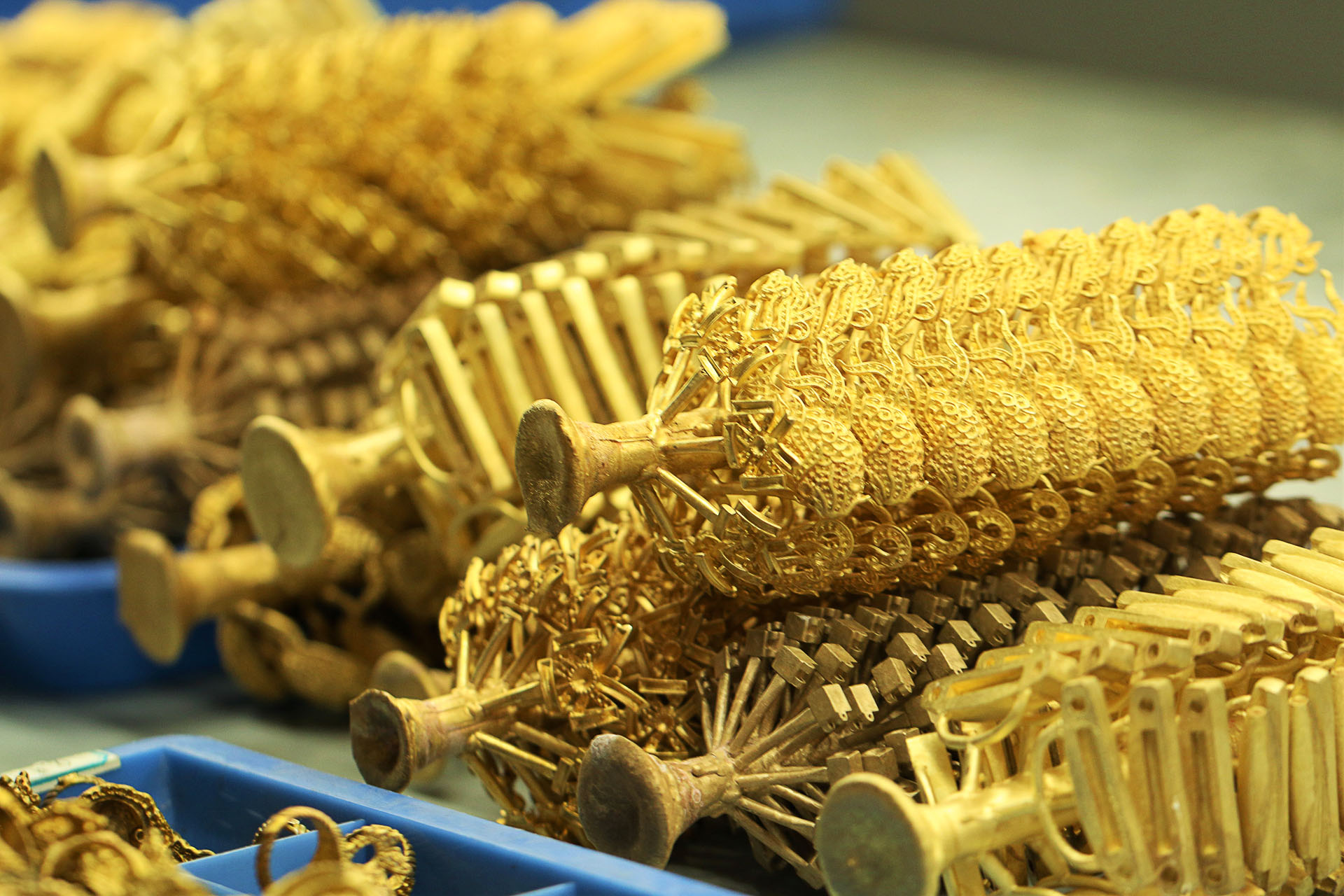
Cast brass model components on a sprue

Brass models are scale models typically of railroad equipment, bridges and occasionally of buildings, made from brass or similar alloys. Although die-cast or plastic models have made considerable advances in late 1990s and continue to improve, brass models offer finer details. Brass models, considered to be collector's pieces and museum quality finish, are often used for display purposes rather than model railroad operations. However, these can be made fully operational and many railroaders do use them on their model railroads. They are generally considerably more expensive than other types of models due to limited production quantities and the "handmade" nature of the product itself.

== History ==
In the late 1950s, Japan was known for producing low cost toys and products for export. The first brass model trains were created during the occupation of Japan by Allied forces. Members of allied forces saw some of the models built by various craftsman and procured photos of American steam locomotive prototypes for these artisans to model. These were the early hand-built high quality brass models, built with relatively crude equipment in comparison to tools that became available later. Some people in the model railroad industry took note of what was being done and started importing these models to the United States. The scale of import increased with time. Bill Ryan of PFM (Pacific Fast Mail) was one of the early importers, and to this day the name PFM is synonymous with brass model trains.

The quality of Japanese models continued to improve but with an improving domestic economy, manufacturing cost also increased. Eventually, importers moved their operations to Korea for cost benefits. Although the quality suffered considerably in the early years of this transition, within a few years some very fine brass models were being built.

Thousands of brass model trains have been produced throughout the years. Initially their price was comparable to that of die-cast models, but the detail was far superior. The quality and details of brass models have increased with time along with its price. As of 2014, an articulated HO scale, highly detailed model may retail for as much as US $3000; larger scales can cost even more. The collectibility of late run highly detailed models, along with lower availability, generally keeps the prices high. Historically, the most desirable models have continued to rise in value. Mid-run (1960-1985) models, in particular unpainted models, have appeared to drop in value lately, as they are becoming less desirable in comparison with newer models with much better details. These models still often sell for several times the original suggested retail price.

== Glossary ==
Glossary of brass model train terminology:

Handbuilt
Generally refers to the early models made for the GIs that were built entirely by hand. In many ways brass models are still handbuilt to this day.
Crown
At first these were very limited runs of the highest quality models imported by PFM. Later the term was used a bit more loosely, though generally only for very high quality models. Other importers used phrases such as 'Ruby' (Gem Models), 'Royale Series' (Custom Brass), or something similar.
Factory Painted
A model painted by the builder. Some models were painted in the USA after being imported. Though these paint jobs were commissioned by the importer and are normally high quality, they would be considered custom painted.
Custom Paint
This has a broad meaning, as the quality can vary widely; however, it means any model that is painted, but not by the builder.
Pro Paint
This term should only be used by professional painters. The quality of a true professional should be very close to that of a factory painted model.
Plated
A term for nickel plating; often brass drivers (wheels) are nickel-plated, silver color. At times entire models are nickel-plated (they look like silver).
Wheel Wear
This refers to brass showing through on the drivers (wheels). This happens when the engine has been run enough on a track to wear through the nickel plating, and often is a sign of somewhat heavy use of the model.
Drawbar
The bar that connects a steam locomotive to the tender. Often needed for a good electrical connection.
Open Frame Motor
Used on earlier models, generally up until the early 1970s. You can see the armature, brushes on the sides of the motor.
Can Motor
A motor that is fully enclosed in a can-shaped shell. None of the internal components are visible.

== Manufacturers ==
Manufacturers of brass models include:

- Bavaria
- Boo-Rim Precision
- Ajin Precision
- Fulgurex
- Lemaco
- Musashino Model

Active Importers, both in the USA and Europe include:

- Precision Scale Models, Inc
- Glacier Park Models
- The Coach Yard
- Union Terminal Imports
- North Bank Line
- Micro Metakit
- Overland Models Inc.
- Key Model Imports
- Sunset Models, 3rd Rail

Importers that are no longer active include:

- Railway Classics
- Shoreham Shops
- W&R Enterprises
- Weinert
- Classic Construction Models
- Max Gray
- Pacific Fast Mail
- WestSide Model Company
- Ferro Swiss
- KTM
- NJ International, Custom Brass
- E.Suydam & Company
- Tenshodo
- Von Stetina Artworks
- EFC-Loko
- TOLOLOKO

== See also ==
- Rail transport modelling
- Scale models
- HO scale
