= Gauge 3 Railways =

Model railway gauge

Gauge 3
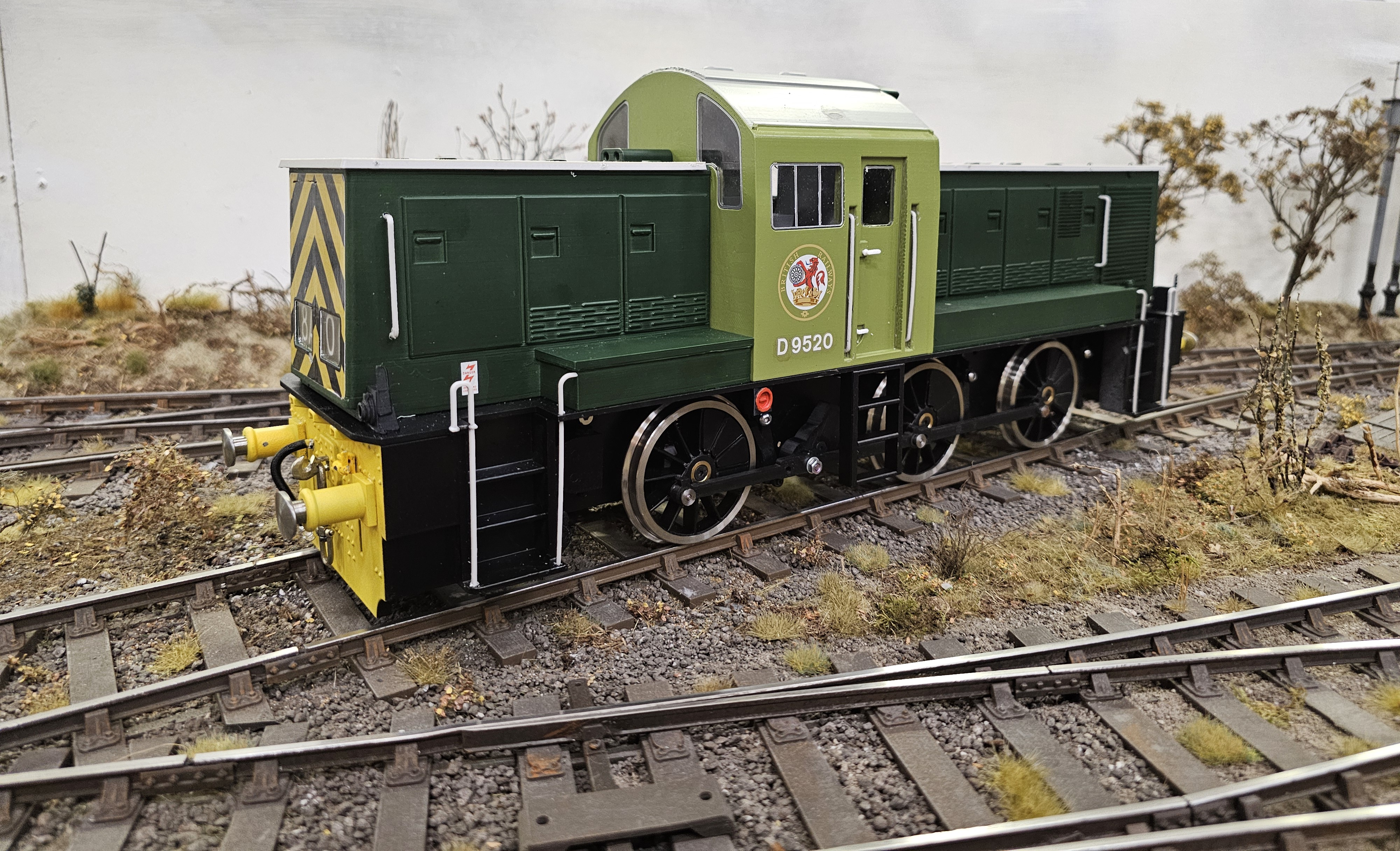
- Gauge 3 model of a British Rail Class 14 locomotive by ALD Models
- Scale: 1/2 in (12.7 mm) to 1 ft (305 mm)
- Scale ratio: 1:22.5 (Europe), 1:24 (UK)
- Model gauge: 2 1/2 in (64 mm)
- Prototype gauge: 4 ft 8 1/2 in (1,435 mm) standard gauge

Gauge 3, also known as 3 gauge or 2.5 inch gauge, is a model railway standard that uses track measuring 2 1/2 in (64 mm). Originally defined by the Model Railway and Locomotive Club in 1909, Gauge 3 represents standard gauge (1,435 mm / 4 ft 8½ in) railways at a scale of 1:22.5 (European) or 1:24 (British), making it one of the largest standard-gauge model railway scales in common use.

== History ==
Gauge 3 was one of the early model railway standards established in the early 20th century. While it initially gained some traction among model builders, it eventually declined in popularity due to the rise of smaller gauges like O gauge and HO scale, which required less space. Interest in Gauge 3 revived later, especially among live steam and garden railway enthusiasts in the UK and Germany.

== Scale and gauge ==
Gauge 3 uses a track width of 2 1/2 in (64 mm), which correctly represents standard gauge railways at:

- 1:22.5 scale (common in mainland Europe)
- 1:24 scale (or ½ inch to the foot, common in the UK)

This differs from Gauge 1, which also models standard gauge but at a smaller 1:32 scale using 45 mm track.

== Live steam and operation ==
Gauge 3 is well suited to live steam operation due to the size of the models. Many locomotives are powered by gas, spirit, or coal. The scale is large enough to allow realistic mechanical detail, and some models can haul ride-on passenger coaches on suitable track systems.

Electric and battery-powered models are also used, often with radio control.

== Popularity ==
Gauge 3 has a small but dedicated following, particularly in the UK. The Gauge 3 Society supports the scale with events, newsletters, technical standards, and supplier networks.

Layouts are typically built outdoors, taking advantage of the size and durability of the models. Some enthusiasts focus on highly detailed prototypical models, while others emphasize practical operation and engineering.

== Manufacturers and suppliers ==
Because of its niche appeal, most Gauge 3 models are hand-built or constructed from kits. Notable suppliers and builders include King Scale Live Steam and ALD Models.

Rolling stock and accessories are often scratch-built, with the Society providing standard profiles and dimensions.

== Comparison with other gauges ==
| Gauge | Track Gauge | Scale (UK) | Represents |
|---|---|---|---|
| HO | 16.5 mm | 1:87 | Standard gauge |
| O | 32 mm | 1:43.5 | Standard gauge |
| 1 | 45 mm | 1:32 | Standard gauge |
| 2 | 50.8 mm | 1:28.5 | Standard gauge |
| Gauge 3 | 64 mm | 1:22.5 / 1:24 | Standard gauge |
| 5" Gauge | 127mm | 1:11.3 / 1:6 | Standard or Narrow gauge |

== See also ==
- Rail transport modelling scales
- 1 gauge
- 2 gauge
- Garden railway
- Live steam
