= Doll & Co. =

Former Germany toy company

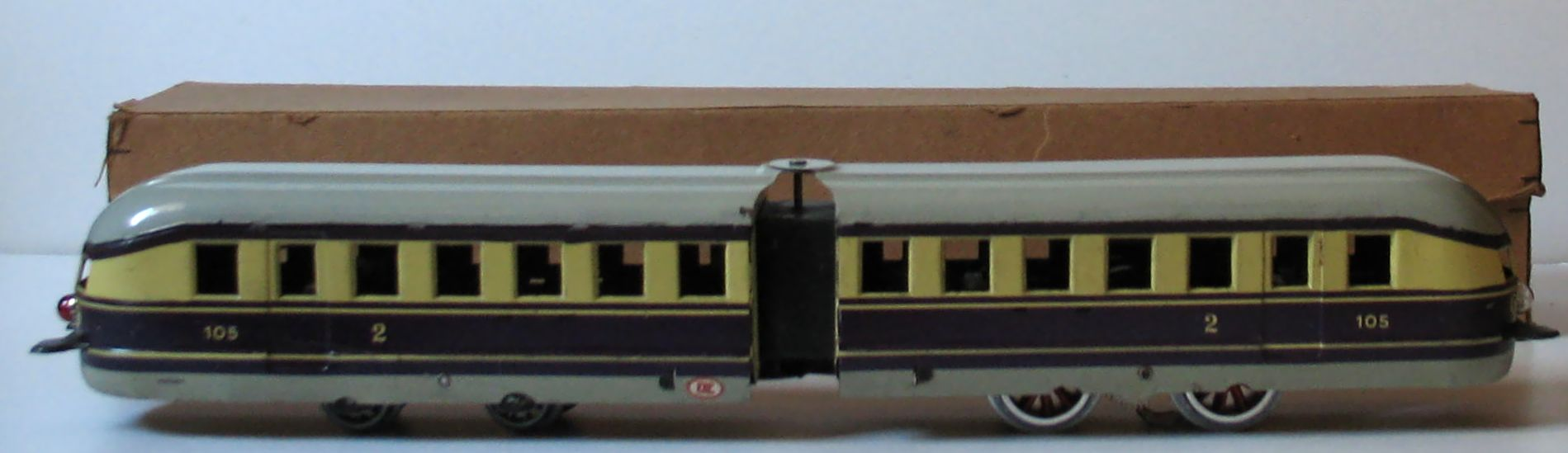
- Railcar, known as the ‘Flying Hamburger', by Doll & Co.
- Type: Privately held company
- Industry: Manufacturing
- Founded: 1898
- Founders: John Sondheim; Peter Doll
- Defunct: 1938
- Fate: Aryanized
- Successor: Fleischmann
- Headquarters: Nuremberg, Germany
- Products: Model railway toys; Steam engines
- Number of employees: 250 (1938)

Doll & Co. was a privately-held toy manufacturer founded in Nuremberg, Germany, in 1898. The company's product range mainly comprised steam engines and model railway toys. In 1938, the company was Aryanized and taken over by its competitor, Fleischmann. Doll produced almost exclusively high-quality O gauge model railroads.

== History ==
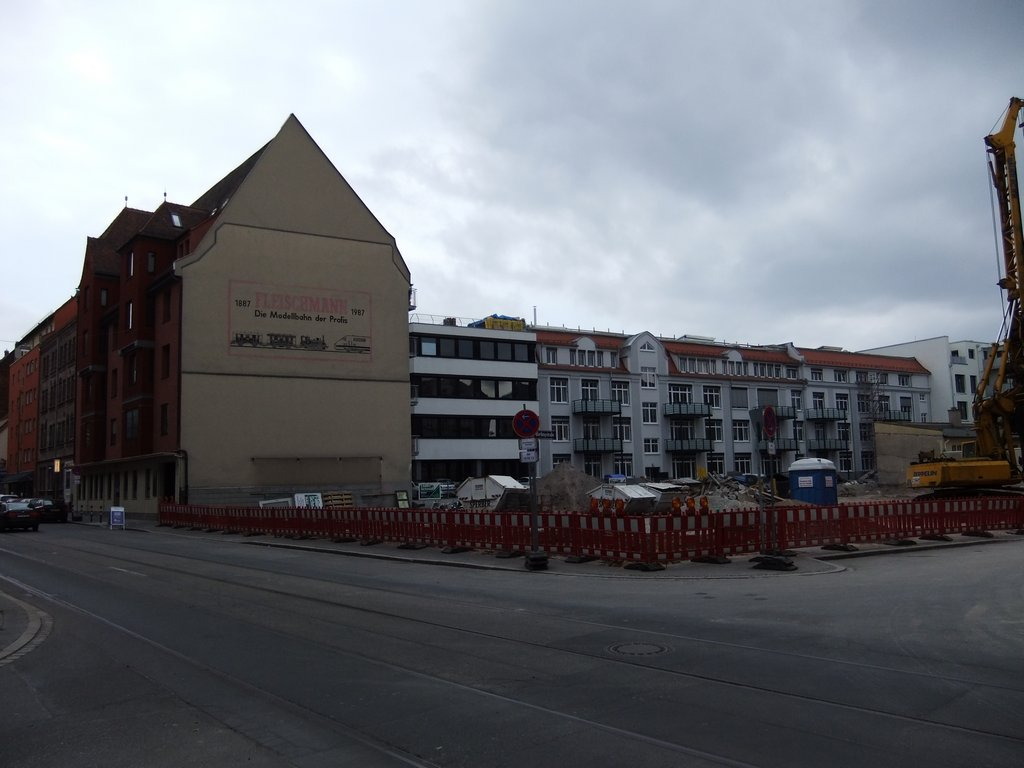
View of the factory site at Nürnberger Kirchenweg 13 in March 2012

In 1898, John Sondheim and the tinsmith Peter Doll founded a toy manufacturing company in Nuremberg. In the early phase, the company concentrated on the production of immobile steam engines. Foreign sales markets were found in the United Kingdom and Ireland as well as outside Europe in the United States. Production was initially located in rented premises on Bergstraße in the Burgviertel district, but the company later built its own factory building with a residential building at Kirchenweg 13, which still exists today.

Shortly before the outbreak of the First World War, one of Sondheim's nephews, Max Bein, joined the company. From this point onwards, Doll received a creative boost and developed various market innovations, in particular clock movements. After the war, in the 1920s, the steam engine production line was revived. In addition, model trains were built, a steam-powered toy car and a similarly powered truck.

In 1938, the company became the focus of the Nuremberg Race Laws, as the company founders were of Jewish origin and the Nazi regime demanded the Aryanization of the company. Doll had 250 employees at this time. Max Bein had to sell the company for a fraction of its value. The family managed to escape the Holocaust. The daughters were sent to England on a Kindertransport in 1939, while the parents managed to flee via The Netherlands to the United States when World War II broke out, where the family reunited near Boston in October 1940.

The Fleischmann company took over Doll and was thus able to add O gauge model railroads and steam engines to its existing product range. The “Doll” brand remained until 1949 and thus beyond World War II. The Doll company founders turned down a later offer from Fleischmann to return their shares and had them paid out instead.

The logo was “DC” in red on a green or white oval surface.
