= Woodland Scenics =

- Founded: 1975; 50 years ago Kansas, U.S.
- Founder: David Osment
- Area served: United States
- Products: Model railroad scenery
- Website: woodlandscenics.woodlandscenics.com

Woodland Scenics, along with its PineCar and Scene-A-Rama divisions, manufactures model scenery, gravity-driven pinewood racecars and educational arts and crafts.

The company was founded in 1975 by David Osment, the owner/operator of the architectural firm, Osment Models, Inc., based in Shawnee Mission, Kansas. Osment Models built commissioned architectural and engineering models for national and international corporations. Some of his work included office buildings, airports, sports stadiums, resorts, and a portion of Oral Roberts University in Tulsa, Oklahoma. Woodland Scenics sells wholesale to distributors who sell to retail hobby outlets or stores with hobby departments. Their product distribution network covers Africa, Asia, Australia, Europe and North and South America. Woodland Scenics is considered the prime innovator-inventor of realistic model railroad scenery and the industry leader responsible for setting the current industry standards.

== History ==
Original Woodland Scenics Catalog published in 1975 containing the 28 products offered for sale

The 1975 recession hit the architectural modeling industry hard, and Osment researched various ways he could diversify his business by capitalizing on his modeling skills. On a tip from an acquaintance, Osment researched the model railroad industry. He found the industry lacking in commercially available, realistic scenery material similar to the products they manufactured to landscape their architectural models. Osment assembled a sample of his manufactured architectural landscape scenery and displayed it as a vendor at a model railroad trade show in Chicago. Osment obtained several patents and began mass-producing scenery, doing business as Woodland Scenics. The company’s first catalog featured 28 products consisting of tree kits, foliage and turf material and stumps. Between 1976 and 1982 Woodland Scenics manufacturing output increased substantially. By 1981, Woodland Scenics had more than 100 distributors nationally and was exporting to Canada, Germany and Sweden. As the business expanded, so did the need for more physical plant manufacturing space. In 1981, Woodland Scenics relocated to Lake of the Ozarks, Missouri, specifically, the town of Linn Creek.
