= Fleischmann (model railroads) =

German model railway manufacturer

Gebr. Fleischmann GmbH
- Company type: Privately held company
- Founded: 1887
- Founder: Jean Fleischmann
- Headquarters: Heilsbronn, Ansbach (district), Germany
- Key people: Jean Fleischmann (founder); Gerhard Joiser (CEO)
- Products: Toys, model railroads
- Parent: Modelleisenbahn München GmbH
- Website: www.fleischmann.de

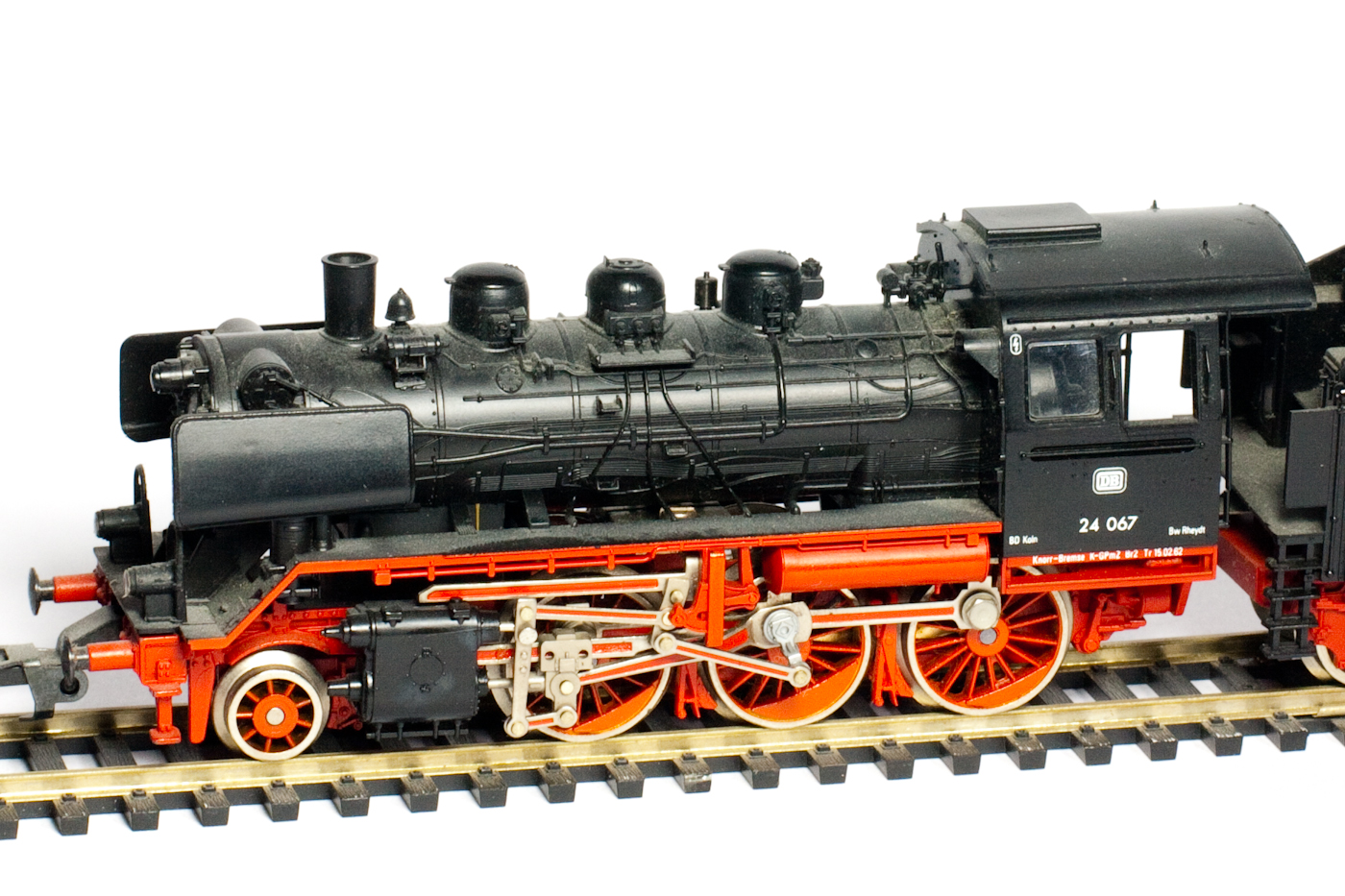
Fleischmann model locomotive

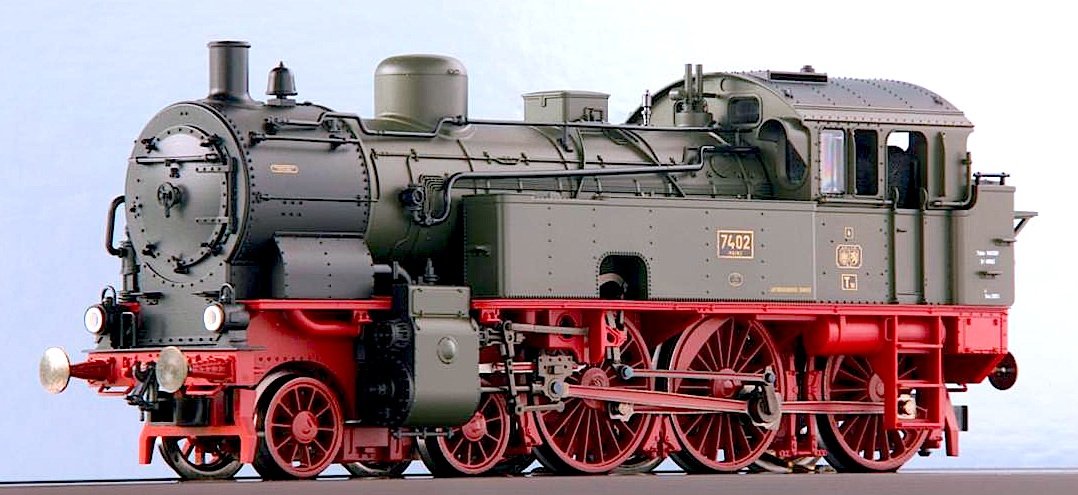
Prussian Class T 10 locomotive

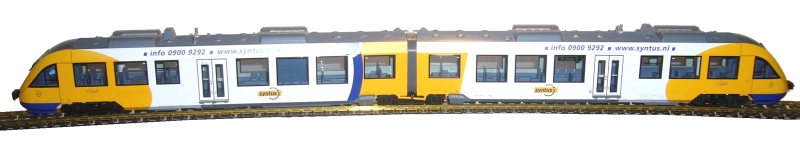
LINT train

Fleischmann is a German manufacturer of model railway products. Fleischmann was founded in Nuremberg in 1887 by Jean Fleischmann, as a toy company. Their first model train, in O scale, was produced in 1938. Their first H0 scale products were introduced in 1952 and their N scale "Piccolo" product line in 1969.

Nowadays, Fleischmann is a well-established brand name in the German model railway industry, rivalling Märklin in market share. Since they focus almost exclusively on central European prototypes, Fleischmann is relatively unknown outside that area. Most Fleischmann H0 products are made for the two-rail direct current system, but they make three-rail, Märklin-compatible versions of some locomotives, as well as replacement non-insulated wheelsets for use with their wagons on three-rail systems.

== History ==
As a result of the Nuremberg Race Laws and subsequent Aryanization of Jewish businesses, Fleischmann acquired Doll & Co. in 1938, also a manufacturer of model railway toys.

At the Nuremberg Toy Fair in 1952, Fleischmann first began presenting its very own lineup of H0 scale models. Building off their prior preference to use 2 rail DC, the technology was implemented into the H0 scale, making Fleischmann the first company to offer such a product line. Since its early introduction, it was the company's intention to completely exploit this technology, and give its fans the opportunity to determine the direction of the trains in advance. The tough metal tracks with discreet cardboard sleepers was indication of Fleischmann's objective, and was the base for the perfected track line used in layouts today. In conjunction with the track, and a full assortment of accessories for the model railroad layout, H0 tycoons were presented with a class 01 tender loco, a class 80 tank loco, and a class E44 electric loco since the very origin of the product line.

Fleischmann offers a model track with full profile rails, "thinking" turnouts, a turntable, and even a rack & pinion railway. Its more recent lineup includes the PROFI label, which consists of the pre-ballasted track, PROFI couplings for true close coupling operation, and even the tilt technology found in both the Pendolino and the ICE-T express train.

In February 2008 Fleischmann was taken over by Modelleisenbahn München GmbH, which also owns Roco. The two companies continue as separate brands under Modelleisenbahn München GmbH, while benefiting from economies of scale through joined development projects, marketing and procurement. In August 2017 the two companies were put up for sale by Modelleisenbahn München GmbH.

In March 2018 it was reported that the Fleischmann brand would from 2019 and onwards only cover the company's N scale products, while the H0 production would be designated the Roco brand. Many Fleischmann H0 models have since been issued as Roco H0 models.
