= Noch (model railroads) =

Noch GmbH & Co. KG, from Wangen im Allgäu (written NOCH by the company) is a manufacturer and importer of accessories for model trains, especially for building landscapes. It makes products for all common sizes of model trains.

== History ==
The company was founded in 1911 by Oswald Noch in Glauchau in Saxony, Germany. Because of the political reprisals and the nationalisation of the East German government at the time, the son of the company's founder, Erich Noch, saw no chance to expand his workshop. In 1957, he risked the move to the West. Leaving all of his assets and property behind, he began first in Munich and then in 1961 in Allgäu, to set up a new business.

Supported by his family, the company grew very quickly in the 1960s and 1970s. Soon, his son, Peter Noch, took over management of production and father and son together led the company to success. In 1978, the private company was converted to a GmbH & Co. KG (limited partnership company). After the death of the senior manager, Erich Noch, in October 1989, Peter Noch lead the company as the sole business manager. Dr. Rainer Noch, the son of Peter Noch and thus the fourth generation of the Noch family, has worked in the company since 1994. Father and son lead the company together until the death of Peter Noch in September 1997.

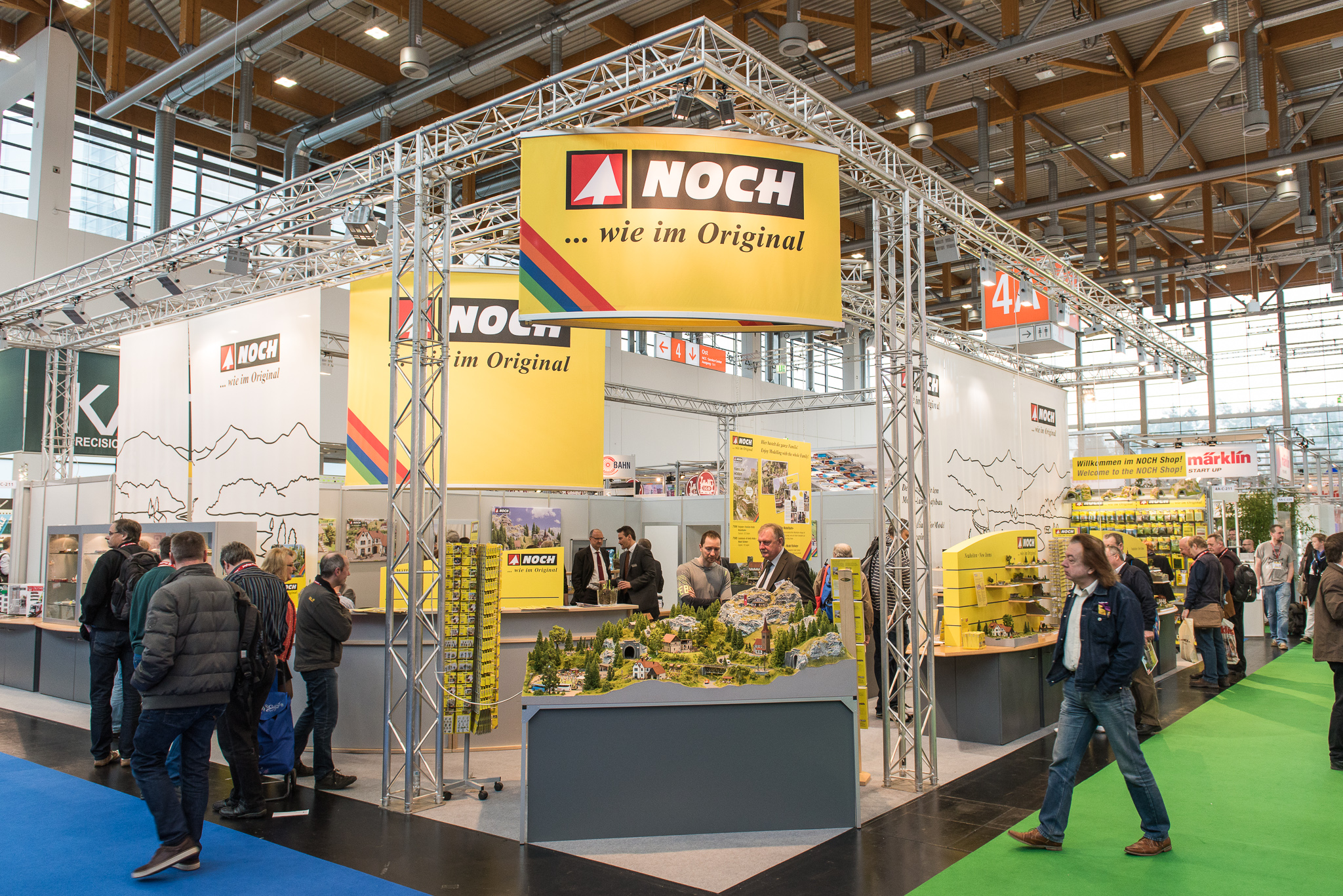
Noch at the International Toy Fair Nuremberg 2016

== Product Range ==
Noch is the German distributor for Athearn and Kato products. Noch is well known for a large range of materials for building landscapes, ready-made terrain of synthetic materials. Many Noch products are designed for use with Märklin, Fleischmann (model railroads), Kato and Trix trains. Noch offers over 1000 products for the model railway hobby including landscaping materials and accessories.

ZITERDES is a Noch line that offers dedicated gamers the tools and terrain pieces to create their Wargaming miniature environments: hybrid scenery; urban ruins with war-torn buildings; gaming table formats for alien war games; gaming forests and catacombs for Dungeons & Dragons miniatures; or a pirate theme. ZITERDES modular gaming tables (MGTs) can be detailed with scenic elements and combined with additional MGTs to develop the battlefield for Warhammer 40,000 alien gaming or wargame miniatures battlefield, for Urban Mammoth example.

Another product Noch is known for is plastic model railway figures.
