= HAG =

HAG logo

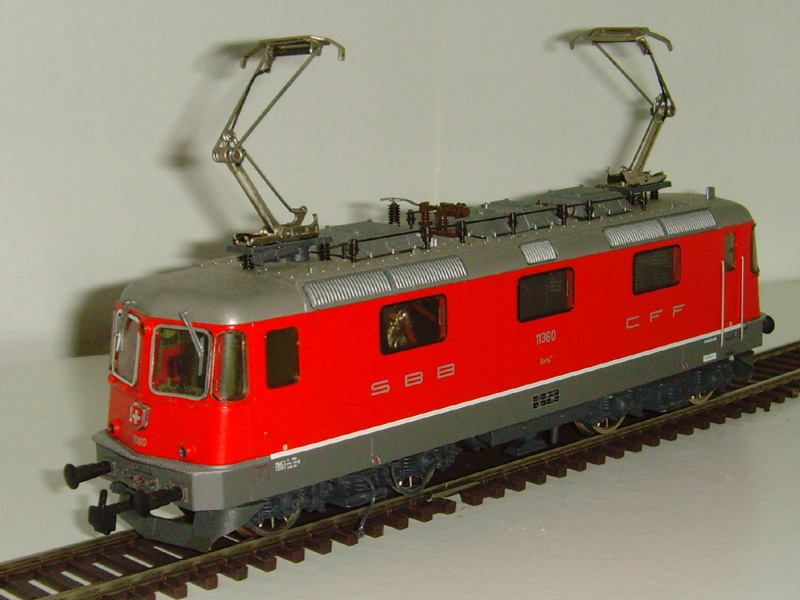
HAG locomotive

HAG is a Swiss maker of model trains. The company was founded by Hugo and Alwin Gahler on 1 April 1944 in St. Gallen, Switzerland.

The Gahler brothers originally manufactured model trains in O scale but due to competition, particularly by Märklin H0 scale, began the transition to H0 in 1954 with their final O scale set being manufactured in 1957.

Today, HAG manufactures die-cast metal model trains and is the primary manufacturer of HO scale Swiss model trains. Models are available in both two-rail DC and Märklin-compatible three-rail AC.

== History ==
The company was founded in 1944 by Hugo and Alwin Gahler in St. Gallen, and the name "HAG" came from the name as an abbreviation. The family business was managed from 1979 by Werner Gahler, the son of Alwin Gahler in the 2nd generation. In 1982 the company moved to Mörschwil (SG). On January 1, 2012, the Hag company was sold to Tekwiss Engineering from Hagedorn. The spare parts for the older generation vehicles were sold at the same time to the Amiba locomotive shed, where they are still available. Werner Gahler continued to work part-time for HAG Modelleisenbahnen until the end of 2012 (closure) by looking after the former factory shop in Mörschwil.

=== Stansstad location ===
At the end of October 2012, the production site in Mörschwil was closed with the move to Stansstad. The new location of the new company has been under the management of Heinz Urech since the beginning of November 2012.

=== Development of the workforce ===
As part of cost-cutting measures, the company had to lay off eight employees in January 2009 after natural fluctuation was no longer sufficient. The number of employees was then reduced to 23. At the time of the takeover by Tekwiss Engineering on January 1, 2012, HAG still had 12 employees in Mörschwil. Due to the abandonment of the production site in Mörschwil, the remaining 9 employees had to be made redundant.
