= Selley =

Selley is a surname. Notable people with the surname include:

- Harry Selley (1871–1960), English politician
- Ian Selley (born 1974), English footballer and coach
- Tal Selley (born 1980), Welsh rugby union player

== See also ==
- Seeley (surname)
- Selleys, company
