= Fulgurex =

- Founded: 1947
- Founder: Antonio Giansanti Coluzzi
- Website: http://www.fulgurex.ch/en/

Fulgurex is a Swiss-based manufacturer of Brass models of railway rolling stock. Count Antonio Giansanti Coluzzi founded the company in 1947.

== History ==
Fulgurex was created in 1947 as a specialized model train shop located in Lausanne, Switzerland by Count Antonio Giansanti Coluzzi, a tin plate train collector and the official distributor of the VB brand in Switzerland.

In 1962, in collaboration with Tenshodo, Fulgurex started to produce its own brass models. The first was a 141 R steam engine, reproduced in H0 scale. In 1967, it launched its first model in O scale, followed by 1 gauge in 1970, then N scale in 1983.

In the 1970s, Fulgurex produced 1/12 scale models of the Mercedes-Benz SSKL and Bentley 8 Litre.

A prototype of a Bugatti Type 59 was created but was never put into production because of the high price, which at the time was about US$895 ($5,355 in 2025 dollars).
