= 2 gauge =

Model railroad gauge

- Scale ratio: ca. 1:22.5
- Model gauge: 64 mm (2 1/2 in) later: 2 in (50.8 mm)
- Prototype gauge: 1,435 mm (4 ft 8 1/2 in) standard gauge

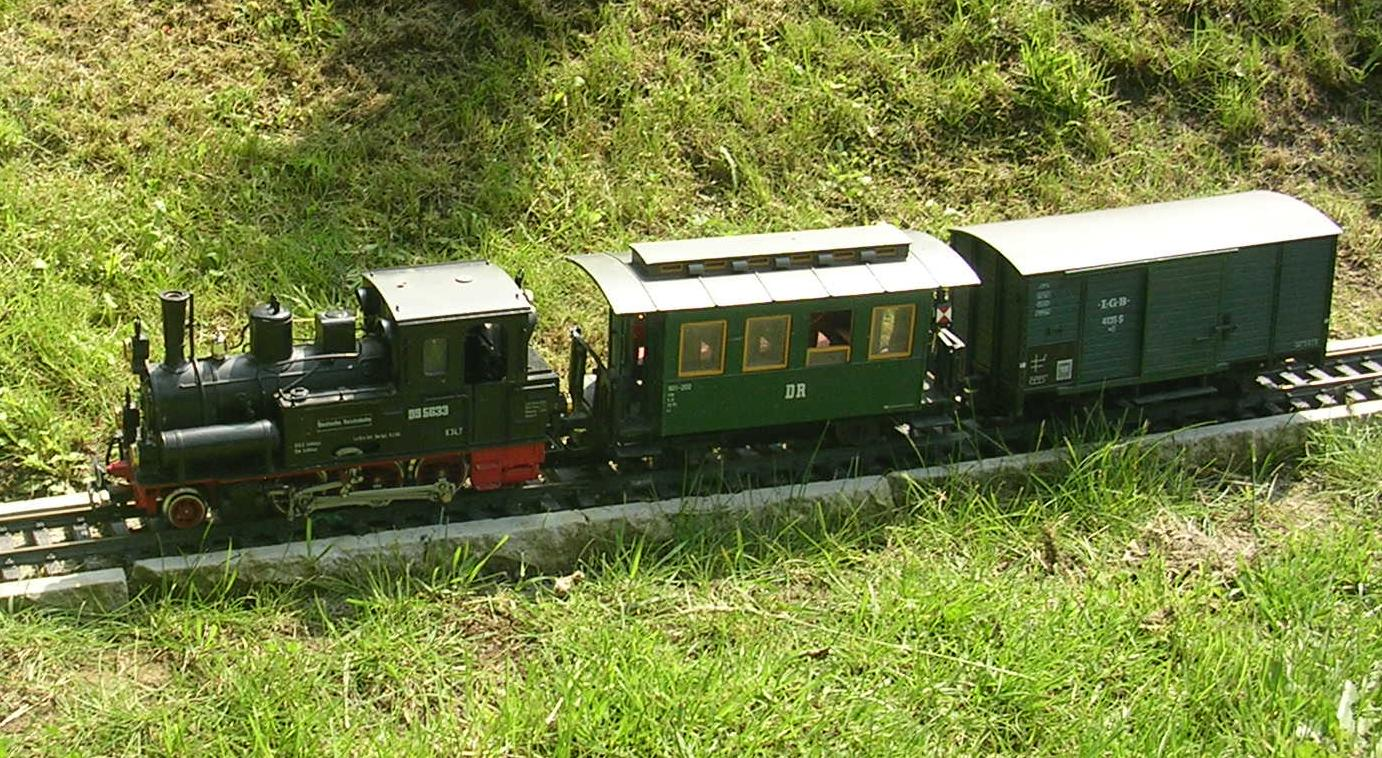
IIm gauge LGB Train.

Gauge 2 (also called 2 gauge or II gauge) is a model railway gauge, originally 64 mm (2 1/2 in), then standardised in 1909 at 2 in (50.8 mm), a 20% reduction and a change in definition: from mm to inch. It has since fallen into disuse. The gauge was introduced by Märklin at the Leipzig toy fair in 1891. Gauge 2 was equivalent to a 1:22.5 scale.

== Related scales and gauges ==
After the change to 2 in (50.8 mm) in 1909, 64 mm (2 1/2 in) gauge was standardised as 3 gauge (or III gauge).

European G gauge trains are built to the same II gauge scale, but with a narrow rail gauge of 45 mm (1.772 in) (the same as 1 gauge). This G gauge at 1:22.5 scale represents 1,000 mm (3 ft 3 3/8 in) metre gauge narrow-gauge railways. This scale-gauge combination is sometimes called IIm in European literature.

In the UK, Gauge 2 was 2 inches (50.8 mm) while Gauge 3 was 2 1/2 in (64 mm). From this, it follows that G gauge is sometimes, albeit rarely, referred to as 3m. A 2 inch (50.8 mm) gauge of standard gauge locos gives a scale of 1:28.25, not so far off the 1/29 used by some manufactures with 45 mm (1.772 in) gauge track. In the grand tradition of model rail gauges often being narrower than the full scale equivalent (00 scale being the classic example) this is deemed perfectly acceptable.

== See also ==
- 16 mm scale
- Rail transport modelling scales
