= Kadee =

Kadee Quality Products Co. is a model railroad manufacturer. They are best known for their couplers, but also produce rolling stock and accessories. The coupler line covers N and larger scales.

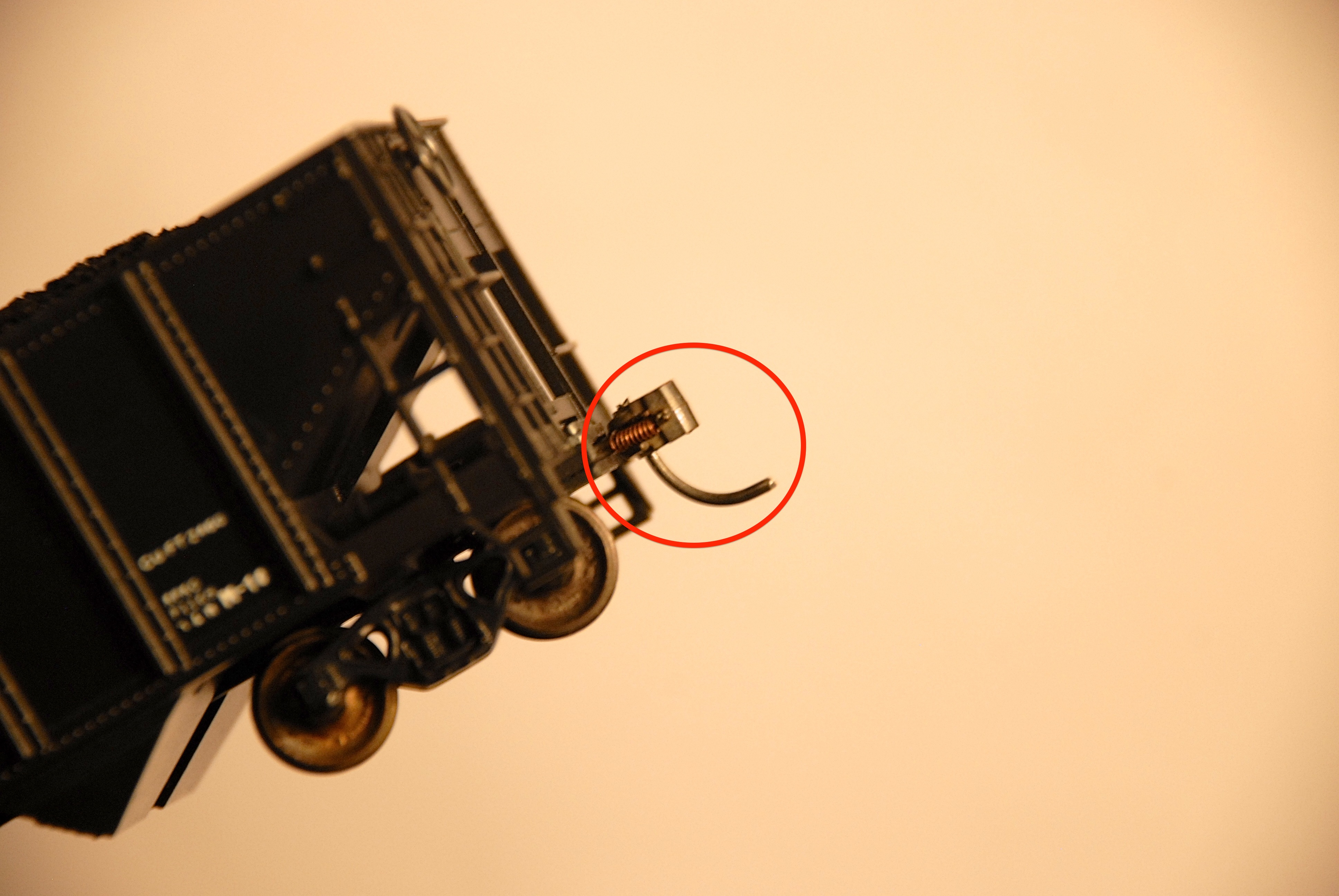
Kadee coupler, mounted on a model hopper car

Kadee Quality Products was established in 1940 by identical twin brothers Keith and Dale Edwards. They named their company using their own initials, K and D. They were both toolmakers and engineers.

Their claim to fame and financial success came when they developed and patented their HO knuckle coupler which became the de facto standard in the hobby in the USA, even if the NMRA defined X2f coupler was the norm. It is becoming increasingly adopted by serious modellers in the UK and other English-speaking countries because of its potential as a hands-free automatic and/or delayed coupler that permits shunting moves etc remote from the operator without the use of switched uncoupling devices. Its increasing popularity is helped by the production of couplers #17-#20 which fit into NEM 362 standard coupling pockets increasingly fitted to UK models by Bachmann, Dapol and Hornby.

Earlier models can be retro-fitted with #5 or #146 couplers by cutting off the couplings originally fitted and replacing with a draft box and the appropriate Kadee unit. Where problems arise, an underset or overset coupling shank can assist.

When the patent for those couplers expired, several manufacturers copied them.

In the early 1990s, the Edwards brothers had a falling out and parted ways. Dale took Kadee which is based in White City, Oregon. The business is in the hands of his son-in-law, Alan Vezzani. When the brothers split, Keith established Micro-Trains Line in Talent, Oregon, about 30 mi (48 km) from White City. Micro-Trains specialized in N scale products, expanding later to include Nn3 and Z scale.

Keith died on July 26, 2012, and Dale died on September 19, 2014.
