= Modelling British railway prototypes =

Modelling British railway prototypes is a hobby where railway modelling is applied to British prototypes. For historical reasons, British model scales have developed somewhat separately from those in other countries, and the commercial standards; 00 gauge and British N gauge are unique to British prototypes. The railways in Britain were for the most part standard gauge, and consequently most support focuses on these scales. Narrow gauge, and broad gauge standards also exist. British modellers tend to focus on British subjects, and most of the commercial support is British-based, but modellers of British prototypes exist across national boundaries.

== Standard gauge prototypes ==
=== Commercially available standards ===
There are two major commercial standards; 00 gauge (4 mm:foot, 16.5 mm gauge), and British N gauge (2.05 mm:foot, 9 mm gauge). Ready-to-run (RTR) equipment is available in both standards. Hornby Railways and Bachmann Branchline offer major RTR support in 00 gauge; Graham Farish (part of the Bachmann group) offer RTR support in N gauge.

Previously commercial support was available for British TT gauge (3mm:foot, 12mm gauge).

All three of these commercial standards suffer from being too narrow to accurately represent the track gauges, and as a result, finescale standards have been developed.

A recent development is TT:120, i.e. models of British prototypes in true 1:120 scale, which have been made available since 2022.

=== Finescale standards ===
As a consequence, of the track gauges, plus overscale track, finescale standards have been developed. These include EM gauge (4 mm scale, 18.2 mm gauge), P4 gauge (4 mm scale, 18.83 mm gauge), 3 mm finescale (3 mm scale, 14.2 mm gauge), 2 mm finescale (2 mm scale, 9.47 mm gauge). Others have adopted H0 gauge.

== Narrow gauge prototypes ==
The most straightforward way of modelling narrow gauge is to adopting a larger scale but with the track from the appropriate gauge. Thus, the most common standard for narrow gauge modelling are 009 (4 mm scale, 9 mm gauge) and 016.5 (7 mm scale, 16.5 mm gauge). These tend not to accurately represent real scales, so again there are products made to the smaller gauge but with sleeper spacing, etc., suitable for the larger scale narrow gauge trains.

== Societies ==
Societies include the following:

- British 1:87 Scale Society - support for British H0 scale
- Double O Gauge Association - support for 00 gauge
- 009 Society - support for 4 mm scale narrow gauge.
- EM Gauge Society - support for 4 mm finescale (EM and P4)
- Gauge 0 Guild - support for 0 gauge
- Historical Model Railway Society (HMRS), support for historical model railways.
- N Gauge Society (NGS) - support for N gauge (including international N gauge standards)
- Scalefour Society (support for P4, including Irish broad gauge and Great Western broad gauge)

== Magazines ==
Magazines include:

- Railway Modeller
- British Railway Modelling
- Model Rail
- Model Railway Express
- Hornby Magazine
