= American OO gauge =

American OO scale
- Scale: 4 mm to 1 foot
- Scale ratio: 1:76
- Model gauge: 19 mm (¾ in)
- Prototype gauge: 4 ft 8 1/2 in (1,435 mm) standard gauge

Detail from an American 00 gauge layout by Pierre Bourassa featuring a Lionel Hudson and a Schorr RS-2, before 1968

American OO gauge is a historical model railroad standard that has a scale of 4 mm to 1 foot (1:76) and utilises 19 mm (¾ in) for the standard gauge track.

The commercial production of model railway products for American OO gauge can be documented in the period from 1930 to 1968.

The difference between American OO gauge and British OO gauge – which is normally used in the UK – is that the former uses a track gauge of 19 mm instead of the 16.5 mm (0.65 in) typical of standard gauge in OO gauge and HO gauge.

It also differs from the British 4 mm finescale standards EM gauge, which has a gauge of 18.2 mm (0.717 in), and P4 gauge, which has a gauge of 18.83 mm (0.741 in).

== Trivia ==
The correct model gauge size is 19 mm, which is equivalent to ¾ in in contemporary American documents. The minimal difference between 0.750 in (19.05 mm) and 0.748 in (19 mm) remains negligible even today.

== Bibliography ==
- John Ericson. Model Railroading in American OO, 1930–68. Horn Notes Edition, Tempe (Arizona), 2021. ISBN 9798708216137.
