= British N gauge =

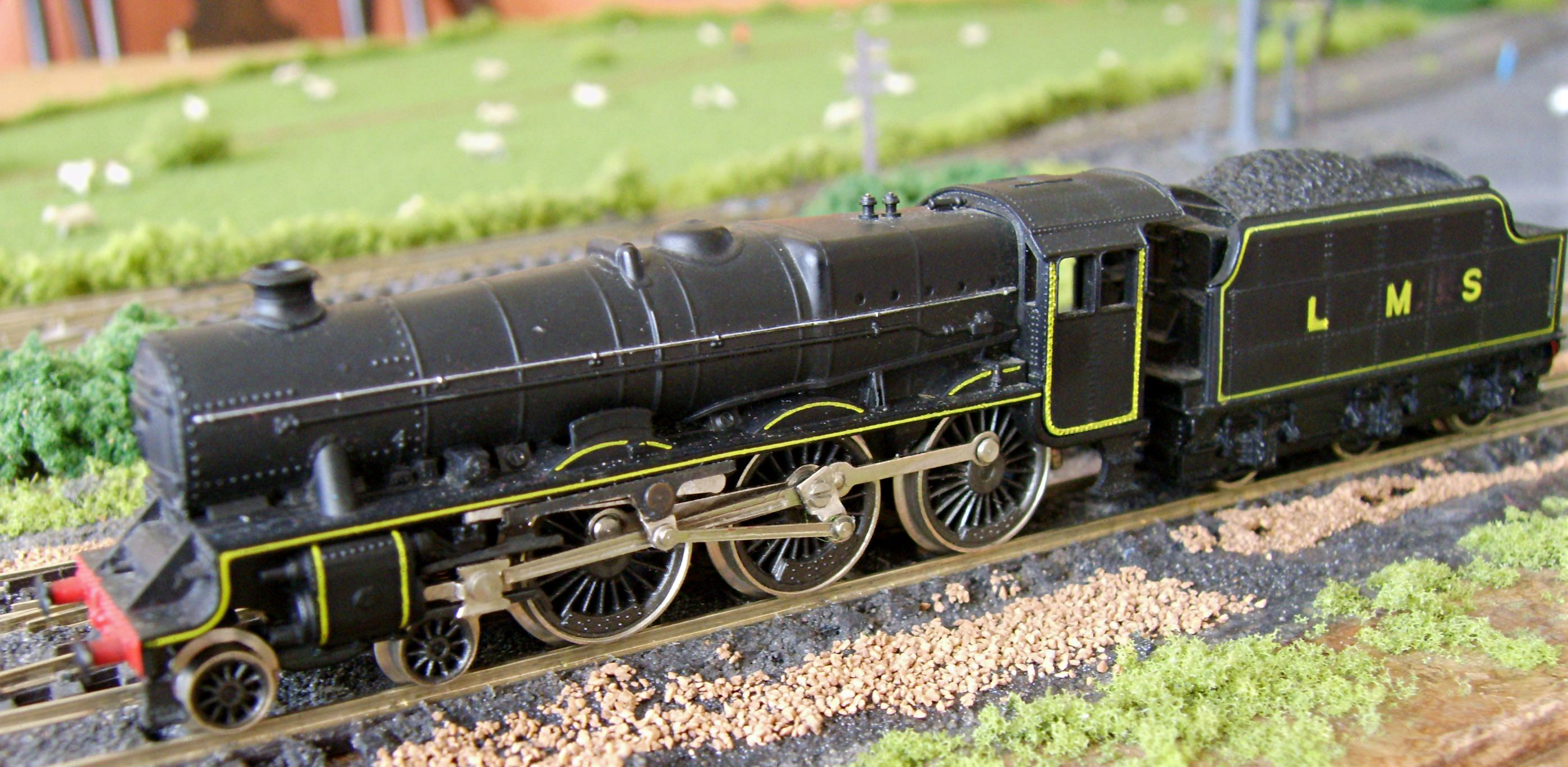
- Unnumbered Peco Jubilee
- Scale: 2 1/16mm to 1 ft (305 mm)
- Scale ratio: 1:148
- Model gauge: 9 mm (0.354 in)
- Prototype gauge: Standard gauge

British N gauge is a model railway scale and gauge. Rolling stock is to a scale of 1:148, and track is 9 mm (0.354 in) width as with all other N gauges, making track and rolling stock approximately 10% out of scale with respect to each other. The 9 mm (0.354 in) track width derives from a scale of 1:160 for 1,435 mm (4 ft 8 1/2 in) standard gauge rails.

== Background ==
When N gauge was developed it proved impossible to fit the then available motors into scale models of British prototype locomotives. British railways use a smaller loading gauge than those in Europe and America, resulting in smaller locomotives. A greater body size was required on the models to accommodate the motors, so instead of adopting the correct 1:160 scale, 1:148 was used. This allows larger models, but means that the gauge is not an accurate representation of standard gauge. A similar problem and solution was adopted with OO gauge and British TT gauge in Britain. However, since N scales to 1,332-millimetre (4 ft 4.4 in) gauge, it is less out of scale than OO (1,257 mm or 4 ft 1.5 in) or TT3 (1,219 mm or 4 ft 0 in) in representing the 1,435 mm (4 ft 8 1/2 in) standard gauge.

== Manufacturers ==
- Graham Farish is the most prolific manufacturer, producing British locomotives, rolling stock and buildings.
- Peco manufactures track and British outlined buildings in kit form and rollingstock.
- Dapol produces locomotives and rolling stock.
- Revolution Trains produce British locomotives and rolling stock
- Other companies produce kits for buildings, rolling stock and other parts - including Metcalfe models, Ratio, P&D Marsh and others.
- CJM Models produce hand built models of locomotives and other rolling stock.

=== Former manufacturers ===
- Minitrix/Hornby - prior to being taken over by Märklin Minitrix produced British outline rolling stock and locomotives, which were sold in association with Hornby.
- Lima - Produced some rolling stock and locomotives
- Hornby produced British outline buildings in N gauge as part of its Lyddle End range.

== Related scales ==
Finescale modellers modelling in this size use 2mm finescale, which has 9.42mm track and a scale of 1:152.
