= 0-0 =

0-0 or O-O may refer to:

- Emoticon for a person who wears glasses
- An informal instruction to watch the conductor of an orchestra, seen in orchestral parts
- Kingside castling in chess notation
- Love all, a '0-0' (zero-zero) score in tennis, and less commonly in badminton
- Object Oriented Programming, a style of modern computer programming
- A surrogate for ∞, the infinity symbol

== See also ==
- 00 (disambiguation)
- Zero Zero (disambiguation)
- Love All (disambiguation)
- "Nothing from Nothing", a song
