= 0O =

0O (zero O) or 0-O may refer to:

- 0o, 0_o, and 0.o, a kaomoji emoticon that may refer to shock, disturbance, or confusion
- 0-operand instruction set
- 0o, or zero object, a mathematics term for a simultaneously initial and terminal object
- 0O, also ZO, an abbreviation for zero order
  - Zero-order hold, model of the practical signal reconstruction done by a conventional digital-to-analog converter
  - Zero order process (chemistry), a chemical reaction in which the rate of change of concentration is independent of the concentrations
  - Zeroth-order logic, first-order logic without quantifiers
  - Zero-order process (statistics), a sequence of random variables, each independent of the previous ones
  - Zeroth-order approximation, an approximation of a function by a constant
- 0o, a prefix used in some programming languages to denote octal (base 8) integer literals

== See also ==
- O0 (disambiguation)
- 00 (disambiguation)
- OO (disambiguation)
