= Love All =

Love All may refer to:

- Love all, a '0-0' (zero-zero) score in tennis, and less commonly in badminton
- Love All (film), a 2023 Indian film
- Susi Susanti: Love All, a 2019 Indonesian film
- Love All (novel), a 1974 novel by Molly Parkin
- Love All (EP), a 2023 extended play by Jo Yu-ri
- "Love All" (song), a 2021 song by Drake

== See also ==
- Love All Play (disambiguation)
- Calvin Loveall (born 1962), American football player
- Duck (cricket), a term for the score '0' (zero) in cricket
- O-O, a chess move
- Nil (disambiguation)
- Zero Zero (disambiguation)
- 0-0 (disambiguation)
- 00 (disambiguation)
