= 2 mm scale =

Railway modeling finecast scale

2 mm finescale
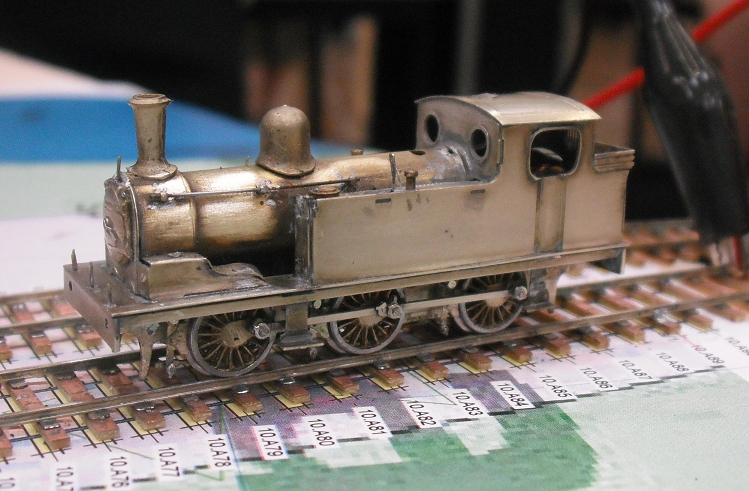
- A 2 mm scale steam locomotive in unpainted condition
- Scale: 2 mm to 1 ft
- Scale ratio: 1:152.4
- Model gauge: 9.42 mm (0.371 in)
- Prototype gauge: Standard gauge
- Website: 2mm Association

2 mm scale, often 2 mm finescale is a specification used for railway modelling, largely for modelling British railway prototypes. It uses a scale of 2 mm on the model to 1 foot on the prototype, which scales out to 1:152.4 The track gauge used to represent prototype standard gauge (4 feet 8 1/2 inches) is 9.42 mm (0.371 in). Track and wheels are closer to dead scale replicas than commercial British N.

== Standard ==
The 2 mm standards were proposed by Mr. H H Groves in the early 1960s and revised to their current specification in November 1963 by Geoffrey Jones. It is similar in size to the slightly larger British N scale at 1:148, and the slightly smaller European/American N scale at 1:160; though it predates both.

Since 2 mm scale is very close to the 1:148 British N scale, a hybrid specification can be modelled by re-wheeling proprietary British N-scale models to the 9.42 mm track gauge. This hybrid specification results in a track gauge equivalent to 4 feet 6 7/8 inches (1,394 mm), slightly narrower than the prototype 4 feet 8 1/2 inches. There is an advantage however in the narrower gauge as this allows more room for the outside motion of outside cylindered steam locomotives, which must be overscale in order to function correctly. This approach is often recommended for beginners. However, 2 mm-scale and hybrid-scale models do not usually sit well together due to the larger size of the latter.

=== Supplementary Standards ===
Like Protofour, 2 mm standards have been extended to several other prototypes of both wider and narrower gauge with the same tolerances such as Brunel's 7 ft 1/4 in (2,140 mm) gauge, Japan Rail's 1,067 mm (3 ft 6 in) narrow gauge and so on.

==== FiNescale Standard ====
The FiNescale standard in use for European prototypes is identical to 2mmFS, with the exception of a to-scale rail gauge of 9 mm (0.354 in).

=== Appreciation ===
One major effect of the standard is to improve the appearance of the track as opposed to N scale, where it is overly tall. Linking carriages with three link chains has been successfully achieved in using the standard.

== Support ==
No ready-to-run models are available in 2 mm scale, and although there is some availability of kits and components, some model-making skill is normally required.

There is an active association, The 2mm Scale Association, for modellers in this scale, who supply components, tools and jigs, publish a bi-monthly magazine, organise local groups, and promote modelling in the scale.

== Exhibition layouts ==
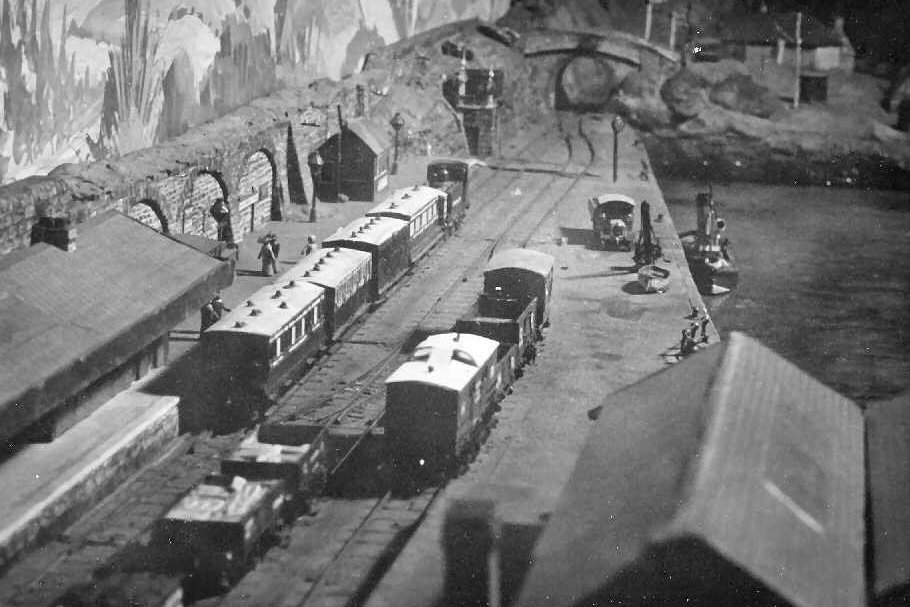
Section of the model railway layout built between 1946 and 1953 Inversnecky and Drambule Railway.

- An early example of a 2 mm layout was Rydes Vale which was created in the 1960s by H. H. Grove and his son.
- The development of the Kineton exhibition layout by the Leamington & Warwick Model Railway Society was feature in series in the British Railway Modelling magazine running from February 2016.

== See also ==
- N scale, with chapter OOO scale
- P4
- Proto:87
- ScaleSeven
- Rail transport modelling scales
