= OOS =

OOS or Oos may refer to:

== Geographical names ==
- Oos, Baden-Württemberg, district in Germany
- Oos (river), a river of Baden-Württemberg, Germany, running through Baden-Baden

== Science and industry ==
- Otdel Opytnogo Samolyetostroeniya (Russian) - a section for experimental aircraft construction and maker of the OOS Aviatourist
- Object-oriented scanning, a measurement method
- Occupational overuse syndrome, a human disorder
- Out Of Sample, testing performed to validate results in an experiment
- Out of specification

== Publications and media ==
- The Legend of Zelda: Oracle of Seasons, a video game
- Out of Sync (book), a 2007 autobiography of Lance Bass
- Origin of Symmetry, a 2001 album by Muse
- Out of Sight, a 1998 movie with Jennifer Lopez and George Clooney
- OxygenOS, version of the Android mobile operating system developed by Chinese smartphone manufacturer OnePlus.

== Other uses ==
- Out Of Stock or Stockout (sales)

== See also ==
- OO (disambiguation)
- 00s (disambiguation)
