= Zero order =

Zero order reaction

- Zero-order process (statistics), a sequence of random variables, each independent of the previous ones
- Zero order process (chemistry), a chemical reaction in which the rate of change of concentration is independent of the concentrations
- Zeroth-order approximation, an approximation of a function by a constant
- Zeroth-order logic, a form of logic without quantifiers

== See also ==
- Zero (disambiguation)
- 0O (disambiguation)
