= 4 mm =

4 mm may refer to:

- 4 mm caliber, gun cartridges between 4–5 mm diameter
- 4 mm scale, in rail transport modelling, 1:76.2 scale with rails 16.5 mm apart, representing standard gauge in Britain
