= TT3 (disambiguation) =

TT3 is Theban Tomb 3, located in Deir el-Medina, Egypt, the tomb of Pashedu.

TT3 may also refer to:

- 3 mm scale, also known as TT3, a model railway scale of 3 mm
- Para table tennis Class 3
- Third generation TransTrem, a guitar vibrato system
- Rabobank Development Team, a professional bicycle racing team, formerly Rabobank TT3

== See also ==
- TT3D: Closer to the Edge, documentary film about the Isle of Man TT motorcycle race
