= 00s =

00s or '00s may refer to:

== Periods of 10 years ==
- 2100s (decade)
- 2000s (decade)
- 1900s (decade)
- 1800s (decade)
- 1700s (decade)
- 1600s (decade)
- 1500s (decade)
- 1400s (decade)
- 1300s (decade)
- 1200s (decade)
- 1100s (decade)
- 1000s (decade)
- 900s (decade)
- 800s (decade)
- 700s (decade)
- 600s (decade)
- 500s (decade)
- 400s (decade)
- 300s (decade)
- 200s (decade)
- 100s (decade)
- 0s (decade)

== Periods of 100 years ==
- 2000s (century)
- 1900s (century)
- 1800s (century)
- 1700s (century)
- 1600s (century)
- 1500s (century)
- 1400s (century)
- 1300s (century)
- 1200s (century)
- 1100s (century)
- 1000s (century)
- 900s (century)
- 800s (century)
- 700s (century)
- 600s (century)
- 500s (century)
- 400s (century)
- 300s (century)
- 200s (century)
- 100s (century)
- 00s (century)

== Other uses ==
- Hundreds (the third column of magnitude in the decimal system)
- The decade spanning years 2000–2009
- The period from AD 1 to 99, almost synonymous with the 1st century (AD 1–100)
  - The period from AD 1 to 9, also referred to as the 1st decade or the 0s
- 00S, McKenzie Bridge State Airport in Oregon
- Any century or the term century in general

== See also ==
- OOS (disambiguation)
- 00 (disambiguation)
- OO (disambiguation)
