= 4 mm scale =

Model railway scale

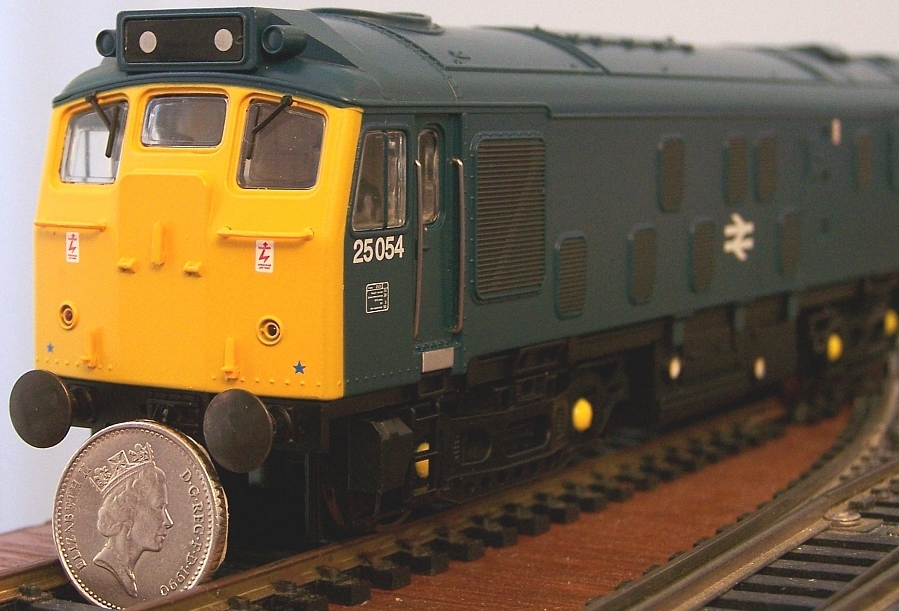
- 4 mm scale model of a British Rail Class 25 shown with a 18mm coin for size.
- Scale: 4 mm to 1 ft (305 mm)
- Scale ratio: 1:76.2

4 mm scale is the most popular model railway scale used in the United Kingdom. The term refers to the use of 4 millimeters on the model equating to a distance of 1 foot (305 mm) on the prototype (1:76.2). It is also used for military modelling.

For historical reasons, a number of different standards are employed.

== Standard gauge ==
Three different gauges are used for modelling standard gauge railways in the United Kingdom.

=== OO gauge ===
OO gauge uses 4 mm scale with 16.5 mm gauge track, which is inaccurately narrow since it is correct for HO scale (1:87.1). It is the most popular standard in the UK for 4 mm scale trains and is produced by the two main manufacturers in the UK. The traditional standard for wheels and track is a very coarse one with extremely oversize rails and flanges; in recent years, some manufacturers have switched to using the American National Model Railroad Association HO standard S-4 instead.

=== EM gauge ===
EM was originally defined to use 18mm as the track gauge (hence the name: Eighteen Millimetres). This was revised, and today EM gauge uses an 18.2 mm (0.717 in) track gauge, which is closer to accurate but not fully to scale. It was developed as an early improvement on the standard OO system. It is still popular with FineScale modellers today because it utilises larger than scale flanges on the wheels of rolling stock, and because point and crossing (P&C) work is a little easier due to an overscale flangeway clearance. These two concessions in scaling down the prototype make for reliable running. This factor explains the continued popularity of EM as a scale for finescale modellers working today.

=== P4 ===
P4, otherwise known as Protofour, or "18.83", is a close to exact 4 mm:1 ft replica of real-life track and wheel dimensions. The gauge of track built to these standards is 18.83 mm. Along with EM Gauge it is also a popular choice for finescale modellers working today. The main advantage of P4 over the other 4 mm standards is that the wheel flanges are approximately to scale and the flangeway gaps on P&C work are also close to scale. This is most noticeable in photographs of the model where in many cases is it almost impossible to detect that you are looking at a model, as opposed to the real thing. The disadvantages of near to scale flanges and flangeway crossings are that the trackwork has to be laid and built to very close tolerances and needs to be flat. If this is not the case then the reliability of rolling stock on the trackwork is compromised leading to poor running and derailments. This problem can, to an extent, be mitigated by the use of some form of suspension system in the locomotives and rolling stock used on the layout. There are different ways to do this and reference to one of the societies supporting modelling to this standard is recommended.

== Conversion to EM and P4 ==
00 models can be converted to work on EM or P4 by replacing or reprofiling wheels, fitting the correct width axles and moving the locomotive or carriage frames outward to suit. Modern products from Hornby, Bachmann UK and others have some element of springing in their suspension to aid this, and many aftermarket chassis kits exist from a variety of vendors such as high level kits, Comet, DJH, and others. Products intended for the more dedicated modeller are generally designed to be buildable to fit any of the three standards, though one side effect of underscale locomotive frames for 00 gauge is that the width between the frames is limited, which can limit the size of electric motor that may be fitted.

== Irish Broad Gauge ==
Irish Broad Gauge is 5' 3". OO models are available from Bachmann and have previously been available from Lima. P4 standards can also be used with a track gauge of 21 mm.

== Narrow gauge ==
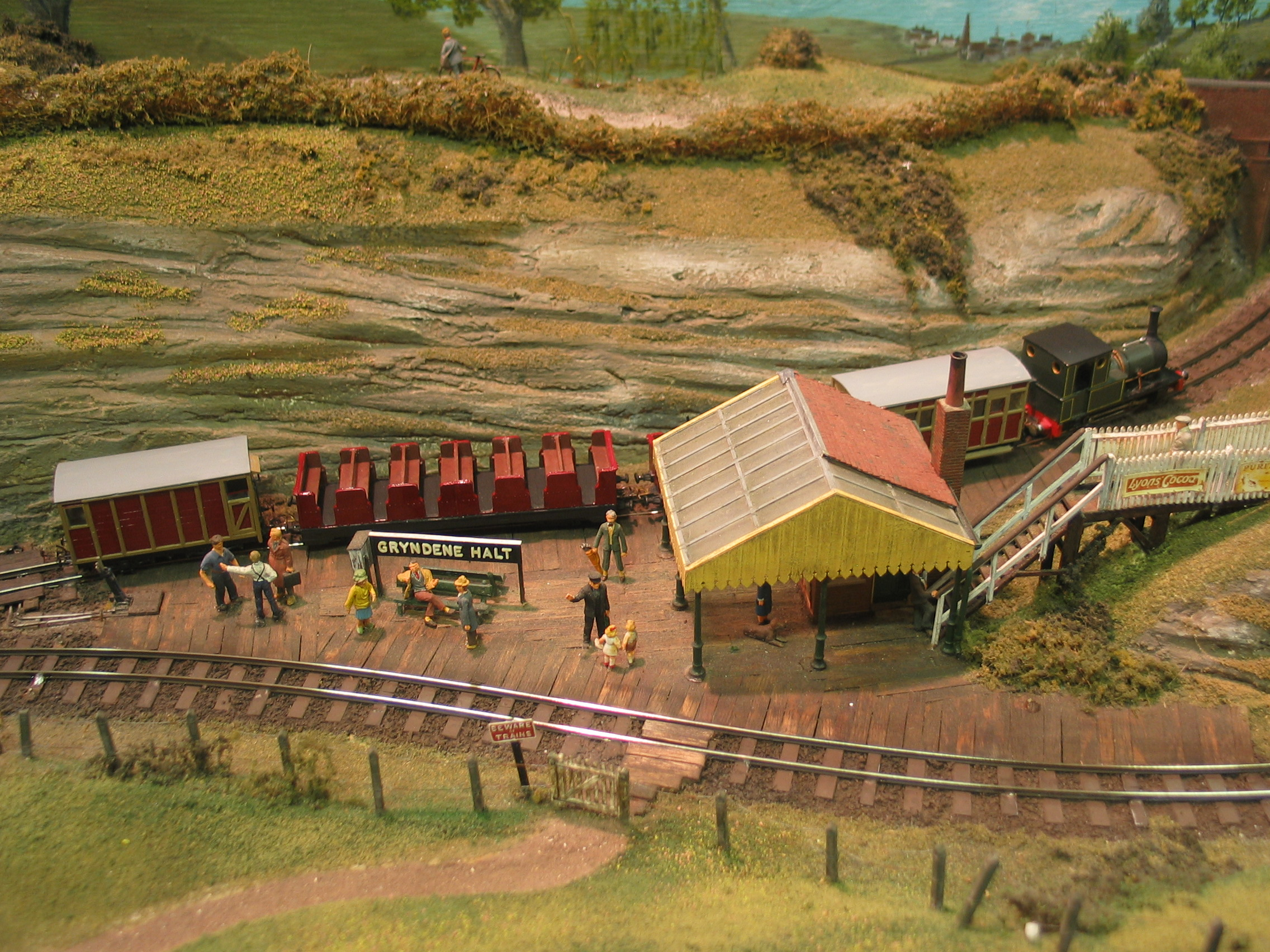
Gryndene Halt, a station on Evaleight Light Railway, by the Sussex Downs 009 group

=== OO9 ===
9 mm gauge (N gauge) track used to model 2'–2'6" gauge prototypes.

=== OOn3 ===
12 mm gauge (TT gauge) track used to model 3 foot (910 mm) prototypes which were common in Ireland and the Isle of Man.
