= 00 =

00, double zero or variants may refer to:

== Arts and entertainment ==
- 00 Agent, a fictional agent with a license to kill in the James Bond media
- Symphony No. 00 (Bruckner), an alternate name for Bruckner's Symphony in F minor
- "Double Zeros" (Runaways), an episode of Runaways
- Double Zero Records, a record label

== Science and technology ==
- 00 gauge, or OO gauge, a standard for model railways
- 00, a common international call prefix
- 00, an American wire gauge size
- 00, a Very Fine grade of steel wool
- 00, a shotgun ammunition size for buckshot
- Jaguar Type 00, an electric concept car

== Other uses ==
- Years such as 1900, 2000, or 2100
- Size 00, a women's clothing size in the US catalog sizes system
- 00, a pocket on some roulette wheels
- 00, a grade of Italian flour

== See also ==
- Zero Zero (disambiguation)
- Double O (disambiguation)
- 0 (disambiguation)
- 00s (disambiguation)
- OO (disambiguation)
- 0O (disambiguation)
- O0 (disambiguation)
- Leading zero
- Mobile Suit Gundam 00, an anime series
