= 3 mm scale =

Model railway scale

3 mm finescale
- Scale: 3 mm to 1 ft (305 mm)
- Scale ratio: 1:101.6
- Model gauge: 9 mm (0.354 in) (3' gauge); 13.5 mm (0.531 in) (Scotch); 14.2 mm (0.559 in) (standard); 15.75 mm (0.620 in) (Irish); 16.5 mm (0.65 in) (Indian); 21 mm (0.827 in) (Brunel)
- Prototype gauge: 3 ft (914 mm); 1,372 mm (4 ft 6 in) (Scotch gauge); 1,435 mm (4 ft 8 1/2 in) (standard); 5 ft 3 in (1,600 mm) (Irish gauge); 1,676 mm (5 ft 6 in) (Indian broad gauge); 2,134 mm (7 ft) (Brunel gauge)
- Website: http://www.3mmsociety.org.uk/

British TT gauge
- Scale: 3 mm to 1 ft (305 mm)
- Scale ratio: 1:101
- Model gauge: 12 mm (0.472 in) TT gauge
- Prototype gauge: Standard gauge

3 mm scale, also implemented as 3 mm finescale, is a model railway scale of 3 mm : 1 ft (305 mm) used for British prototypes. Introduced by Tri-ang Railways in 1957 as British TT gauge, it sits approximately halfway between British N gauge and OO gauge but is not as popular as either and there is no longer any mass manufacturer ready-to-run support. However, it remains in existence as a niche, enthusiast-driven format.

While Tri-ang's "British TT gauge" retains the same 12mm tracks as regular TT gauge, its models were built to 1:101.6 scale rather than the standard 1:120. "Finescale" versions of the 3mm scale use different track gauges for greater accuracy.

British TT gauge differs from the "TT:120" format commercially relaunched in the UK in 2022, as TT:120 uses the standard 1:120 TT scale throughout.

== British TT gauge ==
British TT, also known as TT3, was introduced by Tri-ang Railways in 1957 as ready-to-run models.

In order for the available mechanisms to fit the small British prototypes, Tri-ang enlarged the scale from 1:120 (standard TT) to 1:101.6, but without increasing the tracks' 12mm gauge to compensate.

As a result of this compromise, the track width on British TT gauge is no longer to scale (i.e. too narrow).

Tri-ang Hornby (as it was known by then) discontinued their TT line in the mid-1960s due to increased competition from N scale, in order to concentrate on the OO market.

The abandonment of British TT by its main commercial supporter prompted enthusiasts to form the 3mm Society which supported and kept alive the format during subsequent decades.

== 3mm finescale ==
The inaccuracies of the British TT gauge led to the development of two finescale 3mm standards.

By far the more common of these uses 14.2 mm (0.559 in) gauge track, which is accurate. Some modellers choose to use slightly narrower 13.5 mm (0.531 in) track due to the necessary oversize motion of outside-cylindered steam locomotives.

== Other gauges ==
Other gauges are also used to model other prototypes (Irish broad gauge, Brunel gauge). For narrow gauges, N gauge 9 mm track represents 3 ft (914 mm) gauge; Z gauge 6.5 mm (0.256 in) track represents to 2 ft 2 in (660 mm) gauge.

The 3mm Society caters for all modellers of 3 mm scale.

== Comparison with relaunched British "TT:120" scale ==
In 2022, the manufacturers Peco and then Hornby Hobbies announced plans to relaunch TT scale models running on standard 12mm track.

However, TT:120- as the system is being marketed- uses the standard TT scale of 1:120 (or 2.54 mm to 1 ft) throughout rather than the 1:101.6 scale used by the older "British TT gauge" and other "3 mm to 1 ft" variants.

As a result, there are significant differences in scale between models produced for the 3mm and the TT:120 systems.

== See also ==
- Rail transport modelling scales
