= O0 =

O0 may refer to:

- N47D20-O0, model of the BMW 5 Series
- N53B30-O0, model of the BMW N53 with improved maximum power to 268ㅡ

== See also ==
- kaomoji
- OO (disambiguation)
- 00 (disambiguation)
- 0O (disambiguation)
- Ozero
