= NTrak =

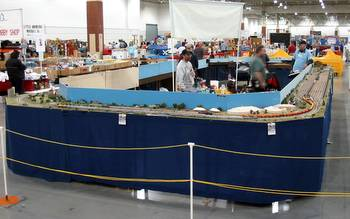
An NTrak layout set up for operations at Trainfest, a model train show in Milwaukee, WI in 2004.

NTRAK (all upper case letters) is one of several model railroad module standards. It is the most popular standard for use in United States N scale. NTRAK allows modelers to participate in a large layout but only invest a small amount of space at their own home. They can interchange (connect and operate) their module with any club or group that follows NTRAK standards.

== History ==
The first prototype NTRAK modules were designed and built by Ben Davis, then they were first displayed in 1973 at the Model Railroad Industry Association show in Costa Mesa, California. Following their success at this show, the modules made their debut at the 1974 National Model Railroad Association's national convention in San Diego, California. Ben was a founding member of the Belmont Shores Model Railroad Club; the club, which has helped launch the model manufacturing careers of many of its members, is now considered by many as the organization where NTRAK started.

== Module standards ==
NTRAK modules are marked by their standard three running tracks (two are "mainline" tracks and the third is the "branchline" track) that are required on all modules. These three tracks are set on 1.5-inch (38 mm) centers near the viewing side of the modules. The tracks are labeled from the viewing aisle by color, starting with Red for the outermost (closest to the viewing aisle) track, Yellow for the center track and Blue for the innermost track. The three tracks are electrically isolated from each other and from any other (optional) tracks on the module.

Basic modules are built with a surface area of 2 by 4 feet (0.61 by 1.22 m). The official standard allows up to an extra 6 inches (152.4 mm) of surface area on either the aisle side, operator's side, or both (which can lead to a module that is 3 feet (0.91 m) wide). Module lengths are typically extended in 2-foot (0.61 m) increments, typically, up to 8 feet (2.4 m) long, but can be almost any length, limited only by the modeler's abilities to build and transport the modules. Modules built to non-standard lengths must also be built with consideration of the standard lengths; where appropriate, the modeler must also build a short bridge module so that their specific module set uses up a section of layout that is evenly divisible by 4-foot (1.22 m)-long modules.

Modules were originally connected electrically with 18 gauge wire utilizing two-conductor Cinch Jones 302 series connectors. The Anderson Powerpole PP30 connector and 12 gauge wire was adopted as a recommend practice in 2005. and as a standard for newly constructed modules in 2011. The use of the older Cinch-Jones connector has been deprecated, but is still permitted on legacy modules.

In addition, new standards have been written to comply with the new National Fire Code. These include the prohibition of module-mounted power strips. These new standards are available for review at the NTRAK website,

== Alternatives ==
In recent years other, often complementary, module standards have cropped up to address perceived deficiencies with NTrak's standard.

=== oNeTrak ===
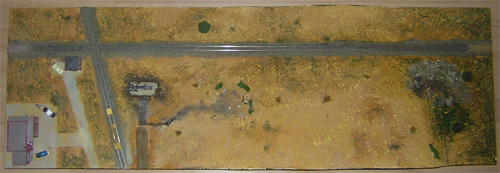
A oNeTrak module

One example of these perceived deficiencies is the requirement for NTrak modules to have three mainline tracks. On the prototype, except in a few areas where traffic density dictates the need for three (or more) mainline tracks, most mainlines throughout North America are single or double track.

oNeTrak is designed around the concept of a single track mainline and as such allows for a greater range of railroad scenes to be modeled compared to Ntrak. oNeTrak also allows for more prototypical operations as trains on a single track main often have to meet and/or pass each other during operation of the layout.

=== T-TRAK ===
T-TRAK is a standard that started in Japan and was published in the NTRAK Newsletter in 2001 and is now the most popular N-Scale module standard in North America.

=== BeNdTrack ===
Bend Track is designed around a double track mainline which traverses each module twice, once on each side, with flexible module shape and no "pit" area.

== See also ==
- Anderson Powerpole connector
