= Finescale standard =

Finescale standards (or fine standards) are model railway standards for wheels and track whose dimensions are closer to scale than those of mass-produced commercial models. Ready-to-run equipment uses deep, wide wheel flanges and broad track flangeways—and, in British 4 mm scale, an underscale track gauge—to ensure reliable running and ease of manufacture; finescale standards reduce these compromises to bring wheel and track dimensions, and their appearance, nearer to the prototype.

The term covers a range of fidelity rather than a single specification, and is used in two senses: broadly, for any standard finer than the coarse commercial norm; and more narrowly, for an intermediate level between the coarse standards and the exact-scale ("Proto" or "scale") standards that reproduce prototype wheel and rail contours to the closest tolerances. Finescale standards are generally defined and maintained by modellers' societies rather than by manufacturers, and the concept is most developed in British railway modelling, where commercial track gauges depart most from scale.

== Background ==
The relationship between wheel and rail is the main determinant of reliable running. Mass-produced models compromise it for durability, cost and tolerance of sharp model curves: flanges are made deeper and wider than scale, treads are widened, and flangeways at points (turnouts) are opened up, all of which are conspicuous once a train has passed through a scene.

In British modelling a further compromise affects the track gauge itself. OO gauge, the dominant commercial standard for British prototypes, places 4 mm-to-the-foot models on 16.5 mm gauge track. The anomaly dates to the 1920s, when manufacturers fitting the available HO (3.5 mm/ft) mechanisms into the smaller British loading gauge enlarged the bodies to 4 mm/ft but continued to run them on HO-gauge track rather than tool new 4 mm track; the result is a gauge roughly 2 mm too narrow for the scale. Reducing or eliminating these compromises—narrower flanges and flangeways, finer rail, and in 4 mm scale a wider, more nearly correct gauge—is the purpose of the various finescale standards.

== History ==
Early attempts to standardise British model railway practice were made by the British Railway Modelling Standards Bureau (BRMSB). Re-formed in 1945, it was dominated by trade members and largely preserved pre-war practice, adopting EM gauge as a gesture towards correct proportions; even so, its 18 mm gauge represented only about 4 ft 6 in (1,370 mm) rather than the prototype's 4 ft 8 1/2 in (1,435 mm). The BRMSB recognised F. W. Chubb's 18 mm "Scale OO" alongside the 16.5 mm "Nominal OO" standards—the origin of what is now called EM gauge. A recurring criticism of the early standards was that they specified secondary dimensions without first fixing wheel and rail contour, the primary control of reliable running.

Dissatisfaction with these compromises led modellers to form specialist societies to develop and support finer standards. The Eighteen Millimetre Gauge Society was founded in 1955 to promote EM, later refining the gauge from 18 mm to 18.2 mm. The 2mm Scale Association adopted dead-scale standards for 2 mm/ft modelling. The move to fully exact scale produced Protofour (P4) in 4 mm scale, with a true 18.83 mm gauge, and equivalents in other scales such as ScaleSeven (S7), whose group was formed in 1989.

== Degrees of fidelity ==
Finescale practice spans three broad levels. The coarsest are the commercial standards used for ready-to-run models, with deep flanges and broad flangeways—for example NMRA RP-25 code 110 wheels, or OO's underscale gauge. An intermediate "finescale" level narrows the flanges and flangeways and improves appearance while keeping practical tolerances, sometimes with a gauge closer to (though not exactly) scale; EM gauge, 2 mm finescale and 3 mm finescale are examples. The finest are the exact or dead-scale standards, often labelled "Proto" or "Scale", which reproduce prototype-derived wheel and rail contours to the closest tolerances, such as P4, ScaleSeven, Proto:87 and Proto:48.

The boundary between the upper two levels is not sharp. 2 mm finescale, for instance, uses a dead-scale 9.42 mm gauge but practical wheel and track tolerances, and is described as standing to British N gauge as EM does to OO—a pragmatic finescale solution rather than an exact-scale one comparable to P4.

== Standards by scale ==
The principal British standards for the standard-gauge prototype, from coarsest to finest:

British finescale and exact-scale standards (standard-gauge prototype)
| Scale | Commercial standard | Finescale (intermediate) | Exact / dead-scale | Principal society |
|---|---|---|---|---|
| 2 mm (1:152) | British N gauge, 9 mm (0.35 in) | 2 mm finescale (2FS), 9.42 mm (0.371 in) | — | 2mm Scale Association |
| 3 mm (1:101.6) | TT3, 12 mm (0.47 in) | 3 mm finescale, 14.2 mm (0.559 in) | — | 3mm Society |
| 4 mm (1:76.2) | OO gauge, 16.5 mm (0.650 in) | EM gauge, 18.2 mm (0.717 in) | P4, 18.83 mm (0.741 in) | EM Gauge Society; Scalefour Society |
| 3.5 mm (1:87) | HO scale, 16.5 mm (0.650 in) | NMRA code 88 | Proto:87, 16.5 mm (0.650 in) | NMRA Proto:87 SIG |
| 7 mm (1:43.5) | O gauge, 32 mm (1.26 in) | — | ScaleSeven (S7), 33 mm (1.30 in) | ScaleSeven Group; Gauge 0 Guild |

In 3.5 mm/HO and larger British O scale the commercial track gauge is already close to correct, so the finescale and exact standards differ from commercial practice chiefly in wheel and rail contour rather than gauge; in 4 mm and 2 mm scale they also widen the gauge towards scale. Finescale standards exist for narrow-gauge modelling as well, such as O14 (7 mm scale on 14 mm gauge, for 2 ft prototypes).

== Standards organisations ==
Finescale standards are typically maintained by scale- or gauge-specific societies, among them the 2mm Scale Association, the 3mm Society, the EM Gauge Society, the Scalefour Society, the Gauge 0 Guild and the ScaleSeven Group. In North America the National Model Railroad Association (NMRA) defines wheel and track standards, including separate "Fine" and "Proto" (exact-scale) specifications, and in continental Europe standards are published by MOROP under the NEM system.

== See also ==
- Rail transport modelling
- List of rail transport modelling scale standards
- Rail transport modelling scales
- Modelling British railway prototypes
