= British Railway Modelling =

Monthly hobby periodical (first issued in 1993)

BRM (British Railway Modelling)
- BRM November 2013
- Editor: Edited by an Editorial Team
- Former editors: David Brown, John Emmerson, Ben Jones, Debbie Wood, Andy McVittie
- Staff writers: Phil Parker, Steven Draper
- Categories: Model railways, prototype railways (Traction)
- Frequency: 4 weekly
- Publisher: Warners Group Publications plc
- First issue: 1993
- Company: Warners Publishing
- Country: UK
- Based in: Bourne, Lincolnshire
- Language: English
- Website: About British Railway Modelling magazine
- ISSN: 0968-0764

British Railway Modelling (BRM) is a monthly British magazine about model railways published by Warners Group Publications plc. It has been in publication since 1993, originally under the tagline "A Colourful New Look at Hobby". The magazine has been based in Bourne, Lincolnshire, since its inception.

== History ==
The magazine was launched in 1993 issue and the first editor was David Brown, an experienced journalist with a passion for model railways. Initially the use of colour throughout the magazine was a key selling point when many other magazines were predominantly printed in black and white. The magazine covered areas traditionally covered by the established model railway press, such as layouts, weathering, kit building and scratch building.

From the outset, the magazine featured minority scales and standards. The premier issue had an EM gauge layout on its cover and by its fourth issue featured a 2mm Finescale on the cover, Helsby, Tumill & Haddon, very much a minor scale. Other minority and finer scale standards were featured from the outset too. The magazine also had many well known modellers within the hobby, featuring from its early issues such as Jack Ray, first chairman of the Gauge O Guild and owner of the well known Crewchester garden railway, and David Jenkinson.

While leaning towards coverage of high quality modelling and prototype information, BRM has also covered the collectable end of the hobby. BRM featured for many years The Chronicle of Lock's Siding, written by the Reverend Alan Cliff and was the longest running continuous monthly series by a freelance writer in the history of the world's model railway press.

John Emerson followed David Brown as editor, Brown remaining as Managing Editor for a number of years. After Emerson stepped down after many years, Ben Jones took over but left as editor in early 2017 to join the model railway manufacturer, Heljan. He was succeeded by Andy McVittie and then Debbie Wood as 'Brand Content Editor' across Warners' portfolio of magazines, websites, email newsletters and exhibitions. The BRM staff team includes Steven Draper and Phil Parker.

The magazine is published every four weeks, with new volumes commencing with the April edition.

== RMweb ==
RMweb was started by the late Andy York, evolving as a private website forum over a number of years. Funding initially was by means of donation drives, especially needed when the site became very popular and busy, increasing the costs. York started the forum, with the support of his partner John, while he was unemployed which allowed him to give a lot of time to the project following the breakup of his Right Said Fred tribute act. The site was acquired by Warners Group Publications with Andy remaining as editor, assisted by Phil Parker.

RMweb enjoys close links with many manufactures including, Accurascale, Hornby, Dapol, Kernow Model Centre, Bachmann, Rapido Trains UK, Revolution Trains.

RMweb celebrated its 10th birthday on 15 March 2015.

== Model railway exhibitions ==
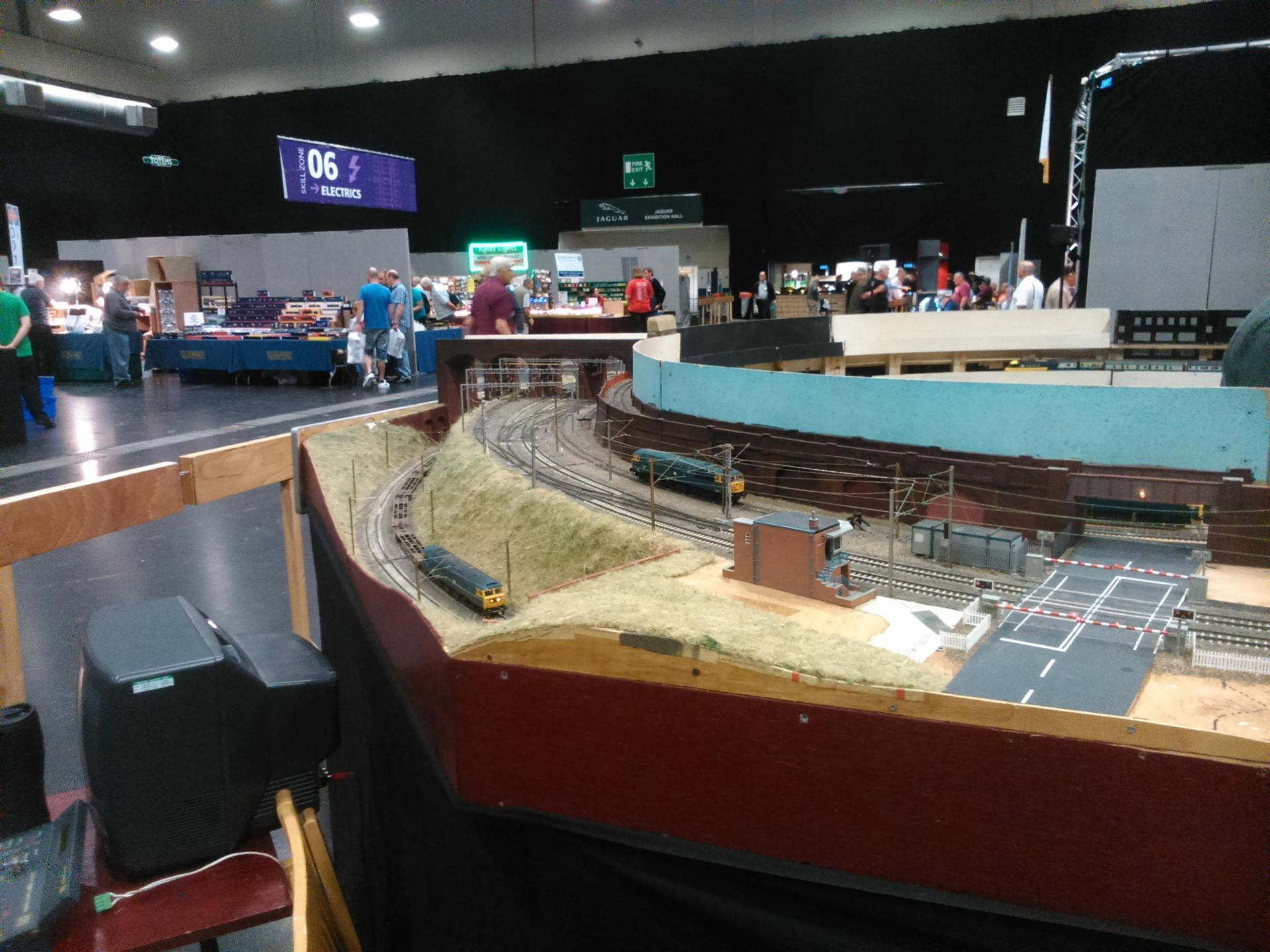
Crowds at RMweb Live 2014.

The magazine has also put on its own exhibitions throughout the country - venues have included Doncaster, Harrogate, Peterborough, Bristol, Manchester and The London Festival of Railway Modelling at Alexandra Palace. The latter is in association with The Model Railway Club which is the oldest model railway society in the world, having been formed in 1910, demonstrating BRM's place within the hobby.

BRM's first show was The Festival Of Railway Modelling at Doncaster Racecourse in 1997. The first show drew on the many layouts which had featured in BRM since 1993.

As well as BRM's own shows, RMweb hosted its own show at the Ricoh Stadium in Coventry 2014 and it was intended for this to be the first of an annual RMweb show, however on 14 December 2014, Andy York announced that they would not "be holding a comparable event during 2015 at the same venue" as there were insufficient visitor numbers.
