= Love All Play =

Love All Play may refer to:

- Love All Play (novel series), a 2011 Japanese novel series and its anime adaptation
- Love All Play (TV series), a 2022 South Korean television series
