= Proto:87 =

Fine-scale alternative to HO scale models

- Scale: 3.5 mm to 1 foot
- Scale ratio: 1:87.1
- Standard(s): Proto:87
- Model gauge: 16.5 mm (0.65 in)
- Prototype gauge: 1435 mm (4 ft 8 1/2 in) standard gauge

Proto:87 is a set of model railroad engineering standards that originated in the United Kingdom and continental Europe in the late 1960s, providing a fine-scale alternative to traditional HO scale. A special interest group of the same name was later formed within the National Model Railroad Association in 1994.

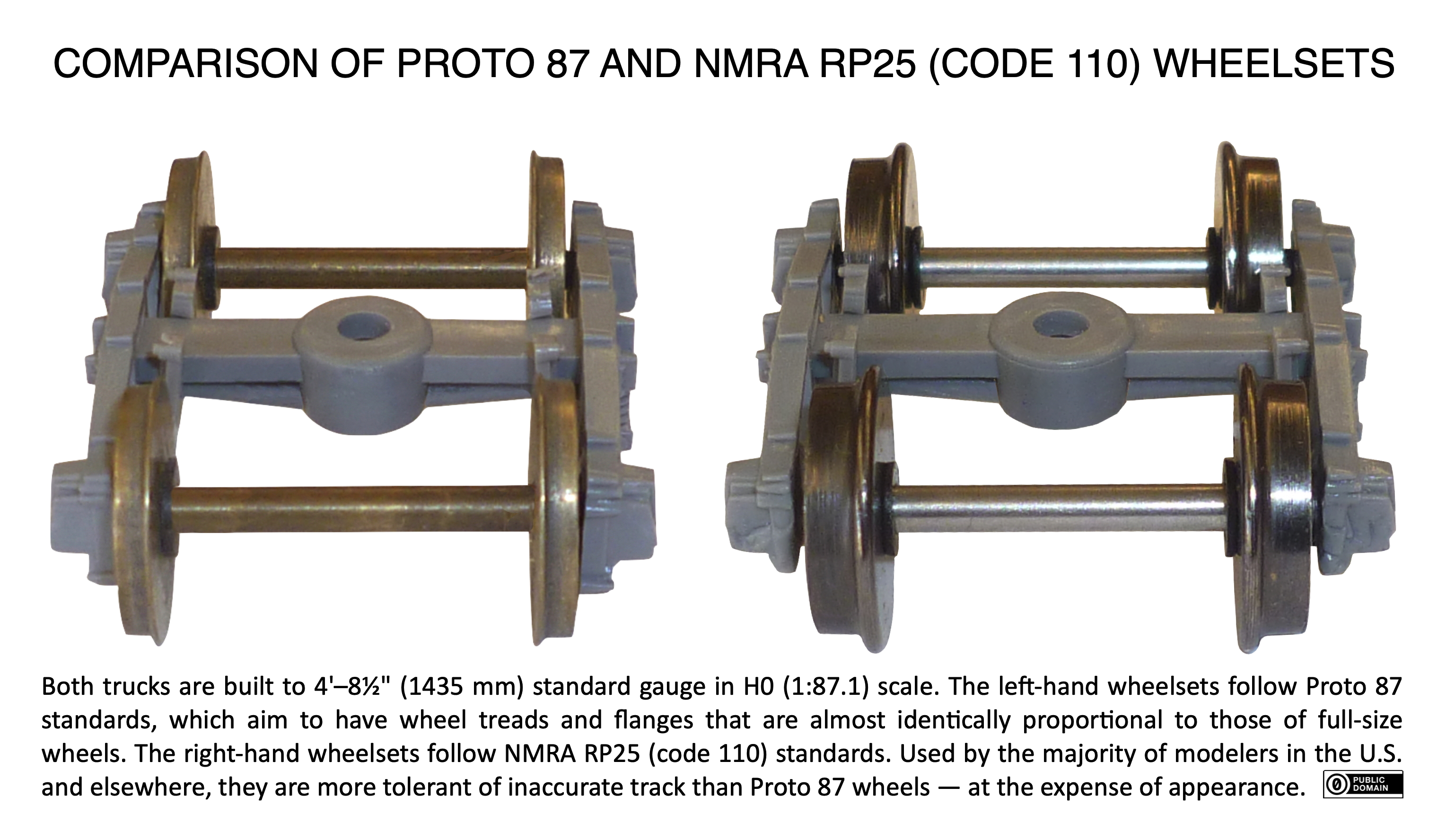
Two trucks set to the same gauge: the one on the left has wheels made to Proto:87 standards and on the right the wheels are made to much coarser NMRA RP25 (code 110) standards

Due to manufacturing restrictions and considerations such as durability, ease of operation and price, most model railroad products feature significant compromises that inhibit their viability as accurate scale models of their prototypes. The most visible of these are wheels and track, which can be significantly thicker than the prototype. The desirability of realistic wheel dimensions among some modelers helped spawn the Proto:87 movement, which is backed by many manufacturers such as NorthWest Short Line.

== History ==
The Proto:87 standards originated in Britain and continental Europe and were later formalized in North America by the National Model Railroad Association.

=== British origins ===
Proto:87 originated in the United Kingdom and continental Europe in the late 1960s, developed in parallel with the British Protofour (P4) standards. A finescale standard for 3.5 mm-to-the-foot scale (1:87.1) grew out of the Model Railway Study Group's 1966 specifications and became known as Proto:87. Early adoption was concentrated in Britain, France and Germany. In the early 1990s, modelers in the Netherlands produced HO/Proto:87 kits of Dutch prototypes, and Alan Gibson manufactured Dutch-prototype wheels to Proto:87 standards that served as a de facto standard through much of that decade.

=== North American development ===
The NMRA Proto:87 Special Interest Group (SIG) was formed in 1994 to study true-scale wheel and track standards for HO scale. The SIG published the Proto:87 Journal as an online magazine, and by 2005 its community numbered more than 400 modelers. In the late 1990s, NorthWest Short Line began producing Proto:87 wheelsets based on an American wheel profile.

Between the late 1990s and 2004, the NMRA developed formal "Proto" and "Fine" scale standards (the Sx.1 series), derived by directly scaling Association of American Railroads and American Railway Engineering Association prototype specifications. The reorganized standards were adopted in 2004. The resulting HO dimensions differed from the original 1966 British specifications by no more than about 0.001–0.002 in. in a few non-critical categories, so track and wheels built to either specification remained interchangeable.

== Standards and characteristics ==
Proto:87 retains the 1:87.1 scale and 16.5 mm track gauge of conventional HO scale but specifies wheel and track dimensions far closer to prototype practice, codified in the NMRA's Proto specifications S-3.1 (wheels) and S-4.1 (track). Nominal values include a track gauge of 16.48 mm, a flangeway width of 0.56 mm, a wheel width of 1.63 mm, a flange width of 0.31 mm and a flange depth of 0.32 mm—markedly finer than the NMRA RP25/110 wheel profile in common use.

Because the wheel and track standards are interdependent, equipment fitted with Proto:87 wheels must run on track built to matching standards: trains using NMRA RP25 "universal" wheels cannot operate reliably on Proto:87 trackwork, and Proto:87 equipment cannot run on conventional HO track. The system also requires a larger minimum radius than traditional trackwork, and reliable operation depends closely on maintaining a consistent wheel check gauge so that wheel flanges clear the crossing nose at turnouts.

The degree to which the adopted NMRA dimensions remain compatible with parts built to the original specifications has been disputed; some finescale practitioners hold that the NMRA's rounding of dimensions produced a separate, less compatible standard, and continue to support only the original figures.

== The Proto:87 Stores ==
The Proto:87 Stores was a United States mail-order business established in 1996 by Andy Reichert, an early member of the SIG who served as its volunteer storekeeper. Operating separately from the SIG, it supplied finescale components including NorthWest Short Line Proto:87 wheelsets, etched frog (crossing) kits as drop-in replacements for commercial turnouts, and a hand-laid track system using cast tie plates with integral spike-head detail to gauge and hold the rail without printed-circuit-board ties or soldering. Many of its components could also be used by conventional HO modellers for finer detail. As of 2025 the store had ceased accepting orders.

Similarly, the Proto:48 group is dedicated to finescale modeling in O scale.

== See also ==
- Rail transport modelling scales
- Model railway scales
- HO scale
