= OO =

OO, O_O or variants may refer to:

== Arts and entertainment ==
- OO (EP), by Zion.T, 2017
- "O.O" (song), by Nmixx, 2022
- The Ice Warriors, a 1967 Doctor Who serial (production code OO)

== Language ==
- <oo>, a Latin-script digraph
- Ꝏ, a ligature of the Latin script

== People ==
- Oo Zun (1868–1944), Burmese social worker and Buddhist nun
- Tin Oo (1927–2024), Burmese politician, activist and military

== Places ==
- Oô, France
- Oo, Indonesia
- Old Oak Common TMD, England, carriage shed depot code OO
- Belgium (aircraft registration prefix OO)

== Other uses ==
- ʻŌʻō, an extinct bird of the genus Moho
- ʻOʻo stick, a traditional Hawaiian digging bar
- OO gauge, a model railway standard
- Official Observer, an appointed amateur radio operator
- Several emoticons
- Oriental Orthodoxy, a Christian denomination
- Original Oratory, a competitive event in high school forensic competitions
- SkyWest Airlines, IATA airline code OO

== See also ==
- Double O (disambiguation)
- 00 (disambiguation)
- 0-0 (disambiguation)
- O0 (disambiguation)
- OOO (disambiguation)
- $\infty$, infinity symbol
- ᅇ, an obsolete unit of the Hangul alphabet
- ⚭, marriage symbol
- ⱺ, a phonetic character
- Object-oriented programming, a computer programming paradigm
- Orange Order, a protestant fraternal order in Northern Ireland
- $0^0$, mathematical notation for zero to the power of zero
