= Zero Zero =

Zero Zero may refer to:

== Music ==
- "Zero Zero", a song by Gerard Way from the 2014 album Hesitant Alien
- "Zero Zero", a 1981 theatrical musical production and album by Mike Batt
- "Zero Zero", an instrumental by Texas from the 1999 album The Hush

== Other uses ==
- Zero-zero ejection seat, for aircraft
- Zero-zero, the starting score for a game of singles pickleball
- Zero Zero, a comics anthology published by Fantagraphics from 1995 to 2000

== See also ==
- 00 (disambiguation)
