= Zero-order process (statistics) =

In probability theory and statistics, a zero-order process is a stochastic process in which each observation is independent of all previous observations. For example, a zero-order process in marketing would be one in which the brands purchased next do not depend on the brands purchased before, implying a fixed probability of purchase since it is zero order in regards to probability.
