= Double O =

Double O may refer to:

- Double O (Cyrillic) ⟨Ꚙ ꚙ⟩, a letter of the Cyrillic script
- Double O (ligature) ⟨Ꝏ ꝏ⟩, an obsolete ligature used for the Massachusett language
- Double O (charity), operated by Pete Townshend of The Who
- Double-O, Michael Aguilar, American music producer
- 00 Agent, a fictional type of secret agent in the James Bond franchise
- Double-O Ranch Historic District
