= EM gauge =

EM
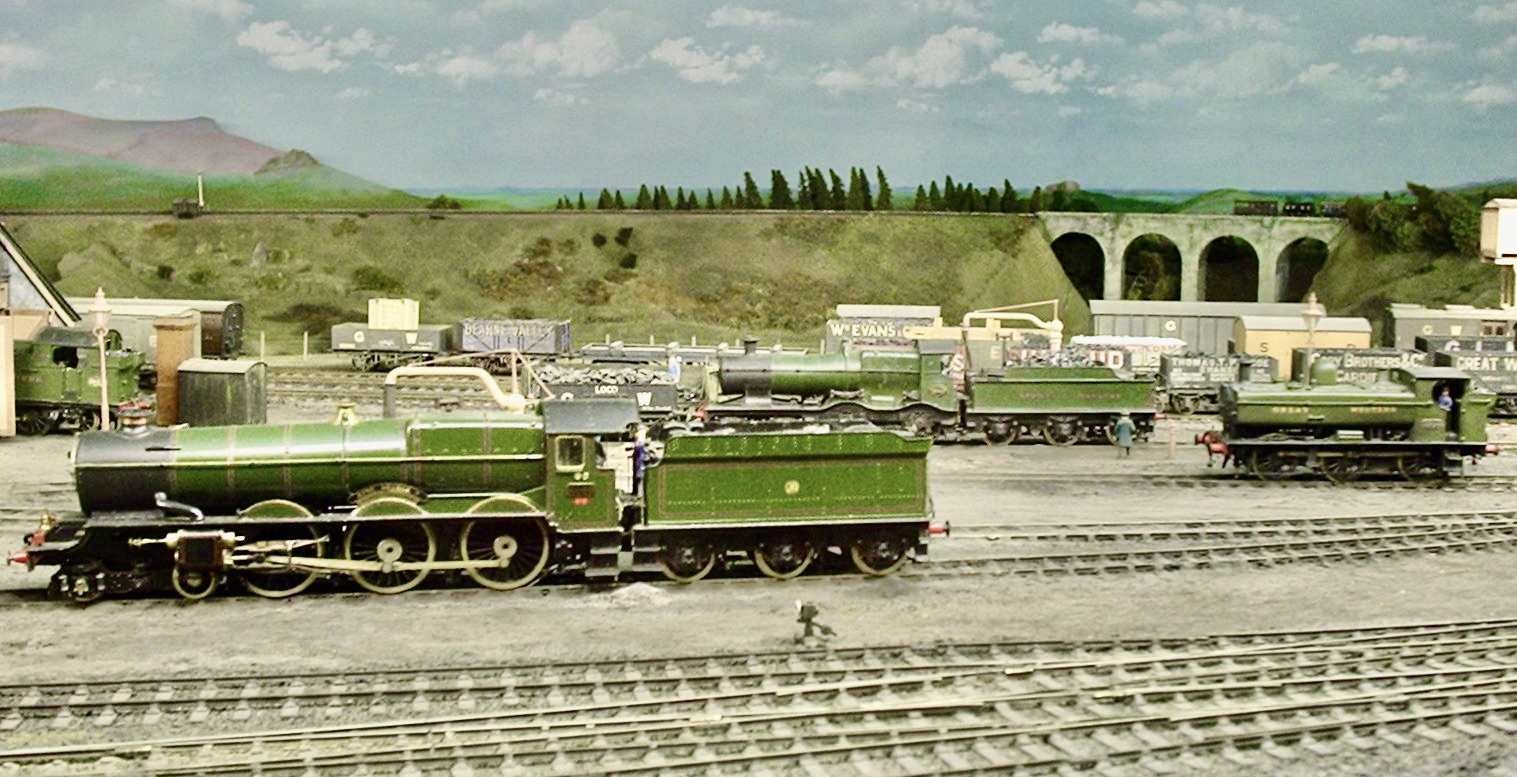
- EM gauge locomotives by Guy Williams, at Pendon
- Scale: 4 mm to 1 ft (305 mm)
- Scale ratio: 1:76
- Prototype gauge: Standard gauge

EM gauge (named after the track gauge of a nominal Eighteen Millimetres) is a variant of 4 mm to a foot (1:76) scale used in model railways.

EM was developed because OO gauge, favoured by manufacturers of British prototype models, utilised track that was too narrow. OO was developed in the UK in the 1930s as a response to manufacturers finding they were unable to fit the motors of the time into British prototype small boilered locomotives when scaled at the globally popular HO scale's 3.5 mm to a foot (1:87). As the scale was increased to 4 mm to the foot to make the locomotives larger, the track gauge was left at 16.5 mm (0.65 in), and hence is too narrow (by a scale 178 mm or 7 in) to correctly depict the prototype's track gauge of 4 ft 8 1/2 in (1,435 mm).

EM gauge was founded in the 1950s, originally with 18 mm (0.709 in) gauge track and rolling stock wheelsets based upon the crude and massively out-of-scale products of the contemporary OO model manufacturers.

18 mm gauge was still undersize by almost a millimetre. With the limitations of modelling at this time, particularly the width of tyres, the largest gauge that could fit within the outline of a scale model would be 18.5 mm, no larger. This was mostly an issue for steam locomotives, where the popular technique at the time of making connecting and coupling rods from rail required an excessive spacing between wheel faces and the cylinders.

Attempts to make finer tyre and flange standards were thwarted initially by the overscale rail sections available commercially, it being impractical for an individual modeller to make smaller rails – although some did attempt to, by cutting down commercial rail. Smaller flange and tyre dimensions were also unsuccessful, as the narrow tyres tended to detach from the wheel centres. More critically, small flanges required comparably smaller rail, trackwork gaps and point frogs in order to work reliably.

Wheelset standards did become more fine in time, allowing EM to evolve into 18.2 mm (0.717 in) gauge track (for a while called EEM gauge until it was adopted into the mainstream standard). Some modellers were still not happy with this, it is still a scale 1.9 inches (48.26 mm) too narrow, and developed the P4 standards (18.83 mm or 0.741 in gauge).

Most EM modellers will have started off using OO gauge and having acquired the necessary modelling skills, then advanced into EM. Modellers in EM typically re-wheel their rolling stock and hand-build their trackwork, although pre-built track is available from specialist suppliers. There are also many 4 mm scale kits which can be used by all 4 mm scale gauges, and since the advanced skills, advanced kit building and scratchbuilding are also common.

EM standards are set by the EM Gauge Society, defining gauge and wheel dimensions to ensure compatibility across layouts.

== See also ==
- Pendon Museum
- Rail transport modelling scales
