= N scale =

Modelling scale of 1:160, 1:150 (Japan), 1:148 (UK)

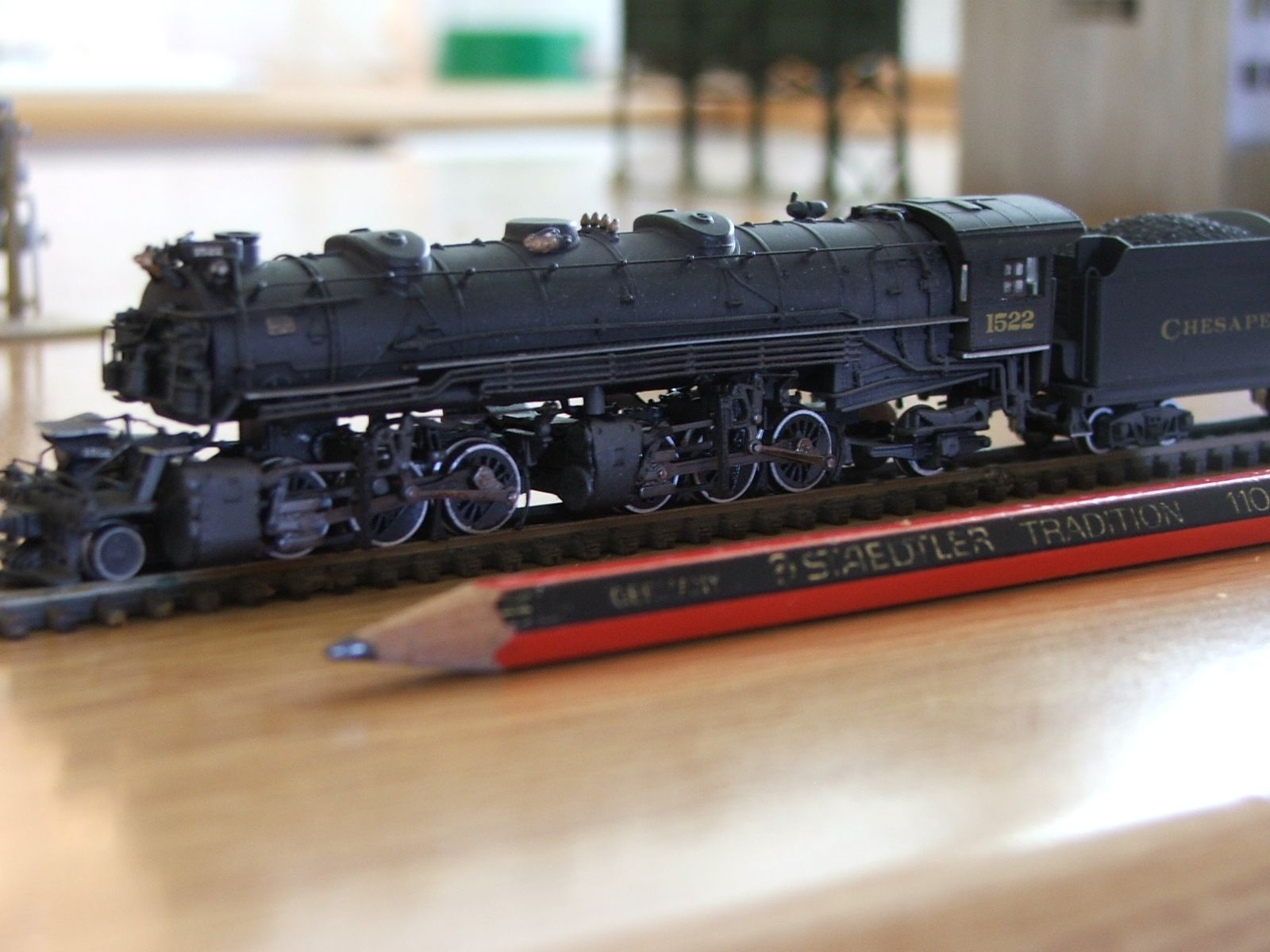
- A Bachmann Industries N-scale model of a Chesapeake and Ohio Railway H-5 class 2-6-6-2 Mallet locomotive, shown alongside a pencil for size
- Scale ratio: 1:148 (United Kingdom); 1:150 (Japan); 1:160 (elsewhere)
- Model gauge: 9 mm (0.354 in)
- Prototype gauge: Standard gauge

N scale is a popular model railway scale. Depending upon the manufacturer (or country), the scale ranges from 1:148 to 1:160. Effectively the scale is 1:159, 9 mm to 1,435 mm (4 ft 8 1/2 in), which is the width of standard-gauge railway. However the scale may vary to simulate wide or narrow-gauge rail. In all cases, the gauge (the distance between the rails) is 9 mm or 0.354 in. The term N gauge refers to the track dimensions, but in the United Kingdom in particular British N gauge refers to a 1:148 scale with 1:160 (9 mm or 0.354 in) track gauge modelling. The terms N scale and N gauge are often inaccurately used interchangeably, as scale is defined as ratio or proportion of the model, and gauge only as a distance between rails. The scale 1:148 defines the rail-to-rail gauge equal to 9 mm exactly (at the cost of scale exactness), so when calculating the rail or track use 1:160 and for engines and car wheel base use 1:148.

All rails are spaced 9 mm apart but the height can differ. Rail height (in thousandths of an inch) is expressed as a "code": thus, Code 55 rails are 0.055 inches (1.4 mm) high while Code 80 rails have a height of 0.080 inches (2.0 mm). Common real railroad rails are at least 6 inches (150 mm) tall and can be taller on some roads, so at true scale the rails would be about 0.040 inches (1.0 mm) high. Many older N-scale models may not run well on Code 55 track as their flanges are often unrealistically large, causing the wheels to bounce along the ties instead of ride along the railhead. Wheelsets with these large flanges are colloquially known as 'pizza cutters' due to a resemblance to the kitchen utensil. (Note: It has been speculated that the term "pizza cutter" may have stemmed from the resemblance of wheels on the Lima model manufacturing company's models because Lima was an Italian company.)

An advantage of N scale is that it allows hobbyists to build layouts that take up less space than HO scale, or put longer track runs into the same amount of space, because the models are smaller (by nearly a half) than they are in HO scale (1:87). While N scale is quite small, it is not the smallest commercially available scale, as Z scale is smaller yet at 1:220 and T scale is 1:450 or 1:480. N scale is considered generally compatible with 1:144 scale for miniature wargaming.

== History ==
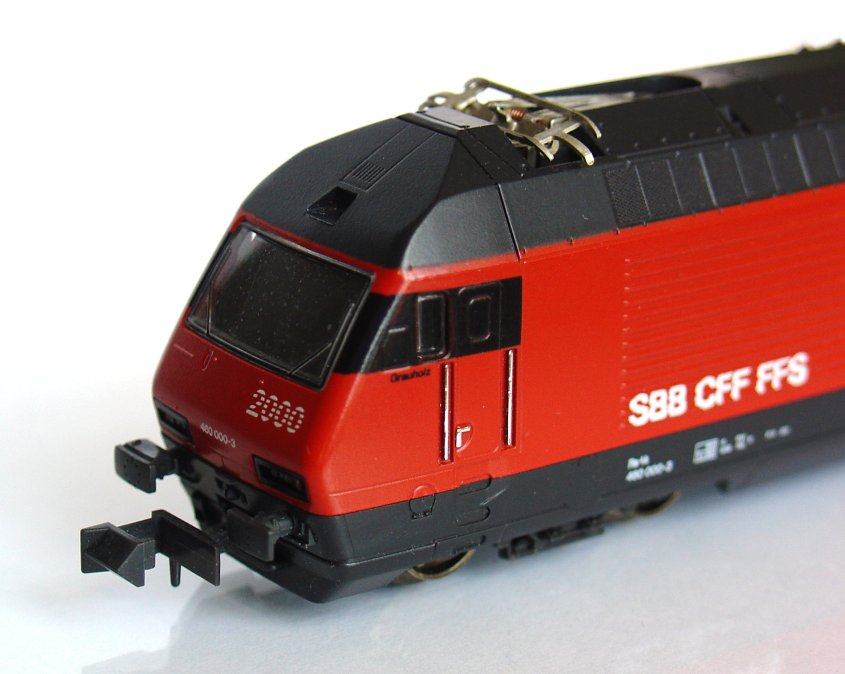
A modern Kato model of SBB Re 460 electric locomotive, with the ubiquitous Arnold "Rapido" coupler

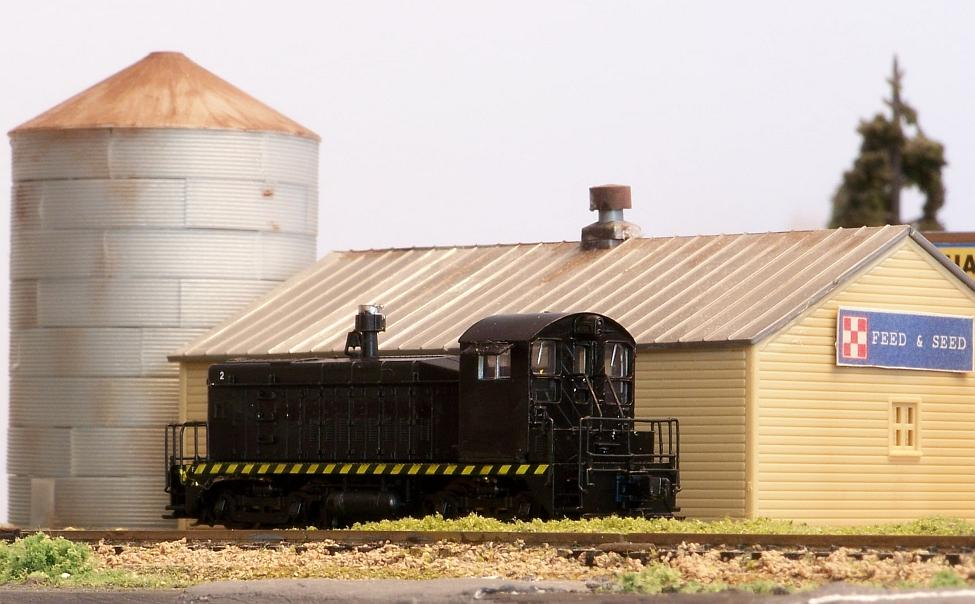
SW-8 switcher

Although trains and accessories of similar gauge or scale existed as early as 1927, modern commercially produced N-scale models were first launched by the Arnold company of Nuremberg in 1962. Unlike other scales and gauges, which were de facto standards at best, within two years N-scale manufacturers defined the gauge and voltage, as well as the height and type of couplers. For example, Arnold developed the now ubiquitous "Rapido" coupler to provide a simple and robust releasable coupler design. Although the original Arnold coupler has been joined by more functional and aesthetically pleasing designs, Arnold allowed use of the Rapido design by other manufacturers, so established a common standard to couple together rolling stock from different sources.

N scale has a large worldwide following. Models are made of very many standard-gauge prototypes from every continent. N scale's popularity is second only to that of HO. In Japan, where space in homes is more limited, N scale is the most popular scale, and HO scale is considered large. Not all modellers select N because they have small spaces; some use N scale to build more complex or more visually expansive models.

N scale in Australia has become more popular over the years. Modellers use mainly US, British, and European prototypes because for a long time, the Australian market had no N-scale models of local prototypes. The creation of local prototypes is now a flourishing "cottage" industry, making Australia N-scale modelling more popular each year.

N-gauge track and components are also used with larger scales, in particular H0e (or "HOe") and 00-9 scale for modelling narrow-gauge railways. N-scale models on Z-scale track are used to model metre gauge (Nn3). A small amount of 2-foot (Nn2) industrial narrow-gauge modelling in N scale using custom track is done, but suppliers of parts are few. Nn18 layouts use T-scale track and mechanisms to represent minimum-gauge railways. N-scale trains and structures are often used on HO or larger layouts to create forced perspective, or the illusion that an object is further away than it actually is.

== Standards ==
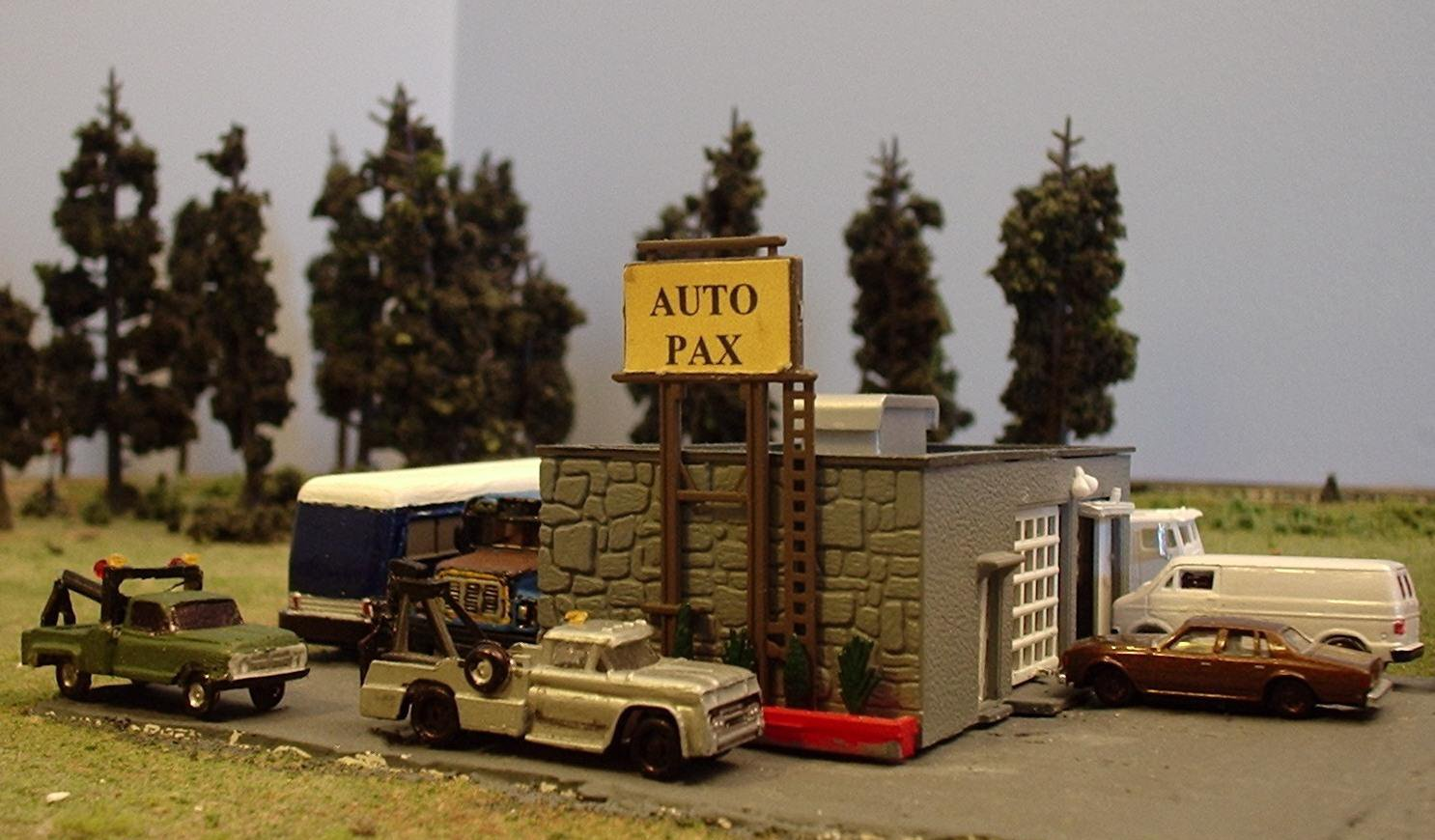
A collection of N scale buildings and scenery

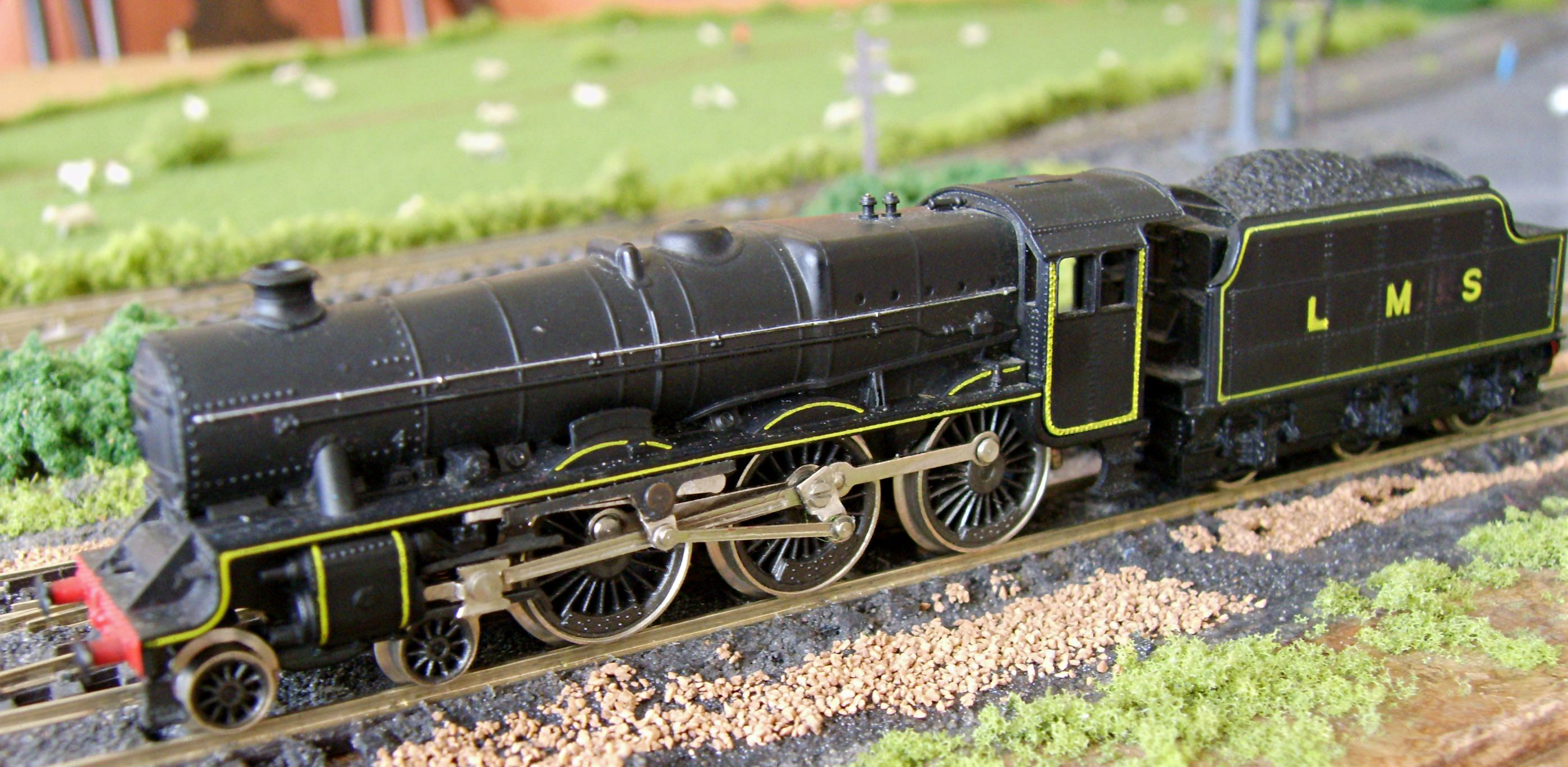
A British model (made by PECO) of an LMS 4-6-0 'Jubilee' steam locomotive

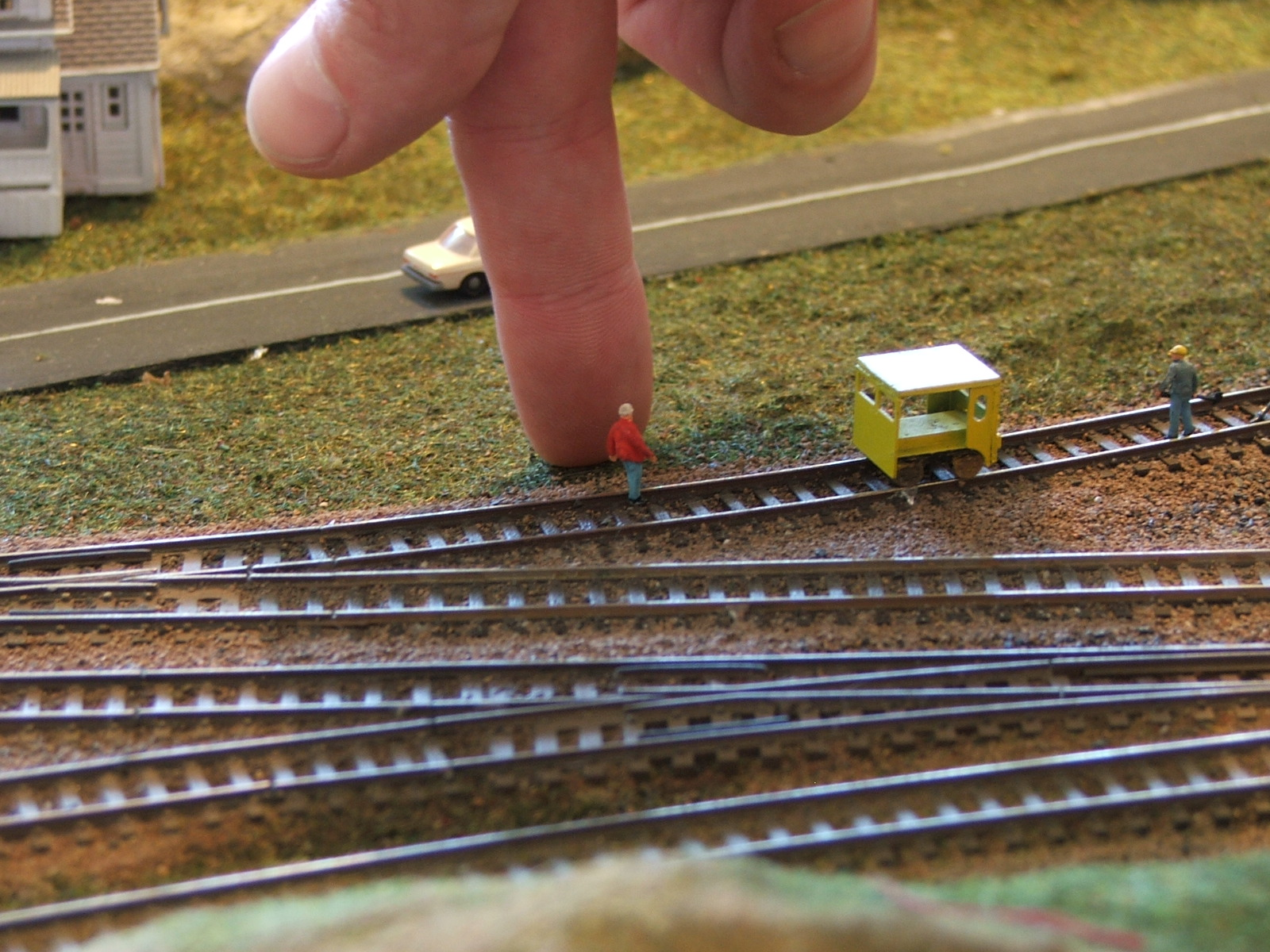
Photo of section of N scale layout with track and a human hand shown for size comparison

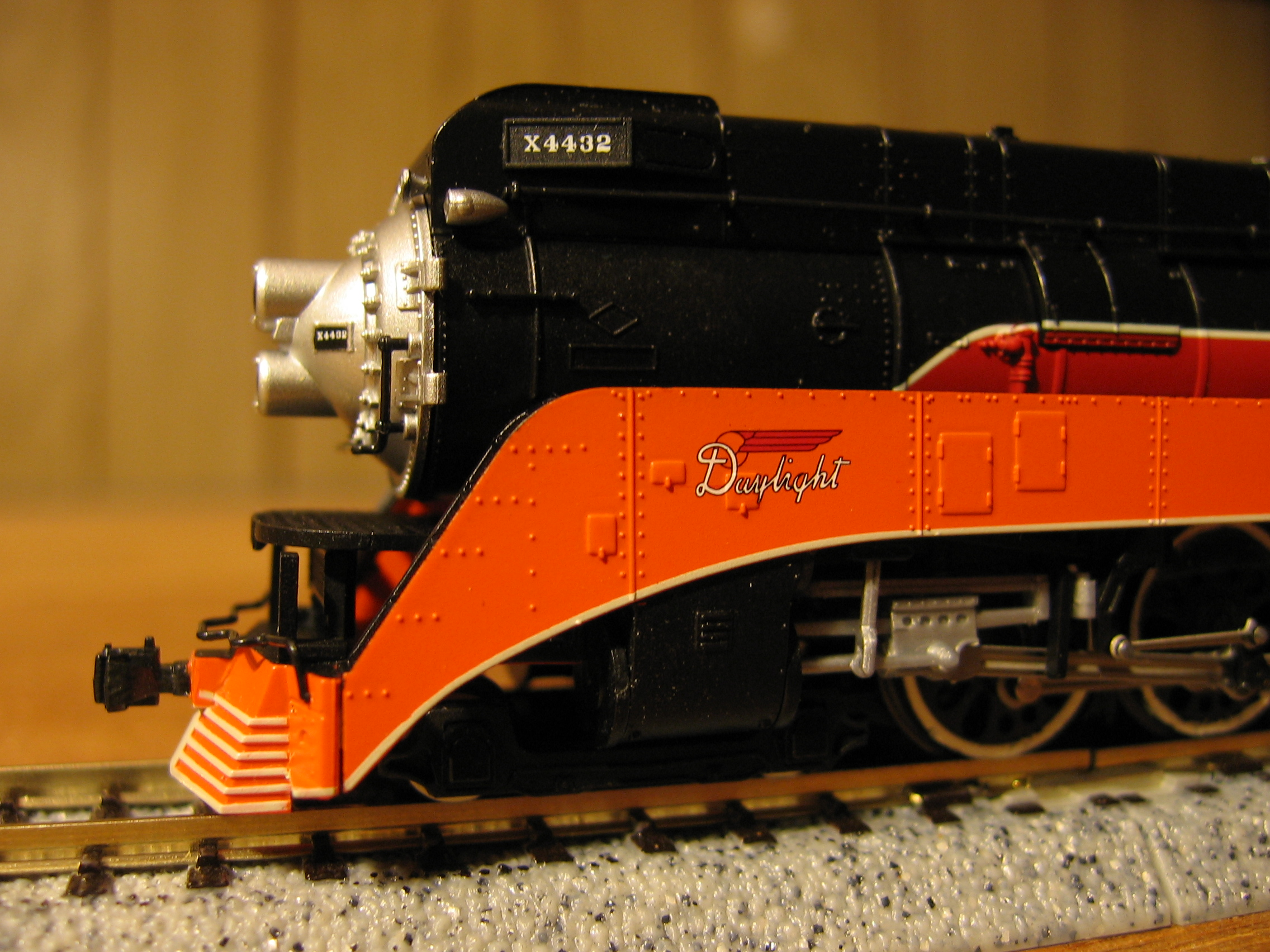
Close-up of N-gauge Southern Pacific GS-4 No. 4432 by Con-cor

Standards useful to both manufacturers and modellers are maintained by MOROP in Europe and the NMRA in North America. These standards are generally the same for such elements as track gauge, scale ratio, couplings, and electrical power, and differ for clearances and other factors that are specific to the prototype being modelled. The wheel and track standards are, however, slightly incompatible and most vendors follow neither standard in part because of this.

N scale locomotives are powered by DC motors which accept a maximum of 12 V DC. In traditional DC control, the speed of the train is determined by the amount of voltage supplied to the rails. The direction of the train is determined by the polarity of the power to the rails. Since the end of the 20th century, an increasing number of enthusiasts have started using digital train control systems to determine the speed and direction of their trains. This has in part been made possible by surface mount technology and new motors that draw very little current (typically 0.2 amps). The most popular digital control systems used in N scale model railways are NMRA-DCC and Selectrix.

The initial agreed-to standard coupling was known as a 'Rapido' coupler from the manufacturer (Arnold); this coupler had been produced under a license from TT-manufacturer Rokal. Most companies developed their own variants of this coupler to avoid Arnold patents on the spring system. Graham Farish initially adopted a plastic flexible U rather than a spring, Peco used a compatible weighted coupler system (Elsie), and Fleischmann cunningly sidestepped the problem by using a sprung plate. All were compatible, though.

The Rapido coupler system works well, but is difficult to use for automatic uncoupling and also relatively large. In the US, Canada, and Australia, it has been largely superseded by a more realistic-looking magnetic knuckle coupler, originally made by Micro-Trains and branded Magne-Matic. The MT couplers (as they are known) are more delicate and closer to scale North American appearance than Rapido couplers. Also, they can be opened by a magnet placed under the track. Other manufacturers, such as Atlas, McHenry and Kato, are now making couplers that mate with Micro Trains couplers.

European modellers have the option to convert the couplings on their rolling stock to the Fleischmann Profi-Coupler system for more reliable operation should they wish to do so, but most N scale rolling stock continues to be manufactured with Rapido couplers - a design which is fairly robust and easy to mold. Modern N scale stock uses a standard NEM socket for couplers which allows different coupling designs to be used by simply pulling out the old coupler and fitting a new one of a different design. In the UK, vendors are increasingly shipping both NEM sockets for couplers and buckeye (knuckle) couplers. It is also very easy to use for coupling and uncoupling.

== Variants ==
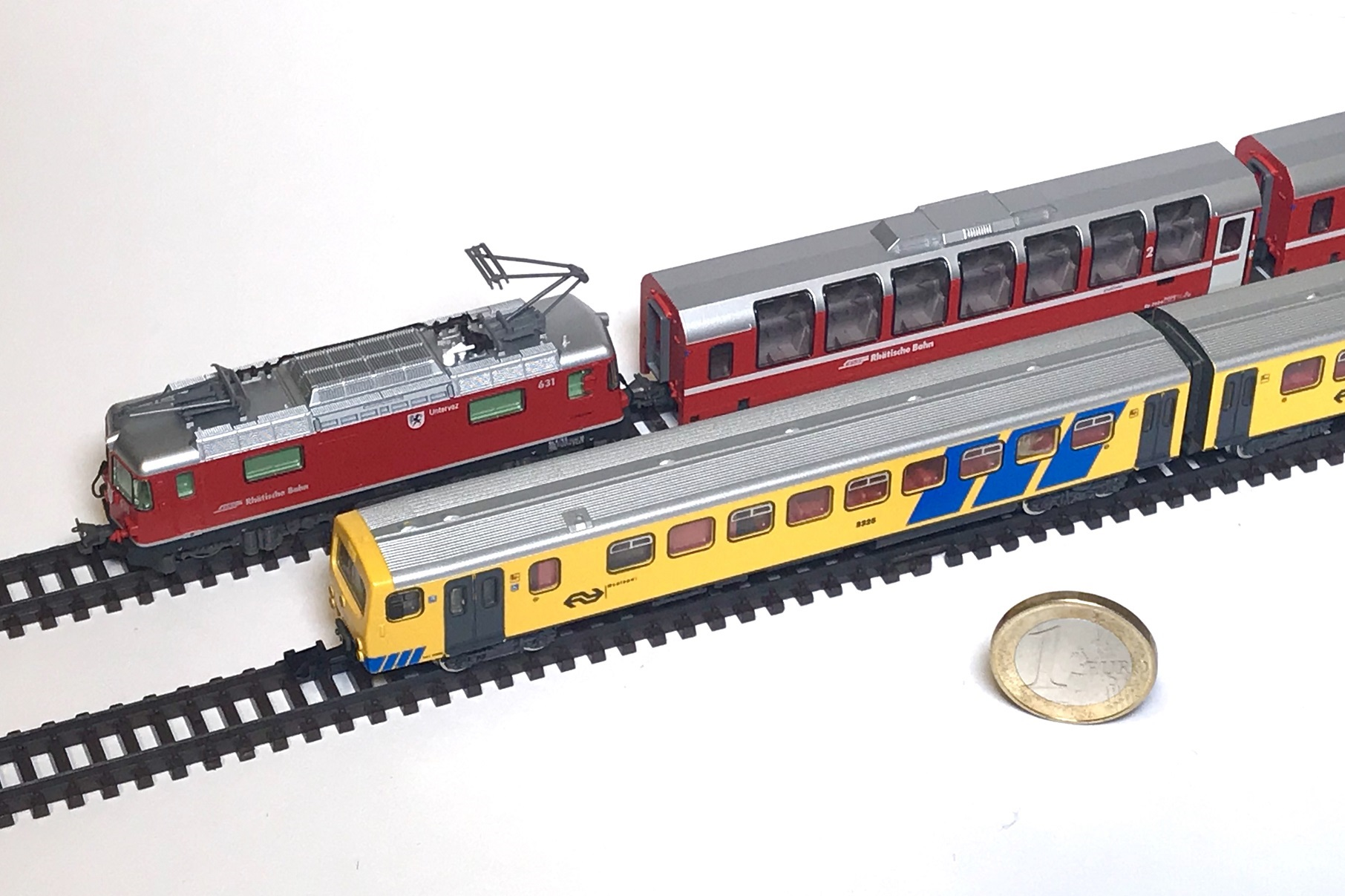
NS DH2 in 1:160 scale (bottom) and Kato Bernina Express in 1:150 scale (top) on 9 mm track gauge. Size comparison with a one-euro coin.

In the United States and Europe, models of standard gauge [1,435 mm (4 ft 8 1/2 in)] trains are built to 1:160 scale and made so that they run on N-gauge track, but in some other countries changes are made. Finescale modellers also use variants of normal N scale.

=== United Kingdom ===
In the United Kingdom, a scale of 1:148 is used for commercially produced models.

In Britain, some N-scale models are built to "2 mm scale" for "2 mm to the foot" which calculates to a 1:152 proportion. Early N scale was also known as "OOO" or "treble-O" in reference to O and OO and was also 1:152, though for an entirely different reason.

=== 2 mm to the foot scale ===
A number of modellers in the United Kingdom use 2 mm scale, a closer-to-scale standard than N scale. 2 mm scale is scaled at 2 mm to the foot (1:152) with a 9.42 mm (0.371 in) track gauge. Nearer to scale appearance is achieved by finer rail, flange, and crossing dimensions than commercial N-gauge (9 mm / 0.354 in) components. A variation of the 2 mm standards is used by the FiNe group for 1:160 scale. It uses the same rail, flange, and crossing dimensions as 2 mm (1:152) standards, but with a track gauge of 0.353 in (8.97 mm), and corresponding reduction in back-to-back. FiNe is dominated by European modellers.

=== OOO scale ===
In 1960, Lone Star introduced some of the first (1:160) N scale models branded as Treble-0-Lectric (OOO) into the United Kingdom. (Note: As an aside on the perennial question of whether British '00' gauges use letters or numbers, Lone Star named their product the 'Treble-0-Lectric' (with a zero) yet described this as gauge 'OOO', with three letters.) The original die-cast metal models were push along and gauged to run on a die-cast trackwork having a gauge that was closer to 8 mm (0.315 in). Coupling was by a simple loop and pin arrangement. The novelty of the "Lone Star Locos" line was such that they even found their way to the United States and were sold in the toys area of major department stores like J.J. Newberry.

Electrified models followed soon after. The track gauge was widened to a nominal 9 mm (0.354 in) and rails were isolated with nonconductive ties (sleepers) for 12-volt DC operation. Gearing between the motor and the axles at such a small scale was done by rubber bands, rather than the usual worm gear. A different coupling based on a shrunken OO-scale coupling was fitted. The OOO couplings and specifications have long since been replaced by commercial N-scale manufacturers.

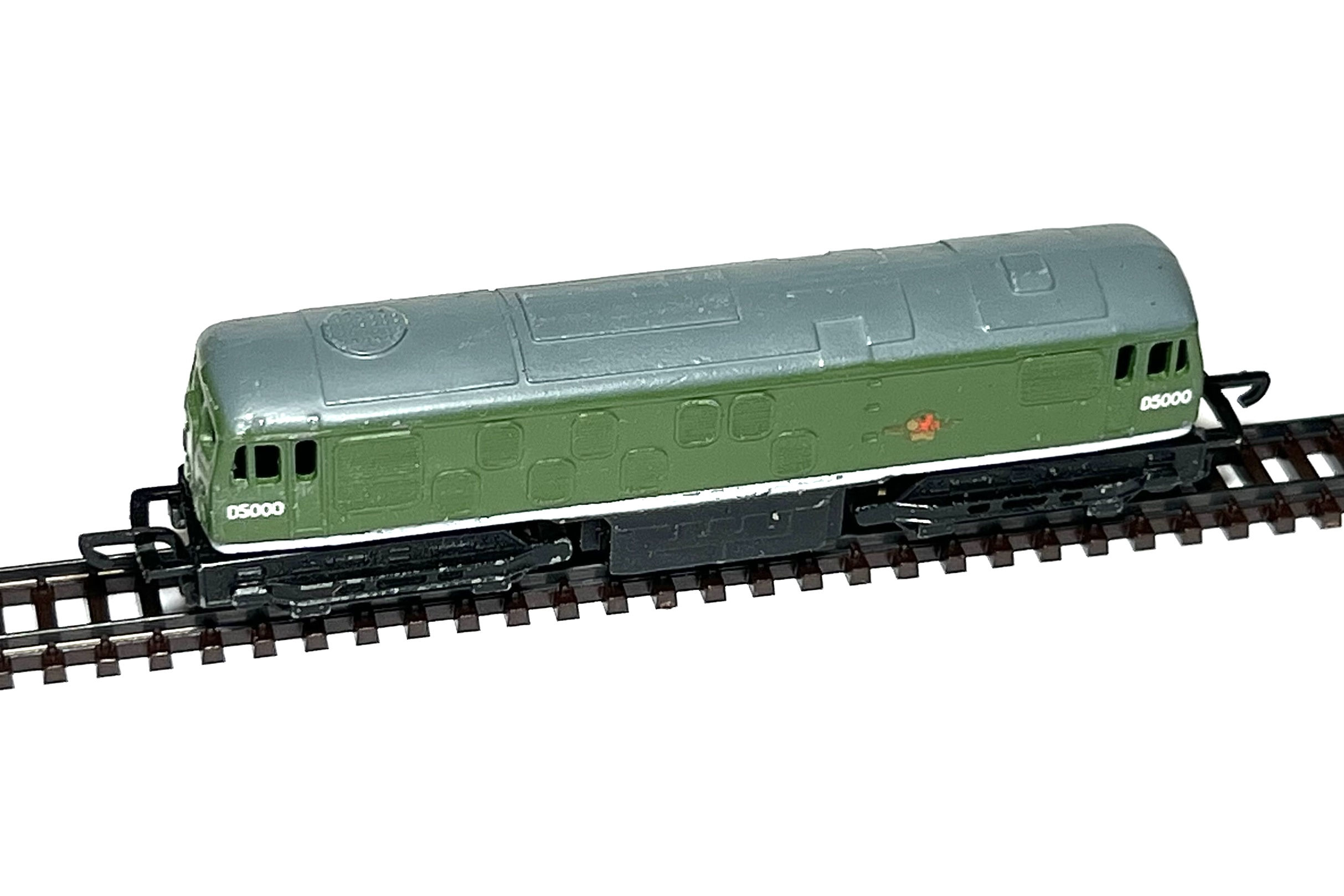
Treble-0-Lectric Derby Sulzer D5000 British Rail Class 24 on Arnold N-gauge track. Exterior view.

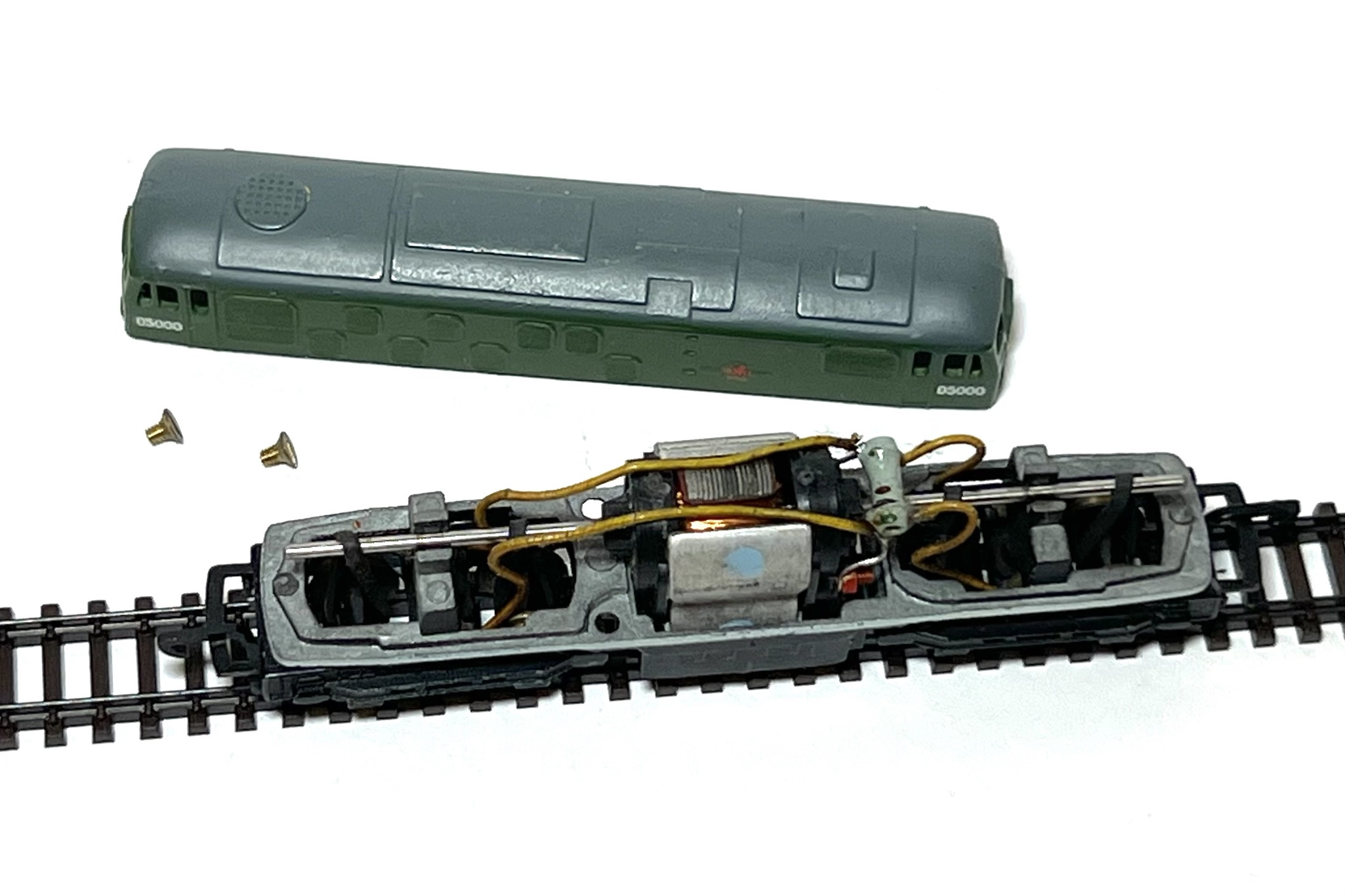
Treble-0-Lectric Derby Sulzer D5000 British Rail Class 24 on Arnold N-gauge track. Interior view, the transmission between the motor and the axles is realised with rubber bands.

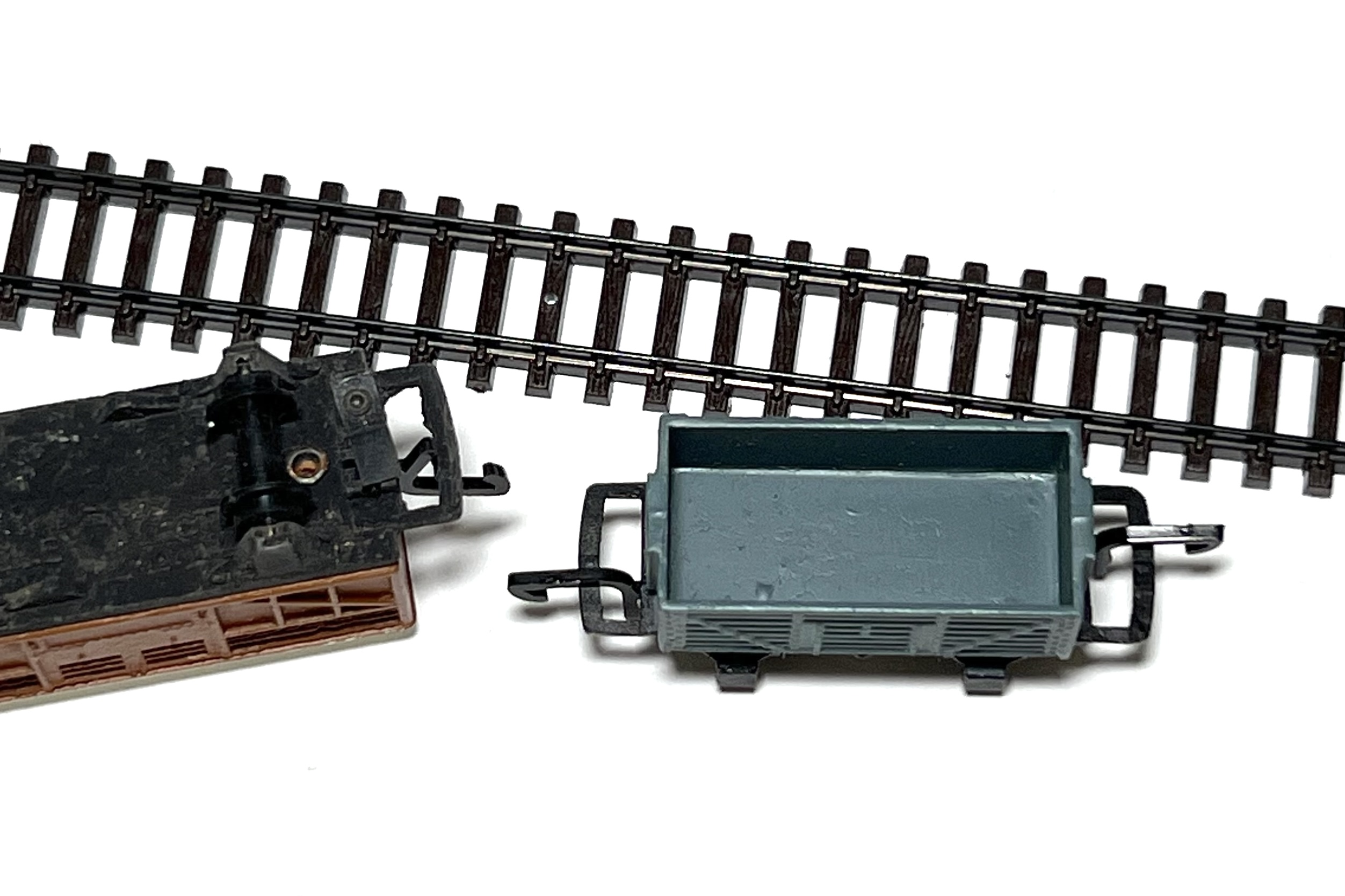
Treble-0-Lectric freight wagon with a miniaturised tension lock coupling beside Arnold N-gauge track

=== Australian N scale ===
Australian railways use several gauges across the states, although in most cases 9 mm-gauge track is used. Some modellers have used Z-gauge track for Nn3 models of Queensland Railways. N scale modelling in Australia has been a cottage-industry affair, with typically small runs of resin-based models being produced. Some etch-brass kits have also been released. In most cases, the kits have been bodies designed to run on mechanisms or bogies available from overseas. Some very fine models are starting to emerge from various Australian manufacturers with many kits now available.

Manufacturers have started to engage Chinese manufacturers to produce high quality wagons and locomotives. The Victorian producer Aust-N-Rail pioneered this approach, while in 2011, BadgerBits released Australia's first ready-to-run N-gauge locomotive, a 48 class retailing for around A$240. A new manufacturer has arrived on the scene (November 2011) with Australia-N Railways using both Australian locally manufactured detail accessories and Chinese factories to produce their locomotives and rolling stock. Other kits continue to be released using the more usual method of resin-based castings and it is now possible obtain models of railways running in most states, although the coverage is highly variable.

=== Japanese N scale ===
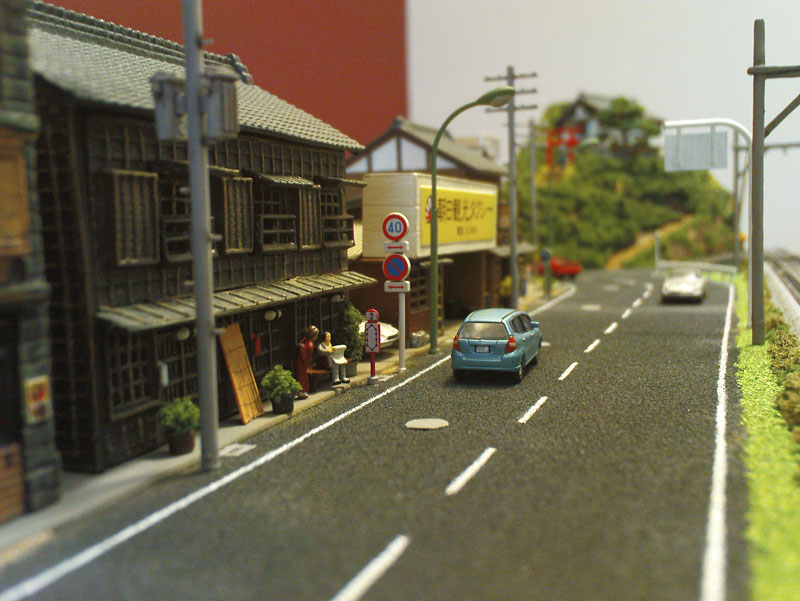
A 1:150-scale model of a Japanese railroad diorama

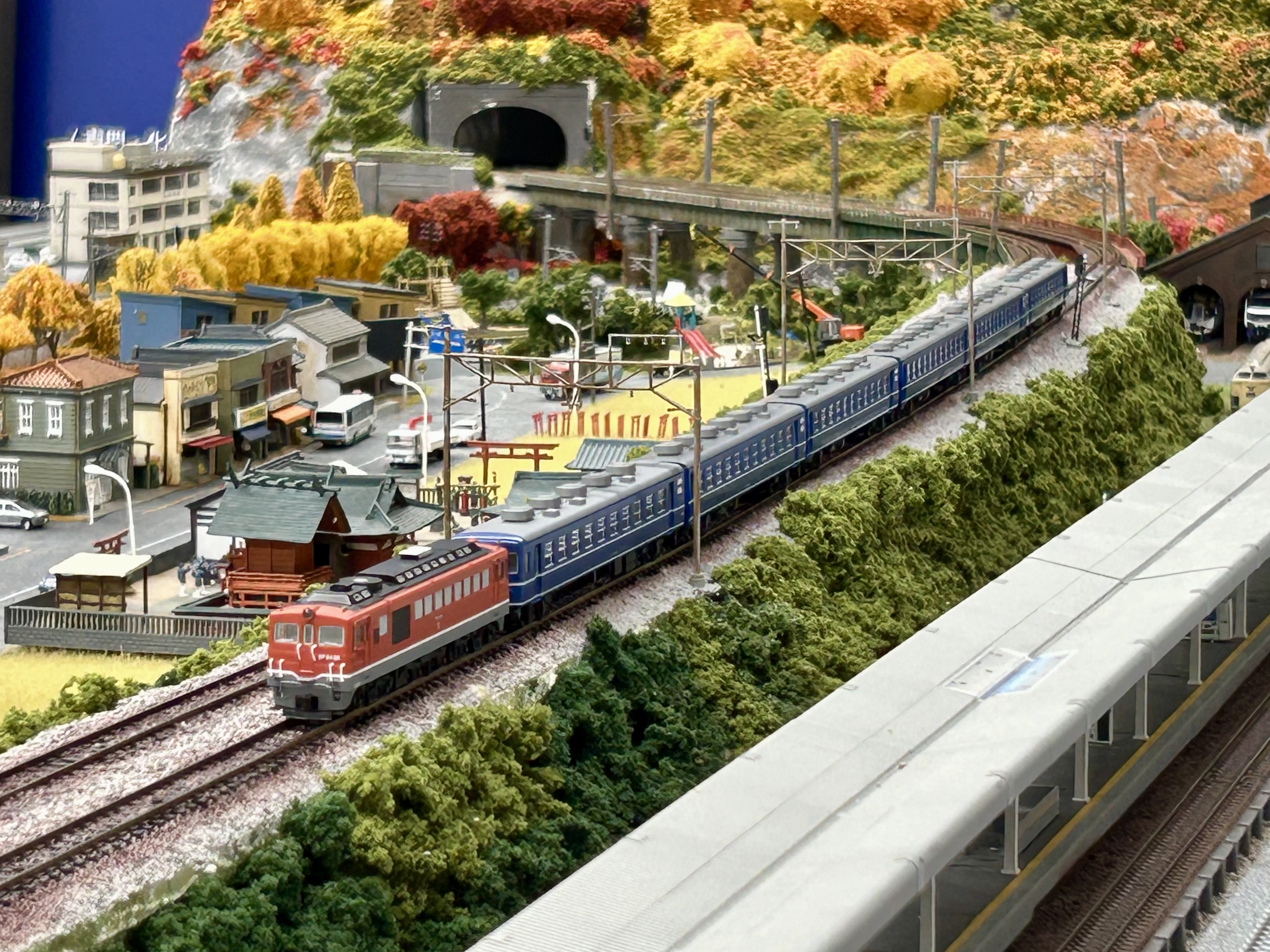
A 1:150-scale model of a JNR Class DF50 diesel locomotive with 12-series passenger cars manufactured by Kato

Since the former Japanese National Railways and other major private railways adopted a track gauge of 1,067 millimetres (3 ft 6.0 in), Japanese N-scale models of conventional railways adopted 1:150 scale with 9 mm-gauge. But, in the case of Shinkansen, which adopted a 1,435-millimetre (4 ft 8.5 in) track gauge, models are scaled down to 1:160. A small number of modelers adopted a model scale of 1:120 using 9 mm-gauge tracks to represent the narrow-gauge railway 3 ft 6 in (1,067 mm)-gauge lines common in Japan. This is a different prototype gauge and scale to standard N scale with the narrower prototype gauge and called TT-9.

== Notable layouts ==
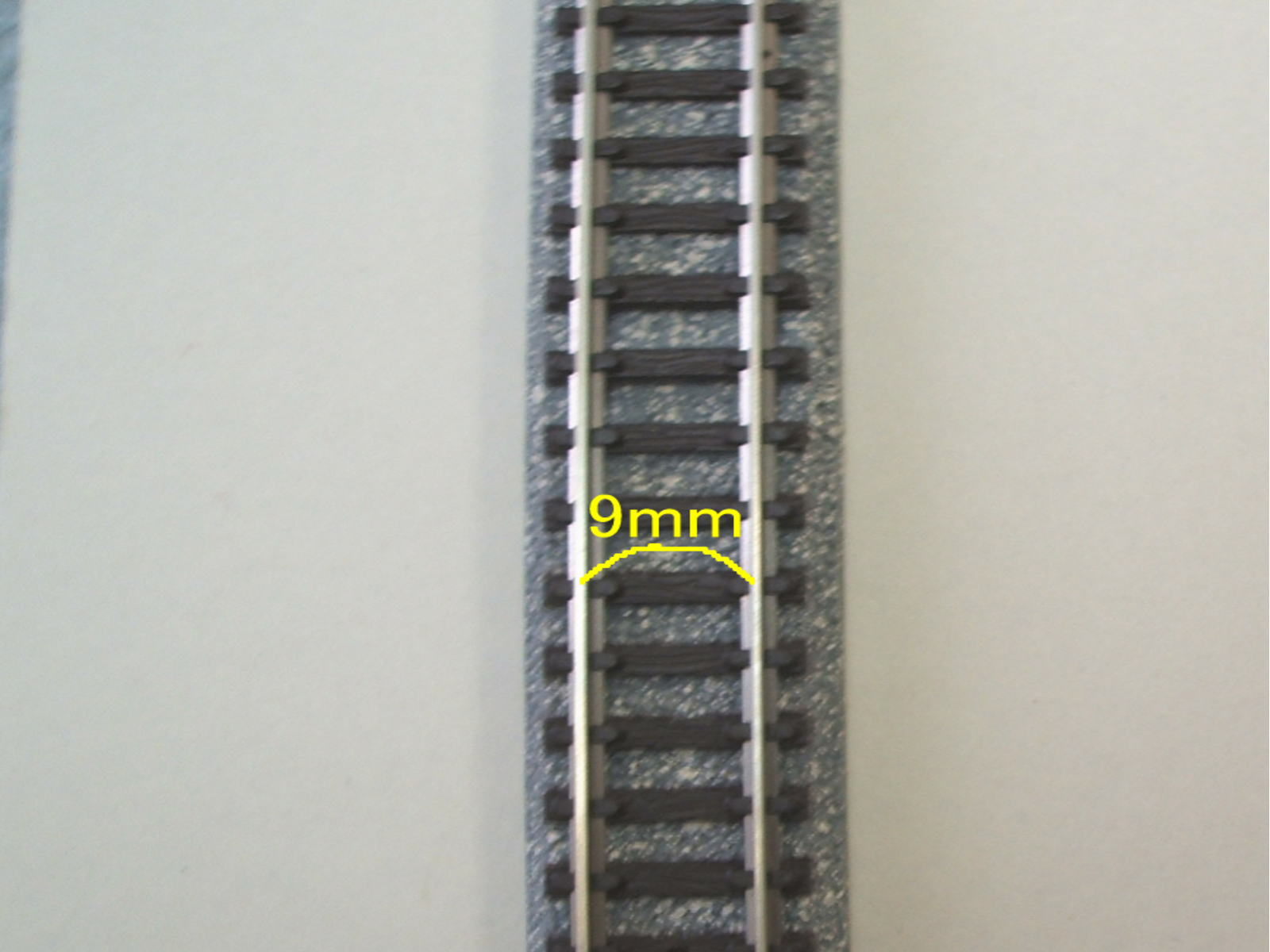
N gauge track

- Wolfgang Frey's "Stuttgart Hbf" layout is a replica of the Stuttgart main railway station started in 1978. The layout features a detailed signalling system. Following Frey's death in 2012, the layout was due to be opened as a public exhibit in 2017.
- The San Diego Model Railroad Museum in California, United States, houses one of the largest N-scale layouts in the world – 1,200 square feet (110 m^{2}) – called the Pacific Desert Lines. It has about 33 scale miles (53 km) of mainline track, over 500 hand-made turnouts and models of several local landmarks, including the Carrizo Gorge's Goat Canyon Trestle.

== See also ==
- Rail transport modelling scales
- NTrak
- oNeTrak
