= OO gauge =

Model railroad gauge

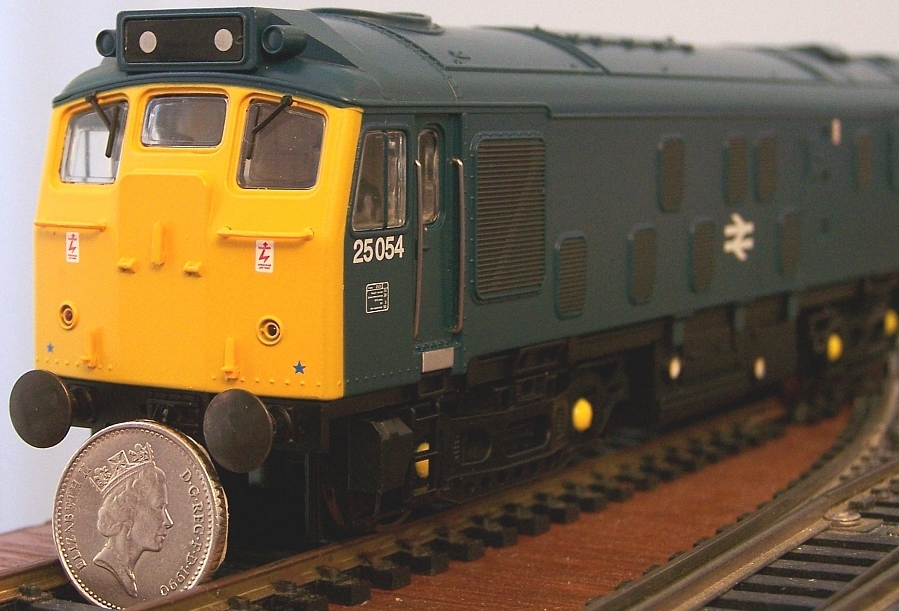
- UK prototype model of a OO scale (1:76) British Rail Class 25 shown with an 18.0 millimetres (0.71 inches) diameter five pence coin
- Scale: 4 mm to 1 ft
- Scale ratio: 1:76.2
- Model gauge: 16.5 mm (0.65 in)
- Prototype gauge: Standard gauge

OO gauge or OO scale (also, 00 gauge and 00 scale) is the most popular standard gauge model railway standard in the United Kingdom, outside of which it is virtually unknown. OO gauge is one of several 4 mm-scale standards (4 mm to 1 ft (304.8 mm), or 1:76.2), and the only one to be marketed by major manufacturers. The OO track gauge of 16.5 mm (0.65 in) – the same as the 1:87 HO scale – corresponds to prototypical gauge of 4 ft 1 1/2 in, rather than 4 ft 8 1/2 in standard gauge. However, since the 1960s, other gauges in the same scale have arisen – 18.2 mm (EM) and 18.83 mm (Scalefour) — to reflect the desire of some modellers for greater scale accuracy.

== Origin ==
"Scale" and "gauge"

Scale is the ratio or proportion of the model to the prototype. Gauge is the distance between the rails. The terms are not interchangeable.

Double-0 scale model railways were launched by Bing in 1921 as "The Table Railway", running on 16.5 mm (0.65 in) track and scaled at 4 mm to the foot. In 1922, the first models of British prototypes appeared. Initially all locomotives were powered by clockwork, but the first electric power appeared in 1923.

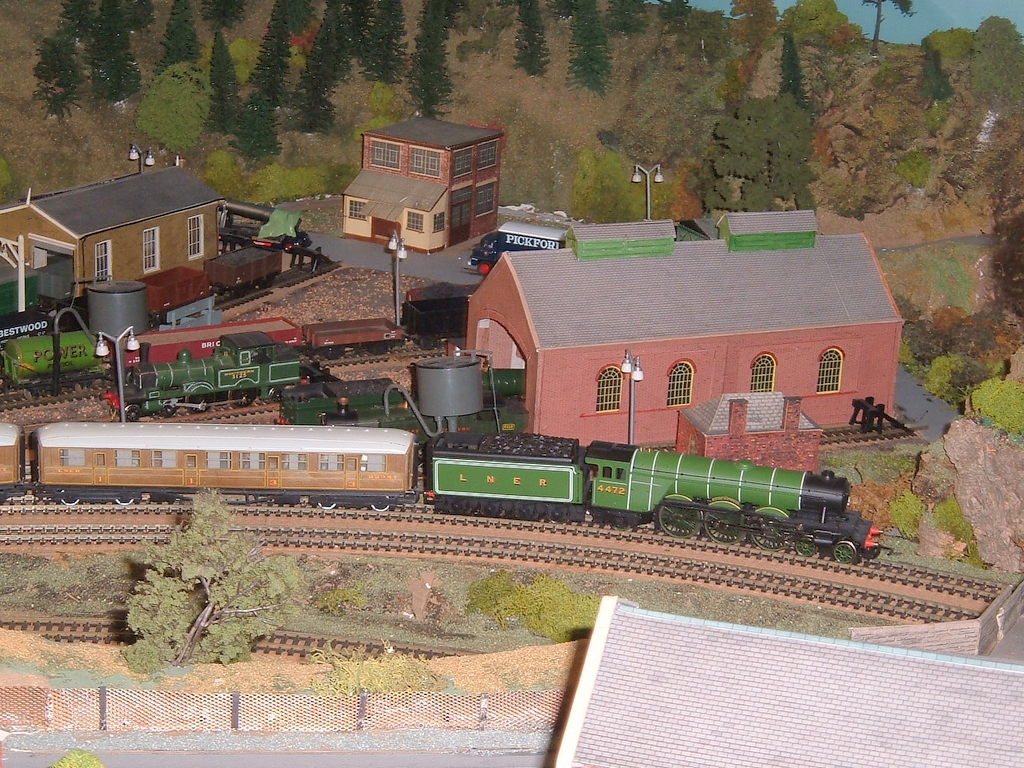
Hornby Railways Flying Scotsman locomotive on an OO gauge layout

"OO" describes models with a scale of 4 mm = 1 foot (1:76) running on HO scale 1:87 (3.5 mm = 1 foot) track (16.5 mm/0.650 in). This combination came about since early clockwork mechanisms and electric motors were difficult to fit within HO scale models of British trains, which have a smaller loading gauge than their European and North American counterparts. A solution was to enlarge the scale of the model to 4 mm to the foot but keep the 3.5 mm to the foot gauge track. This also allowed more space to model the external valve gear. The resulting HO track gauge of 16.5 mm represents 4 feet 1.5 inches at 4 mm to the foot scale, which is 7 inches too narrow or approximately 2.33 mm too narrow in the model.

In 1932, the Bing company collapsed, but the Table Railway continued to be manufactured by the new Trix company. Trix decided to use the new HO standard, being half of French 0 gauge (1:43.5 scale). However, European 0 scale is 1:45.

In 1938, the Meccano Company launched a new range of OO models under the trade name of Hornby Dublo. The combination of 4 mm scale and 16.5 mm gauge has remained the UK's most popular scale and gauge ever since.

In the United States, Lionel Corporation introduced a range of OO models in 1938. Soon other companies followed but it did not prove popular and remained on the market only until 1942, when Lionel train production was shut down due to wartime restrictions to the use of steel. OO gauge was quickly eclipsed by the better-proportioned HO scale. The Lionel range of OO used 19 mm (3/4 inch) track gauge, equating to 57 inches or 4 ft 9 in – very close to the 4 ft 8 1/2 in of standard gauge. There is a small following of American OO scale today.

== OO today ==
OO remains the most popular scale for railway modelling in Great Britain due to a ready availability of ready-to-run stock and starter sets. Ready-to-run in the UK is dominated by Hornby Railways and Bachmann Branchline. Other sources of ready-to-run rolling stock or locomotives include Dapol, Heljan, Peco, ViTrains, Rapido Trains UK, Accurascale, and previously Lima, Tri-ang Railways, and Mainline Railways. Other scales, with the possible exception of N, lack the variety and affordability of UK ready-to-run products.

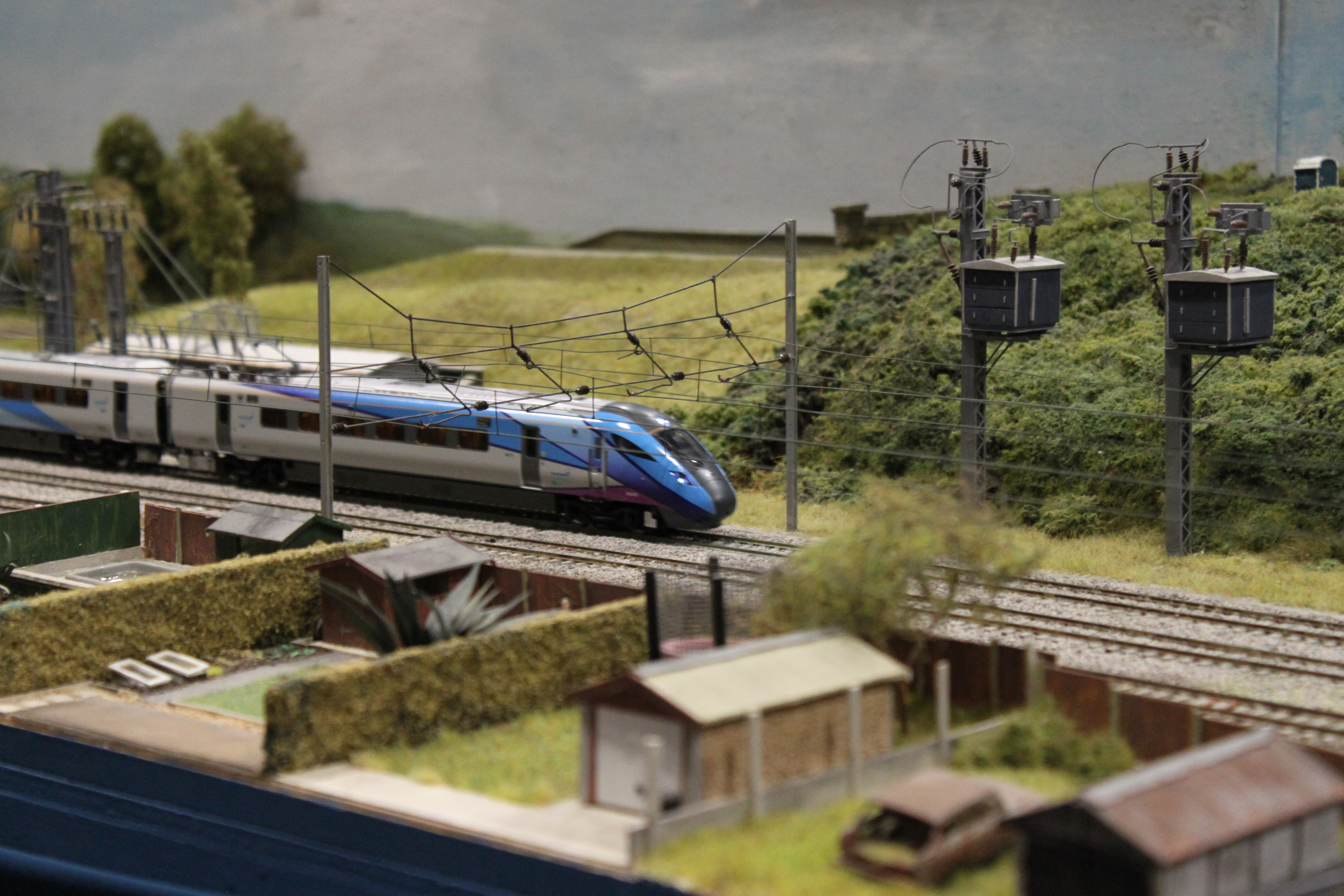
Class 800 Euston Road 00 gauge model Railway at the NEC

== Scaling and accuracy ==
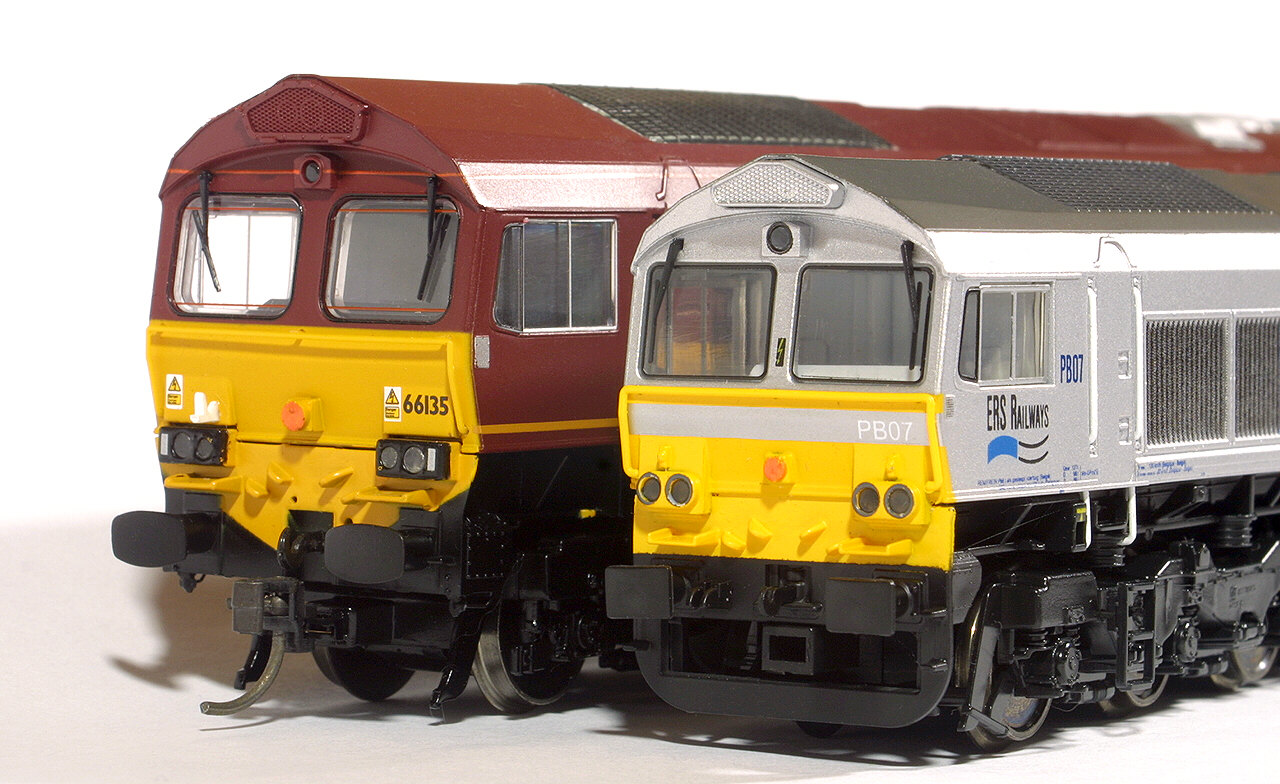
OO scale (left) and HO scale (right) models of the EMD Class 66, showing the size difference.

OO scale permits a level of detail including weathering and individual numbering.

16.5 mm (0.65 in) gauge at 4 mm:1 foot means that the scale gauge represents 4 ft 1 1/2 in (1,257 mm), 7 inches (178 mm) narrower than the prototype 4 ft 8 1/2 in (1,435 mm). This difference is particularly noticeable when looking along the track. As the market for proprietary track is mostly for HO scale, sleeper size and spacing are designed for HO and are therefore underscale.

OO is also used to represent the 5 ft 3 in (1,600 mm) Irish gauge, where it is a scale 13 1/2 inches (343 mm) too narrow.

Though they run on the same track, OO gauge and HO gauge models of the same prototype do not sit well together since the OO models are larger than the HO equivalent.

These differences have led to the development of the finescale standards of EM gauge and P4 standards. Nevertheless, it is possible to model using OO to standards that fall just short of finescale.

In common with most practical model railways of any scale (and not related to the OO gauge inaccuracy) the following compromises are made: Curves are often sharper than the prototype, and often not transitioned, particularly when using "set-track" systems (radius 1 = 371 mm, 2 = 438 mm, 3 = 505 mm, 4 = 571.5 mm). Overhang from long vehicles means that the normal separation between track centres are overscale to prevent collisions on curves between stock on adjacent lines, at up to 65 mm (for set-track (reduced down to 50 mm for Peco Streamline)). Overscale wheel width and deep wheel flanges are used on typical models (but particularly older models), and these require overscale rail profile and much larger clearances on pointwork than is prototypical. Pointwork is often compressed in length to save space.

== 4 mm finescale standards ==
Many experienced modellers find the OO standard produces a "narrow gauge" appearance when the model is viewed head on. Greater accuracy is possible using either EM gauge or the closer-to-exact scale P4 track.

Whilst flextrack is available for both EM and P4 gauges (from manufacturers such as C&L Finescale, SMP and The P4 Track Company), ready-to-run (RTR) point and crossing (P&C) work is not available, so this trackwork must be constructed by the modeller, although RTR turnouts in EM gauge manufactured by Peco are now available from the EM Gauge Society. Kits for doing this are also available from the aforementioned sources amongst others. Several of these kits are also available to the OO modeller who aims for more realistic track since most RTR track is actually scaled to HO and does not represent any British prototype, and the sleeper spacing is too close for scale. EM gauge has slightly overscale flanges and flangeways on point and crossing work; P4 is closer to scale but the smaller flanges and flangeways on P&C work expose poor track construction.

== See also ==
=== Other model railway scales ===
- Rail transport modelling scales

=== Related gauges ===
- OO9 – Used for modelling 2 ft (610 mm) narrow gauge railways in 4 mm scale, often paired with OO scale layouts.
- OOn3 – Used for ms in 4 mm scale
- HO – 3.5 mm scale using the same 16.5 mm (0.65 in) gauge track as OO.
- EM – 4 mm scale using 18.2 mm (0.717 in) track.
- P4 – A set of standards using 18.83 mm (0.741 in) gauge track (accurate scale standard gauge track).
- 00-SF – Uses 16.2 mm (0.638 in) track with ordinary OO wheelsets. Allows the tighter trackwork tolerances of EM without the need to re-gauge wheels.
- American OO gauge – OO scale with 19 mm (¾ in) gauge track.

=== Manufacturers ===
- Accurascale – A relatively new manufacturer founded in 2015 producing UK and Irish locomotives and rolling stock.
- Airfix – Bought the Kitmaster range and sold it under the Airfix brand until the original Airfix company collapsed in 1981. Some of the tooling was then destroyed, but Dapol bought the remainder. Most Airfix military vehicles are also to 1:76 scale.
- Bachmann Branchline – One of the largest manufacturers of ready-to-run OO.
- Dapol – Produce kits (using the Kitmaster toolings bought from Airfix) and ready-to-run locomotives and rolling stock.
- Hattons Model Railways – A former model railway retailer that also produced ready to run OO models. The model toolings were sold off to Rails of Sheffield and Accurascale when the company ceased trading in 2024.
- Heljan – A semi-major player in the business, less notable than other companies though.
- Hornby – One of the largest manufacturers of ready-to-run OO. Originally known as 'Hornby Railways'
- Kitmaster – Manufactured plastic model kits of locomotives, rolling stock, and buildings.
- Lima – Produced budget OO ready-to-run, bought by Hornby.
- Peco – Produce a wide range of track, kits, and other accessories.
- Rapido Trains UK – A subsidiary brand of the Canadian Rapido Trains Inc. specializing in UK model trains.
- Sonic Models – A relatively new manufacturer that makes OO and N Gauge models.
- Tri-ang Railways – A former manufacturer whose name was dropped when their parent company acquired the Hornby brand; they made models of locomotives and rolling stock.
- Planet Industrials – A new manufacturer in the business, known mostly for kits but has produced Ready to Run (RTR) versions of the Kerr, Stuart and Company 'Victory' class locomotive.
