= Protofour =

P4
- Scale: 4 mm to 1 ft (305 mm)
- Scale ratio: 1:76.2
- Model gauge: 18.83 mm (0.741 in)
- Prototype gauge: Standard gauge
- Website: www.scalefour.org

Protofour or P4 is a set of standards for model railways allowing construction of models to a scale of 4 mm to 300 mm (1 ft) (1:76.2), the predominant scale of model railways of the British prototype. For historical reasons almost all manufacturers of British prototype models use OO gauge (1:76.2 models running on 16.5 mm (0.65 in) gauge track). There are several finescale standards which have been developed to enable more accurate models than OO, and P4 is the most accurate in common use.

The P4 standards specify a scale model track gauge of 18.83 mm (0.741 in) for standard gauge railways. Joe Brook Smith was the first to propose use of an exact scale track gauge in July 1964, when also the term Protofour was invented by Malcolm Cross. The standards were later published in Model Railway News by the Model Railway Study Group in August 1966.

Just as in the prototype railway, on a model the wheel-rail interface is the fundamental aspect of reliable operation. So as well as a track gauge, P4 also specifies the wheel profile and track parameters to use, which are largely a scaled-down version of real-life standards with some allowances for practical manufacturing tolerances.

P4 standards have been extended to several other prototypes. Broader than standard gauges have been modelled using P4 standards, including Brunel's 7 ft 1/4 in (2,140 mm) gauge, modelled with 28.08 mm (1.106 in) track and Irish P4, the 5 ft 3 in (1,600 mm) Irish broad gauge modelled in P4 in 4 mm scale with 21 mm (0.827 in) gauge track. Several successful models of narrow gauge prototypes with a correspondingly accurate track gauges have also been produced to P4 standards.

P4 standards are promoted worldwide by the Scalefour Society, which is based in the United Kingdom. The EM Gauge Society also provides support for modelling to P4 standards: many P4 modellers belong to both societies. The standards document is hosted by the Scalefour Society and the society's Central London Area Group (CLAG) make a HTML version available.

== S4 Standard ==
The S4 Standard is maintained as part of the P4 standards. The S4 Standard removes an allowance in the P4 standards for the tight (compared to the prototype) curves used on model railways. The wheel back to back in S4 is therefore slightly wider than P4, and the related track work dimensions are dead-scale.

== See also ==
- EM gauge
- Finescale standard
- Rail transport modelling scales
