= List of track gauges =

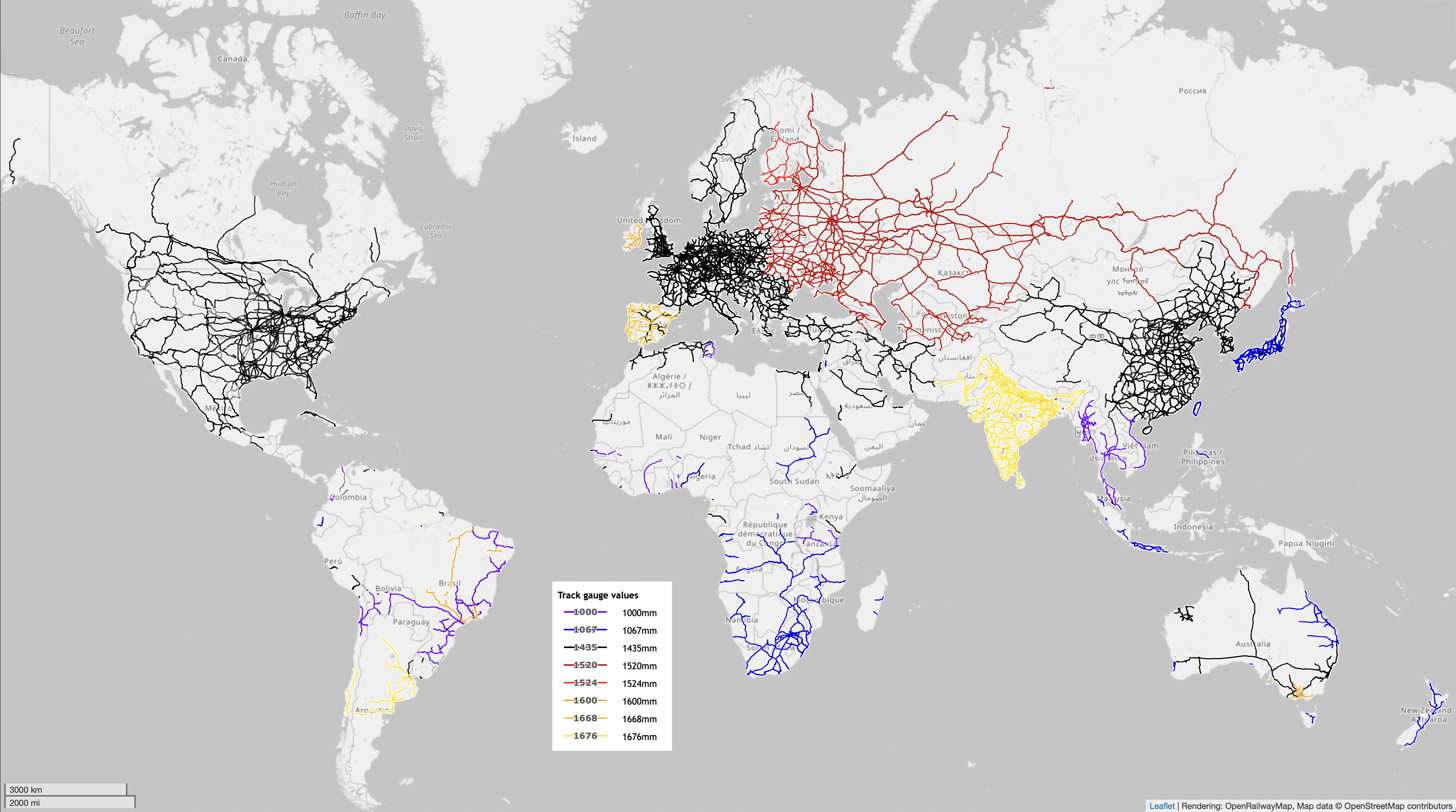
Map of the world's railways showing the different major gauges in use Meter gauge (1,000 mm) Cape gauge (1,067 mm) Standard gauge (1,435 mm) Russian gauge (1,520 mm) Five foot gauge (1,524 mm) Irish gauge (1,600 mm) Iberian gauge (1,668 mm) Indian gauge (1,676 mm)

This list presents an overview of railway track gauges by size. A gauge is measured between the inner faces of the rails.

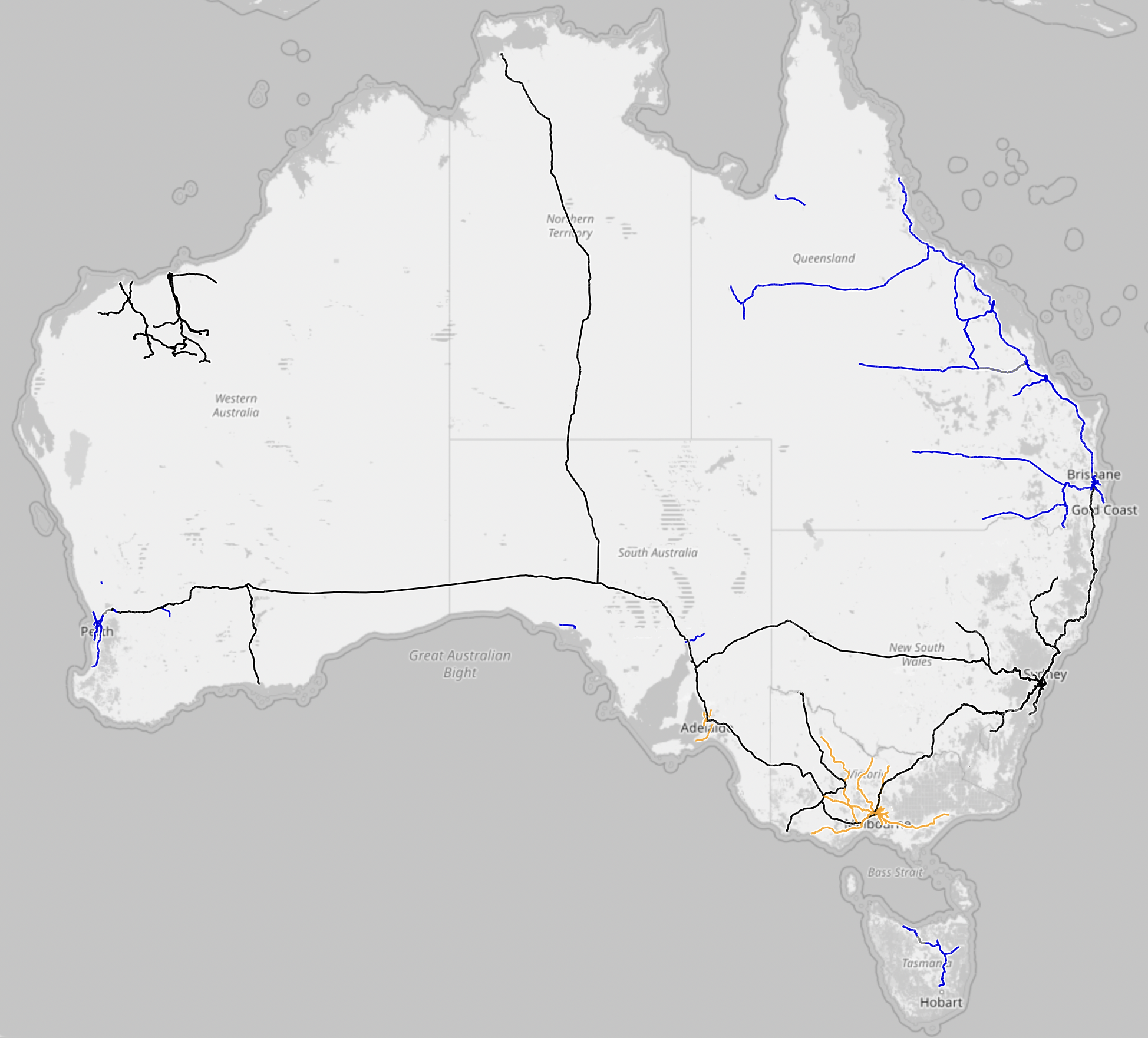
Narrow gauge (1,067 mm) Standard gauge (1,435 mm) Broad gauge (1,600 mm) The large network of narrow-gauge sugar cane light railways, almost all 610 mm (2 ft) gauge, is not shown. See Rail gauge in Australia.

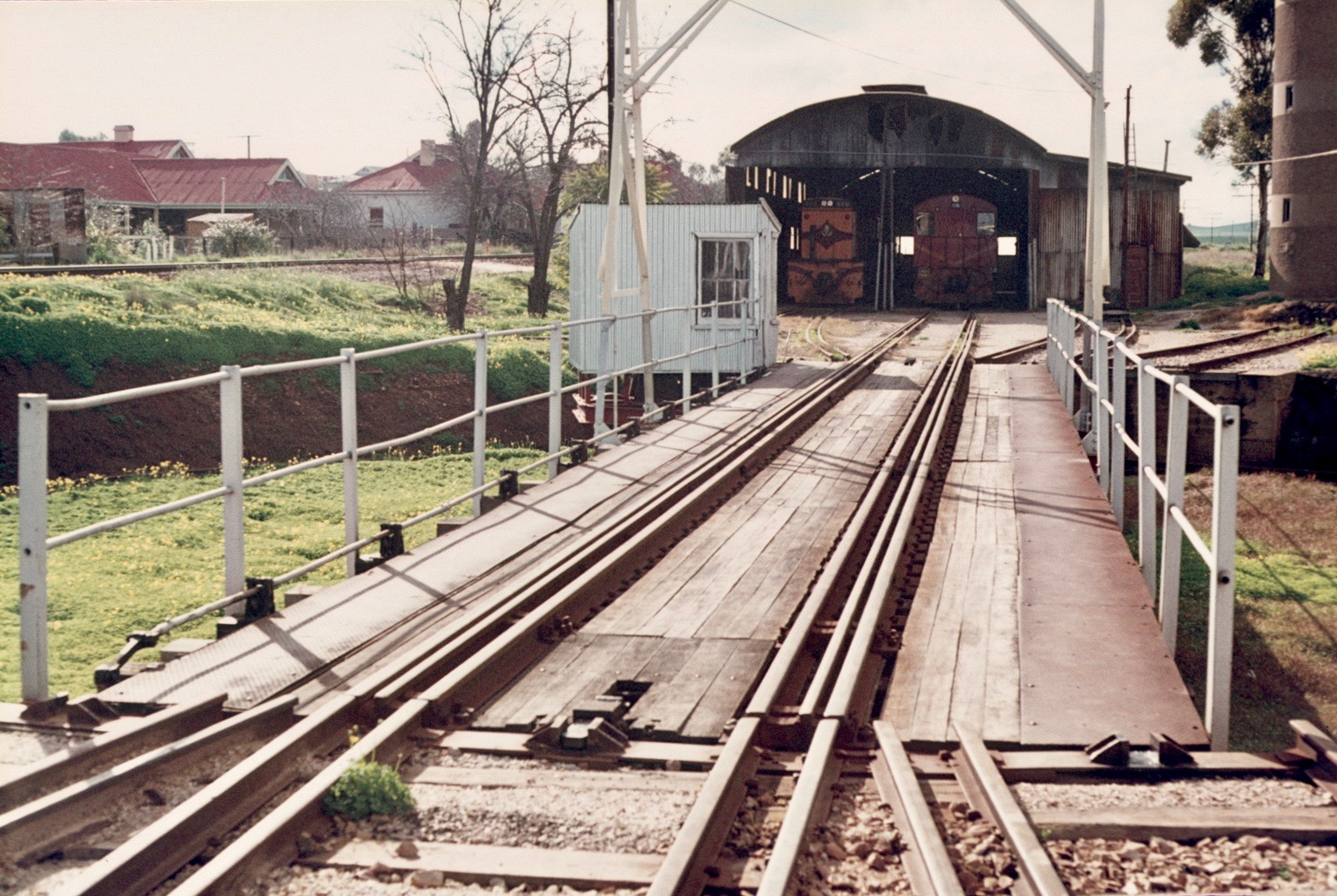
Triple-gauge track on turntable, Gladstone, South Australia

== Track gauges by size ==
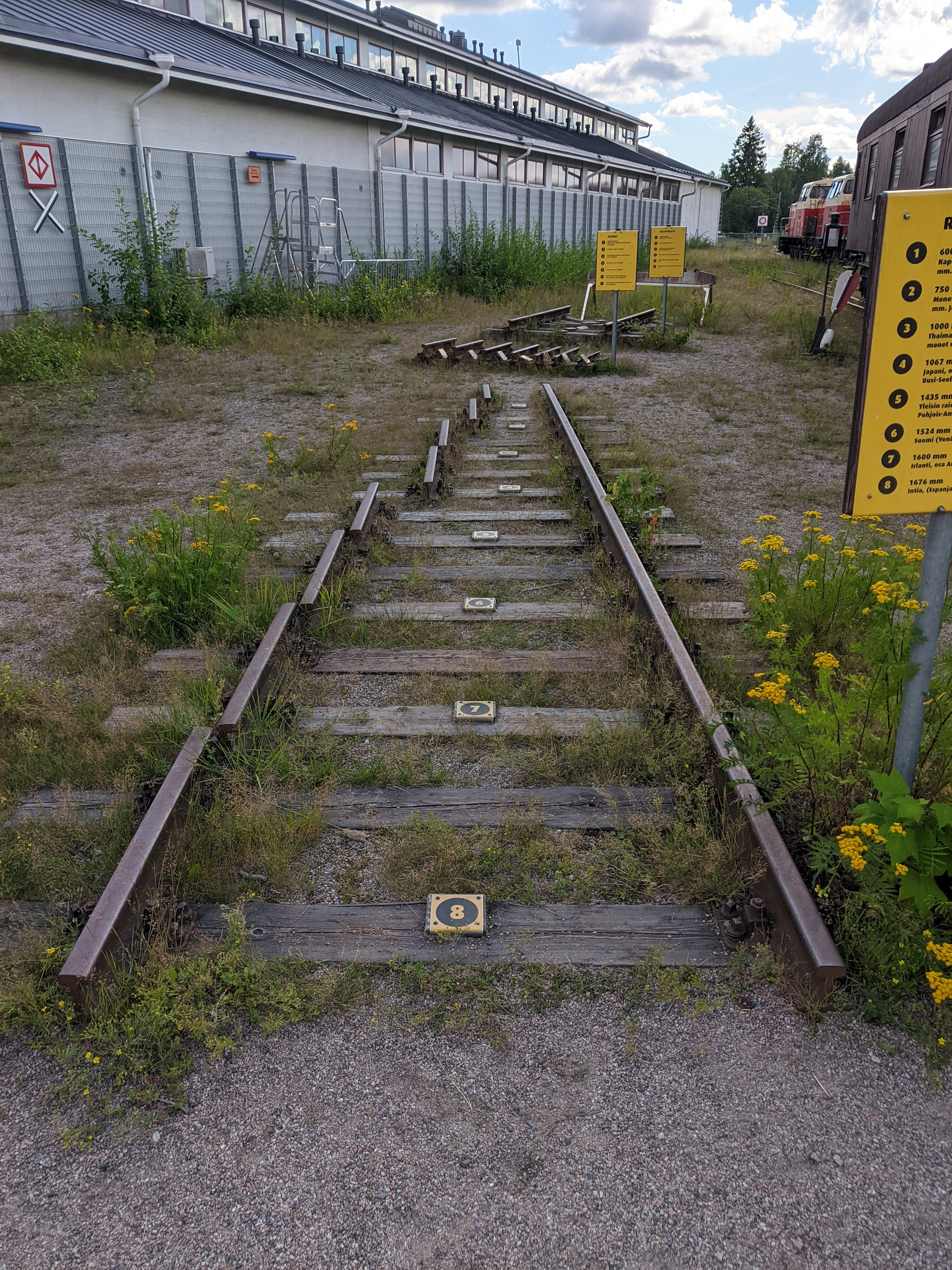
Museum display showing comparison of the following track gauges: 600 mm 750 mm Meter gauge (1,000 mm) Cape gauge (1,067 mm) Standard gauge (1,435 mm) Five foot gauge (1,524 mm) Irish gauge (1,600 mm) Indian gauge (1,676 mm)

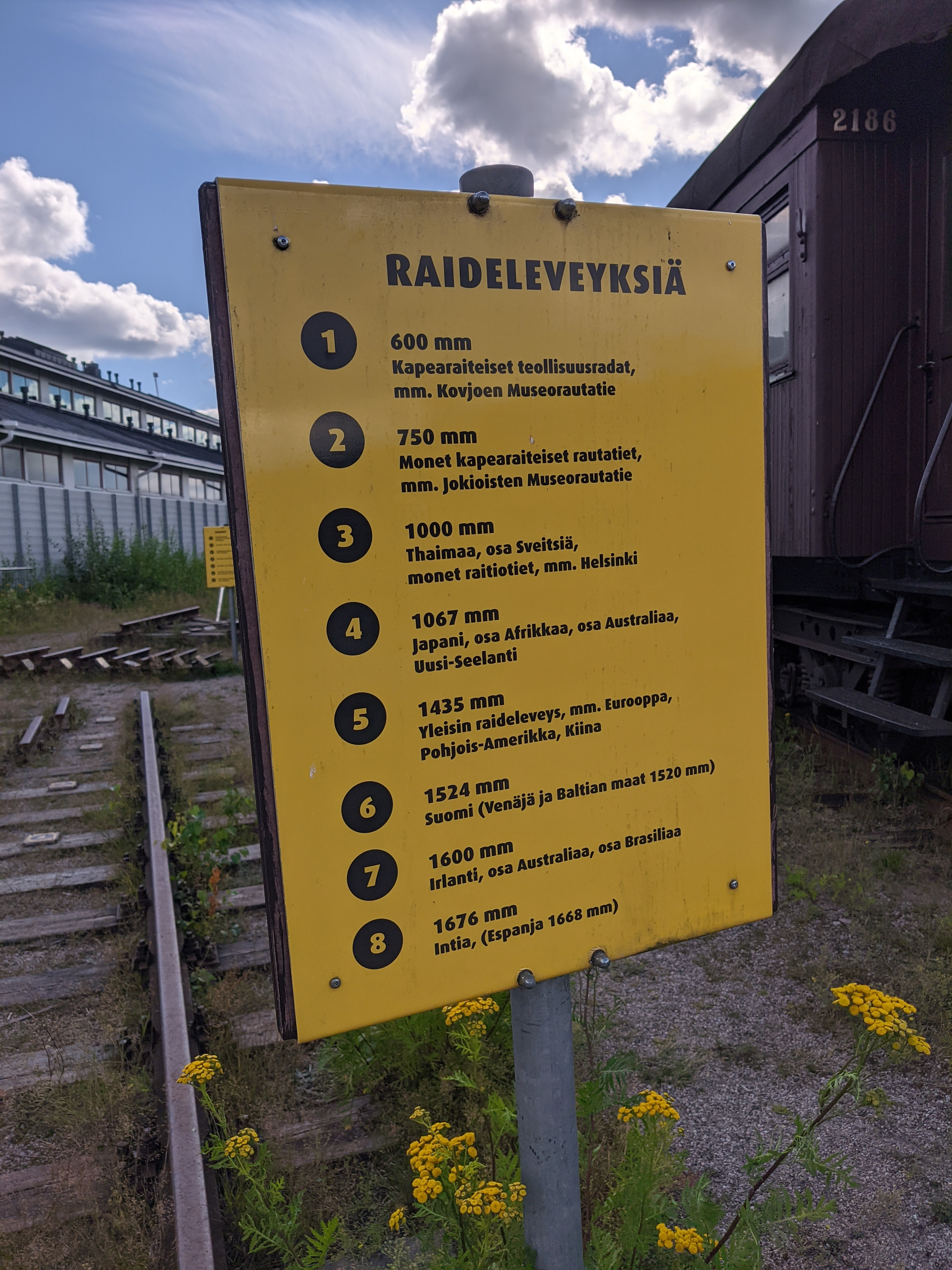

=== Model railways ===
Model railway gauges are covered in rail transport modelling scales.

Comparison of model railway scales gauges

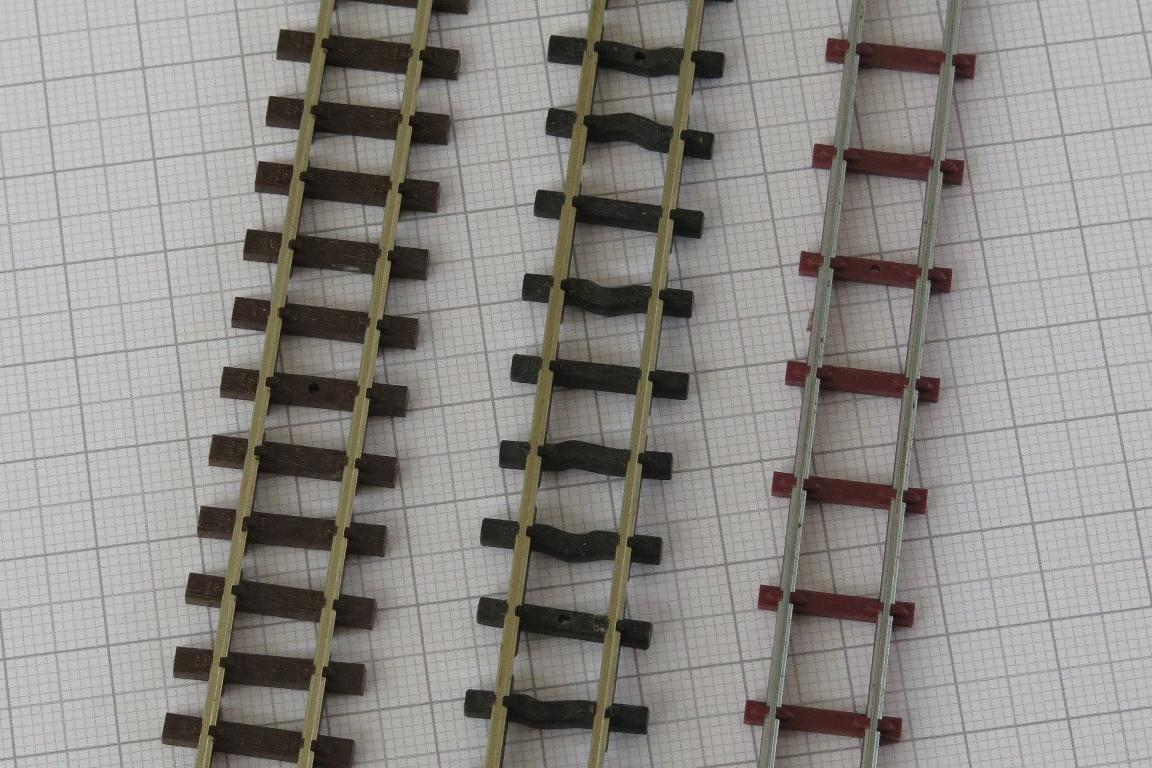
HOn2½, HO9 and HOe gauge track

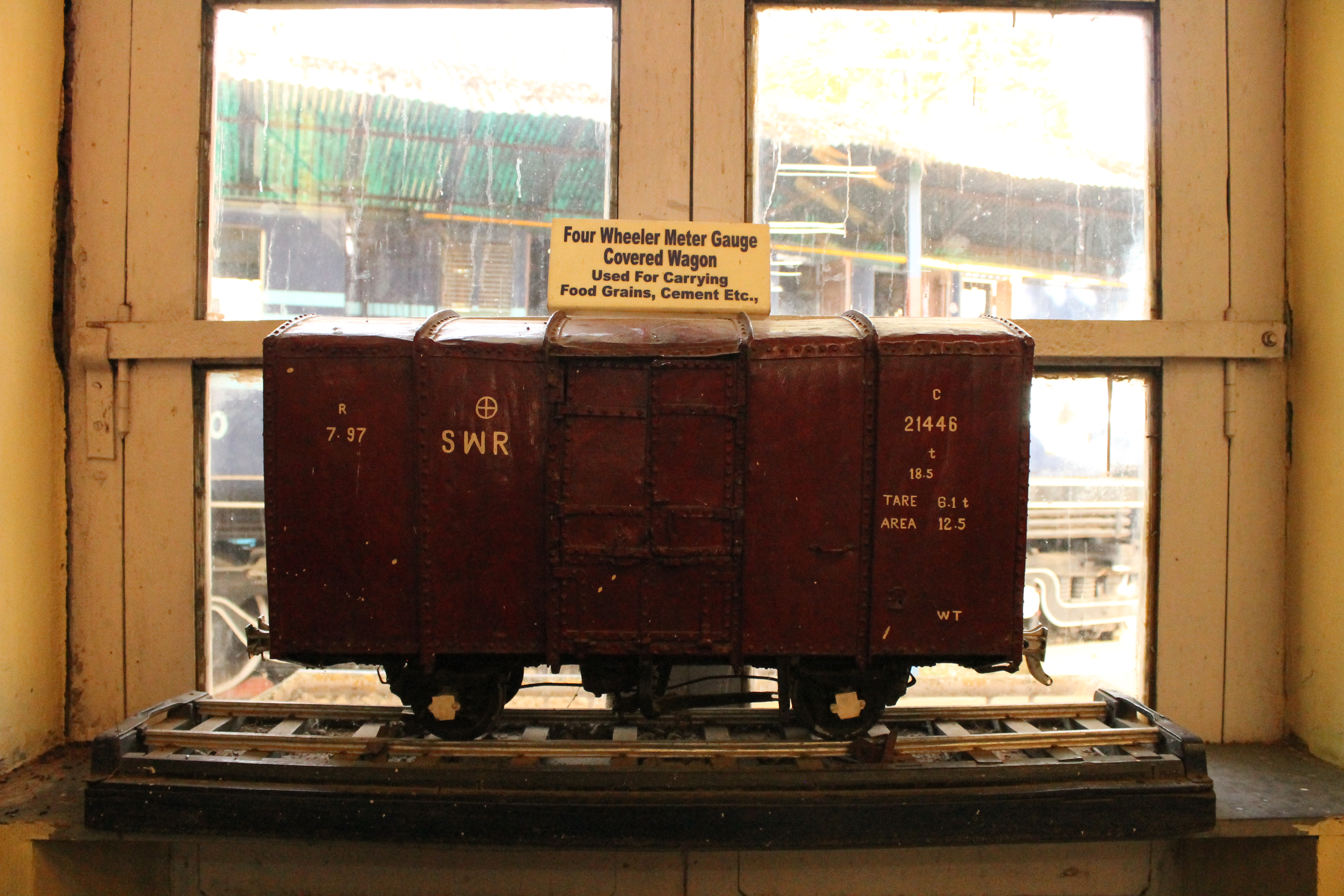
Model of a meter gauge freight wagon

Gauge		Country	Notes
Metric	Imperial	Country	Notes
3 mm	1/8 in 3 mm (0.118 in)		Scale 1/40 in (0.635 mm) to 1 ft (305 mm). 2/75 in (0.677 mm) to 1 ft (305 mm). 2 mm to 1 m. Scale ratio 1:450 (Japanese 3 ft 6 in (1,067 mm) gauge). 1:480 (Standard gauge). 1:500 (Standard and broad gauge). Models at N, Z, Ze and T gauges. See T gauge Finescale standard List of narrow-gauge model railway scales Model military vehicle Rail transport modelling Rail transport modelling scales
4 mm	5/32 in		4 mm to 1 ft, Scale 4 mm to 1 ft (305 mm). Scale ratio 1:76.2. See EM gauge Finescale standard Protofour; 4 mm scale List of narrow-gauge model railway scales Model military vehicle Rail transport modelling Rail transport modelling scales
6.50 mm	1/4 in 6.5 mm / 0.256 in		Scale 1.385 mm to 1 ft (305 mm). Scale ratio 1:220. See Z scale Finescale standard Model military vehicle Rail transport modelling Rail transport modelling scales
6.50 mm	1/4 in 6.5 mm / 0.256 in		H0f. Model gauge Model gauge 6.5 mm (0.256 in). Standard(s) NEM 010. Prototype gauge 600 mm (2 ft). Scale 3.5 mm to 1 ft (305 mm). Scale ratio 1:87. See H0f gauge HOn2 gauge Finescale standard Model military vehicle Rail transport modelling Rail transport modelling scales
6.50 mm	1/4 in 6.5 mm / 0.256 in		Model gauge 7.06 mm (0.278 in). Scale 1.385 mm to 1 ft (305 mm). Scale ratio 1:87.1. See H0f gauge HOn2 gauge Finescale standard Model military vehicle Rail transport modelling Rail transport modelling scales
7 mm	9/32 in		Scale 7 mm per foot. Scale ratio 1:43.5. See 7 mm scale 7mm Narrow Gauge Association; ScaleSeven; Finescale standard Protofour; 4 mm scale O14; Model military vehicle Rail transport modelling Rail transport modelling scales
7 mm	9/32 in		British 0 gauge 1 1/4 in 32 mm (0 gauge) 4 ft 6 3/4 in Prototype gauge, Standard Gauge
7 mm	9/32 in		ScaleSeven (standard) 1 5/16 in 33 mm 4 ft 8 1/2 in 4 ft 8 1/2 in (1,435 mm) standard gauge
7 mm	9/32 in		ScaleSeven (Irish) 1 7/16 in 36.75 mm 5 ft 3 in Prototype broad gauges 5 ft 3 in (1,600 mm) Irish gauge
7 mm	9/32 in		ScaleSeven (Great Western) 1 15/16 in 49.2 mm 7' 0¼" Great Western broad gauge Prototype broad gauges 7 ft (2,134 mm)
7 mm	9/32 in		O21 13/16 in 21 mm 3' Prototype narrow gauges 3 ft (914 mm)
7 mm	9/32 in		O16.5 21/32 in 16.5 mm (H0 gauge) 2' 4¼" 2' - 2'6" Prototype narrow gauges
7 mm	9/32 in		O14 9/16 in 14 mm 2' Prototype narrow gauges 2 ft (610 mm)
7 mm	9/32 in		O9 11/32 in 9 mm (N gauge) 15 1/2" Prototype narrow gauges 15 in (381 mm)
7.06 mm	9/32 in		HOn2. Model gauge 7.06 mm (0.278 in). Scale 3.5 mm to 1 foot. Scale ratio 1:87.1. See HOn2 gauge H0f gauge Finescale standard Model military vehicle Rail transport modelling Rail transport modelling scales
9 mm	11/32 in		Scale ratio 1:148 (United Kingdom); Modelling British railway prototypes British N gauge 1:150 (Japan) 1:160 (elsewhere). See N scale British N gauge HOn30 gauge 3 mm scale 3 ft gauge rail modelling Finescale standard Rail transport modelling Rail transport modelling scales
9 mm	11/32 in		Model gauge 9 mm (0.354 in). Scale 4 mm to 1 ft (305 mm). Scale ratio 1:76. See OO9; Finescale standard Rail transport modelling Rail transport modelling scales
9 mm	11/32 in		Model gauge 9 mm (0.354 in). Scale 3.5 mm to 1 ft (305 mm).Scale ratio 1:87. See H0e; Finescale standard Rail transport modelling Rail transport modelling scales
9 mm	11/32 in		British N gauge. Model gauge 9 mm (0.354 in) Scale 2 1/16mm to 1 ft (305 mm). Scale ratio 1:148. See British N gauge Modelling British railway prototypes Finescale standard Rail transport modelling Rail transport modelling scales
9.42 mm	3/8 in		2 mm to 1 ft, Scale ratio 1:152.4. See 2 mm scale Finescale standard Rail transport modelling Rail transport modelling scales
12 mm	15/32 in		Scale 5.5 mm to 1ft. Scale ratio 1:55. 5.5 mm to 1 foot scale (1:55.4 or 1:55). See 5.5 mm scale Finescale standard Rail transport modelling Rail transport modelling scales
12 mm	15/32 in		Scale 5.5 mm to 1ft. Scale ratio 1:55. 5.5 mm to 1 foot scale (1:55.4 or 1:55). See 00n3 Finescale standard Rail transport modelling Rail transport modelling scales
12 mm	15/32 in		Scale 1/10 in (2.54 mm) to 1 ft (305 mm).Scale ratio 1:120 See TT scale 3 mm scale Finescale standard Rail transport modelling Rail transport modelling scales
12 mm	15/32 in		Model gauge 12 mm (0.472 in). HOn3 1/2 scale. Scale 3.5 mm to 1 ft (305 mm). Scale ratio 1:87. See HOn3½ gauge Finescale standard Rail transport modelling Rail transport modelling scales
12 mm	15/32 in		H0m gauge. Model gauge 12 mm (0.472 in). Scale 3.5 mm to 1 ft (305 mm). Scale ratio 1:87. See H0m gauge Finescale standard Rail transport modelling Rail transport modelling scales
12.7 mm	1/2 in 12.7 mm (0.5 in)		Scale 6.35 mm to 1 foot. Scale ratio 1:48. See On2 gauge Finescale standard Rail transport modelling Rail transport modelling scales
14 mm	9/16 in		Scale 7 mm to 1 ft. Scale ratio 1:43.5. See O14; Finescale standard Rail transport modelling Rail transport modelling scales
16.5 mm	21/32 in		3.5 mm Scale 3.5 mm to 1 ft (305 mm). Scale ratio 1:87 (world) 1:80 (Japan). 0 0/14 in, 1:87 scale (3.5 mm to 1 foot). See HO scale HOn30 gauge Finescale standard Rail transport modelling Rail transport modelling scales
16.5 mm	21/32 in		See On30 gauge Finescale standard Rail transport modelling Rail transport modelling scales
16.5 mm	21/32 in		4 mm to 1 ft (00 scale 1:76), (3.5 mm to 1 foot), Model gauge 16.5 mm (0.65 in) 16.5 mm 0 0/65 in. See OO gauge Finescale standard Rail transport modelling Rail transport modelling scales
16.5 mm	21/32 in		Scale 3.5 mm to 1 foot. Scale ratio 1:87.1. See Proto:87; Finescale standard Rail transport modelling Rail transport modelling scales
16.5 mm	21/32 in		Model gauge 16.5 mm (0.65 in). Scale. 5.5 mm to 1ft. Scale ratio 1:55. 5.5 mm to 1 foot scale (1:55.4 or 1:55). See 5.5 mm scale Finescale standard Rail transport modelling Rail transport modelling scales
16.5 mm	21/32 in		Model gauge 16.5 mm (0.65 in). Scale 4 mm to 1 ft. Scale ratio 1:76.2. See OO gauge or OO scale 4 mm scale Finescale standard Rail transport modelling Rail transport modelling scales
16.5 mm	21/32 in		Model gauge 16.5 mm (0.65 in). Scale 7 mm to 1 ft. Scale ratio 1:43.5. See O16.5; Finescale standard Rail transport modelling Rail transport modelling scales
16.5 mm	21/32 in		Model gauge 16.5 mm (0.65 in). Scale ratio 1:22.5 – 1:29. Typical models built are between 1:20.3 and 1:24, or up to 1:29. See Gn15; Finescale standard Rail transport modelling Rail transport modelling scales
16.5 mm	21/32 in		Model gauge 16.5 mm (0.65 in). Sn3 1/2. Scale 3 16/in (4.8 mm) to 1 ft (305 mm). Scale ratio 1:64. See [[Sn3 1/2]] Finescale standard Rail transport modelling Rail transport modelling scales
16.5 mm	21/32 in		Model gauge 16.5 mm (0.65 in). Scale 4 mm to 1 ft (305 mm). Scale ratio 1:76.2. See 4 mm scale Finescale standard Rail transport modelling Rail transport modelling scales
18.83 mm	3/4 in		Scale 4 mm to 1 ft (305 mm). Scale ratio 1:76.2. See Protofour or P4; Finescale standard Rail transport modelling Rail transport modelling scales
22.4 mm and 23 mm	0 0/88 22.4 mm 0.883 in Model gauge and 0 0/91 23.0 mm 0.905 Model gauge		Scale 3/16 inch to 1 foot. Scale ratio 1:64. See S scale or S gauge Finescale standard Rail transport modelling Rail transport modelling scales
32 mm	1 1/4 in		British: 7 mm to 1 ft (7 mm to 304.8 mm, 1:43.5); Continental Europe: 1:43.5 and 1:45; American: 1/4 in to 1 ft (6.35 mm to 304.8 mm, 1:48). See O scale or O gauge Finescale standard Rail transport modelling Rail transport modelling scales
32 mm	1 1/4 in		Model gauge 32 mm (1.26 in). Scale 7/8 in to 1 ft. Scale ratio 1:13.7. See SE scale Finescale standard Rail transport modelling Rail transport modelling scales
32 mm	1 1/4 in		0 0/35 in Model gauge 32 mm (1.26 in). Scale 7/8 in to 1 ft. Scale ratio 1:13.7 and 9 mm 1:34. See Finescale standard Rail transport modelling Rail transport modelling scales
32 mm	1 1/4 in		0 0/35 in Model gauge 32 mm (1.26 in). Scale 7/8 in to 1 ft. Scale ratio 1:13.7 and 1:20.3. See F scale Fn2; Finescale standard Rail transport modelling Rail transport modelling scales
32 mm	1 1/4 in		0 0/35 in Model gauge 32 mm (1.26 in). Scale 16 mm to 1 foot. Scale ratio 1:19.05. 1:19. See 16 mm scale or SM32; Finescale standard Rail transport modelling Rail transport modelling scales
45 mm	1 25/32 in		G gauge Scale ratio 1:22.5 See G scale or G scale, G gauge, large scale Finescale standard Rail transport modelling Rail transport modelling scales
45 mm	1 25/32 in		Model gauge 45 mm (1.772 in). Scale 7/8 in to 1 ft. Scale ratio 1:13.7. See SE scale Finescale standard Rail transport modelling Rail transport modelling scales
45 mm	1 25/32 in		Model gauge 45 mm (1.772 in). Scale 7/8 in to 1 ft. Scale ratio 1:13.7. 1/2 1:24. See H scale Finescale standard Rail transport modelling Rail transport modelling scales
45 mm	1 25/32 in		Model gauge 45 mm (1.772 in). Scale 7/8 in to 1 ft. Scale ratio 1:13.7. 1:20.3. See F scale Fn3; Finescale standard Rail transport modelling Rail transport modelling scales
45 mm	1 25/32 in		Model gauge 45 mm (1.772 in). Scale 7/8 in to 1 ft. Scale ratio 1:13.7. 1:19. See 16 mm scale or SM45; Finescale standard Rail transport modelling Rail transport modelling scales.

=== Minimum and ridable miniature railways ===
For ridable miniature railways and minimum-gauge railways, the gauges are overlapping. There are also some extreme narrow-gauge railways listed. See: Distinction between a ridable miniature railway and a minimum-gauge railway for clarification.

Model railway gauges are covered in rail transport modelling scales.

Comparison of model railway scales gauges. 1:8 Live Steam Minimum-gauges railway & Ridable miniature railway gauges

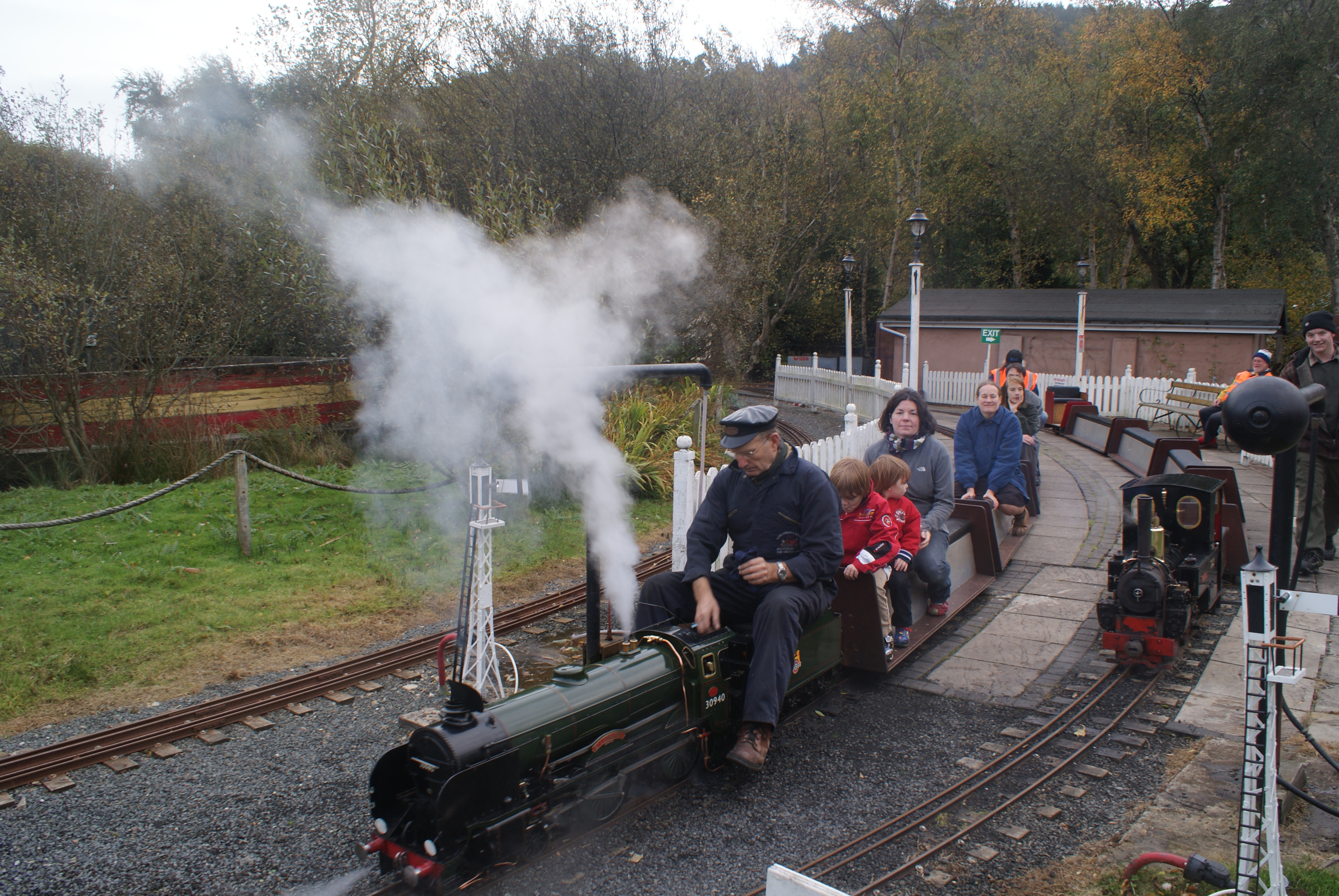
Train with model Southern Railway Schools class on the dual-gauge Orchid Line

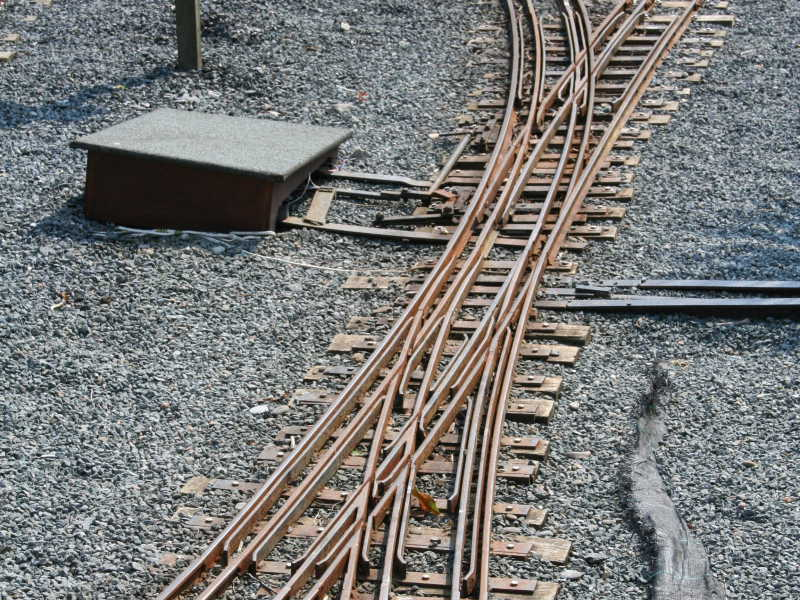
Triple-gauge pointwork (3 1/2 in, 5 in, and 7 1/4 in) on the Orchid Line. The upper right branch does not include the 3 1/2 in gauge.

Gauge		Country	Notes
Metric	Imperial	Country	Notes
89 mm	3 1/2 in		See 3 1/2 in (89 mm) gauge ridable miniature railways.
121 mm	4 3/4 in		See 4 3/4 in (121 mm) gauge ridable miniature railways.
127 mm	5 in		See 5 in (127 mm) gauge ridable miniature railways.
145 mm	5 23/32 in	Denmark	Brandhøjbanen^{dk}, at Hedeland veteran railway^{dk}, Hedeland, Hedehusene, Høje-Taastrup. Mixed gauge: 5 in (127 mm), 5 7/10 in (145 mm) and 7 1/4 in (184 mm) gauges are all in use on this model-miniature railway., there is also one at the Danish Railway Museum in Odense, one at the Skjoldenæsholm Tramway Museum, Jystrup, Ringsted, and many other model-miniature railways in Denmark and Modelbane Europa, Hadsten, Favrskov and many others.
184 mm	7 1/4 in		See 7 1/4 (184 mm) gauge ridable miniature railways.
190.5 mm	7 1/2 in		See 7 1/2 in (190.5 mm) gauge ridable miniature railways.
210 mm	8 1/4 in		See 8 1/4 in (210 mm) gauge ridable miniature railways.
229 mm	9 in		See 9 in (229 mm) gauge ridable miniature railways.
229 mm	9 in	England	Railway built by minimum-gauge pioneer Sir Arthur Heywood, later abandoned in favor of 15 in (381 mm) gauge.
240 mm	9 7/16 in		See 9 7/16 in (240 mm) gauge ridable miniature railways.
241 mm	9 1/2 in		See 9 1/2 in (241 mm) gauge ridable miniature railways.
260 mm	10 1/4 in		See 10 1/4 in (260 mm) gauge ridable miniature railways.
267 mm	10 1/2 in	England	Beale Park miniature railway
305 mm	12 in		See 12 in (305 mm) gauge ridable miniature railways.
311 mm	12 1/4 in	Wales	Fairbourne Railway
340 mm	13 3/8 in	Netherlands	Ridable miniature railway in DierenPark Amersfoort
350 mm	13 25/32 in	Netherlands	Collection Decauville Spoorweg Museum
356 mm	14 in	United States	See 14 in (356 mm) gauge ridable miniature railways and Chicago Tunnel Company (during construction process).
368 mm	14 1/2 in	United States	John J. Coit's Seaside Park Miniature Railway and Long Beach and Asbury Park Railway
381 mm	15 in		381 mm (15 in): Known as the "minimum gauge", this was used for several private estate railways and garden railways that were larger than hobby models but smaller than industrial lines. Experimental & Miniature Gauges, 381 mm (15 in): Known as the "minimum gauge", this was used for several private estate railways and garden railways that were larger than hobby models but smaller than industrial lines. See 15 in gauge railways.
400 mm	15 3/4 in	France	Agricultural field railways (Decauville portable track)
406 mm	16 in	United States	See 16 in (406 mm) gauge ridable miniature railways.
419 mm	16 1/2 in	Canada	See 16 1/2 in (419 mm) gauge ridable miniature railway.
419 mm	16 1/2 in	England	Berkhamsted Gasworks Railway
432 mm	17 in	England	Long Rake Spar mine, underground mine railway
450 mm	17 23/32 in	Czech Republic	Industrial railways
450 mm	17 23/32 in	England	Littlethorpe Potteries, hand-worked line connecting clay pits to pottery
457 mm	18 in	Australia	National Railway Museum, Port Adelaide
457 mm	18 in	England	Crewe Works Railway, Horwich Works Railway, Royal Arsenal Railway, Sand Hutton Light Railway, Steeple Grange Light Railway
457 mm	18 in	United States	Eastlake Park Scenic Railway, Venice Miniature Railway and Billy Jones Wildcat Railroad
470 mm	18 1/2 in	United States	Travel Town Museum miniature railway
483 mm	19 in	Isle of Man	Great Laxey Mine Railway
483 mm	19 in	United States	Swanton Pacific Railroad
495 mm	19 1/2 in	England	Ayle Colliery mine railway, Athole G. Allen Ltd. Closehouse Barytes Mine railway

=== Narrow gauge ===
Railways with a track gauge between 500 mm (19 3/4 in) and 4 ft 8 1/2 in (1,435 mm) standard gauge.

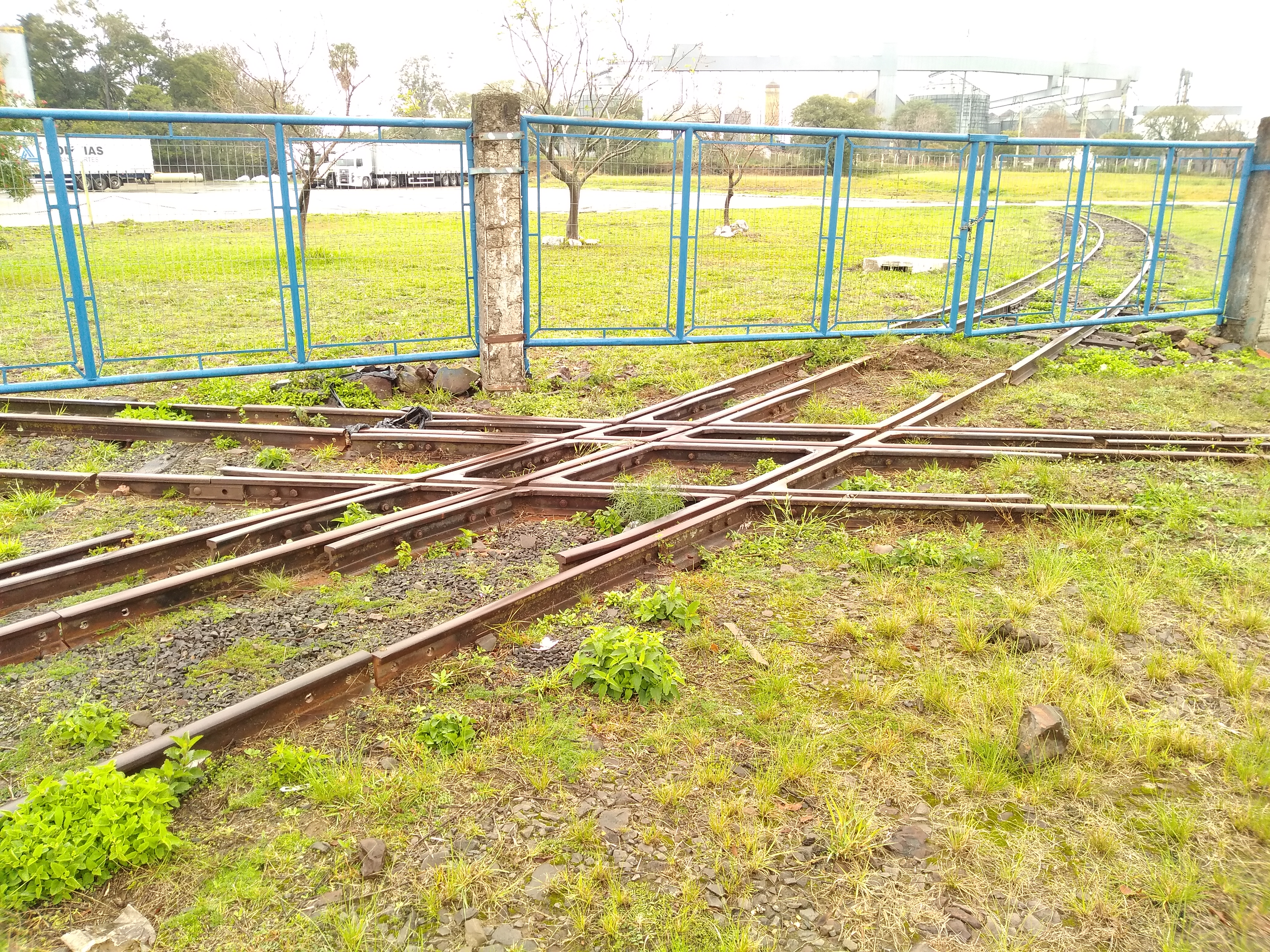
A diamond crossing of tracks of two different gauges

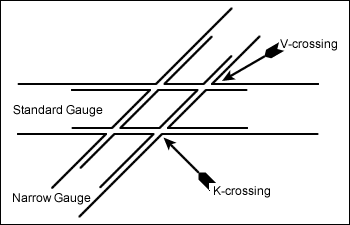
A diamond crossing of tracks of two different gauges

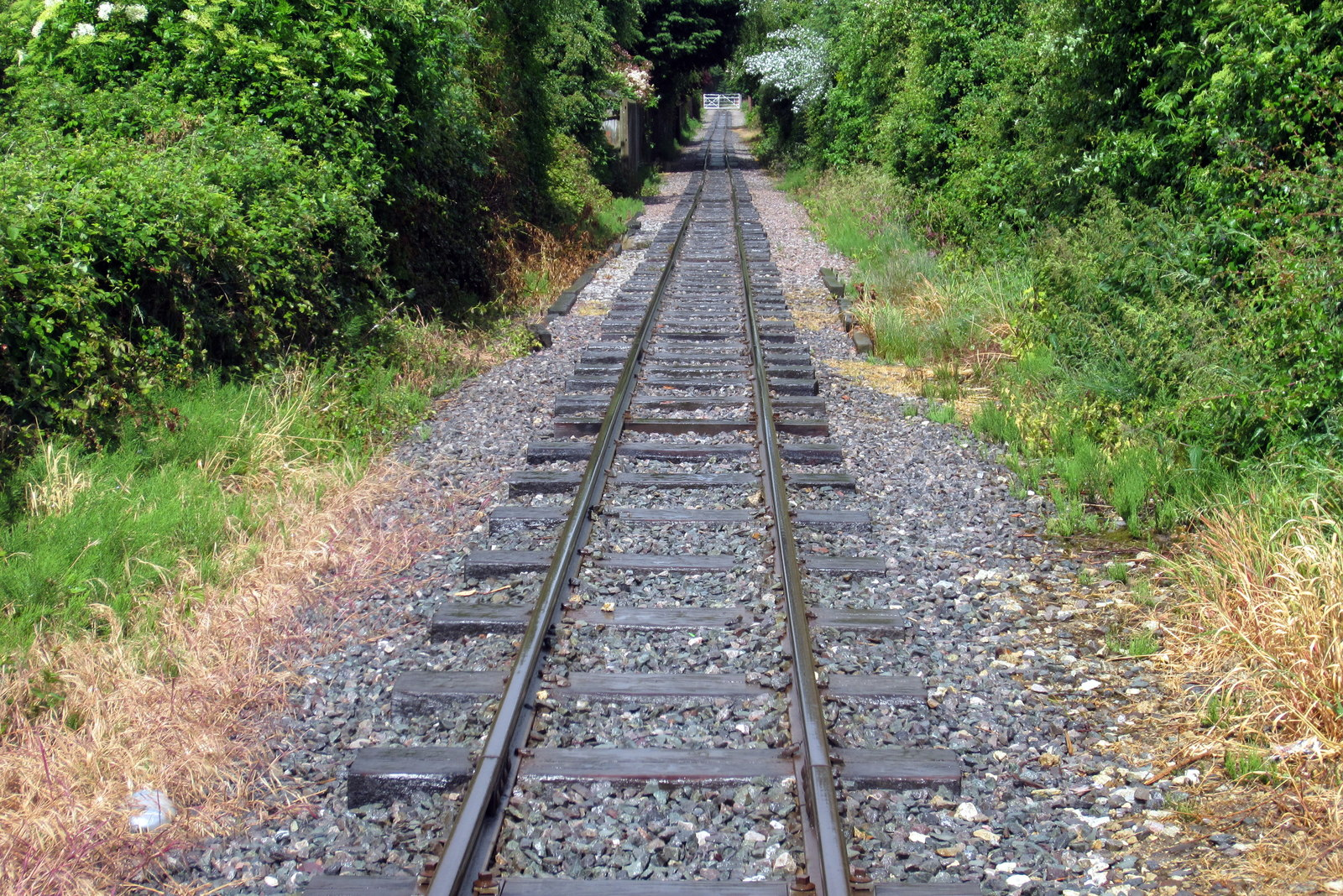
2 ft (610 mm) narrow-gauge track

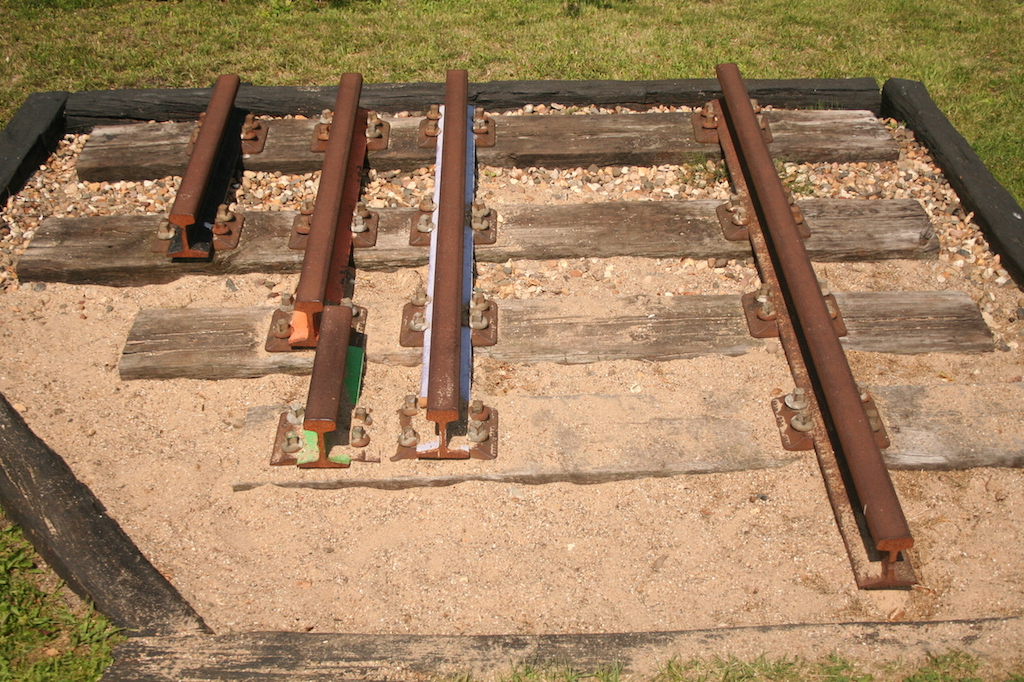
Comparison of four gauges in Hoorn: Standard gauge (1,435 mm) Cape gauge (1,067 mm) Meter gauge (1,000 mm) 750 mm

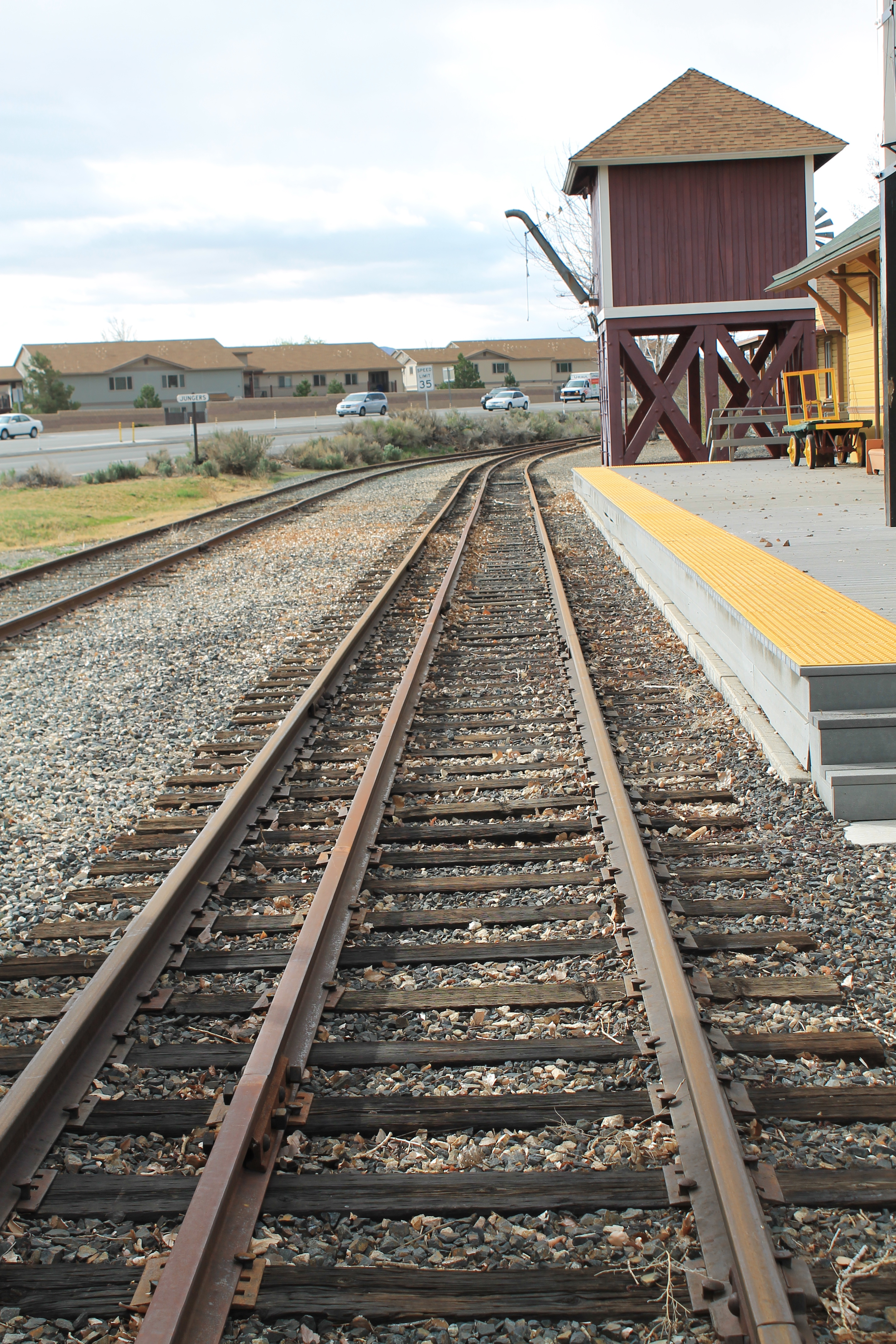
Dual-gauge track in Nevada: standard and 3 ft (914 mm)

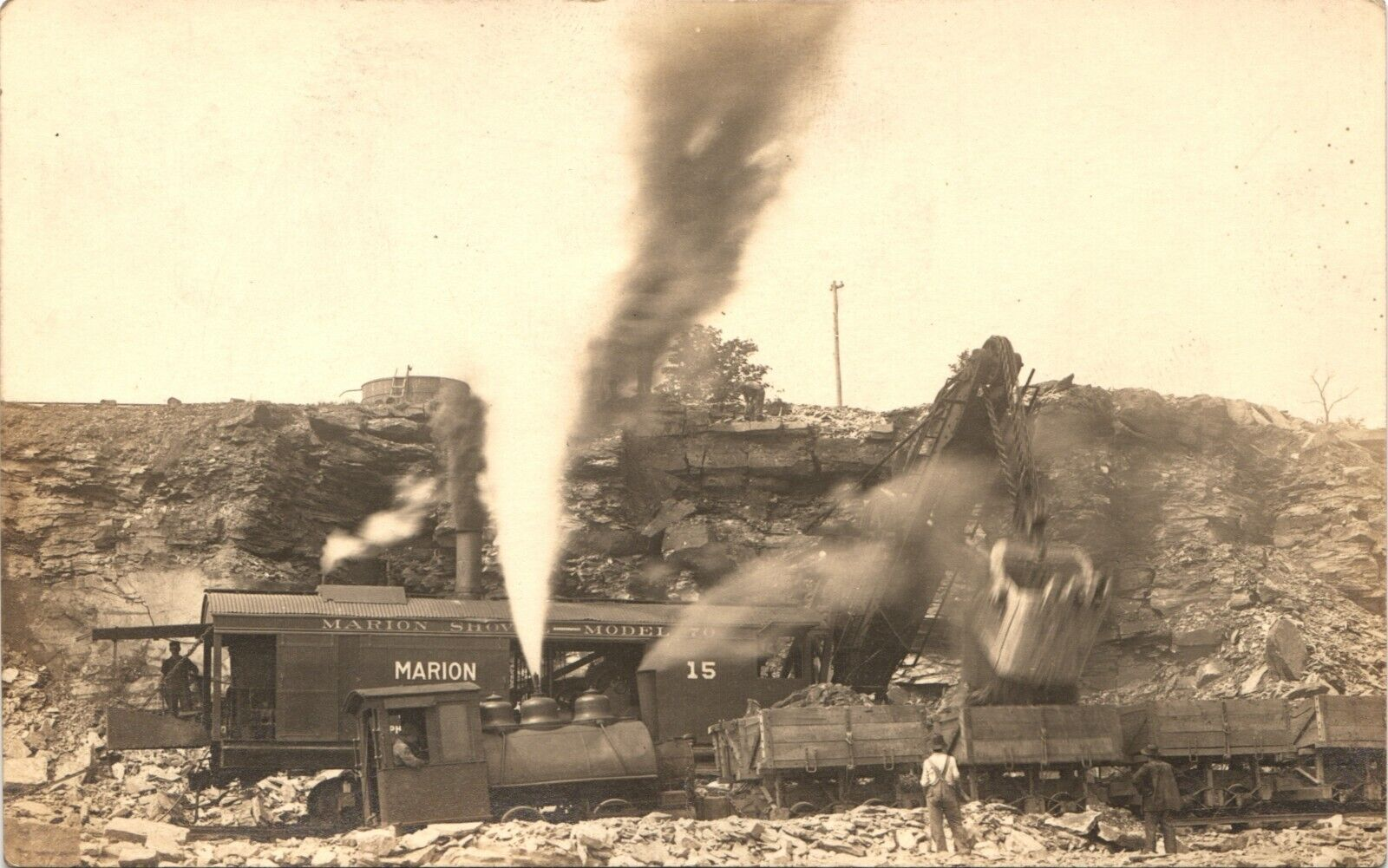
Marion Shovel Model 70 No 15 and narrow gauge railway

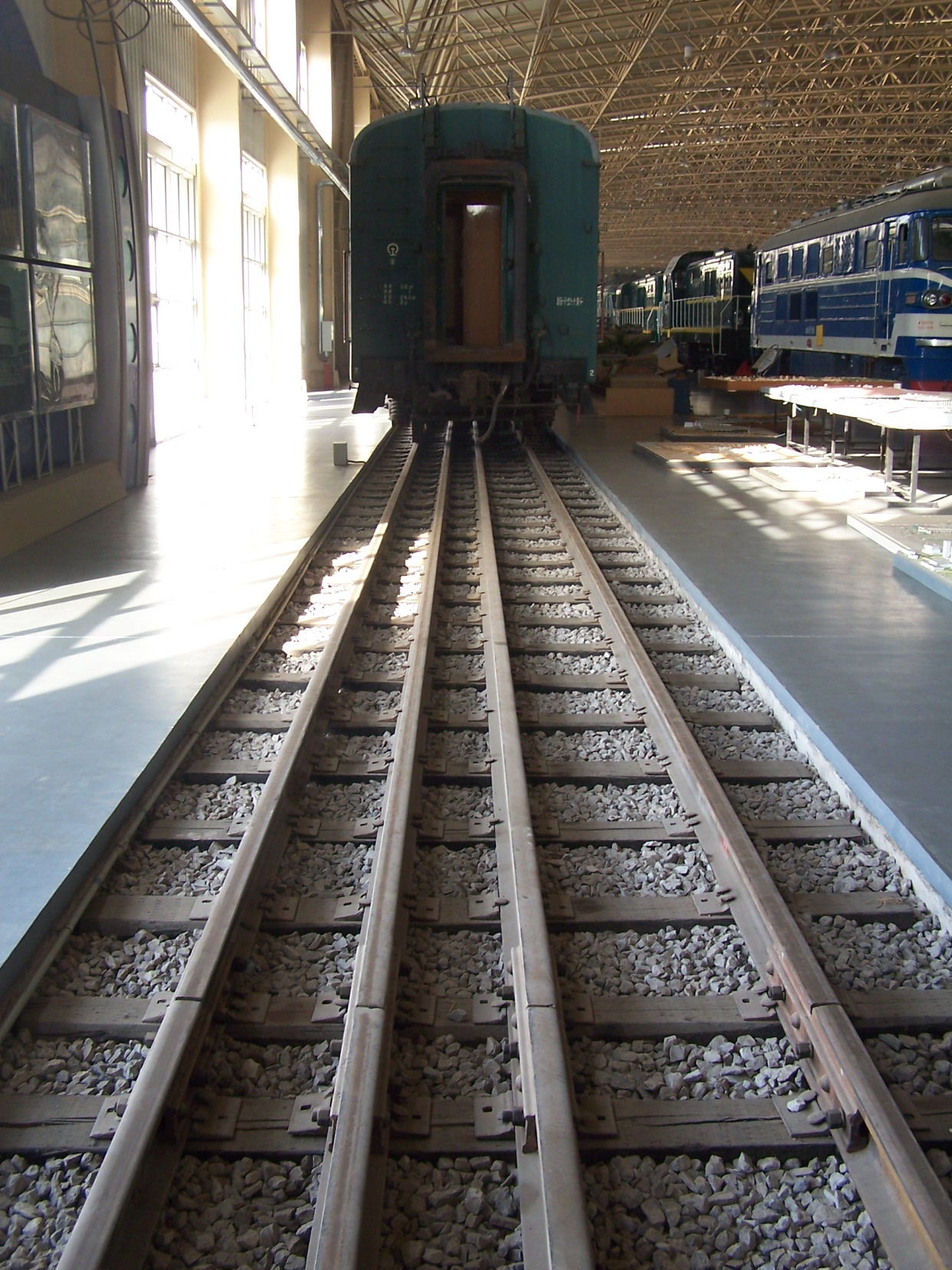
Different gauges, from left: 1435mm, 1000mm and 600mm, China Railway Museum, Beijing

Gauge		Country	Notes
Metric	Imperial	Country	Notes
500 mm	19 3/4 in	Argentina	Tren del Fin del Mundo, Ushuaia – Parque Nacional Tierra del Fuego
500 mm	19 3/4 in	Austria	Geriatriezentrum Am Wienerwald Feldbahn
500 mm	19 3/4 in	France	Several Decauville portable railways, Chemin de Fer Touristique du Tarn, Petit train d'Artouste
500 mm	19 3/4 in	Hungary	Mining railways in Pilisszentiván (defunct), Törökszentmiklós brick factory
508 mm	20 in	England	Great Woburn Railway situated in Woburn Safari Park; and North Bay Railway near Scarborough: Shipley Glen Tramway, Shipley Glen the town of Baildon and the village of Saltaire, West Yorkshire.
508 mm	20 in	Russia	Krasnoyarsk Child Railway
508 mm	20 in	United States	Confusion Hill
520 mm	20 15/32 in	Germany	Several mine railways. Origine: from 1 ft 8 in preußische Zoll = 523.2 mm.
533 mm	21 in	England	Pleasure Beach Express
550 mm	21 21/32 in	Germany	Mine railways in Mayen
557 mm	21 15/16 in	Dominican Republic	Transport in the Dominican Republic
560 mm	22 1/16 in	Germany	Salt mine railway in Berchtesgaden
575 mm	22 5/8 in	Germany	Iron ore mine railways in Bad Ems and Ramsbeck
578 mm	1 ft 10 3/4 in	United States	Lakeside Amusement Park & San Francisco Zoo
578 mm	1 ft 10 3/4 in	Wales	Penrhyn Quarry Railway
580 mm	22 27/32 in	Austria	Wolfsegg Traunthaler Kohlenwerke in Ampflwang im Hausruckwald
580 mm	22 27/32 in	Hungary	Mining railways in Dorog (defunct)
597 mm	1 ft 11 1/2 in		See 2 ft and 600 mm gauge railways 2 ft gauge railways in Australia; 2 ft and 600 mm gauge railways in the United Kingdom; 2 ft 6 in gauge railways in the United Kingdom; 2 ft gauge railroads in the United States; 2 ft 6 in gauge railroads in the United States
600 mm	1 ft 11 5/8 in		See 2 ft and 600 mm gauge railways 2 ft gauge railways in Australia; 2 ft and 600 mm gauge railways in the United Kingdom; 2 ft 6 in gauge railways in the United Kingdom; 2 ft gauge railroads in the United States; 2 ft 6 in gauge railroads in the United States
603 mm	1 ft 11 3/4 in		See 2 ft and 600 mm gauge railways 2 ft gauge railways in Australia; 2 ft and 600 mm gauge railways in the United Kingdom; 2 ft 6 in gauge railways in the United Kingdom; 2 ft gauge railroads in the United States; 2 ft 6 in gauge railroads in the United States
610 mm	2 ft		See 2 ft and 600 mm gauge railways 2 ft gauge railways in Australia; 2 ft and 600 mm gauge railways in the United Kingdom; 2 ft 6 in gauge railways in the United Kingdom; 2 ft gauge railroads in the United States; 2 ft 6 in gauge railroads in the United States
620 mm	2 ft 13/32 in	Slovenia	Cave railway in the Postojna Cave
622 mm	2 ft 1/2 in	Wales	Penrhyn Quarry Railway, until 1879
630 mm	24 13/16 in	Germany	Brickworks in Zehdenick
650 mm	2 ft 1 19/32	Brazil	
650 mm	2 ft 1 19/32	Mozambique	
655 mm	2 ft 1 25/32 in	Germany	Schlebusch-Harkorter Coal Railway
660 mm	2 ft 2 in	Germany	Industrial and mine railways in Saarland and Rhineland-Palatinate
660 mm	2 ft 2 in	Japan	Yamanashi horse-drawn tramway
660 mm	2 ft 2 in	Wales	Cwt y Bugail quarry
686 mm	2 ft 3 in		See List of 2 ft 3 in gauge railways
693 mm	2 ft 3 9/32 in	Sweden	28 Swedish inches. Several railways.
700 mm	2 ft 3 9/16 in	Denmark	Common for sugar beet or sugar cane railways and peat railways. Hedeland veteran railway is preserved^{dk}.: Store Vildmose railway don't exist anymore, only a few materials and only one train remains for preservation on Hedeland veteran railway.; Stenvad Mosebrug (Stenvad Mosebrugscenter), Mosebrugsbanen peat museum railway is preserved.; Bunkermuseum Hanstholm museum (MuseumsCenter Hanstholm) railway is preserved.; Blovstrød Banen railway is preserved.; Lille Vildmose (Lille Vildmosecentret), Lille Vildmose Museum Center, Dokkedal railway is preserved.; Ree Park – America Expresses.; Østerbygård Dambrug is an active industrial railway.; Fuglsø mose is an active industrial railway.; Pindstrup Mosebrug is an active industrial railway.
700 mm	2 ft 3 9/16 in	England	Biwater Pipes and Castings
700 mm	2 ft 3 9/16 in	France	Chemin de fer forestier d'Abreschville
700 mm	2 ft 3 9/16 in	Hungary	Pálházi State Forest Railway (1888-1947, rebuilt to 760 mm)
700 mm	2 ft 3 9/16 in	Indonesia	Once used by 36 sugar mills in Java, only 23 still in use.
700 mm	2 ft 3 9/16 in	Latvia	Used in some peat railways
700 mm	2 ft 3 9/16 in	Netherlands	Used in industrial, peat, and field railways
700 mm	2 ft 3 9/16 in	St. Croix, US Virgin Islands	Bethlehem Old Work, U.S. Virgin Islands, Estate Bethlehem's Sugar Industry, St. Croix See also: Annaberg Historic District; Brown Bay, U.S. Virgin Islands; Catherineberg Sugar Mill Ruins; Cinnamon Bay Plantation; Coakley Bay Estate; Estate Carolina Sugar Plantation; Estate Grove Place; Estate Hogansborg; Estate Judith's Fancy; Estate Little Princess; Estate Saint George Historic District; Estate Rust Op Twist; Lameshur Plantation; Mafolie Great House; Mary Point Estate; Reef Bay Sugar Factory Historic District; Sion Hill, U.S. Virgin Islands; Sugar production in the Danish West Indies; Tutu Plantation House; Whim (United States Virgin Islands); Sugar plantations in the Caribbean; Danish West Indies; United States Virgin Islands; and History of the United States Virgin Islands
711 mm	2 ft 4 in	England	Snailbeach District Railways
716 mm	2 ft 4 3/16 in	Poland	Dobre Aleksandrowskie – Kruszwica railway (operating tourist railway)
724 mm	2 ft 4 1/2 in	Wales	Guest Keen Baldwins Iron and Steel Company Ltd.: Briton Ferry Steelworks, Glyn Valley Tramway
737 mm	2 ft 5 in	England	St. Michael's Mount Tramway
740 mm	2 ft 5 1/8 in	Luxembourg	Minière et Métallurgique de Rodange mine railway
750 mm	2 ft 5 1/2 in		See 750 mm gauge railways
750 mm	2 ft 5 1/2 in	Denmark	Rømø Tramway, which transported tourists across the island from 1899 to 1940.
760 mm	2 ft 5 15/16 in	Bulgaria	Origin: 1/2 Austrian fathom See Bosnian gauge Bosnian-gauge railways Septemvri – Dobriniste narrow railway
760 mm	2 ft 5 15/16 in	Romania	Transylvanian mining railway
762 mm	2 ft 6 in		See 2 ft 6 in gauge railways
765 mm	2 ft 6 1/8 in	DR Congo	Matadi–Kinshasa Railway, converted to 3 ft 6 in (1,067 mm) 1925–1931.
765 mm	2 ft 6 1/8 in	Denmark	Found on the island of Fur at the Fur Museum.
775 mm	2 ft 6 1/2 in	England	Jee's Hartshill Granite Quarry
775 mm	2 ft 6 1/2 in	Germany	Bombergbahn, a funicular in Bad Pyrmont
785 mm	2 ft 6 29/32 in	Denmark	Hjerl Hede museum (Frilandsmuseum) peat railway is preserved, 785 mm 2 ft 6 29/32 in and 791 mm 2 ft 7 5/32 in gauges are both used on this railway.
785 mm	2 ft 6 29/32 in	Germany	Origin: 2 1/2 Prussian feet Bröl Valley Railway
785 mm	2 ft 6 29/32 in	Poland	Silesian Interurbans, Upper Silesian narrow gauge railways
791 mm	2 ft 7 5/32 in	Denmark	See Narrow-gauge railways in Denmark and Narrow-gauge railways in Europe. Faxe Jernbane in southern Zealand, 791 mm 2 ft 7 5/32 in and 785 mm 2 ft 6 29/32 in, 2 1/2 feet (785 mm) both gauges were used at Faxe Jernbane and Faxe limestone quarry, none remains, only a few materials and trains from Faxe Jernbane and Faxe limestone quarry remains for preservation on Hedeland veteran railway^{dk}.
800 mm	2 ft 7 1/2 in		See 800 mm gauge railways
800 mm	2 ft 7 1/2 in	Denmark	Used by the private Hydrema railway.
802 mm	2 ft 7 9/16 in	Sweden	Far behind 891 mm (2 ft 11 3/32 in), one of the most common narrow gauges in Sweden, for example the Hällefors–Fredriksberg Railways (1874–1970) in Värmland. Never formed much of a network, none remain.
813 mm	2 ft 8 in	England	Winnal Gasworks Railway
813 mm	2 ft 8 in	Wales	Rhosydd Quarry, a counterbalance weight for a 4 ft 8 1/2 in (1,435 mm) gauge incline;
820 mm	2 ft 8 9/32 in	Germany	Prince William Railway Company, Wuppertal-Vohwinkel–Essen-Überruhr railway, converted to standard gauge.
825 mm	2 ft 8 1/2 in	England	Brighton and Rottingdean Seashore Electric Railway (a vehicle that ran on two parallel 2 ft 8 1/2 in (825 mm) gauge tracks, billed as 18 ft (5.5 m) gauge), Furzebrook Railway and Volk's Electric Railway
838 mm	2 ft 9 in	England	Seaton Tramway, Volk's Electric Railway (former gauge)
838 mm	2 ft 9 in	Japan	Nankai Railway (former gauge, converted to 1,067 mm (3 ft 6 in gauge)
850 mm	2 ft 9 15/32 in	Denmark	A line with this gauge existed at the Fuglsø moor until the late 1960s.
850 mm	2 ft 9 15/32 in	Italy	Ponte Tresa-Luino (1924: converted to 1,100 mm (3 ft 7 5/16 in) gauge, 1950: closed) Menaggio–Porlezza railway (1939: closed)
860 mm	2 ft 9 7/8 in	Germany	Alsen´sche Portland-Cementfabrik KG in Itzehoe
876 mm	2 ft 10 1/2 in	England	Biwater Pipes and Castings Cattybrook Brickworks railway
880 mm	2 ft 10 21/32 in	Germany	Bayerisches Moor- und Torfmuseum, Peat museum (operating)
880 mm	2 ft 10 21/32 in	Norway	Industrial railway in Stokke
889 mm	2 ft 11 in	England	Miller Engineering & Construction Ltd. Sandiacre depot
889 mm	2 ft 11 in	Germany	Schlebusch-Harkorter Coal Railway
891 mm	2 ft 11 3/32 in	Sweden	3 Swedish feet See Swedish three-foot–gauge railways
900 mm	2 ft 11 7/16 in		See 900 mm gauge railways
914 mm	3 ft		See 3 ft gauge railways 3 ft gauge railways in the United Kingdom
925 mm	3 ft 13/32 in	Germany	Trams in Chemnitz, since in 1914
940 mm	3 ft 1 in	United States	La Salle Street Railroad
943 mm	3 ft 1 1/8 in	England	Central Electricity Generating Board Fawley Tunnel
946 mm	3 ft 1 1/4 in	Austria	Gletscherbahn Kaprun 2, a funicular partly inside a tunnel.
950 mm	3 ft 1 3/8 in	Eritrea	Eritrean Railway
950 mm	3 ft 1 3/8 in	Hungary	Zsuzsi Forest Railway (1882-1961, re-built to 760 mm)
950 mm	3 ft 1 3/8 in	Italy	Cagliari light rail, Circumvesuviana, Dolomites Railway, Ferrovia Circumetnea, Ferrovie della Sardegna, Metrosassari, Rome–Giardinetti railway, Rome–Fiuggi railway
950 mm	3 ft 1 3/8 in	Libya	Italian Libya Railways
950 mm	3 ft 1 3/8 in	Somalia	Mogadishu-Villabruzzi Railway
955 mm	3 ft 1 19/32 in	Switzerland	Polybahn funicular
965 mm	3 ft 2 in	England	Clifton Rocks Railway
965 mm	3 ft 2 in	United States	Birmingham Coal Company Railroad, Detroit, Bay City & Alpena Railroad, Keeling Coal Company, Trinidad Street Railway (Colorado), and Streetcars in Monterey (1891–1914)
972 mm	3 ft 2 1/4 in	England	Betchworth Quarry Railways
985 mm	3 ft 2 25/32 in	Switzerland	Zugerberg Funicular
991 mm	3 ft 3 in	United States	Tampa Street Railway
1,000 mm	3 ft 3 3/8 in		See metre-gauge railway
1,009 mm	3 ft 3 23/32 in	Bulgaria	Sofia Tramway
1,016 mm	3 ft 4 in	Scotland	Kilmarnock and Troon Railway
1,016 mm	3 ft 4 in	United States	Coal Hill Coal Railroad, Keeling Coal Company, Pittsburgh and Castle Shannon Plane, Pittsburgh and Castle Shannon Railroad
1,029 mm	3 ft 4 1/2 in	England	Herne Bay Pier Railway
1,030 mm	3 ft 4 9/16 in	Denmark	See Narrow-gauge railways in Denmark
1,035 mm	3 ft 4 3/4 in	England	Lake Lock Rail Road
1,040 mm	3 ft 5 in	Austria	Festungsbahn (Salzburg)
1,049 mm	3 ft 5 5/16 in , 3ft 5.3in	Japan	Mitake Tozan Funicular; Mitake Tozan Railway
1,050 mm	3 ft 5 11/32 in	Jordan	Hejaz railway
1,050 mm	3 ft 5 11/32 in	Syria	Hejaz railway
1,050 mm	3 ft 5 11/32 in	Lebanon and Syria	Former Beyrouth – Damascus Railway, in Lebanon mostly dismantled
1,050 mm	3 ft 5 11/32 in	Syria and Saudi Arabia	Hejaz railway (Damascus–Medina)
1,055 mm	3 ft 5 1/2 in	Algeria	National Company for Rail Transport
1,067 mm	3 ft 6 in		See 3 ft 6 in gauge railways Three-foot six-inch gauge railways in the United States
1,093 mm	3 ft 7 in	England	Middlesbrough Corporation Tramways, Middlesbrough, Stockton and Thornaby Electric Tramways Company and Swinefleet Works
1,093 mm	3 ft 7 in	Sweden	Köping–Uttersberg–Riddarhyttan Railway, 1864–1968. The gauge was by mistake.
1,093 mm	3 ft 7 in	USA	International Bridge and Tramway Company (Laredo, Texas)
1,099 mm	3 ft 7 1/4 in	Denmark	This measurement was observed at the old ferry berths in Helsingør.
1,099 mm	3 ft 7 1/4 in	Sweden	Christinehamn–Sjöändans järnväg 44 Swedish inches
1,100 mm	3 ft 7 5/16 in	Brazil	The Santa Teresa Tramway in Rio de Janeiro
1,100 mm	3 ft 7 5/16 in	Germany	Braunschweig tram system; tram systems in Kiel and Lübeck, closed
1,100 mm	3 ft 7 5/16 in	Italy	Former SVIE (Società Varesina per Impresse Electriche) network around Varese, circa 1903–1955
1,106 mm	3 ft 7 1/2 in	Austria	Horse-drawn railway from Gmunden in the Salzkammergut to Budweis, now in the Czech Republic; coal railways Thomasroith–Attnang and Breitenschützing–Kohlgrube. 3 Austrian Fuß (ft) 6 Zoll (inch)
1,118 mm	3 ft 8 in	United States	Bellaire Street Railroad Company; Gainesvllle Street Railway Company; Clinton and Lyons Horse Railway Company; Oakland, San Leandro and Haywards Electric Railway (until 1907), coal mines of the Monongahela River
1,130 mm	3 ft 8 1/2 in	England	London Pneumatic Despatch Company
1,143 mm	3 ft 9 in	England	Lynton and Lynmouth Cliff Railway, Saltburn Cliff Lift (until 1921)
1,143 mm	3 ft 9 in	United States	Larned Street Railway
1,151 mm	3 ft 9 5/16 in	Belgium	Used on line 59 between 1844 and 1897 when the line was privately operated.
1,156 mm	3 ft 9 1/2 in	United States	Arcata and Mad River Railroad, Northern Redwood Lumber Company
1,168 mm	3 ft 10 in	United States	El Conquistador Resort (Puerto Rico), Mechanicsburg and Buffalo Railway
1,188 mm	3 ft 10 25/32 in	Indonesia	Trams in Jakarta
1,188 mm	3 ft 10 25/32 in	Sweden	Engelsberg–Norberg Railway Åtvidaberg - Bersbo Railway Wessman - Barkens Railway
1,200 mm	3 ft 11 1/4 in	China	Chaoyang Commuter Rail, Chaoyang District, Shantou, China
1,200 mm	3 ft 11 1/4 in	Croatia	Funiculars: Zagreb Funicular, Zagreb
1,200 mm	3 ft 11 1/4 in	France	Funiculars: Funiculaire du Perce-Neige in Tignes, and Funival at Val-d'Isère
1,200 mm	3 ft 11 1/4 in	Germany	Funiculars: Schlossbergbahn (Freiburg), Freiburg im Breisgau in Baden-Württemberg
1,200 mm	3 ft 11 1/4 in	Italy	Funiculars: Central Funicular of the Naples Metro, Naples and Gardena Ronda Express in Val Gherdëina (South Tyrol)
1,200 mm	3 ft 11 1/4 in	Lithuania	Funiculars: Žaliakalnis Funicular, Kaunas and Gediminas Hill Lift, Gediminas Hill, Vilnius
1,200 mm	3 ft 11 1/4 in	Spain	Funiculars: Montjuïc Funicular, Barcelona and Larreineta funicular, Valle de Trápaga-Trapagaran
1,200 mm	3 ft 11 1/4 in	Switzerland	funiculars: Parsenn funicular at Davos 1,200 mm (3 ft 11 1/4 in) and 800 mm (2 ft 7 1/2 in); funiculars: St. Moritz–Corviglia funicular (lower section only of 436 metres (1,430 ft) route-length only – upper section is 1,440 mm (4 ft 8 11/16 in) gauge); funiculars: Thunersee–Beatenberg funicular in Bern canton; funiculars: Fribourg funicular in Fribourg; funiculars: Funiculaire Moléson-sur-Gruyères – Plan-Francey, Gruyères, Canton of Fribourg, Fribourg; funiculars: Tschuggen Express, Arosa, Graubünden; funiculars: Stoosbahn 1,435 mm (4 ft 8 1/2 in) and Old gauge 1,200 mm (3 ft 11 1/4 in) the original line; funiculars: Mühleggbahn, St. Gallen; funiculars: Funiculaire St-Luc – Tignousa, Anniviers, Valais; rack railways: Rheineck–Walzenhausen mountain railway (part of St. Gallen S-Bahn)
1,200 mm	3 ft 11 1/4 in	Ukraine	Funiculars: Kyiv Funicular, Kyiv
1,217 mm	3 ft 11 29/32 in	Sweden	Four lines, all converted to standard gauge before 1900, still in use. 1217 mm is based on Swedish feet but compatible with locomotives of 1,219 mm (4 ft). See:Narrow-gauge railways in Sweden
1,219 mm	4 ft	England	Furzebrook Railway (c.1830–1957), Redruth and Chasewater Railway 1826–1915, Bradford Corporation Tramways, Keighley Tramway and a cluster in the NW of England
1,219 mm	4 ft	Isle of Man	First Falcon Cliff lift (closed 1896), Port Soderick Cliff Lift, (closed 1939), Douglas Head Funicular Railway (closed 1953)
1,219 mm	4 ft	New Zealand	Wellington tramway system: electric trams, closed 1964.
1,219 mm	4 ft	Scotland	Falkirk and District Tramways (1905–1936), Glasgow Subway
1,219 mm	4 ft	United States	Former tram systems in Canton, Ohio; Honolulu, Hawaii; Laredo, Texas; Pueblo, Colorado; San Antonio, Texas; Sioux City, Iowa; Athens Railway Company (Georgia), Canton and Massillon Electric Railway; Citizens Street Railway (Danville, OH), Logansport Railway, Madison Street Railway (Indiana), Washington Street and State Asylum Railroad
1,219 mm	4 ft	Wales	Padarn Railway (1842–1961), Saundersfoot Railway (1829–1939)
1,245 mm	4 ft 1 in	England	Middleton Railway, converted to standard gauge after 1881
1,245 mm	4 ft 1 in	United States	Hecla and Torch Lake Railroad, Corrigan Consolidated Street Railway, Lawrence Transportation Company, Lexington Street Railroad, Clinton Street Railway (Missourri)
1,270 mm	4 ft 2 in	England	Surrey Iron Railway
1,270 mm	4 ft 2 in	United States	Brooklyn Heights Railway, St. Cloud Street Railway
1,270 mm	4 ft 2 in	Wales	Merthyr Tramroad, Rumney Railway
1,283 mm	4 ft 2 1/2 in	England	Saltburn Cliff Lift (from 1922)
1,283 mm	4 ft 2 1/2 in	United States	Red Oak Street Railroad
1,295 mm	4 ft 3 in	United States	Delaware and Hudson Canal Company Gravity Railroad, Delaware and Hudson Railway and Haytor Granite Tramway
1,300 mm	4 ft 3 3/16 in	Austria	Reisszug (Salzburg, Austria)
1,300 mm	4 ft 3 3/16 in	France	Funiculars of Lyon (Lyon, France)
1,321 mm	4 ft 4 in	England	Mansfield and Pinxton Railway
1,321 mm	4 ft 4 in	United States	Lexington and Kansas City Land and Investment Company, Redlands Street Railway, Shreveport City Railroad
1,321 mm	4 ft 4 in	Wales	Monmouthshire Railway and Canal Company (Newport and Pontypool Railway)
1,333 mm	4 ft 4 1/2 in	England	Belvoir Castle tramway
1,333 mm	4 ft 4 1/2 in	United States	Haverhlll and Groveland Street Railway
1,350 mm	4 ft 5 5/32 in	Brazil	Santos tramways (closed 1971) and later Santos heritage tramways (1984–86 and 2000–present)
1,372 mm	4 ft 6 in		See 4 ft 6 in gauge railway
1,372 mm	4 ft 6 in	United States	Grand Island Street Railway, Riverside and Arlington Street Railway
1,384 mm	4 ft 6 1/2 in	Scotland	various railways in Scotland prior to 1840
1,397 mm	4 ft 7 in	United States	North Hudson County Railway, Detroit City Railway (until 1870)
1,397 mm	4 ft 7 in	Wales	Duffryn Llynvi and Porthcawl Railway
1,416 mm	4 ft 7 3/4 in	England	Huddersfield Corporation Tramways
1,416 mm	4 ft 7 3/4 in	Scotland	List of town tramway systems in Scotland
1,422 mm	4 ft 8 in	United States	Centreville Military Railroad; Green Mountain Cog Railway; Manassas Gap Railroad; Mount Washington Cog Railway
1,422 mm	4 ft 8 in	England	prior to 1846 (proto standard gauge)
1,429 mm	4 ft 8 1/4 in	United States	Washington Metro, Washington Metro rolling stock
1,432 mm	4 ft 8 3/8 in	Hong Kong	Disneyland Resort line, Island line (excluding West Island line), Kwun Tong line (excluding Kwun Tong line extension), Tseung Kwan O line, Tsuen Wan line, Tung Chung line
1,432 mm	4 ft 8 3/8 in	Bucharest, Romania	Bucharest Metro

=== Standard gauge ===
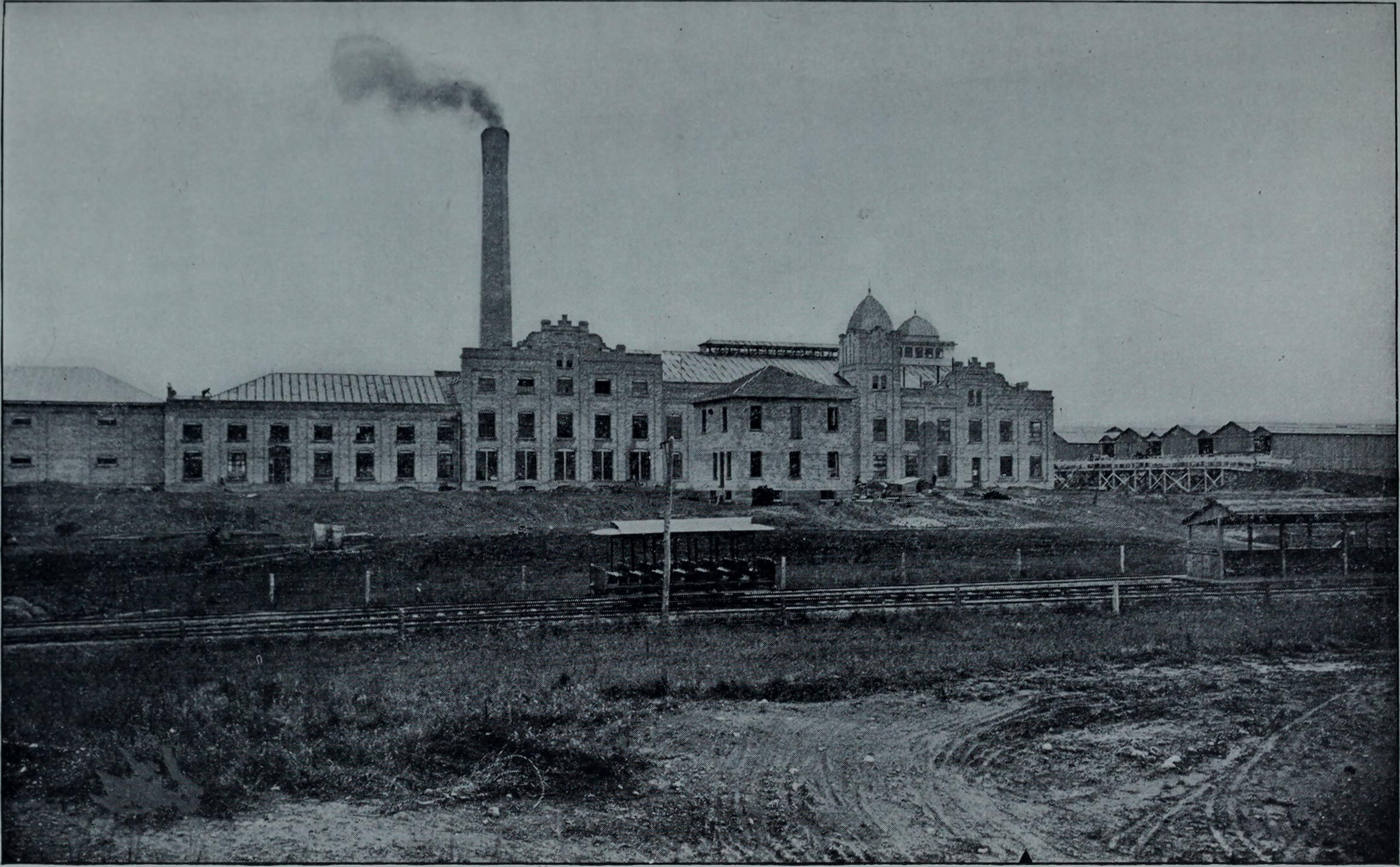
The Factory of the Ontario Sugar Co., Berlin, Ontario with a Standard gauge railway.

Gauge		Country or Region	Notes
Metric	Imperial	Country or Region	Notes
1,435 mm	4 ft 8 1/2 in	Global	The most widely-used gauge: about 60% of the world's railway mileage is standard gauge.

=== Broad gauge ===
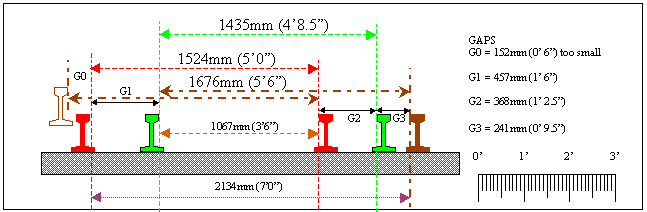
Five collocated track gauges

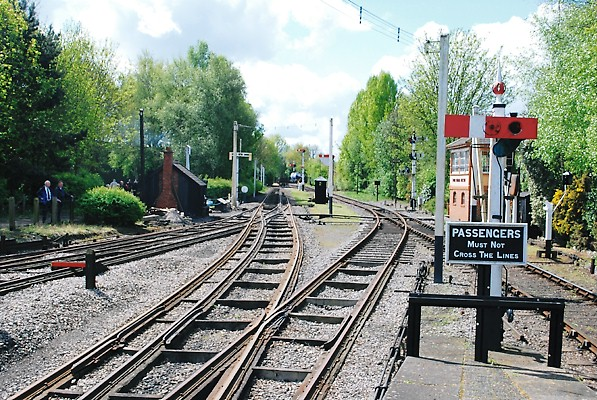
Broad-gauge and standard-gauge track at Didcot

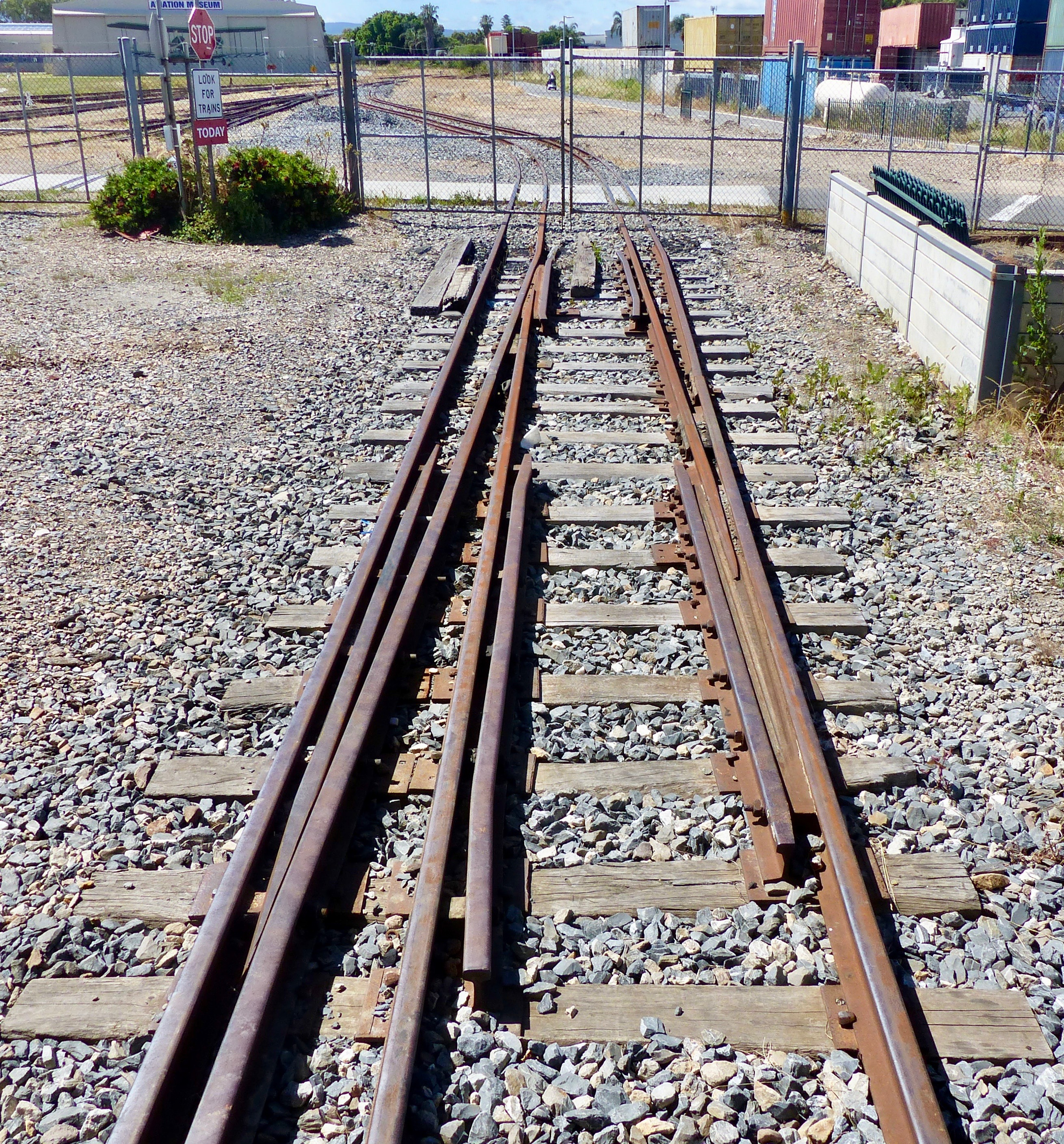
South Australian Railways triple-gauge change-over trackwork, from one common rail to NG in middle

Gauge		Country or Region	Notes
Metric	Imperial	Country or Region	Notes
1,440 mm	4 ft 8 11/16 in	Austria	Hungerburgbahn, Hungerburg, Innsbruck, Tyrol. 1,440 mm (4 ft 8 11/16 in) (2007-) Old track gauge 1,000 mm (3 ft 3 3/8 in) (1906-2005)
1,440 mm	4 ft 8 11/16 in	France	Bellevue funicular
1,440 mm	4 ft 8 11/16 in	Switzerland	St. Moritz–Corviglia funicular (upper section of 1,616 metres or 5,302 feet route-length only – lower section is 1,200 mm (3 ft 11 1/4 in) gauge)
1,441 mm	4 ft 8 23/32 in	Denmark	The first railway in Denmark
1,445 mm	4 ft 8 7/8 in	Italy	Tramway networks in Milan, Turin and Rome; Orvieto Funicular; railway network until 1930.
1,445 mm	4 ft 8 7/8 in	Spain	Madrid Metro
1,448 mm	4 ft 9 in	England	Manchester and Leeds Railway
1,448 mm	4 ft 9 in	United States	Pennsylvania Railroad (until c. 1910s), Danville, Hazleton and Wilkes-Barre Railroad, Strasburg Rail Road (converted to standard gauge).
1,450 mm	4 ft 9 3/32 in	Germany	Dresdner Verkehrsbetriebe AG, Trams in Dresden
1,458 mm	4 ft 9 13/32 in	Germany	Trams in Leipzig
1,460 mm	4 ft 9 1/2 in	United States	Ohio divisions of the Pennsylvania Railroad, Citizens' Railroad Company (St. Louis, Missouri), Cass Avenue & Fair Ground Railway
1,473 mm	4 ft 10 in	United States	The Midwest, until after the Civil War (Ohio gauge); Streetcars in St. Louis; Norwalk Horse Railroad
1,473 mm	4 ft 10 in	Wales	Funiculars: Aberystwyth Cliff Railway, Aberystwyth
1,486 mm	4 ft 10 1/2 in	United States	St. Louis Cable and Western Railway
1,492 mm	4 ft 10 3/4 in	Canada	Toronto Suburban Railway from 1891–1917. 4 ft 8 1/2 in (1,435 mm) until the end at 1931
1,495 mm	4 ft 10 7/8 in	Canada	Toronto gauge: Halton County Radial Railway, Toronto streetcar system, and Toronto subway (Lines 1, 2, and 4)
1,499 mm	4 ft 11 in	United States	New Albany Railway
1,520 mm	4 ft 11 27/32 in	Finland	Also named Russian gauge. See 5 ft and 1520 mm gauge railways
1,520 mm	4 ft 11 27/32 in	Former USSR	Also named Russian gauge. See 5 ft and 1520 mm gauge railways
1,520 mm	4 ft 11 27/32 in	Hong Kong	Peak Tram See 5 ft and 1520 mm gauge railways
1,522 mm	4 ft 11 29/32 in	Finland	Helsinki Metro
1,524 mm	5 ft	England	Funiculars: East Hill Cliff Railway
1,524 mm	5 ft	Finland	In 1862 the first railway connection in Grand Duchy of Finland were built with five-foot railway gauge, however that gauge was first introduced in United Kingdom.
1,524 mm	5 ft	Isle of Man	Funiculars: Laxey Browside Tramway
1,524 mm	5 ft	Russia	Also named Russian gauge. See 5 ft and 1520 mm gauge railways
1,524 mm	5 ft	Spain	Funiculars: Sant Joan Funicular, Montserrat, near Barcelona
1,524 mm	5 ft	United States	Some funiculars in Pittsburgh: Duquesne Incline, Monongahela Incline, Nunnery Hill Incline. Also, many Confederate railroads.
1,537 mm	5 ft 1/2 in	England	London and Blackwall Railway 1840–1849, converted to standard gauge
1,549 mm	5 ft 1 in	United States	Horsecar lines in Camden, New Jersey; Lynchburg Street Railway Company (Virginia); Union Springs Street Car Company
1,575 mm	5 ft 2 in	Spain	Ferrocarril de Langreo
1,575 mm	5 ft 2 in	United States	Columbus Ohio streetcars
1,581 mm	5 ft 2 1/4 in	United States	Southeastern Pennsylvania Transportation Authority (SEPTA), Philadelphia
1,588 mm	5 ft 2 1/2 in	United States	Pennsylvania trolley gauge
1,591 mm	5 ft 2 5/8 in	United States	New Orleans City and Lake Railroad, St. Charles Street Railroad
1,600 mm	5 ft 3 in	Australia	States of Victoria and South Australia
1,600 mm	5 ft 3 in	Brazil	São Paulo Railway Company, States of Rio de Janeiro, São Paulo and Minas Gerais
1,600 mm	5 ft 3 in	Germany	Grand Duchy of Baden State Railway 1840-1854, converted to standard gauge
1,600 mm	5 ft 3 in	Ireland	See 5 ft 3 in gauge railways.
1,600 mm	5 ft 3 in	Switzerland	Funiculars: Caumasee-Lift, Flims, Graubünden; Funiculars: Fun'ambule, Neuchâtel, Canton of Neuchâtel
1,600 mm	5 ft 3 in	United States	Streetcars in Altoona, Pennsylvania: Funiculars: Mount Oliver Incline, South Side, Pittsburgh, Pennsylvania
1,613 mm	5 ft 3 1/2 in	United States	Sacramento Valley Railroad (1852–77)
1,620 mm	5 ft 3 25/32 in	South Korea	U Line
1,626 mm	5 ft 4 in	United States	Early railrooads in Ohio, Brownstown and Ewing Street Railroad
1,638 mm	5 ft 4 1/2 in	United States	Baltimore, Baltimore Streetcar System (defunct) and Baltimore Streetcar Museum (operating)
1,664 mm	5 ft 5 1/2 in	Portugal	5 Portuguese feet Converted to 1,668 mm from 1955
1,668 mm	5 ft 5 21/32 in		See Iberian gauge.
1,672 mm	5 ft 5 13/16 in	Spain	6 Castilian feet Spanish national rail network Converted to 1,668 mm (5 ft 5 21/32 in) Iberian gauge from 1955; The current Barcelona metro line 1 and Cercanías Málaga.
1,676 mm	5 ft 6 in	England	Funiculars: East Cliff Railway, East Cliff, Bournemouth; Funiculars: West Cliff Railway, West Cliff, Bournemouth
1,676 mm	5 ft 6 in	India	See 5 ft 6 in gauge railway
1,676 mm	5 ft 6 in	Spain	See Rail transport in Spain
1,676 mm	5 ft 6 in	United States	Bay Area Rapid Transit (excluding eBART and OAK Airport line); Some lines in New England were built to this gauge including Androscoggin (until 1861), Maine Central (until 1871), Vermont Central (until 1870s), Grand Trunk (until 1877), Buckfield Branch / Portland & Oxford Central (until 1878), European & North American (until 1877), and Bangor & Piscataquis (until 1877).
1,676 mm	5 ft 6 in	Wales	Funiculars: Centre for Alternative Technology Railway, Powys
1,700 mm	5 ft 6 15/16 in	South Korea	Busan Metro Line 4, Sillim Line
1,727 mm	5 ft 8 in	England	Babbacombe Cliff Railway and Fisherman's Walk Cliff Railway
1,727 mm	5 ft 8 in	United States	Central City Horse Railway (Peoria, Illinois), St. Clair Incline (South Side Slopes, Pittsburgh, Pennsylvania)
1,740 mm	5 ft 8 1/2 in	United States	Gualala River Railroad
1,750 mm	5 ft 8 7/8 in	France	Ligne de Sceaux Paris to Limours via Saint-Rémy-lès-Chevreuse, until 1891
1,800 mm	5 ft 10 7/8 in	Germany	Oberweißbacher Bergbahn (funicular section only)
1,800 mm	5 ft 10 7/8 in	Switzerland	Standseilbahn Linth-Limmern, Linthal, Glarus, Glarus
1,800 mm	5 ft 10 7/8 in	United States	Hogwarts Express (located in Universal Orlando Resort)
1,829 mm	6 ft	England	Funiculars: West Hill Cliff Railway
1,829 mm	6 ft	India	In the 19th century, engineers considered this gauge but finally settled on 5 ft 6 in (1,676 mm)
1,829 mm	6 ft	Russia	Saint Petersburg – Tsarskoe Selo Railways, 1837–1897
1,829 mm	6 ft	United States	Albany and Susquehanna Railroad, Erie Railroad until June 22, 1880, Delaware, Lackawanna and Western Railroad March–May 1876, Predominant gauge used by railroads along southern tier of New York State that connected to the pioneering Erie Railroad. Most lines converted to standard gauge 1876–1880, along with the Erie.
1,850 mm	6 ft 27/32 in	Canada	Falls Incline Railway in the city of Niagara Falls, Ontario: Hornblower Niagara Funicular; Mount Royal Funicular Railway; Old Quebec Funicular; See Incline railways at Niagara Falls
1,880 mm	6 ft 2 in	Ireland	Ulster Railway, 1839–1846, re-gauged to 5 ft 3 in (1,600 mm)
1,880 mm	6 ft 2 in	Japan	SCMaglev train depots for Chuo Shinkansen.
1,880 mm	6 ft 2 in	Taiwan	Taipei Metro medium-capacity rubber-tired trains (with 1,435 mm (4 ft 8 1/2 in) rails)
1,945 mm	6 ft 4 9/16 in	Netherlands	Hollandsche IJzeren Spoorweg-Maatschappij, 1839–1866 De Arend (locomotive)
1,980 mm / 1,981 mm	6 ft 6 in	England	North Cliff Lift, Scarborough 1,981 mm 6ft 5.99in
1,980 mm / 1,981 mm	6 ft 6 in	Israel	Haifa, Carmelit subway railway line – Funicular 1,980 mm 6 ft 6 in
2,000 mm	6 ft 6 3/4 in	Scotland	Cairngorm Mountain Railway – Funicular
2,134 mm	7 ft	England	Original definition of Brunel's broad gauge. This rail gauge was soon changed to 7 ft 1/4 in (2,140 mm) to ease running in curves.
2,140 mm	7 ft 1/4 in	England	Brunel's Great Western Railway until converted to standard gauge by May 1892, See Great Western Railway The "gauge war". Also, harbour railways at the Isle of Portland and Brixham
2,140 mm	7 ft 1/4 in	Isle of Man	Port Erin Breakwater Railway
2,140 mm	7 ft 1/4 in	Portugal (Azores)	Ponta Delgada and Horta harbour (using rolling stock from Holyhead harbour)
2,140 mm	7 ft 1/4 in	South Africa	East London and Table Bay harbour railways
2,140 mm	7 ft 1/4 in	Wales	Holyhead harbour railway
2,286 mm	7 ft 6 in	England	St Nicholas Cliff Lift, Scarborough
2,440 mm	8 ft	United States	Johnstown Inclined Plane, Johnstown, Pennsylvania
2,642 mm	8 ft 8 in	China	Guangzhou Metro APM Line (uses the Bombardier Innovia APM 100)
2,743 mm	9 ft	Japan	Lake Biwa Canal, an inclined plane near Kyoto
2,743 mm	9 ft	United States	Knoxville Incline, Pittsburgh, Pennsylvania
3,000 mm	9 ft 10 1/8 in	Nazi Germany	The never-built Breitspurbahn, which had been originally proposed to run on a 4,000 mm (13 ft 1+1/2 in) track.
3,048 mm	10 ft	United States	Fort Pitt Incline, Penn Incline, Monongahela Freight Incline and Castle Shannon Incline, Pittsburgh
3,270 mm	10 ft 8 3/4 in	Poland	Elbląg Canal, Buczyniec, Warmian–Masurian Voivodeship.
3,327 mm	10 ft 11 in	Scotland	Dalzell Iron and Steel Works, Motherwell, Lanarkshire.
3,600 mm	11 ft 9 23/32 in	Austria	To transport material for the construction of Mooserboden and Wasserfallboden reservoirs. See Waagner-Biro; Lärchwandschrägaufzug.
4,572 mm	15 ft	Hassel Island, U.S. Virgin Islands	Creque Marine Railway.
5,486 mm	17 ft 11 31/32 in	England	Magnus Volk's Brighton and Rottingdean Seashore Electric Railway, The railway itself consisted of two parallel 2 ft 8 1/2 in (825 mm) gauge tracks, billed as 18 ft (5,486 mm) gauge.
6,000 mm	19 ft 8 7/32 in	Denmark	Esbjerg Harbor. Shipyards (Svendborg, Nakskov, etc.)
8,200 mm	26 ft 10 27/32 in	Austria	Lärchwandschrägaufzug See Waagner-Biro
9,000 mm	29 ft 6 5/16 in	Russia	Krasnoyarsk ship lift The base of the platform of the elevator car is 9 by 5.40 m (29 ft 6+3/8 in by 17 ft 8+5/8 in). See Lärchwandschrägaufzug

== See also ==
- Cable railway
- Cable car (railway)
- Canal inclined plane
- Ceremonial ship launching
- Funicular
- Inclined elevator
- Inclined railway
- List of airport people mover systems
- List of boat lifts
- List of funicular railways
- List of heritage railways
- List of inclined elevators
- List of monorail systems
- List of rack railways
- List of tram track gauges
- Loading gauge
- Minimum-gauge railway
- Monorail
- Mountain railway
- Patent slip
- Portage railway
- Rack railway
- Ship cradle
- Shiplift
- Slope car
- Suspension railway
- Rail transport
- Rapid transit track gauge
- Transrapid
