= Transport in the Isle of Man =

There are a number of transport services around the Isle of Man, mostly consisting of paved roads, public transport, rail services, sea ports and an airport.

== Roads ==
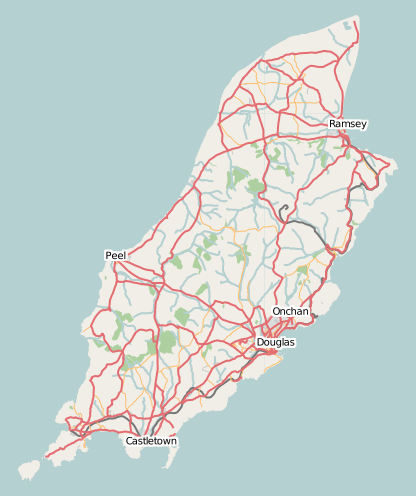
Overview map of transport links in the Isle of Man

The island has a total of 688 miles (1,107 km) of public roads, all of which are paved. Roads are numbered using a numbering scheme similar to the numbering schemes of Great Britain and Northern Ireland; each road is assigned a letter, which represents the road's category, followed by a 1 or 2 digit number. A roads are the main roads of the island whilst roads labelled B, C, D or U decrease in size and/or quality. (The C, D and U numbers are not marked on most maps or on signposts.) There is no national speed limit – some roads may be driven at any speed which is safe and appropriate. Careless and dangerous driving laws still apply, so one may not drive at absolutely any speed, and there are local speed limits on many roads. Many unrestricted roads have frequent bends which even the most experienced driver cannot see round. Drivers are limited to 50 miles per hour (80 km/h) in the first full year after passing their driving test (Isle of Man citizens are permitted to start driving at the age of sixteen) and some are not used to having to make progress in the same way as on a larger road network such as that in the UK: even a cautious driver can get from anywhere in the island to anywhere else in no more than sixty minutes.

Set against this is a strong culture of motor sport enthusiasm (pinnacled in the TT, but there are many events during the year) and many residents familiar with the roads are well used to traversing country roads at speeds illegal on similar roads elsewhere. This leads to a very diverse spread of both driving competence and speed. In an official survey in 2006 the introduction of blanket speed limits was refused by the population, suggesting that a large number appreciate the freedom.

There is a comprehensive bus network, operated by Bus Vannin, a department of the Isle of Man Government, with most routes originating or terminating in Douglas.

An organisation on the Isle of Man called the Fare Free Campaign supports making bus and tram travel on the island free of charge for all routes. One of the reasons the campaign gives for supporting this is to encourage people to change their transportation habits to help mitigate climate change. The Isle of Man Green Party supports making bus travel free, saying it would enable "low-income earners to access more job and training opportunities across the Isle of Man".

== Railways ==
The island has a total of 68.5 km (42.6 mi) of railway. There are seven separate public rail or tram systems on the island:

| Railway | Location | Approx. length (km) | Track | Main propulsion method | Gauge (inches) | Operation (days per week) (Seasonal) | Operated by |
|---|---|---|---|---|---|---|---|
| Isle of Man Railway | Douglas - Port Erin | 25 | Single | Steam | 36 | 7 | Department of Infrastructure |
| Manx Electric Railway | Douglas - Ramsey | 27 | Double | Electric | 36 | 7 | Department of Infrastructure |
| Snaefell Mountain Railway | Laxey - Snaefell Summit | 8 | Double | Electric | 42 | 7 | Department of Infrastructure |
| Douglas Horse Tram | Douglas Promenade | 3^{a} | Double^{a} | Equine | 36 | 7 | Douglas City Council |
| Groudle Glen Railway | Groudle Glen, Lonan and Onchan | 1 | Single | Steam | 24 | 1 or 2 | Groudle Glen Railway (2012) Limited |
| Great Laxey Mine Railway | Laxey | 0.4 | Single | Steam | 19 | 1 | Laxey & Lonan Heritage Trust |
| Orchid Line | Curraghs Wildlife Park, Ballaugh | 0.6 | Single | Steam | 3 1/2, 5, 7 1/4 | 1 | Manx Steam & Model Engineering Club |

^{a} Reopened 2022, on a shortened route with its western terminus at Broadway.

(The last three are short-distance tourist rides which cannot be said to be transport services.)

In addition, in 2025 a short length of tramway on the Queen's Pier, Ramsey was partly reopened.

All of these routes are seasonal.

== Airports ==
The only commercial airport on the island is the Isle of Man Airport at Ronaldsway. Scheduled services operate to and from various cities in the United Kingdom and Ireland, operated by several different airlines.

The island's other paved runways are at Jurby and Andreas. Jurby remains in Isle of Man Government ownership and is used for motorsport events and, previously, airshows, while Andreas is privately owned and used by a local glider club. The old Hall Caine Airport, a grass field near Ramsey, is no longer used.

== Aircraft Register ==
The Isle of Man Aircraft Register became operational on 1 May 2007. The register is open to all non-commercial aircraft and is intended to be of particular interest to professionally flown corporate operators. As of August 2025 a total of 1404 corporate and private aircraft had been registered.

== Ports and harbours ==
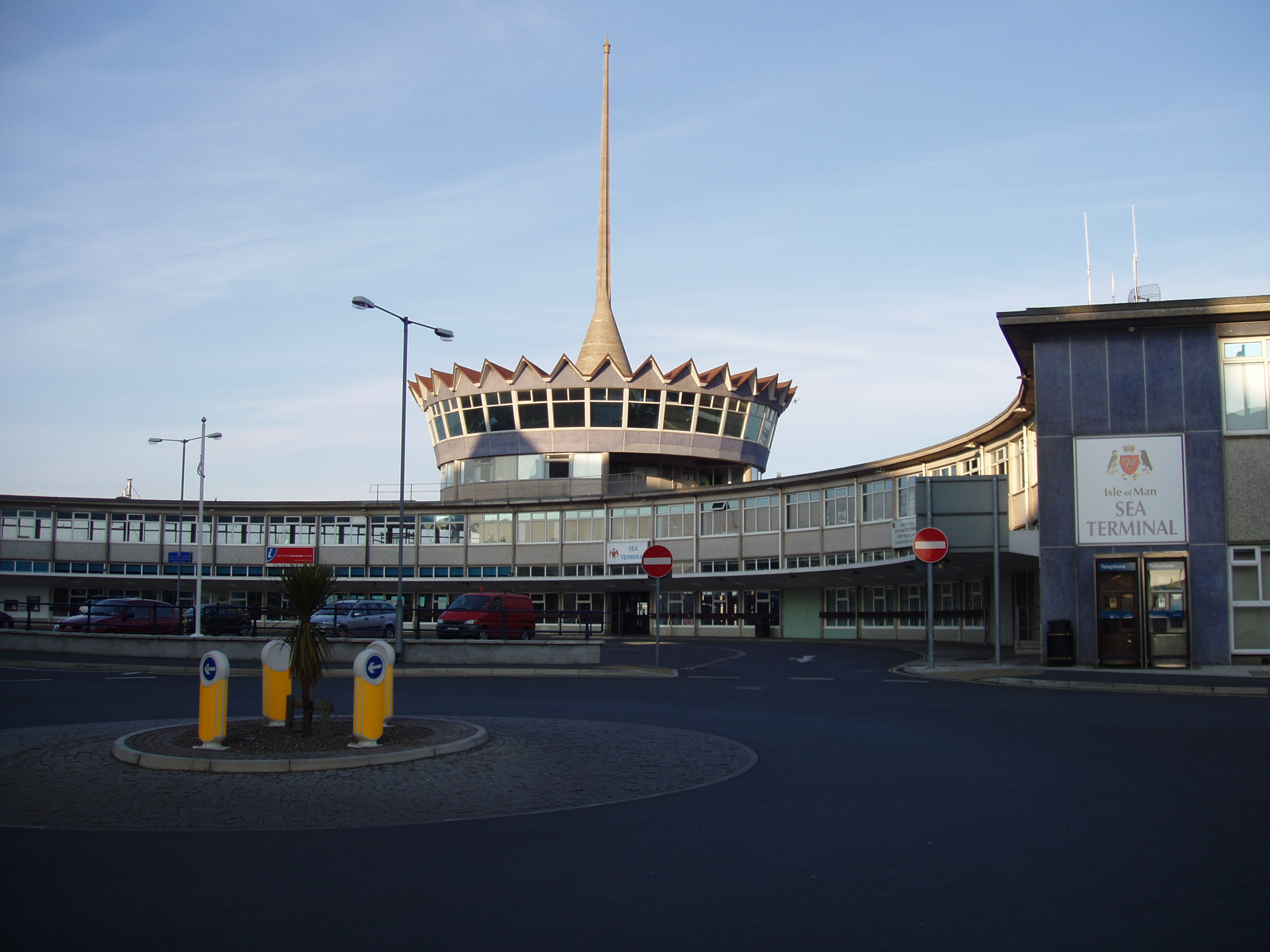
Isle of Man Sea Terminal at Douglas Harbour

There are ports at Castletown, Douglas, Peel, Port St Mary and Ramsey. Douglas is served by frequent ferries to/from England and occasional ferries to/from Ireland; the sole operator is the Isle of Man Steam Packet Company, with exclusive use of the Isle of Man Sea Terminal and the Douglas port linkspans under the conditions of the user agreement with the Isle of Man Government.

== Merchant marine ==
The Isle of Man register comprised 404 merchant ships of 1,000 GT or over at the end of 2017.
