= Lärchwandschrägaufzug =

Austrian broad-gauge inclined elevator

Coordinates: 47.2059°N 12.7192°E

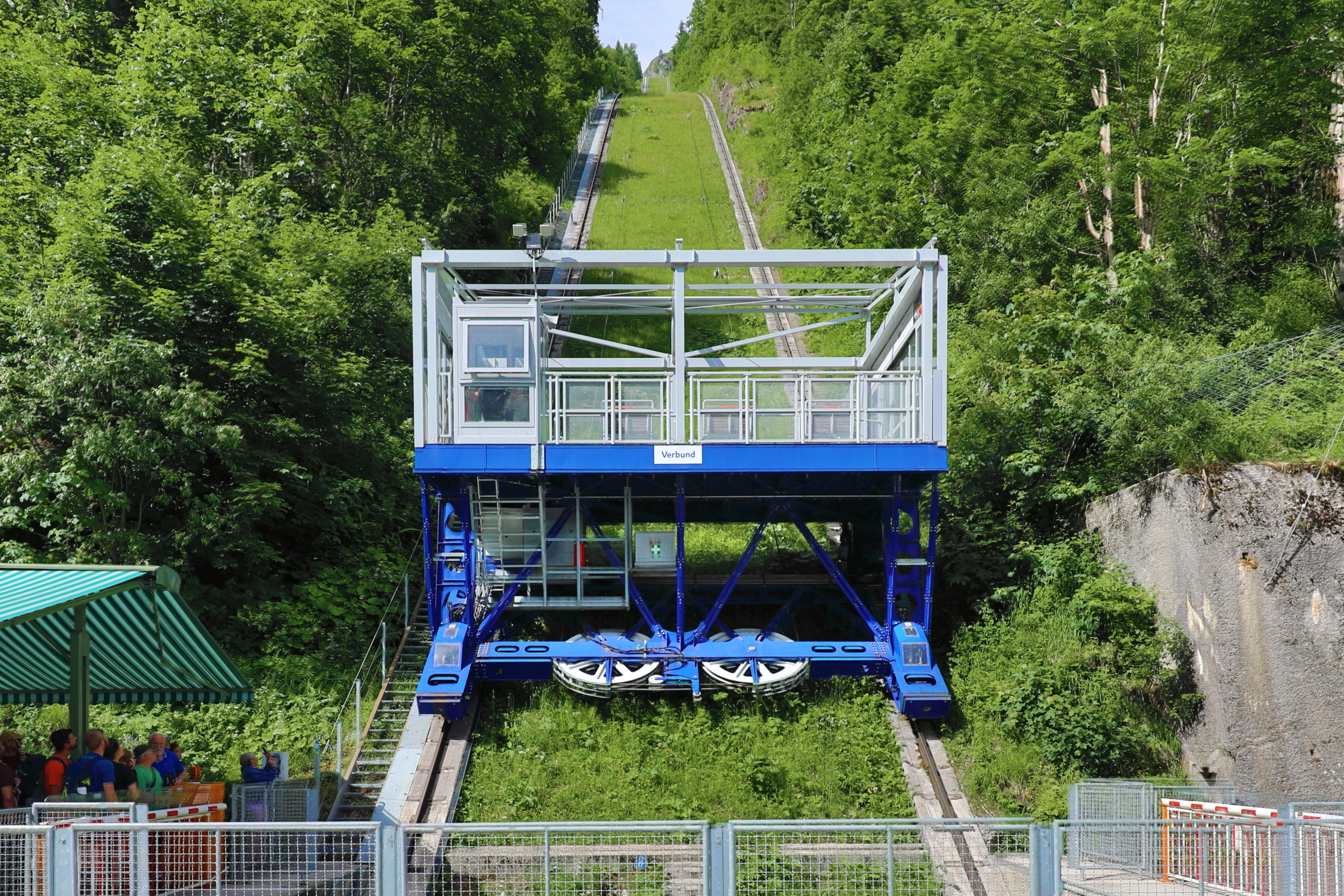
The Lärchwandschrägaufzug

The Lärchwandschrägaufzug is an incline elevator (inclinator) that is located in the High Tauern National Park, Kaprun, Austria.

== Technical features ==
The lift was first constructed in 1941 by Waagner-Biro with an initial track gauge of 3,600 mm (11 ft 9 23/32 in) to transport material for the construction of Mooserboden and Wasserfallboden reservoirs. In 1952 it was rebuilt with the current gauge. It is also used to transport people, mostly tourists.

With a gauge of 8,200 mm (26 ft 10 27/32 in), and a track length of 431 metres (1,414 ft), it is the largest inclined lift in Europe. It is also the second-widest gauge railway in the world, second only to Krasnoyarsk Dam railway which has a gauge of 9,000 mm (29 ft 6 5/16 in). The base of the platform of the elevator car is 9 by 5.40 m (29 ft 6 3/8 in by 17 ft 8 5/8 in).
