= Orchid Line =

Coordinates: 54.3178°N 4.5127°W

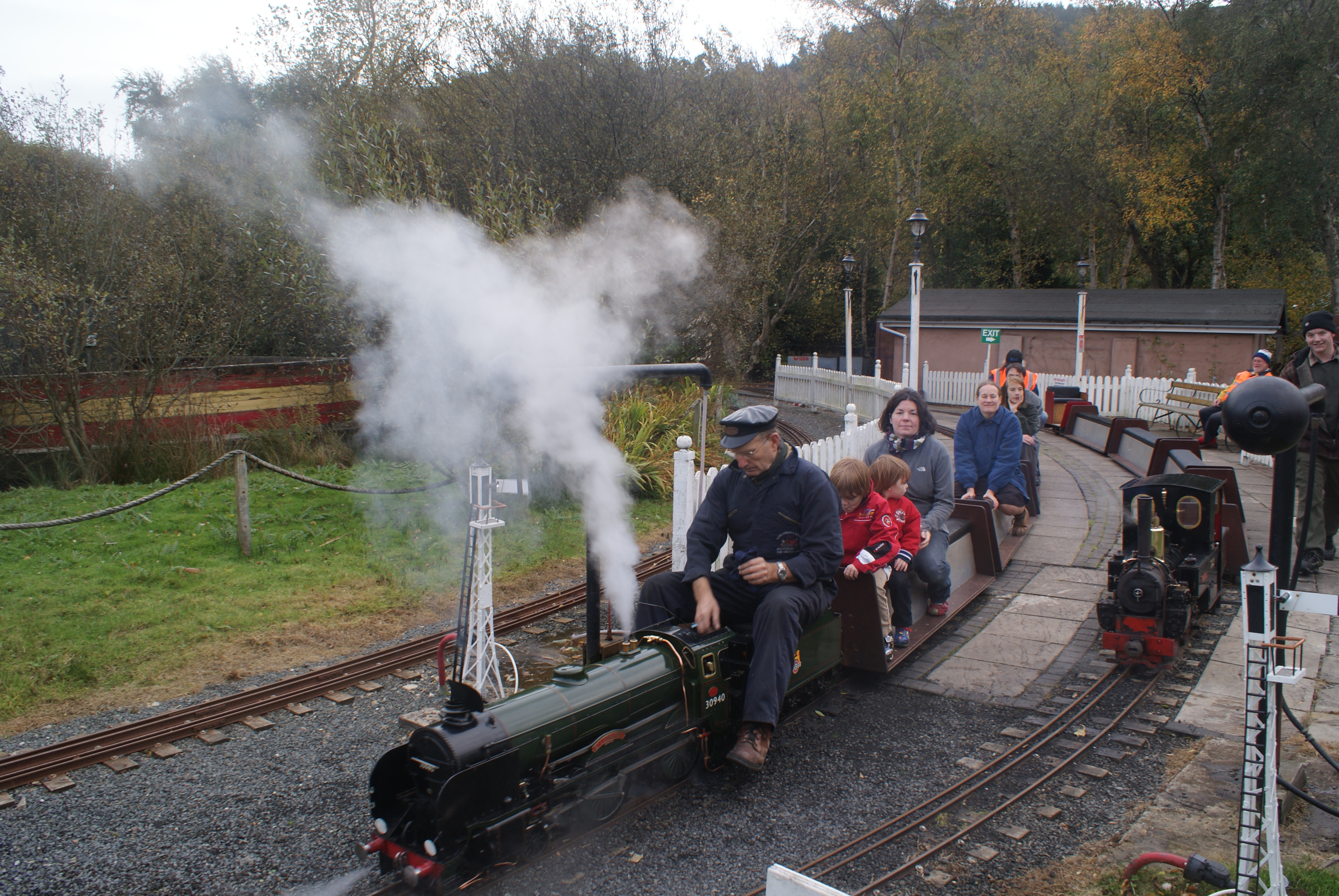
Train with model Southern Railway Schools class locomotive, awaiting departure

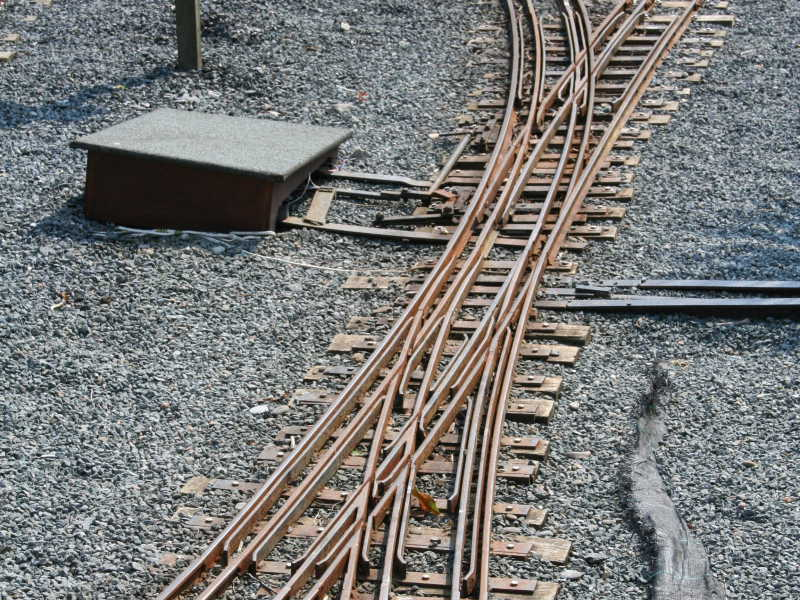
Triple-gauge pointwork

The Orchid Line is a multi-gauge miniature railway operating within the Curraghs Wildlife Park in the north of the Isle of Man and is operated by the Manx Model Engineering Society. It was opened in May 1992. The track combines up to three gauges, 3 1/2 inch, 5 inch and 7 1/4 inch.

== See also ==
- Transport on the Isle of Man
- Rail transport in the Isle of Man
- British narrow gauge railways

== Notes and references ==
- "orchidline". archive.mers.org.im.
