= Gardena Ronda Express =

Funicular in Italy

Coordinates: 46°33′36″N 11°42′17″E

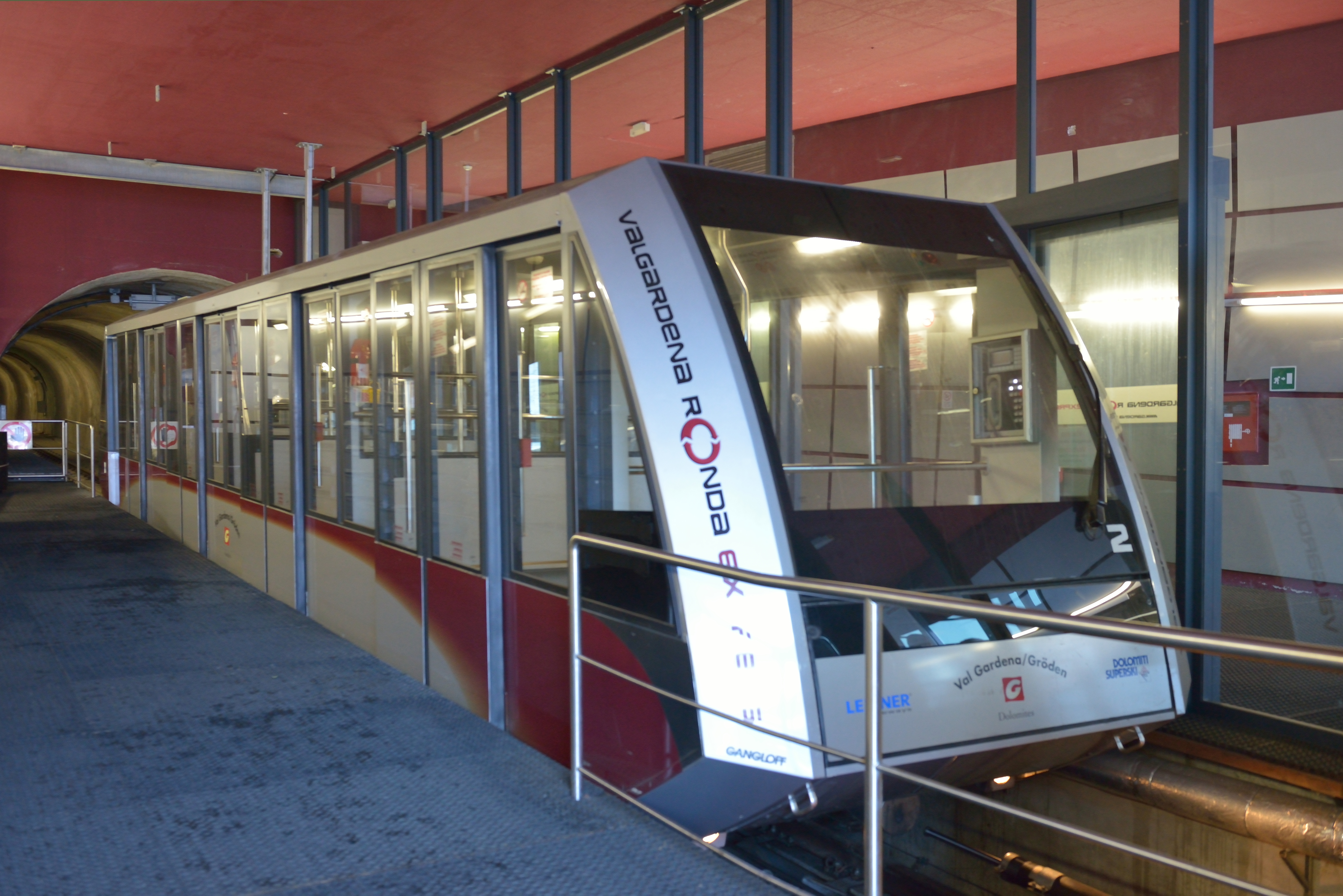

Overview
- Status: working
- Termini: Ruacia; Tschisles
- Stations: 2

Service
- Type: Funicular

History
- Opened: December 22, 2004

Technical
- Line length: 1.24 km (0.77 mi)
- Track gauge: 1,200 mm (3 ft 11 1/4 in)
- Electrification: yes
- Operating speed: 36 km/h (22 mph)

The Gardena Ronda Express is a funicular situated in the Val Gherdëina near Santa Cristina Gherdëina, connecting the Col Raiser lifts to the Sasslong/Ruacia and Ciampinoi lifts in northern Italy.

== Trains ==
Two funiculars operate on the system. Both were built by Gangloff, and the cable system was manufactured by Leitner Ropeways. The funicular trains each have four seating cabins capable of seating around 10 and standing around 25. The total capacity is 140 people per train. The trains are 15.5 m (50 ft 10 1/4 in) long and 2.3 m (7 ft 6 1/2 in) wide, and weigh 15,500 kg (34,200 lb).

== Track ==
The whole line runs in a tunnel, which connects two gondola lifts and through them two ski resorts. The maximum speed is 36 km/h (22 mph) and the slope is 100‰ (10%). 2000 persons can be transported per hour from one terminus to the other.

== History ==
Planning started in 1990 and after some changes on the track to avoid buildings, construction started in 2003. With the line's opening in 2004, after nearly forty years without a railway (the Val Gardena Railway was closed in 1960), the valley has a train again.

== See also ==
- List of funicular railways
