= St. Moritz–Corviglia Funicular =

Funicular in Engadin, Switzerland

Coordinates: 46.5018°N 9.8352°E

Standseilbahn St.Moritz–Corviglia
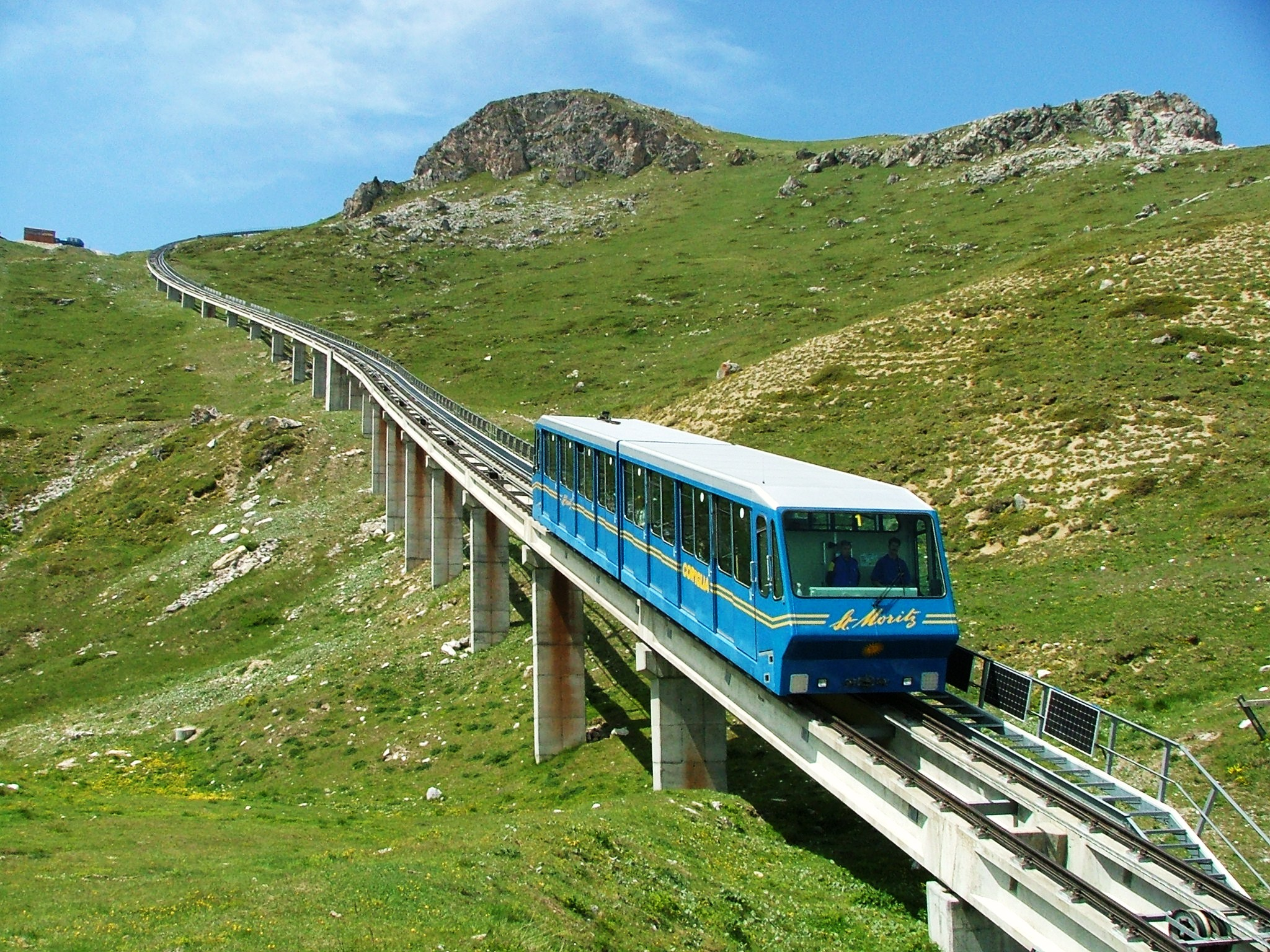

Overview
- Status: in operation
- Owner: Engadin St. Moritz Mountains AG; Aktiengesellschaft Drahtseilbahn St. Moritz-Chantarella in St. Moritz (1911-1938) and Aktien-Gesellschaft Drahtseilbahn Chantarella-Corviglia in St. Moritz (1928-1938); Gemeinde St. Moritz (in 1938)
- Locale: Engadin, Switzerland
- Termini: "St. Moritz (Standseilbahn)"; "Corviglia (Bergstation)"
- Stations: (including "Chantarella")
- Website: mountains.ch

Service
- Type: funicular with 2 sections
- Route number: 2970 (earlier: 1970)
- Operator(s): Engadin St. Moritz Mountains AG
- Rolling stock: 4 (2 per section)

History
- Opened: 2 January 1913; 112 years ago (first section); 19 December 1928 (second section)
- Concession: 1911, 1928, 1938

Technical
- Line length: 2,052 metres (6,732 ft)
- Track length: Lower section: 436 metres (1,430 ft); Upper section: 1,616 metres (5,302 ft)
- Track gauge: Lower section: 1,200 mm (3 ft 11 1/4 in); Upper section: 1,440 mm (4 ft 8 11/16 in)
- Electrification: from opening
- Highest elevation: 2,489 m (8,166 ft)
- Maximum incline: 45.6%
Route map
Map

The St. Moritz–Corviglia Funicular (German: Standseilbahn St. Moritz–Corviglia; STMC) is a funicular railway in the canton of Graubünden, Switzerland. The line links the town of St. Moritz at 1848 m with the Corviglia summit and ski area at 2489 m, and comprises two sections of differing gauge, with passengers changing cars at the intermediate station of Chantarella.

At Corviglia, the funicular connects with an aerial tramway to the summit of Piz Nair.

== Operation ==
The line is operated by the Oberengadiner Bergbahnen and has the following parameters:

Feature	Lower section	Upper section
Number of stops	2	2
Configuration	Single track with passing loop	Single track with passing loop
Track length	436 metres (1,430 ft)	1,616 metres (5,302 ft)
Rise	160 metres (520 ft)	480 metres (1,570 ft)
Maximum gradient	45%	45.6%
Track gauge	1,200 mm (3 ft 11 1/4 in) previously: 1,000 mm (3 ft 3 3/8 in)	1,440 mm (4 ft 8 11/16 in) previously: 800 mm (2 ft 7 1/2 in)
Number of cars	2 single-section cars	2 two-section cars
Capacity	100 passengers per car	200 passengers per car
Speed	5.5 metres per second (18 ft/s)	6.5 metres per second (21.3 ft/s)
Journey time	2 mins	6.5 mins
Opened	2 January 1913 (112 years ago)	19 December 1928 (96 years ago)
Initial owner	Aktiengesellschaft Drahtseilbahn; St. Moritz-Chantarella in St. Moritz	Aktien-Gesellschaft Drahtseilbahn; Chantarella-Corviglia in St. Moritz

The two sections were initially built by two different companies. The municipality of St. Moritz acquired the two lines in 1938.

The lines are currently operated by Engadin St. Moritz Mountains AG.

== See also ==
- List of funicular railways
- List of funiculars in Switzerland
