= LMS Fowler Class 4F =

Class of steam freight locomotives

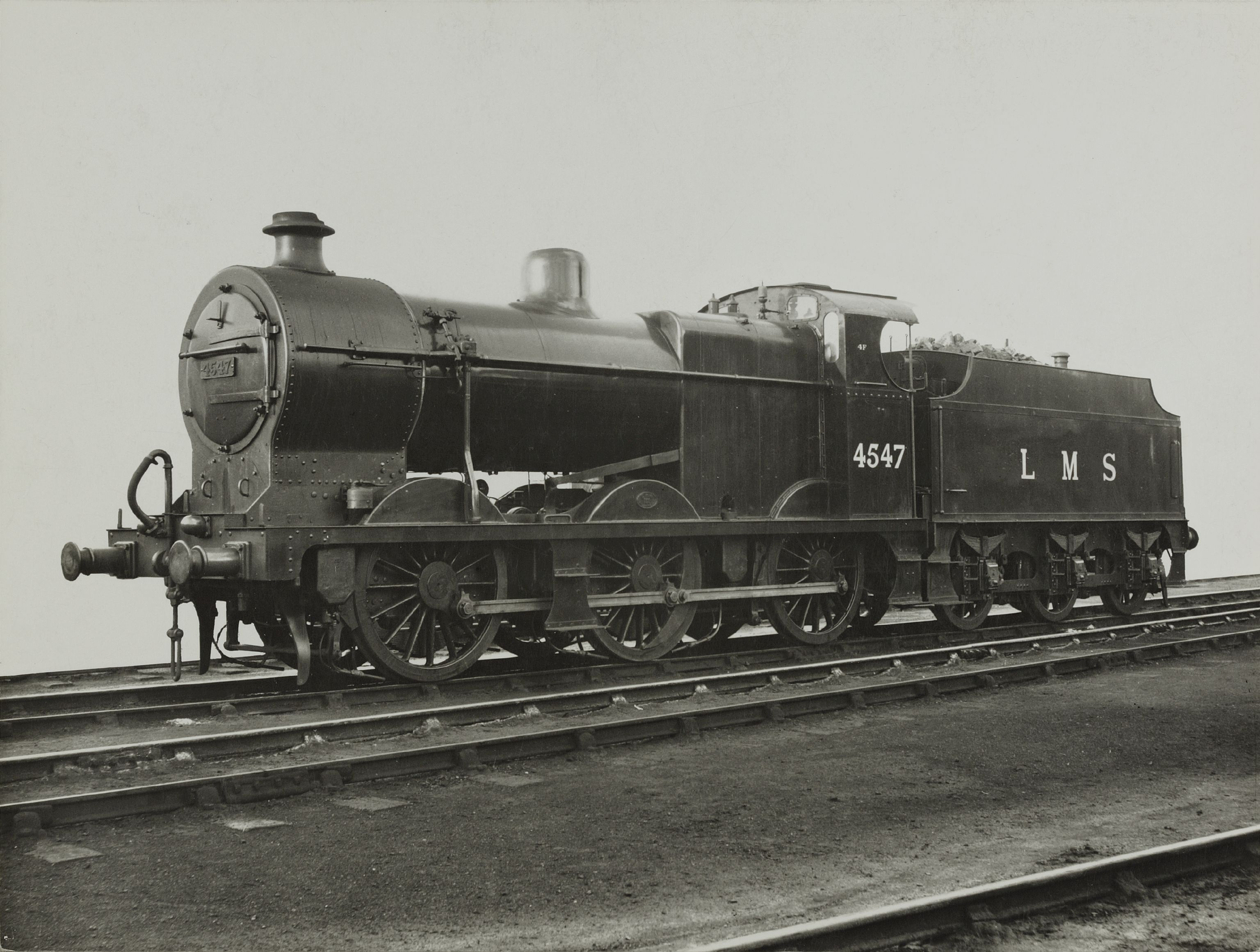
- LMS No. 4547 as being built new during 1928
Type and origin
- Power type: Steam
- Designer: Henry Fowler
- Builder: LMS Derby Works (185); LMS Crewe Works (165); LMS St. Rollox Works (60); LMS Horwich Works (10); North British Locomotive Co. (80); Kerr, Stuart & Co. (50); Andrew Barclay Sons & Co. (25)
- Build date: 1924–1941
- Total produced: 575
Specifications
- Configuration
  - Whyte: 0-6-0
  - UIC: C h2
- Gauge: 4 ft 8 1/2 in (1,435 mm) standard gauge
- Driver dia.: 5 ft 3 in (1.600 m)
- Length: 52 ft 0 1/8 in (15.853 m)
- Loco weight: 48.75 long tons (49.53 t; 54.60 short tons)
- Tender weight: 41.20 long tons (41.86 t; 46.14 short tons)
- Fuel type: Coal
- Fuel capacity: 4 long tons (4.1 t; 4.5 short tons)
- Water cap.: 3,500 imp gal (16,000 L; 4,200 US gal)
- Firebox
  - Grate area: 21 sq ft (2.0 m^{2})
- Boiler: LMS type G7S
- Boiler pressure: 175 lbf/in^{2} (1.21 MPa)
- Heating surface
  - Firebox: 124 sq ft (11.5 m^{2})
  - Tubes and flues: 1,034 sq ft (96.1 m^{2})
- Superheater
  - Heating area: 252 sq ft (23.4 m^{2}) later 246 sq ft (22.9 m^{2})
- Cylinders: Two, inside
- Cylinder size: 20 in × 26 in (508 mm × 660 mm)
- Valve gear: Stephenson
- Valve type: piston valves
- Loco brake: Vacuum
- Train brakes: Vacuum
Performance figures
- Tractive effort: 24,555 lbf (109.23 kN)
Career
- Operators: London, Midland and Scottish Railway; British Railways
- Power class: 4F
- Numbers: LMS: 4027–4606; BR: 44027–44606
- Axle load class: BR: Route Availability 5
- Locale: London Midland Region
- Withdrawn: 1959–1966
- Disposition: 3 preserved, remainder scrapped

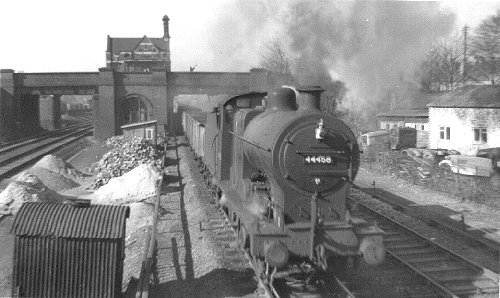
An earlier view of 44458, this time passing Water Orton.

The London, Midland and Scottish Railway (LMS) Fowler Class 4F is a class of 0-6-0 steam locomotive designed for medium freight work. They represent the ultimate development of the Midland Railway's six-coupled tender engines. Many trainspotters knew them as "Duck Sixes", a nickname derived from their wheel arrangement.

== Background ==
The 4F was based on the 197-strong Midland Railway 3835 Class of 1911, with only a few modifications, primarily the adoption of left-hand drive instead of right-hand drive. They originally had been designed by Henry Fowler, who from 1925 became CME of the LMS.

Midland Railway locomotives were notorious for their short axle-box bearings, which were prone to overheating. This design feature was perpetuated in the LMS 4F. The problem was eventually solved with the fitting of mechanical lubricators.

== Construction ==
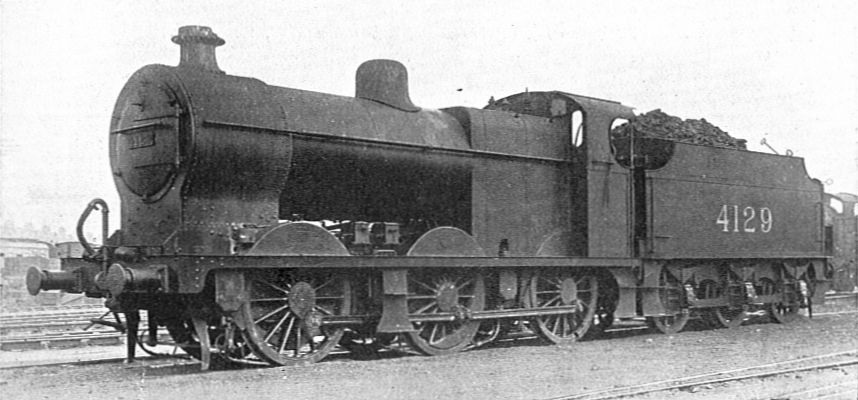
4129 with number on the tender, pre-1928

The LMS constructed 530 of the locomotives between 1923 and 1928, numbered sequentially from where the Midland engines left off from 4027. A further 45 examples were reluctantly authorised by William Stanier in 1937 at the behest of the operating department.

Construction table
LMS nos.	BR nos.	Lot No.	Date built	Built by
4027–4034	44027–44034	7	1924	Derby
4035–4056	44035–44056	7	1925	Derby
4057–4081	44057–44081	8	1925	North British Loco
4082–4106	44082–44106	9	1925	Kerr Stuart
4107	44107	10	1924	Crewe
4108–4158	44108–44158	10	1925	Crewe
4159–4176	44159–44176	10	1926	Crewe
4177–4178	44177–44178	11	1924	St. Rollox
4179–4206	44179–44206	11	1925	St. Rollox
4207–4216	44207–44216	29	1925	Derby
4217–4287	44217–44287	29	1926	Derby
4288–4301	44288–44301	29	1927	Derby
4302–4311	44302–44311	28	1926	Crewe
4312–4322	44312–44322	30	1927	St. Rollox
4323–4331	44323–44331	30	1928	St. Rollox
4332–4342	44332–44342	31	1926	Kerr Stuart
4343–4356	44343–44356	31	1927	Kerr Stuart
4357–4361	44357–44361	32	1926	Andrew Barclay
4362–4381	44362–44381	32	1927	Andrew Barclay
4382–4399	44382–44399	33	1926	North British Loco
4400–4406	44400–44406	33	1927	North British Loco
4407–4436	44407–44436	42	1927	Derby
4437–4446	44437–44446	43	1927	Crewe
4447–4456	44447–44456	43	1928	Crewe
4457–4466	44457–44466	44	1928	Horwich
4467–4476	44467–44476	45	1928	St. Rollox
4477–4506	44477–44506	46	1927	North British Loco
4507–4556	44507–44556	56	1928	Crewe
4562–4575	44562–44575	137	1937	Crewe
4577–4586	44577–44586	146	1939	Derby
4587–4596	44587–44596	147	1939	Derby
4597–4604	44597–44604	147	1940	Derby
4605–4606	44605–44606	147	1941	Derby

The missing numbers (4)4557–61 relate to five locomotives built for the Somerset and Dorset Joint Railway to the Midland Railway 3835 Class design in 1922, and taken into LMS stock in 1930.

All entered British Railways stock in 1948. BR added 40000 to their numbers. They were all withdrawn between 1959 and 1966.

== Accidents and incidents ==
- On 12 February 1929, locomotive No. 4491 was hauling a freight train that was in a head-on collision with an express passenger train, hauled by LNWR Claughton Class 4-6-0 No. 5977, at Doe Hill station, Derbyshire due to a signalman's error. Two people were killed.
- On 4 September 1942, locomotive No. 4541 was hauling a freight train that overran the end of a loop in blackout conditions at Todmorden, Yorkshire and was derailed.
- On 6 June 1961, a locomotive of the class was running light when it was in a head-on collision with a freight train at Carlisle Citadel station, Cumberland.

== Withdrawal ==
The locomotives were withdrawn from 1959 to 1966.

Table of withdrawals
Year	Quantity in service at start of year	Quantity withdrawn	Locomotive numbers
1959	575	44	44032/50/58/64/72–73/85/95, 44103/08/16/20/36/40/42/44–45/61/73/75, 44201/04/17/25/27/30/85/91/93/98, 44306/13/16–17/26/57/61/65/69/72/82–83/85, 44423.
1960	531	41	44029/31/52/77/93, 44163, 44343/60/66/75/91, 44406/10/12/15/27/30/38/53/59/71/73/80/83/88/95–96/98, 44502–03/06–07/10–11/13/15/46/55/63/85, 44600.
1961	490	23	44033/67/77/82/88/90, 44105/07/11/41/47–48/52, 44206/49, 44319/24/71, 44409/74/77, 44547/90.
1962	467	74	44036/62/70/87, 44107/22/28–29/38/43/54/58–59/66/87/89/93–94/96/98–99, 44216/24/28/34/45/51/53–58/67/73/81/83, 44307/12/14/18/20/22–23/25/28–31/38/40/68/88/93/97, 44404/07/17/35/38/87/91, 44508–09/18/21/37/50/53/73/76/79/94, 44606.
1963	393	134	44034/46–47/53/55/66/68–69/71/74/83/85/89/94/97–98, 44100–01/12/14/19/26/32–33/50–51/53/62/64/68/74/76/83–84/86/90, 44202/05/07–09/12/19/23/31–32/37–39/41/52/61–62/65/68/70/72/74/80/82/87/92/97/99, 40303/08–09/35–36/41–42/45/51–52/54/59/63/70/74/78/87/95/98, 44411/13/16/18–19/24/26/32/34/37/42/44–45/47–48/54–55/57/65/69–70/72/75–76/85/93–94, 44504/17/19/23–24/26/30/32/35/39/41–42/45/51/56/62/68/74/82/84/92/95–96/98.
1964	259	153	44027/30/38–42/45/48–49/51/54/59–60/78–80/91–92/96, 44102/06/09–10/17/24/30–31/34/46/49/56/65/67/71–72/77–80/82/85/91/97, 44213–14/20–22/26/29/33/35–36/40/42/44/46/48/59–60/75/79/84/86/88–90/95–96, 44301–02/04/15/21/27/32–33/37/44/48/62/64/67/73/76/79–81/84/92/96/99, 44403/21/28/31/33/36/39–41/52/60–61/63–64/67–68/78–79/81–82/84/97/99, 44501/12/14/16/20/29/31/33–34/38/40/43/49/52/54/64–67/69/71–72/75/77–78/80–81/83/86/88–89/91/93, 44602–05.
1965	106	95	44028/35/43–44/56–57/61/63/65/75–76/81/86/99, 44115/18/21/23/25/27/31/37/39/55/57/60/69–70/81/88/92/95, 44200/10–11/15/43/47/50/63–64/66/69/71/76–77/94, 44300/05/34/39/46–47/49–50/53/56/58/86/89–90, 44400–02/08/14/20/22/25/29/43/49–51/56/58/62/66/86/89–90, 44505/22/27–28/36/44/48/70/87/97/99, 44601.
1966	11	11	44113, 44203/18/78, 44310–11/77/94, 44405, 44500/25.

== Preservation ==
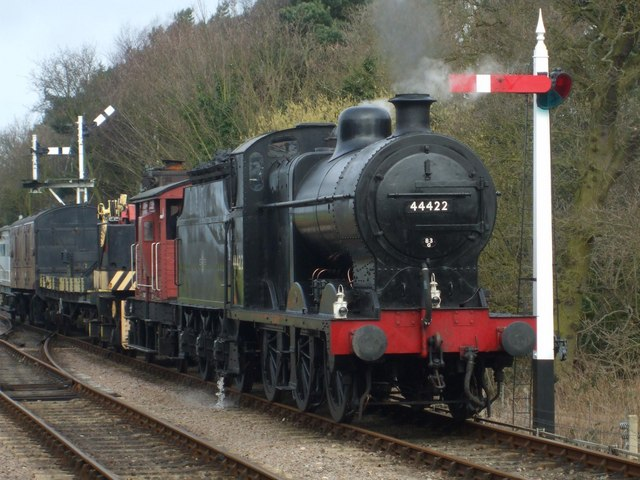
Preserved 44422 pulls into Holt station on the North Norfolk Railway.

Three LMS-built 4Fs survive. The first-built LMS 4F, No. (4)4027is part of the National Collection.

Numbers		Built	Builder	Withdrawn	Service Life	Location	Image	Condition
LMS	BR	Built	Builder	Withdrawn	Service Life	Location	Image	Condition
4027	44027	Nov 1924	Derby Works	Nov 1964	40 Years	Vale of Berkeley Railway		Overhaul in progress following the loco's arrival at Sharpness.
4123	44123	Jul 1925	Crewe Works	Jun 1965	39 Years, 11 months	Avon Valley Railway		Restoration in progress.
4422	44422	Oct 1927	Derby Works	Jun 1965	37 Years, 8 months	Churnet Valley Railway		Under overhaul. Returned to the CVR in December 2019 following the termination of its previous loan agreement with the West Somerset Railway.

== Models ==
The 4F has been modelled by Lima (O gauge, HO gauge and British N gauge) and Graham Farish (British N Gauge, still produced under the Bachmann label). Airfix produced a tender drive model of the 4F in OO gauge in 1978. Production of this was continued by Dapol after it acquired Airfix models in 1985, and were subsequently sold to Hornby in the late 1990s. They upgraded the model with an improved chassis in 2012. Bachmann have produced a version of the Midland railway variant of the 4F since 2012.
