= Midland Railway 3835 Class =

British steam locomotive class (1911–1965)

Midland Railway 3835 Class "Class 4 Goods"
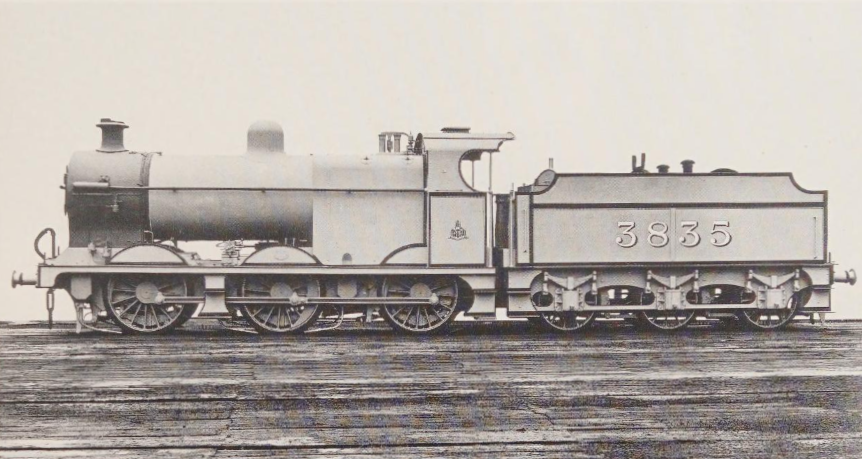
- MR No. 3835, the first of the class
Type and origin
- Power type: Steam
- Designer: Henry Fowler
- Builder: Derby Works (142); Armstrong Whitworth (55)
- Serial number: AW: 416–465 (MR 3937–3986); AW: 468–472 (S&DJR 57–61)
- Build date: 1911, 1917–1922
- Total produced: 197
Specifications
- Configuration
  - Whyte: 0-6-0
  - UIC: C h2g
- Gauge: 4 ft 8 1/2 in (1,435 mm) standard gauge
- Driver dia.: 5 ft 3 in (1,600 mm)
- Wheelbase: Loco: 8 ft 0 in (2,438 mm) + 8 ft 6 in (2,590 mm)
- Loco weight: 48 long tons 15 cwt (109,200 lb or 49.5 t)
- Fuel type: Coal
- Boiler: G7S
- Boiler pressure: 175 lbf/in^{2} (1.21 MPa) superheated
- Superheater: Schmidt
- Cylinders: Two, inside
- Cylinder size: 20 in × 26 in (508 mm × 660 mm)
- Valve gear: Stephenson
- Valve type: Piston valves
Performance figures
- Tractive effort: 24,555 lbf (109.23 kN)
Career
- Operators: MR, SDJR, LMS, BR
- Class: MR: 3835
- Power class: MR: 4 LMS: 4F
- Number in class: MR: 192; SDJR: 5
- Numbers: LMS: 3835–4026; BR: 43835–44026
- Retired: 1954–1965
- Disposition: One preserved, remainder scrapped

The Midland Railway (MR) 3835 Class is a class of 0-6-0 steam locomotives designed for freight work. The first two were introduced in 1911 by Henry Fowler. After the grouping in 1923, the designs were slightly modified and continued to be built up to 1941 by the LMS as the LMS Fowler Class 4F.

== History ==
A total of 197 engines were built. 192 of them were sequentially numbered 3835–4026 for the Midland Railway. After nationalisation in 1948 British Railways added 40000 to their numbers so they became 43835–44026. Five engines were constructed by Armstrong Whitworth for the Somerset and Dorset Joint Railway in 1922, numbered 57–61. They were absorbed into LMS stock in 1930, becoming 4557–4561.

== Accidents and incidents ==
- On 19 November 1926, locomotive No. 3980 was one of two hauling a freight train. One of the private owner wagons disintegrated, derailing the train at Parkgate and Rawmarsh, Yorkshire. A signal post was partly brought down, obstructing an adjacent line. The carriages of an express passenger train had their sides ripped open by the signal post. Eleven people were killed.
- On 6 March 1930, locomotive No. 4009 was hauling a ballast train that collided with a passenger train hauled by ex-LNWR Claughton Class No. 5971 at Langwathby station, Cumberland. The passenger train had departed from Culgaith against signals. Two people were killed and four were seriously injured.

== Withdrawal ==
The 197 engines in this class were withdrawn between 1954 and 1965 as follows:

Table of withdrawals
| Year | Quantity in service at start of year | Quantity withdrawn | Locomotive numbers |
|---|---|---|---|
| 1954 | 197 | 1 | 43862 |
| 1955 | 196 | 5 | 43835/67/94, 43909, 44006 |
| 1956 | 191 | 8 | 43874–75/95, 43936/43/56/74, 44024 |
| 1957 | 183 | 19 | 43837–38/47/51–52/57/89/91/98, 43901/12/16/27/41/59/80/92–93, 44017 |
| 1958 | 164 | 4 | 43879/92, 43978, 44021 |
| 1959 | 160 | 36 | 43836/41–42/58/60/64/66/73/77–78/81/86/90/96, 43904/07/10/19/26/30/34/39/46/60–61/65–66/70/84/90/97–98, 44000/05/14/18 |
| 1960 | 124 | 8 | 43839–40/43/68/97, 43973/89, 44019 |
| 1961 | 116 | 15 | 43846/63/72/83–84, 43900/05/11/20–22/44/48/62, 44002 |
| 1962 | 101 | 22 | 43844/48–49/59/69/76/99, 43902/14/32–33/38/85/96, 44001/04/08/11/16/20, 44557/61 |
| 1963 | 79 | 23 | 43845/53/55/61/70/82, 43915/35/37/42/45/55/69/77/87/95, 44010/12–13/15/22/26, 44559 |
| 1964 | 56 | 34 | 43850/54/56/71/80/85/88, 43903/08/17/23/25/28–29/31/40/47/49/51/54/57–58/63/71–72/76/79/86/88, 44007/09/23/25, 44558 |
| 1965 | 22 | 22 | 43865/87/93, 43906/13/18/24/50/52–53/64/67–68/75/81–83/91/94/99, 44003, 44560 |

== Preservation ==
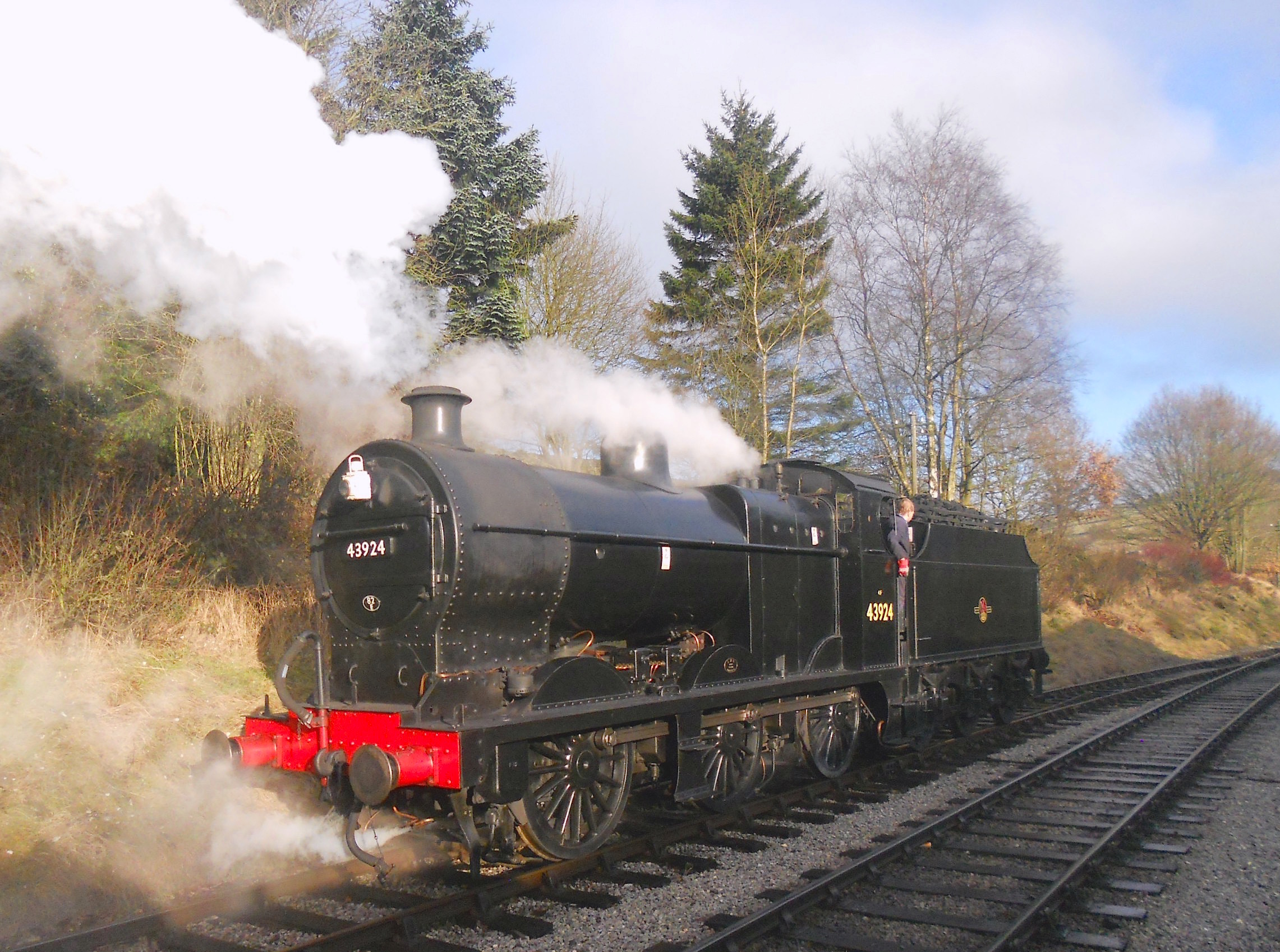
43924 at Oxenhope, KVWR

One Midland-built 4F, (4)3924 is preserved on the Keighley & Worth Valley Railway, the first locomotive to leave Woodham Brothers scrapyard in Barry, South Wales in September 1968.

== Models ==
Bachmann Branchline 3835 Class in OO gauge, which was also adapted into Graham Farish N gauge model.

| Product Ref. | No. | Livery |
|---|---|---|
| 31-880 | 3851 | LMS unlined black, number on loco. |
| 31-882 | 43875 | BR black, early crest |
| 31-883 | 3848 | Midland Railway black |
| 31-884 | 44044 | BR black, late crest |

Hornby introduced a OO gauge model of 3924 in 2022 to celebrate the film "Return of the Railway Children" which featured this locomotive. The model is in a variation of LMS unlined black.
