= LNER Class V2 4771 Green Arrow =

2-6-2 preserved English steam locomotive

London and North Eastern Railway 4771 Green Arrow
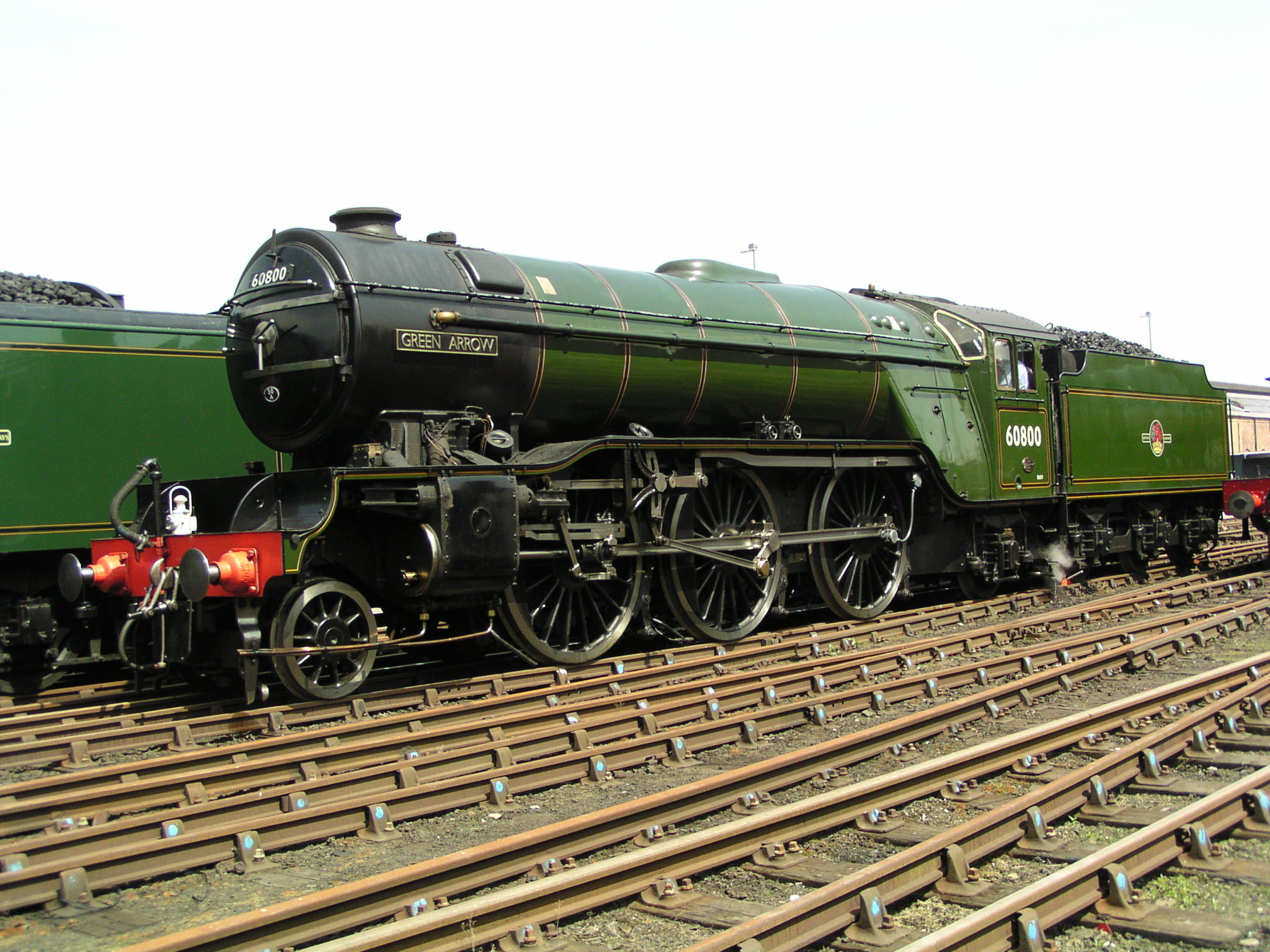
- 4771 Green Arrow at Crewe Works.
Type and origin
- Power type: Steam
- Designer: Sir Nigel Gresley
- Builder: Doncaster Works
- Serial number: 1837
- Build date: June 1936
Specifications
- Configuration
  - Whyte: 2-6-2
  - UIC: 1′C1′ h3
- Gauge: 4 ft 8 1/2 in (1,435 mm) standard gauge
- Driver dia.: 6 ft 4 in (1,930 mm)
- Axle load: 22.4 t (22.0 long tons; 24.7 short tons)
- Loco weight: 94.6 t (93.1 long tons; 104.3 short tons)
- Total weight: 144.1 long tons (146.4 t; 161.4 short tons)
- Fuel type: Coal
- Water cap.: 19,094 L (5,044 U.S. gal)
- Boiler pressure: 220 psi (1,500 kPa)
- Heating surface
  - Tubes: 205.87 m^{2} (2,216.0 sq ft)
  - Total surface: 205.87 m^{2} (2,216.0 sq ft)
- Superheater
  - Heating area: 63.17 m^{2} (680.0 sq ft)
- Cylinders: 3
- Cylinder size: 470 mm × 660 mm (19 in × 26 in)
- Valve gear: Inside: Gresley conjugated, Outside: Walschaerts
- Valve type: Piston valves
- Train heating: Steam
- Loco brake: Steam brake, Vacuum
- Train brakes: Vacuum
Performance figures
- Power output: 2,382 hp (1,776 kW)
- Tractive effort: 33,730 lbf (150.0 kN)
Career
- Operators: London and North Eastern Railway British Railways
- Class: LNER Class V2
- Numbers: 637 (initial number), 4771 (as officially numbered), renumbered 800, renumbered 60800
- Official name: Green Arrow
- Retired: August 1962
- Current owner: National Railway Museum
- Disposition: Static Display, Awaiting Overhaul

The LNER Class V2 2-6-2 steam locomotive, number 4771 Green Arrow was built in June 1936 for the London and North Eastern Railway (LNER) at Doncaster Works to a design of Nigel Gresley. The first-built and sole surviving member of its class, it was designed for hauling express freight and passenger trains and named after an express freight service.

== Operational life ==
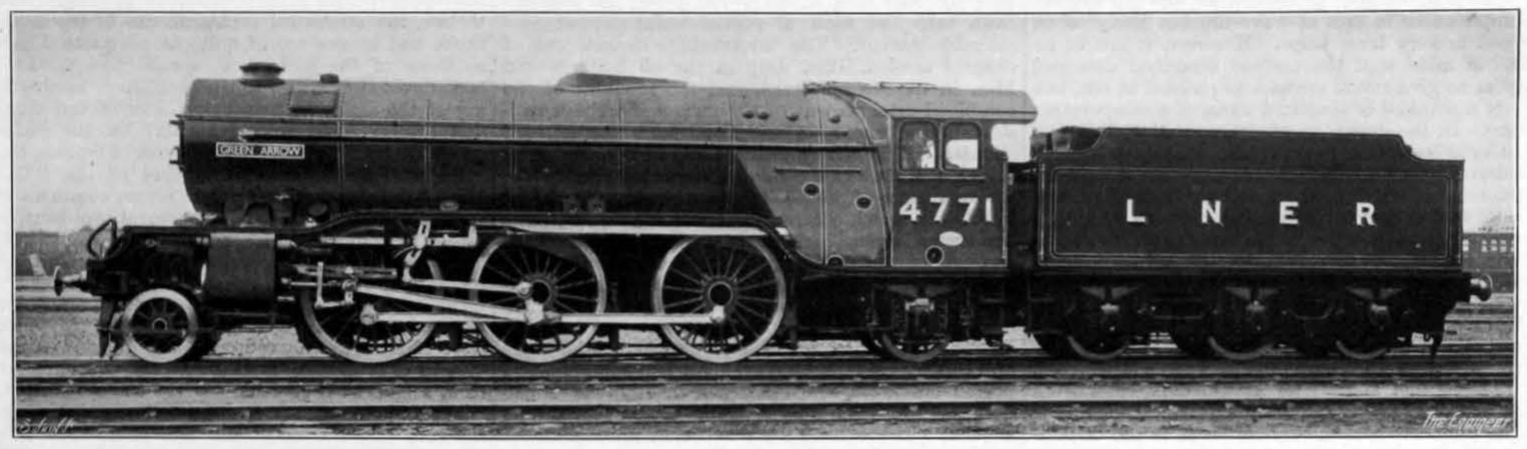
Green Arrow in 1936.

Initially allotted the number 637, Green Arrow was fitted with curved nameplates over the middle driving wheels. Before entry into LNER service, its number was altered to 4771, and the curved driving wheel nameplates were replaced with straight nameplates mounted on the sides of the smokebox. In order to do this, the builder's plate (Doncaster Works No. 1837) had to be re-located to below the cab windows.

The locomotive was allocated no. 700 in 1943, but this was never carried by the locomotive and was revised to 800 in April 1946, which was applied by the LNER in November 1946. Under British Railways, it was renumbered 60800 in February 1949.

== Preservation ==
=== Early preservation ===
Green Arrow was withdrawn from British Railways service in August 1962, and selected for preservation within the national collection, it was cosmetically restored at Doncaster Works.

With work completed in April 1963, it was followed by almost ten years of storage, during which it was moved several times. A transfer from Doncaster to Hellifield occurred in October 1964; the locomotive was moved to Wigston in 1967 - this was intended to be the final temporary home, since it was intended that Green Arrow would become one of the permanent exhibits in a Municipal Museum which was proposed for the nearby city of Leicester. However, before the museum was ready, demolition of Wigston locomotive depot was scheduled, and the locomotive was sent south to the Preston Park shops of the Pullman Car Company in September 1970. The National Railway Museum (NRM) was then being planned, and in November 1971 Green Arrow was selected for the National Collection, items from which would form the main display in the NRM.

=== Operation in preservation ===
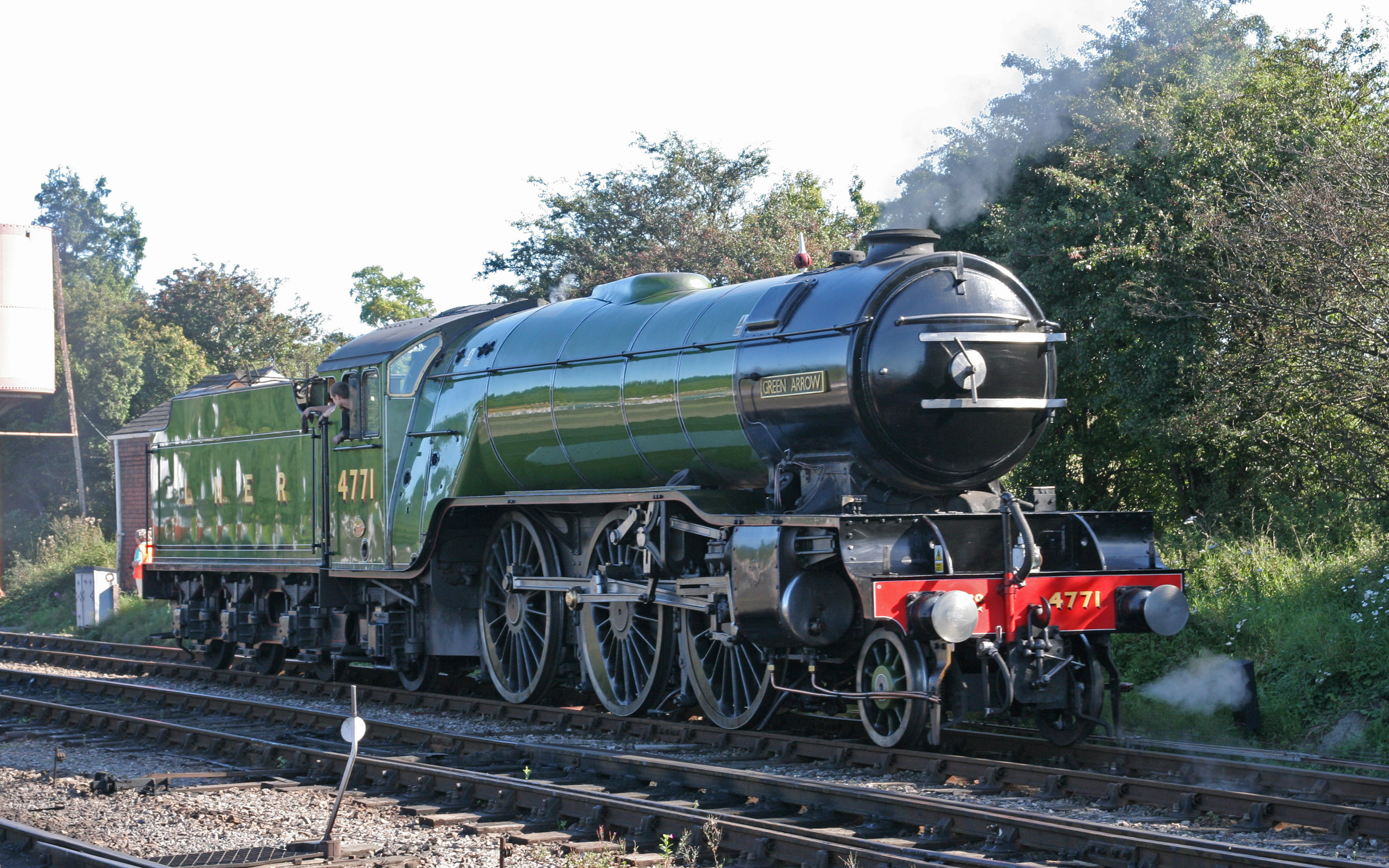
Green Arrow on the Gloucestershire Warwickshire Railway in 2007.

The locomotive was again moved, this time to Norwich depot in January 1972, where it was returned to working order; the first trial trip, to Ely, was on 28 March 1973. It then commenced a series of runs at the head of special trains, before being moved to Carnforth on 2 July 1973. In September 1979, Green Arrow headed The Centenary Express, as part of an exhibition tour of the country organised by Travellers Fare to celebrate the centenary of on-train catering. Green Arrow ran in preservation until being withdrawn from service on 21 April 2008, shortly before its boiler certificate expired.

After a series of commemorative runs on preserved railways, the locomotive moved to the North Yorkshire Moors Railway for their LNER gala in March 2008. Following the first gala weekend, the boiler was found to have two cracked superheater tubes; temporary repairs allowed the loco to make a final run on the second weekend before being finally withdrawn.

=== Static display ===
Following this, the loco returned to the National Collection and was put on static display at the National Railway Museum's Locomotion site at Shildon. In 2015 it was announced that Green Arrow is one of the planned exhibits for the Great Central Railway's proposed railway museum located at Leicester North station. In February 2021 it was announced that the locomotive had been loaned for 3 years to the newly relocated Danum Gallery.

== Models ==
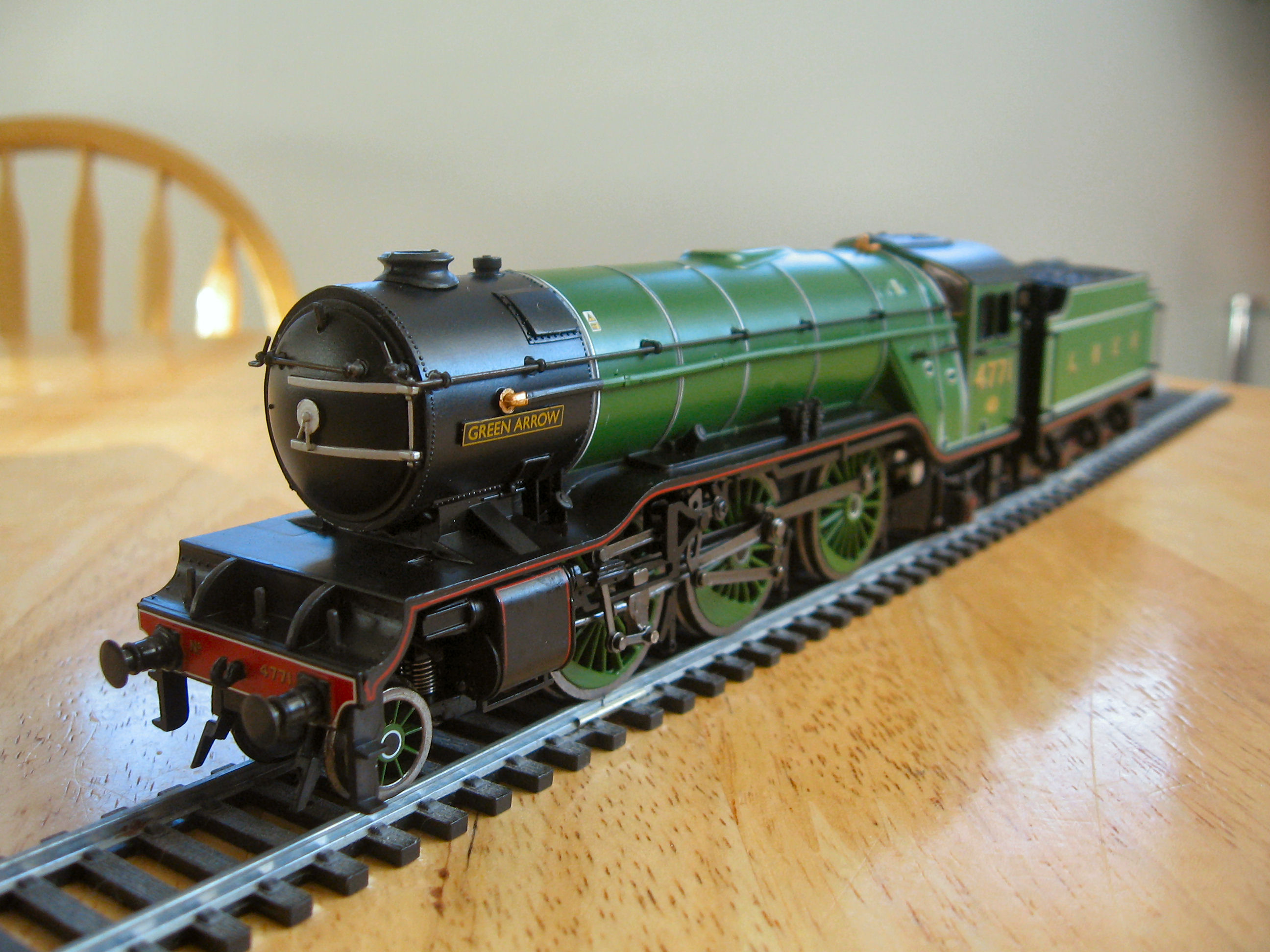
Bachmann model.

Bachmann and Graham Farish produce models of Green Arrow for OO gauge and N gauge respectively, as part of their 2011 ranges.
