= LNER Class V2 =

Class of 184 three-cylinder 2-6-2 locomotives

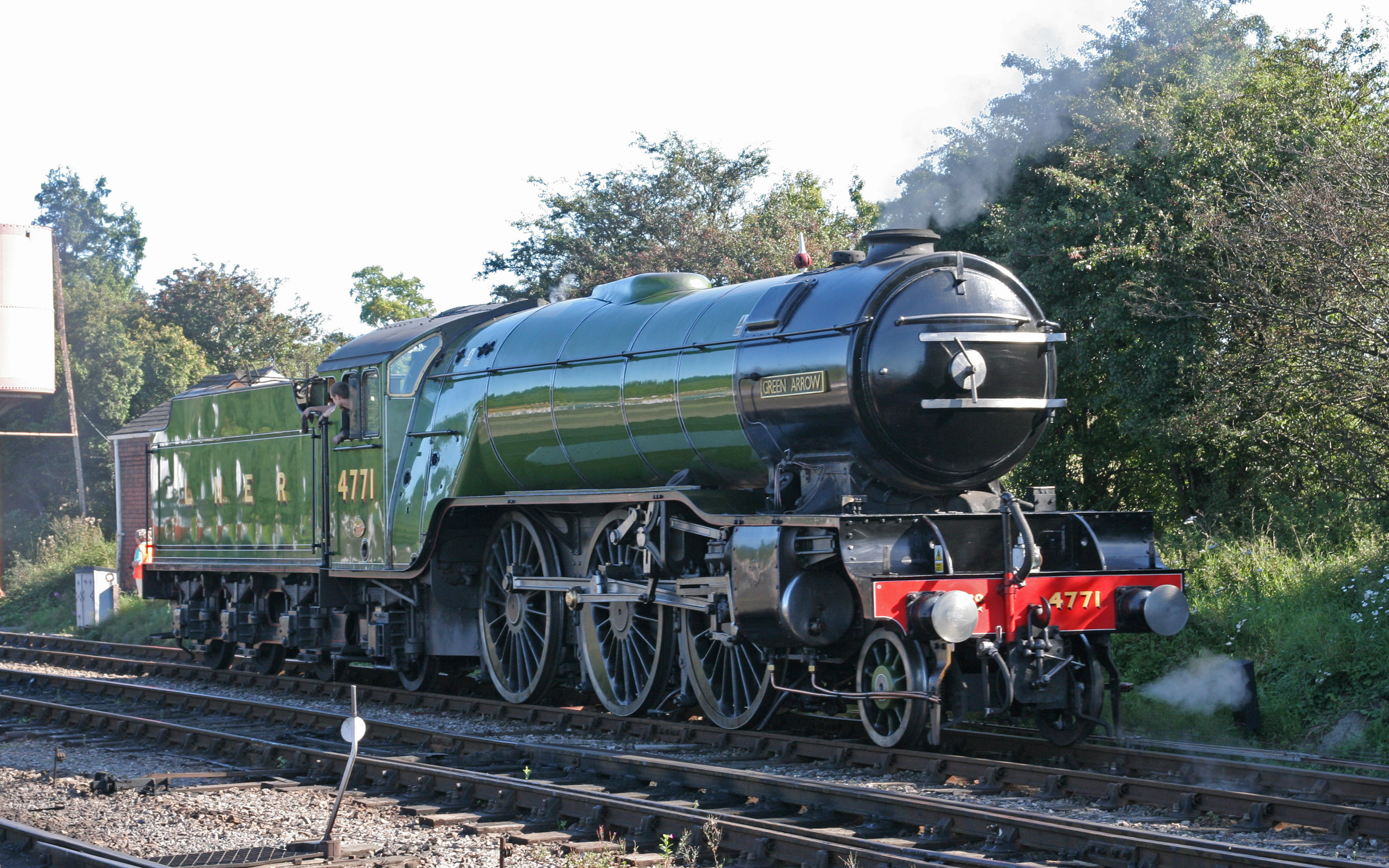
- 4771 LNER class V2 Green Arrow at Toddington railway station
Type and origin
- Power type: Steam
- Designer: Sir Nigel Gresley
- Builder: LNER Doncaster and Darlington Works
- Build date: 1936–1944
- Total produced: 184
Specifications
- Configuration
  - Whyte: 2-6-2
  - UIC: 1′C1′ h3
- Gauge: 4 ft 8 1/2 in (1,435 mm) standard gauge
- Leading dia.: 3 ft 2 in (0.965 m)
- Driver dia.: 6 ft 2 in (1.880 m)
- Trailing dia.: 3 ft 8 in (1.118 m)
- Length: 66 ft 5.125 in (20.24698 m)
- Axle load: 22 long tons (22 t; 25 short tons)
- Loco weight: 93 long tons 2 cwt (208,500 lb or 94.6 t)
- Tender weight: 52 long tons 0 cwt (116,500 lb or 52.8 t)
- Fuel type: Coal
- Fuel capacity: 7 long tons 10 cwt (16,800 lb or 7.6 t)
- Water cap.: 4,200 imp gal (19,000 L; 5,000 US gal)
- Firebox
  - Grate area: 41.25 sq ft (3.832 m^{2})
- Boiler
  - Diameter: 5 ft 9.2 in (1,758 mm) outside
- Boiler pressure: 220 psi (1.52 MPa)
- Heating surface: 2,431.07 sq ft (225.854 m^{2})
- Superheater
  - Heating area: 679.67 sq ft (63.143 m^{2})
- Cylinders: Three
- Cylinder size: 18.5 in × 26 in (470 mm × 660 mm)
- Valve gear: Outside: Walschaerts; Inside: Gresley conjugated
Performance figures
- Tractive effort: 33,730 lbf (150.0 kN)
Career
- Operators: London and North Eastern Railway, British Railways
- Class: LNER: V2
- Power class: BR: 6MT
- Retired: 1962–1966
- Disposition: One preserved, remainder scrapped

The London and North Eastern Railway (LNER) Class V2 2-6-2 steam locomotives were designed by Sir Nigel Gresley for express mixed traffic work across the British railway network. They were built at the LNER workshops in Doncaster and Darlington between 1936 and 1944. The best known example is the first of the class to be constructed: 4771 Green Arrow, which is now the only example of the class in preservation.

== Construction ==
The V2s were the only major class of 2-6-2 tender locomotives used in Britain. While 2-6-2T tank locomotives were common in the UK, the only other 2-6-2 tender locomotives were the unsuccessful experimental Midland Railway Paget locomotive of 1908, and the two examples of Gresley's LNER Class V4 of 1941. The wheel arrangement allowed the fitting of a large firebox uninhibited by the rear driving wheel, and the front pony truck improved stability at high speeds.

The V2 was derived from the Class A1/A3 pacifics with smaller driving wheels (of 6 ft 2 in or 1.880 m compared to 6 ft 8 in or 2.032 m) and a shortened boiler. It retained Gresley's favoured 3-cylinder arrangement. Unusually, all 3 cylinders were part of a single 'monobloc' casting.

184 locomotives were built in 14 batches between 1936 and 1944 at Doncaster and Darlington Works, construction continuing through the Second World War as they proved their usefulness. A further four locomotives, ordered as V2s, were redesigned by Gresley's successor Edward Thompson and completed as Pacifics (LNER Thompson Class A2/1).

The V2 was a versatile locomotive, capable of hauling fast fitted freights and express passenger trains. Its relatively heavy 22-ton axle load meant that its use was restricted to around 40% of the LNER's route miles. For example, it was barred from all of the former Great Eastern Railway main lines. Gresley recognised that a lighter mixed-traffic locomotive was required, and the V4 class was designed to this end. However, it was to be the versatile LNER Thompson Class B1 4-6-0 that succeeded the V2 as the LNER's standard mixed traffic locomotive, although the B1 never matched the V2's power output.

== Working life ==
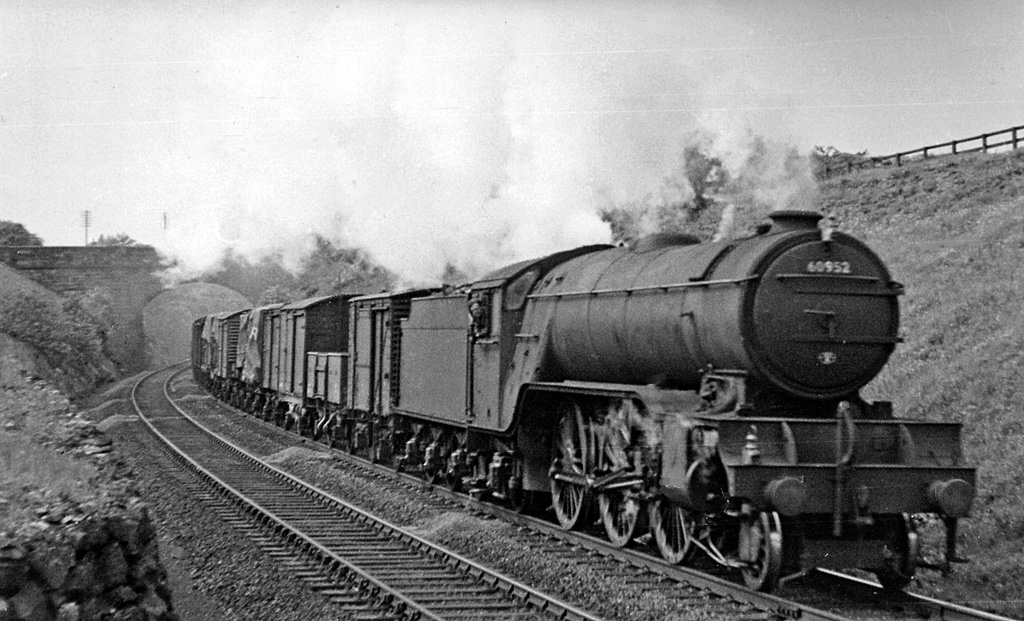
60952 pulling a freight train

First of the initial batch for five Doncaster-built V2s was number 4771, which emerged in June 1936 and was promptly named "Green Arrow", after the express freight service for which the locomotives had been built. Successful trials with this quintet led to both Doncaster and Darlington works producing further batches. The final locomotive, number 3695, was delivered from Darlington in July 1944.

The V2 had the free-steaming qualities that the LNER's operating department required. Not only was it capable of working vacuum-braked freights at up to 60 mph (97 km/h), it could deputise for Pacifics on express passenger schedules. In peak condition a V2 could almost match the Pacifics for sustained high-speed running. One locomotive was reliably timed at 93 mph (150 km/h) on the Yorkshire Pullman, while another attained 101.5 mph (163 km/h) on a test train.

The V2s were recognised by 1939 as versatile and powerful locomotives, but their reputation was more firmly established by their remarkable feats of haulage during the Second World War. Trains of over 20 carriages loaded to 700 long tons (710 t) proved within their abilities. On at least one occasion a single V2 hauled 26 coaches from Peterborough to London. Given this capacity for work it was not surprising that construction was allowed to continue through the war years. The V2s performed equally competently for British Railways, leaving their mark on the East Coast Main Line, the Waverley Route between Carlisle and Edinburgh and on the ex-Great Central main line between London Marylebone and Sheffield.

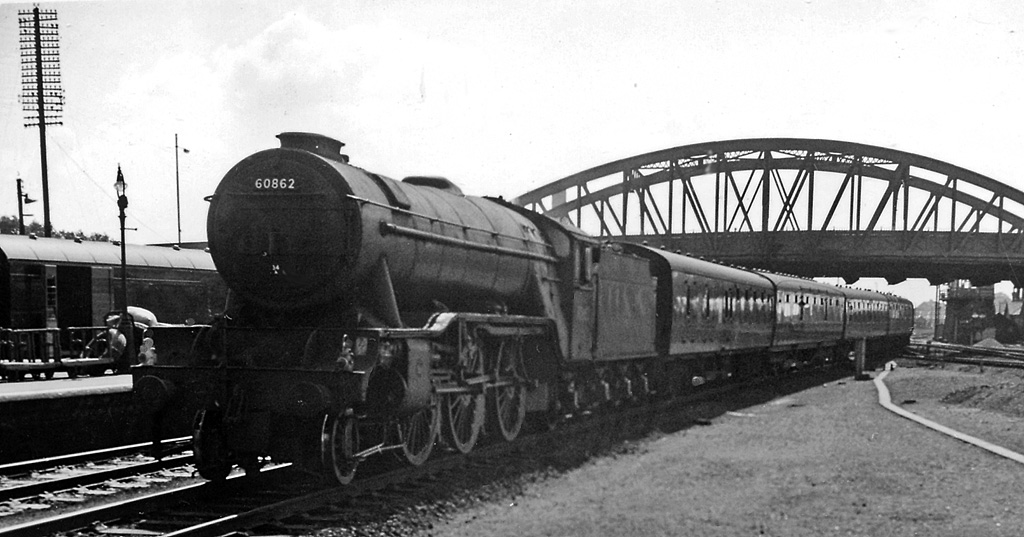
60862 fitted with a double chimney

Significant modifications were made to the V2 class during its service life. In 1946 a series of derailments was traced to the design of the leading pony truck, which was unduly sensitive to the often poor track conditions, a legacy of heavy wartime use and lack of maintenance. Modifications to the suspension cured the problem. During the 1950s cracks in the 3-cylinder monoblocs became increasingly frequent, but replacing them was expensive and in 1956 the decision was taken to replace the monobloc with separate cylinder castings. Seventy-one engines were thus modified: they can be identified by the presence of external steam pipes from smokebox to cylinders. Finally, around 1960 experiments were made with fitting double chimneys to two V2s. This yielded no significant performance gain, but eight engines were subsequently fitted with Kylchap exhausts. These so-called 'Super V2s' were reckoned to be fully equal in performance to the larger Pacifics. However, plans to fit Kylchap chimneys to the remainder of the class were abandoned once it became clear that replacement with diesel locomotives was imminent.

The V2s' swansong came on the Edinburgh—Aberdeen run, working alongside the last LNER A2s and A4s. The entire class was withdrawn from service between 1962 and 1966.

== Accidents and incidents ==
- On 29 January 1939, locomotive No. 4813 was hauling a passenger train which ran into the rear of another at Hatfield, Hertfordshire. Two people were killed and seven were injured.
- On 5 January 1946, a freight train became divided on the East Coast Main Line in County Durham. The front portion was brought to a halt at Browney Signalbox, but the rear portion crashed into it. The wreckage fouled signal cables, giving a false clear signal to a passenger train hauled by locomotive No. 4895. This train collided with the wreckage. Ten people were killed.
- On 10 February 1946, a passenger train was derailed at Potters Bar, Hertfordshire, due to a signalman's error. The wreckage fouled signal cables, giving a false clear to an express passenger train hauled by locomotive No. 4876, which collided with the wreckage. A third passenger train hauled by locomotive No. 4833 was travelling in the opposite direction, and it crashed into the wreckage. Two people were killed.
- On 9 August 1947, locomotive no. 936 was hauling a passenger train that was in a rear-end collision with another at Doncaster due to a signalman's error. Twenty-one people were killed and 188 were injured.
- On 2 December 1953, a train, hauled by Ex-WD Austerity 2-8-0 No. 90048, ran off the end of the loop at Billingham, County Durham and was derailed. Locomotive No. 60891 was hauling an express freight train which ran into the wreckage and was also derailed.
- On 19 April 1955, locomotive No. 60968 was in collision with Fairburn tank No. 42085 at Newcastle Central station, Northumberland. Both locomotives were derailed.
- On 7 August 1958, a locomotive of the class was hauling an express passenger train that was derailed at Barby, Northamptonshire due to excessive speed through a crossover. One person was killed and seventeen were injured. Errors by a pilotman and confusion over where the train was to be diverted during a period of single line working were major contributory factors.
- On 19 November 1958, a freight train, hauled by BR Standard Class 9F 2-10-0 No. 92187, overran signals and was involved in a rear-end collision with another at Hitchin, Hertfordshire. Locomotive No. 60885 was hauling a third freight train, which ran into the wreckage and was derailed.
- On 15 December 1961, an empty coaching stock train was in a rear-end collision with a freight train at Conington, Huntingdonshire during permissive block working. A second freight train then ran into the wreckage. Locomotive No. 60977 was hauling a freight train which then ran into the wreckage.
- On 7 January 1962, locomotive No. 60954 was hauling a freight train which was derailed at Mirfield, Yorkshire.

== Names ==
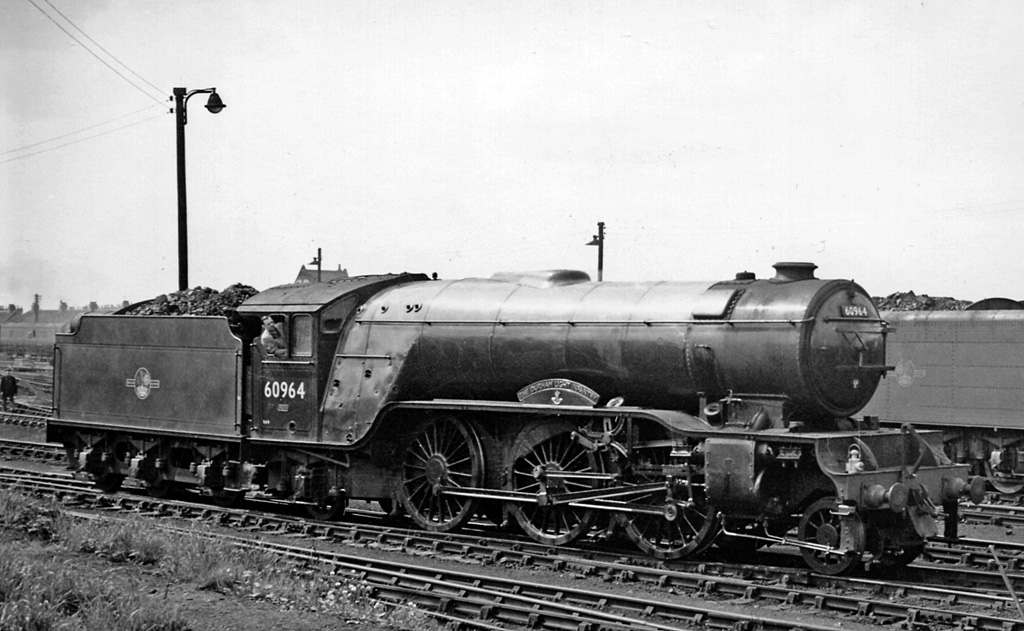
Named V2 60964 The Durham Light Infantry at York in 1958. It had only been named the previous month.

Only eight V2s were named; seven by the LNER and one by BR. The first of the class was named after the express freight train Green Arrow. Five more were named after Regiments and two after public schools. It is probable that more would have been named had the outbreak of war not intervened.

Original No.	LNER 1946 No.	BR No.	Name	Notes
4771	800	60800	Green Arrow	Preserved
4780	809	60809	The Snapper, The East Yorkshire Regiment, The Duke of York's Own	
4806	835	60835	The Green Howard, Alexandra, Princess of Wales's Own Yorkshire Regiment	
4818	847	60847	St Peter's School York AD627	
4831	860	60860	Durham School	
4843	872	60872	King's Own Yorkshire Light Infantry	
4844	873	60873	Coldstreamer	
3676	964	60964	The Durham Light Infantry	Named in April 1958

== Numbering ==
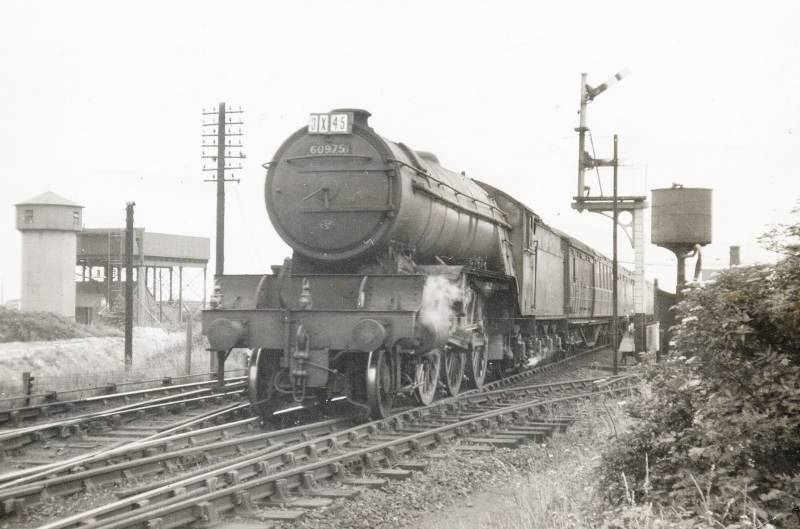
60975 at Newstead

When built, the V2s were numbered 3641–3695 and 4771–4899. Under the LNER 1946 renumbering scheme they were to be renumbered 700-883 but the range 800–983 was allocated before renumbering was completed (19 locomotives briefly carried numbers in the original range). After nationalisation in 1948, British Railways added 60000 to their numbers so they became 60800–60983. BR also gave them the power classification 6MT.

== Withdrawal ==
All 184 V2s were withdrawn from stock between February 1962 and December 1966. The last ones in service were No. 60831 and No. 60836. Both had the distinction of being Gresley's last big engines to be in service. No. 60831 and No. 60836 were withdrawn on 6 December 1966 and 31 December 1966 respectively. Both of them were scrapped the following year. The surviving V2 no 4771/60800 Green Arrow was withdrawn in August 1962 from Kings Cross shed.

Summary of withdrawals
Year	Quantity in service at start of year	No. Withdrawn	Quantity Withdrawn	Locomotive Numbers
1962	184	69	69	60800–01/07/11/15/19–21/23/26–27/29/32/39–40/42/45/48–51/57/60/63/66–67/73–75/78–79/88/90/93–94/96, 60907–09/11/14–15/17–18/20/26–28/30/33–34/36–38/43/47/49/51/53/56/58/60/65/71/77–80/83
1963	116	43	112	60803–05/14/17/30/41/52–54/58/61–62/69–72/80–81/83/89/92/97–99, 60900/02–03/05–06/12/21/24/35/48/50/54/59/66/68/72/74/81
1964	72	32	144	60802/08–09/12/22/25/33–34/38/55–56/64/82/87/91, 60904/10/13/16/22/25/32/39/41–42/45/57/64/67/69/75/82
1965	40	26	170	60810/16/28/35/37/43–44/46–47/59/65/76/84–85/95, 60901/23/29/31/40/44/46/52/61–63
1966	14	14	184	60806/13/18/24/31/36/68/77/86, 60919/55/70/73/76

== Preservation ==
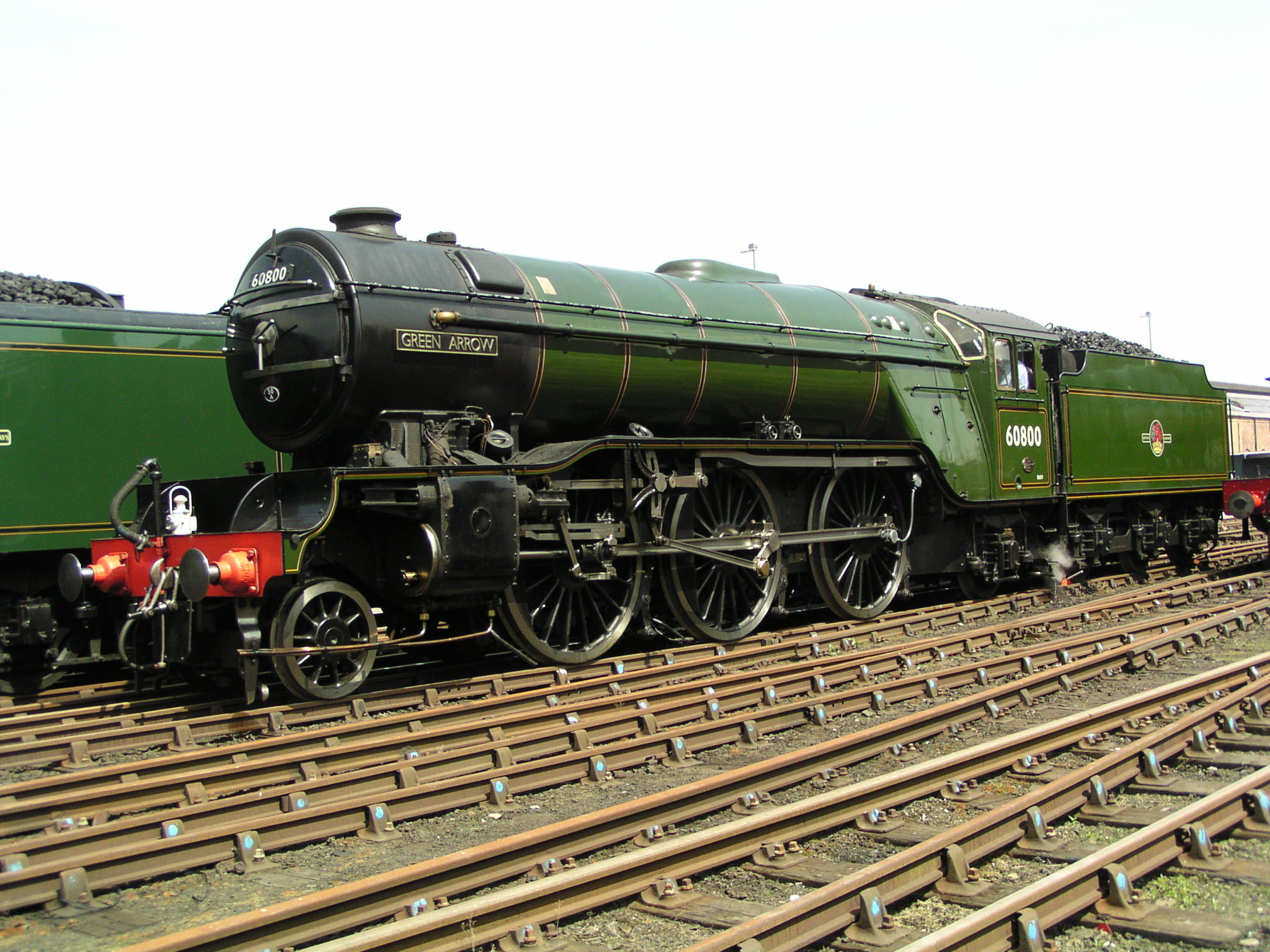
60800 Green Arrow at Crewe Works open day on 1 June 2003. This locomotive is the sole survivor of its class, and is seen here in its British Railways locomotive green livery.

One Class V2 survives, the first of the class to be constructed: 4771 Green Arrow. Withdrawn from service in 1962, Green Arrow was immediately selected for preservation as part of the National Collection. It was eventually returned to working order in 1972 and steamed on and off on preserved lines around Britain until 2008.

== Modelling ==
In 2021 Bachmann Europe introduced a new OO gauge model as part of their Branchline range, including an updated DCC ready chassis equipped with a 21-pin socket:

35-200 LNER V2 2-6-2 4791 LNER Lined Green (Original)

35-201 LNER V2 2-6-2 60845 in BR Lined Black (Early Emblem)

35-202 LNER V2 2-6-2 60847 "St Peters School" in BR Lined Green (Late Crest)

Older (pre-2012) Bachmann models had a split chassis design that required a lot of modification to convert to DCC.

In August 2024 Bachmann Europe announced that their Graham Farish brand had developed new tooling for an N scale model for the first time in over 20 years. The new models are DCC ready accepting a Next18 decoder with sound fitted versions being offered (all models feature a speaker in the tender). Five liveries were initially offered:

372-610 LNER V2 2-6-2 4791 in LNER Lined Green (Original)

372-611 LNER V2 2-6-2 4843 "Kings Own Yorkshire Light Infantry" in LNER Lined Green

372-612 LNER V2 2-6-2 60845 in BR Lined Black (Early Emblem)

372-613 LNER V2 2-6-2 60964 "Durham Light Infantry" in BR Lined Green (Late Crest)

372-614 LNER V2 2-6-2 60847 "St Peter's School" in BR Lined Green (Late Crest)
