= Bachmann Branchline =

British model railway brand

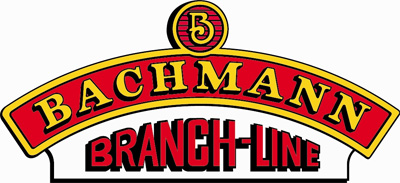
- Industry: Rail transport modelling
- Founded: 1989
- Parent: Bachmann Industries
- Website: https://www.bachmann.co.uk

Bachmann Branchline is a British OO gauge model railway brand manufactured by Bachmann Europe PLC, a subsidiary of Bachmann Industries, and is used for British outline OO scale model railways.

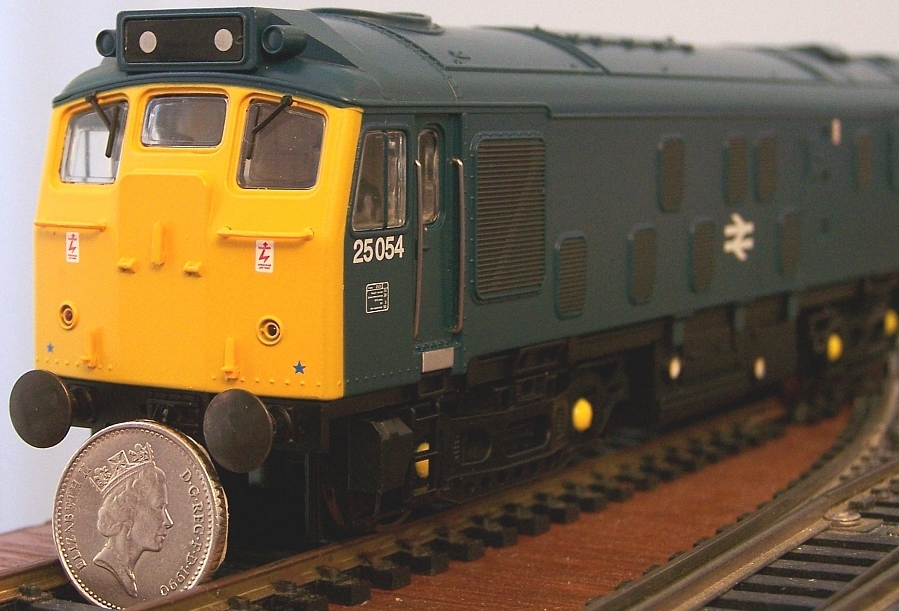
U.K. prototype model of a 00 scale (1:76) British Rail Class 25 shown with an 18mm-five pence coin for scale

Bachmann, a US company founded in 1835, was purchased by Kader Industries in 1987. Kader had previously produced models for Palitoy under the Mainline brand. Palitoy required its manufacturers to produce and retain ownership of the toolings and Kader had used the toolings and added new ones for models commissioned by Replica Railways following the demise of Mainline.

Kader formed Bachmann Europe PLC in 1989 with its main UK headquarters in Moat Way, Barwell, and the following year launched the Bachmann Branchline range for the British market with the moulds that had previously been used for Mainline Railways and Replica. From this starting point Bachmann has developed the range further and now produce a large range of models competing in particular with Hornby.

In 2000, Bachmann Europe PLC bought Graham Farish, an N gauge manufacturer, and since then many of its models have been made available in both gauges.

== Items ==
Bachmann is known for its consistent quality of model trains. Many of its trains include NEM pockets, making it possible to replace standard tension lock coupling with close couplings such as Kadees or screw link couplings.

== Models produced ==
The following locomotive models have been produced, or announced by Bachmann Branchline:

=== Diesel locomotives ===
Class	Liveries	Notes
03 BR/Gardener Shunter	BR Plain Green, BR Green & Wasp Stripes, BR Blue, NCB Black	Special Edition models in Network SouthEast and WAGN liveries. DCC Ready (18 Pin)
08 BR/English Electric Shunter	BR Black, BR Green, BR Blue, EWS, Freightliner, First Great Western (limited edition of 512)	Later models Digital Command Control (DCC) ready. Formerly available in LMR blue. New tooling releasing 2025.
20 English Electric Type 2	BR Green, BR Blue, DRS, Harry Needle Railroad Company, Waterman Railways (collectors club limited edition), GB Railfreight	DCC Sound version available
24 Sulzer Type 2	BR Green, BR Blue	DCC ready. DCC Sound version available. Post 2008 versions features directional lighting and 21 pin DCC socket.
25 Sulzer Type 2	BR Green, BR Two Tone Green, BR Blue	DCC ready. Post 2008 version features directional lighting and 21 pin DCC socket. DCC Sound version available.
30 Brush type 2	BR two tone green.	DCC Ready, Released 2024.
31 Brush type 2	BR green, BR blue, BR railfreight, petroleum sector grey, mainline freight blue.	DCC ready, Released 2024.
37 English Electric Type 3	BR Blue Large Logo, BR Green (collectors club limited edition), Civil Engineers, Coal Sector, Intercity Mainline, Transrail, EWS, Direct Rail Services (commissioned limited editions), DB Schenker (limited edition of 504).	New revised version released summer 2007; all versions now DCC ready. First DCC Sound versions released spring 2008 as "Coed Bach" in Coal sector livery and "Viking" in BR Large Logo Blue.
40 English Electric Type 4	BR Green, BR Blue	Post 2015 models DCC Ready. DCC Sound versions available
42 Warship Class	BR Maroon, BR Blue, BR Green (As of Jan 2020)	Old Mainline Model replaced in 2015 with brand new tooling
44 BR/Sulzer Type 4	BR Green	Post 2015 models DCC Ready. DCC Sound versions available
45 BR/Sulzer Type 4	BR Green, BR Blue With White Roof	DCC Ready
46 BR/Sulzer Type 4	BR Blue	Post 2015 models DCC Ready. DCC Sound versions available
47 Brush Type 4	Two Tone Green, BR Blue, InterCity Swallow - Windsor Castle (limited edition of 500), BR Great Western 150 Green - G J Churchward (limited edition), First Great Western Heritage two-tone Green - Abertawe Landore (limited edition)	Released 2021 - DCC Sound version available
66 Electro-Motive Diesel Type 6	EWS, Direct Rail Services, Freightliner, GB Railfreight, Belmond Royal Scotsman, Stobart Rail, DB Schenker, Fastline (limited edition of 504).	DCC Sound and DCC onboard versions available, others DCC ready (recent models are fitted with a 21-pin socket rather than the 8-pin one found in earlier models). 66/9 variant released in Direct Rail Services and Freightliner liveries. New tooling Announced April 2025.
69 electro-motive diesel	GBRF blue, BR large logo blue, BR green.	DCC Ready, released in 2025. Made under an exclusive agreement with GBRF.
70 General Electric Type 5	Freightliner PowerHaul	DCC ready, fitted with a 21-pin socket.
D16/1 English Electric Type 3	BR Black (Early Emblem)	DCC ready, New Model for 2020

=== Electric locomotives ===
Class	Liveries	Notes
85 "AL 5"	BR Electric Blue With White Roof, BR Blue	DCC ready, fitted with a 21-pin socket.
90	BR Intercity Swallow, BR Railfreight Grey, Freightliner Green "Powerhaul".	DCC ready, fitted with a 21-pin socket.

=== Diesel multiple units ===
Class	Liveries	Notes
101	BR White and Blue, Network SouthEast	DCC Ready (Network SouthEast model fitted with DCC Sound from factory) At present only 2 car units available.
105	BR Green with Speed Whiskers, BR Green Yellow Warning Panels, BR Blue/Grey	Announced 2008, released Autumn 2010. DCC Ready (8 pin socket, two decoders required).
108	BR Green with Speed Whiskers, BR Green Yellow Warning Panels, BR Blue/Grey, BR Blue (limited edition of 504), Network SouthEast, BR Greater Manchester PTE White/Blue, Strathclyde PTE Orange (limited edition of 510)	DCC Ready (8 pin socket, two decoders required). Two and three car variants available.
117	BR Green with Speed Whiskers, BR Blue/Grey, Network SouthEast	DCC Ready.
121	BR Green with Speed Whiskers, BR Blue/Grey, Network SouthEast	DCC Ready.
150 - "Sprinter"	First North Western, Centro, Arriva Trains Wales, Regional Railways, Provincial 'Sprinter' (bundled only with Dynamis Starter Set), Merseyrail (limited edition of 504), Silverlink (Bachmann Collectors Club limited edition of 504), Provincial revised livery (limited edition of 504), ScotRail 'swoosh' (limited edition of 500).	Released around May 2009. DCC ready (21 pin socket, one decoder required).
158 - "Express Sprinter"	Regional Railways, Regional Railways EXPRESS, West Yorkshire PTE, Alphaline Wales & West, Central Trains, First North Western, Northern Spirit, Alphaline Wessex Trains, ScotRail, Northern Rail, First TransPennine Express, First ScotRail former ScotRail 'swoosh' livery, First ScotRail 'Barbie' livery (limited edition of 504, full production version due 2009), Arriva Trains Wales, Iarnród Éireann as an Irish Rail Class 2700 DMU (exclusive to train set)	Two and Three car units available
159 - "South Western Turbo"	Network SouthEast, Stagecoach South West Trains NSE variant, South West Trains	Network SouthEast is only livery currently available new.
166 - "Network Express Turbo"	Network SouthEast, Thames Trains, First Great Western Link, First Great Western 2006 'neon'	
168 - "Clubman"	Chiltern Railways	Utilises the Class 170 tooling. No alterations have been made to portray the differences between a Class 170 and 168.
170 - "Turbostar"	Central Trains, Midland Mainline, South West Trains, ScotRail, First ScotRail, One, CrossCountry, London Midland, ScotRail Saltire	Two and three car units available. The models cab fronts are based on original style Turbostars with smaller light clusters. A First TransPennine Express model was advertised in the 2008 range and was to have been the first 170 to come with a DCC chip pre-fitted, however it has been dropped from the range.
171 - "Turbostar"	Southern (2 x limited editions of 504)	Utilises the Class 170 tooling. Second weathered limited edition was advertised as a 170 portraying the unit before it was reclassified to class 171 but was delivered as 171724. No alterations have been made to portray the differences between a Class 170 and 171 except the side destinations displays. This was exclusive to Modelzone.
205 - "Thumper"	BR Green with small yellow panels, BR Blue, Network South East, (Kernow Model Centre editions included: Connex South Eastern, BR Blue & Grey and BR Green (With warning V) liveries)	Originally released in 2012 exclusive to Kernow Model Centre but as of 2020 part of main range.
220 - "Voyager"	Virgin CrossCountry, CrossCountry	
221 - "Super Voyager"	Virgin CrossCountry, CrossCountry	Tilting train.
MPV	Railtrack, Network Rail	Announced 2008, released 2011. DCC on board and DCC Ready (21 pin socket, one decoder required).
251/261 - "Blue Pullman"	Midland Pullman, Nanking Blue and Grey Western Pullman, Reverse Grey and Blue	Announced mid-2010. DCC on board. DCC Sound version available. Western region modified sets were subsequently available from 2020.
British Rail Derby Lightweight	BR Green with Speed Whiskers, BR Green with Yellow Warning Panels, BR Blue.	Announced 2010, released November 2011. DCC Ready (8 pin socket, two decoders required).

=== Electric multiple units ===
Class	Liveries	Notes
350 "Desiro"	Silverlink unbranded blue/grey (Apollo), London Midland	Announced at 2010 Model Rail Scotland; officially announced for 2010. Unbranded blue/grey model released November 2011. DCC Ready (21-pin socket). London Midland models delayed by half a year.
411 "4-CEP"	BR Green, BR Green with yellow warning panels, BR Blue/Grey	Announced at 2006 Bachmann trade show; officially announced for 2007; released early December 2009. DCC Ready (21 pin socket, one decoder required). Model is of the units in their unrefurbished form.
412 "4-BEP"	BR Green, BR Blue/Grey	Released 2020; DCC Ready (21 pin socket), Model is of the units in unrefurbished form.
414 "2-HAP"	BR Green, Network South East	Released 2020; DCC Ready (21 pin socket)
416 "2-EPB"	BR Green, BR Green with yellow warning panels, BR Blue/Grey	Announced at 2009 Warley show; officially announced for 2009; released 2011. DCC Ready (21 pin socket, one decoder required).
London Underground S7 and S8 Stock	Available in 4 models. 4 car motorised train pack and 4 individual unpowered cars. Bonus features include addition of lights and realistic train door sounds	Exclusive to London Transport Museum announced for release in 2015.

=== Steam Locomotives ===
Class	Liveries	Notes	DCC?
Midland Railway 1252 Class	BR Black, LMS Black and Midland Railway Maroon		DCC Ready
Midland Railway 1377 Class	BR Black, LMS Black, LMS Crimson, SDJR Blue		DCC Ready
LMS Fairburn 2-6-4T	BR Black, LMS Black, Caledonian Railway Blue		DCC Ready
LB&SCR E4 Class	LB&SCR Umber, SR Green and BR Black	No. 473 Birch Grove produced for Bachmann Collectors Club	DCC Ready
SE&CR C Class	SECR Lined Green, SECR Dark Grey, SR Black and BR Black	No. 689 in SECR Dark Grey produced for Bachmann Collectors Club	DCC Ready
GCR Class 9J	GCR Lined Black, LNER Goods Black, BR Black	No. 316 in Great Central lined black produced for Bachmann Collectors Club	DCC Ready
LB&SCR H2 Class	SR Green and BR Black		DCC Ready
GWR 6400 Class	GWR Green, BR Black and BR Green		DCC Ready
LMS Stanier Mogul	LMS Black and BR Black		DCC Ready
SE&CR N Class	SECR Dark Grey, SR Malachite Green, SR Maunsell Green and BR Lined Black		DCC Ready
LNER Class D11	GCR Green, LNER Green, LNER Black and BR Black		DCC Ready
LNER Class O4 GWR 3000 Class ROD 2-8-0	GCR Black, LNWR Black, ROD Black, LNER Black, BR Black (Early Emblem and Late Crest) and GWR Green		DCC Ready
S&DJR Class 7F	SDJR Blue and BR Black		DCC Ready
Midland Railway 3835 Class	LMS Black and BR Black		DCC Ready
GWR 5700 Class	GWR Green, London Transport Maroon, GGMSWR Ochre and BR Black		DCC Ready
Midland Railway 1000 Class	MR Maroon, LMS Black and BR Black		DCC Ready
SR USA Class	USATC Black, SR Black, BR Black, Longmoor Military Railway Blue, National Coal Board Black, Keighley & Worth Valley Railway Ochre and BR Green.	Model Rail Exclusive	DCC Ready
GWR 3700 Class	GWR Green	Limited Edition of 3440 City of Truro.	DCC Ready
GWR 4900 Class	GWR Green, BR Green/Black		DCC Ready
GWR Dukedog Class	GWR Green and BR Black		DCC Ready
GWR 2251 Class	GWR Green, BR Green/Black	Originally a Mainline model. Revised version introduced with a new chassis design and improved body tooling.	DCC Ready.
LMS Jubilee Class	BR Green, LMS Maroon	DCC Sound version available	DCC Ready, On Board
LMS Parallel Boiler Scot	BR Green, LMS Maroon	See LMS Royal Scot Class	
L&YR Class 5	L&YR Black, LMS Maroon, LMS Black and BR Black	No. 1008 produced for the National Railway Museum	DCC Ready
LNWR Webb Coal Tank	LNWR Black, LMS Black, BR Black		DCC Ready
LNWR Class G2	BR Black, LMS Black		DCC Ready, On Board
LMS Rebuilt Royal Scot Class	BR Green, LMS Maroon		DCC Ready, On Board
LMS Patriot Class	BR Green, LMS Maroon		DCC Ready, On Board
LMS Hughes Crab	BR Black, LMS Maroon		DCC Ready
LMS Fowler Class 3F Jinty	BR Black, BR Maroon, LMS Crimson, LMS Black and SDJR Blue		DCC On Board
Midland Railway Johnson 0-6-0	BR Black		DCC Ready
LMS Ivatt Class 2 2-6-0	BR Green, BR Black, LMS Black		DCC Ready
LMS Ivatt Class 2 2-6-2T	BR Black, LMS Black, BR Maroon		DCC Ready
LMS Ivatt Class 4 4-6-0	BR Black, LMS		DCC Ready
LNER Class V2	BR Black, BR Green, LNER Green	4771 Green Arrow in LNER Doncaster Green - Part of National Collection.	DCC Ready
LNER Class V1/V3	BR Black, BR Apple Green, LNER Green, LNER Black		DCC Ready
LNER Thompson Class B1	BR Black, LNER Green, LNER Black		DCC Ready
LNER J72 Tank (NER Class E1)	BR Black, LNER Green, LNER Black and NER Green		DCC Ready
LNER Class J39	BR Black, LNER Black		
LNER Class A4	BR Blue, LNER Green, BR Green	60019 Bittern. Body inherited from Brish Trix/Lilliput when Kader acquired the Lilliput range. Hornby produces competitive models. No longer in the range.	DCC Ready
LNER Class K3	BR Black, LNER Black, LNER Green	See GNR Class H4	DCC Ready
LNER Peppercorn Class A1	BR Apple Green, BR Blue, BR Brunswick Green, LNER Green	60163 Tornado released in BR Apple Green 2009/2010 Tornado in works grey livery produced for Bachmann Collectors Club	DCC Ready
LNER Peppercorn Class A2	BR Apple Green, BR Brunswick Green (Early Emblem & Late Crest), LNER Green	60532 Blue Peter produced during production run.	DCC Ready
BR WD Austerity 2-8-0	BR Black		
BR Standard Class 4 2-6-4T	BR Black, BR Green		DCC Ready, On Board
BR Standard Class 9F	BR Black		DCC Ready
BR Standard Class 4 2-6-0	BR Black		DCC Ready, On Board
BR Standard Class 5MT	BR Black, BR Green		DCC Ready
BR Standard Class 3 2-6-2T	BR Black, BR Green		DCC Ready. Released late 2009/2010
GNR Class C1 (large boiler)	GNR Green, LNER Green and BR Black		DCC Ready
ROD 2-8-0	ROD Black and LNWR Black		DCC Ready
LB&SCR H1 class	LB&SCR Brown and SR Green		DCC Ready
Caledonian 812 Class	Caledonian Railway Blue, LMS Black and BR Black	Produced for Rails of Sheffield	DCC Ready
NER Class O	NER Green, LNER Black and BR Black	Produced exclusively for TMC (The Model Center)	DCC Ready
LNWR Improved Precedent Class	LNWR Black, LMS Crimson, LMS Black	Produced exclusively for Rails of Sheffield and Locomotion Models	DCC Ready
GWR 9400 Class	GWR Green, BR Black, One version exclusive to Locomotion Models		DCC Ready

=== OO9 Gauge Steam Locomotives ===
Class	Liveries	DCC?
Baldwin Class 10-12-D	ROD Black, WHR Black, ALR Crimson and ALR Black, WHR Maroon, GVR Black, SDR Black & SR Green	DCC Ready
Dinorwic Alice Class	Blue, Red, Black & Green	DCC Ready
Ffestiniog Railway Double Fairlie	FR Lined Green, FR Lined Maroon	DCC Ready
Penrhyn Main Line Class	Penrhyn Quarry Lined Black	DCC Ready

=== OO9 Gauge Diesel Locomotives ===
Class	Liveries	DCC?
Baguley-Drewry 70hp Diesel Locomotive	Yellow, Green, crimson, ICI orange and grey and industrial sands white	DCC Ready

== Rivals ==
- Hornby Railways - Bachmann and Hornby are the two largest OO manufacturers in locomotives, wagons, coaches, scenics and more
- Dapol - Produces models of locomotives and wagons in OO and N
- Heljan - Produces a number of locomotives and wagons
- Rails of Sheffield - Recently started producing OO locomotives with Dapol and Bachmann Branchline
- Accurascale- produces models in OO and O.
- Rapido trains UK- produces models in OO and N.
