= Hellifield engine shed =

Disused locomotive shed in North Yorkshire, England

Hellifield Engine Shed
- Interactive map of Hellifield Engine Shed

Location
- Location: Hellifield, North Yorkshire
- Coordinates: 54.0122°N 2.2300°W
- OS grid: SD851575

Characteristics
- Owner: Midland Railway; British Railways
- Type: Steam locomotive

History
- Opened: 1880
- Closed: 17 June 1963
- Original: Midland Railway
- Post-grouping: London Midland and Scottish Railway
- BR region: London Midland
- Former depot code: 30A; 20G; 23B; 24H

Hellifield Engine Shed was a railway locomotive depot adjacent to Hellifield railway station in North Yorkshire, England. The depot opened in 1880 and was closed in 1963. Its main function was to house engines for use on the Settle-Carlisle line.

Hellifield was coded as 30A, 20G, 23B, and 24H and was a sub-shed of first Skipton depot, and latterly under Accrington depot.

== History ==
Hellifield was opened as depot in 1880 and its purpose was the supply of engines for the four lines radiating from Hellifield, though its most important duty was to provide relief and pilot engines for trains running to Carlisle. This was deemed necessary because of the 1-in-100 climb up to Ais Gill. The railway climbs continually from Hellifield to Ais Gill, a section known as the Long Drag, where it attains a height of 1,169 feet (356 m).

The sheds were furnished with a 50 feet (15 m) turntable, made by Cowans & Sheldon at a cost of £325, though it was not ready for when the station and shed opened. This resulted in some locomotives, particularly the Lancashire & Yorkshire Railway owned ones having to run back down the line to Clitheroe in a light engine manoeuvre. The shed was located at the northern end of the station, but could only be accessed by the up line (southwards) towards Skipton.

== Allocations ==
Between 1901 and 1914, the station at Hellifield was dealing with 90 trains per day. Added to this, numerous freight trains called to exchange wagons in the sidings adjacent to the station. As a result, Hellifield had an allocation of 28 locomotives. In LMS days, it was coded as 30A under Skipton, and at the end of the Second World War it had a complement of 30 locomotives.

When nationalisation came about in 1948, the shed was coded as 20G by British Railways. It retained this code until 1950 when it was recoded 23B for one year until 1951. Between 1951 and 1957, it was changed back to 20G and between 1957 and its closure, the shed was coded 24H. Previously having been sub-shedded to Skipton, in its latter years as 24H, it was a sub-shed of Accrington.

== Closure ==
The depot was closed on 17 June 1963. After the depot was closed as an active location for locomotives, British Rail used it to temporarily store locomotives that were destined for the national collection. The LNER Class V2 4771 Green Arrow was stored here in the late 1960s/early 1970s.

The Engine Shed Society state that the pits are still extant, though overgrown and now hard to see from passing trains.
