= Kader Group =

Hong Kong based toy manufacturer

Kader Industrial Company Limited was founded in Hong Kong in 1948 by Ting Hsiung Chao. It was listed on the Hong Kong Stock Exchange in 1985 and presently trades under the name of "Kader Holdings Company Limited".

The company today is one of the world's largest manufacturers of toy and hobby railways, and also has wider manufacturing interests as well as substantial investments in property. The Ting family continues to lead Kader Group.

Kader's initial focus product was to manufacture plastic flashlights, which at the time were a novelty.

== Present day ==
Today the companies main facilities are located in Dongguan, PRC. Manufacturing operations are divided into two categories Original Design Manufacturer (the contract manufacturing of goods for the brand/design owner); and manufacturing of precision model railroads designed and marketed by Kader group companies. ODM customers have included toys for Disney, Hasbro and Mattel; and electrical goods housings for National Panasonic.

=== Model Railways ===
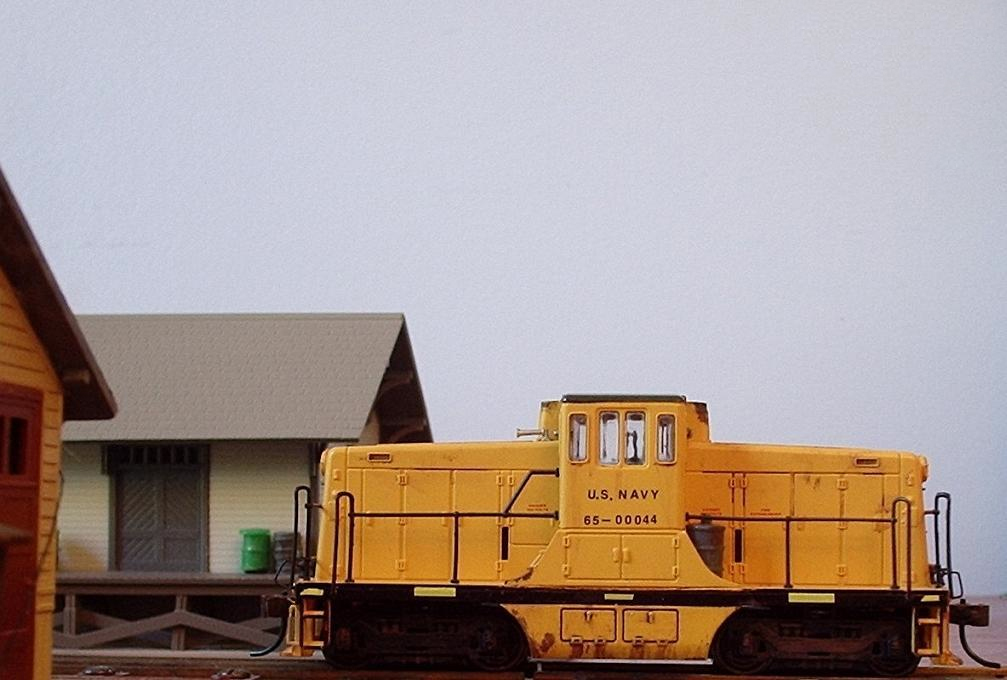
A center cab switcher made by Bachmann's Spectrum.

In 1984 Kader acquired its customer 'Bachmann Bros.', which had suffered from falling profits and financial difficulties. Kader changed the name to Bachmann Industries and used the brand to draw in North American customers.

As well as introducing its own brands to North America, Kader under the Bachmann brand built itself up as the largest volume seller of model railways by purchasing other failing companies, using the Bachmann name to front a series of purchases in the rest of the world to combat the then poor perceptions of Hong Kong-based production quality. In 1989 a European division was set up initially reusing the moulds previously used for the Palitoy 'Mainline' UK model railway products to create the Bachmann Branchline models. 1992 it bought Liliput of Austria and in 2000 it bought Graham Farish. In 2007 it acquired the assets of Williams models and launched "Williams by Bachmann".

Kader's business model for each take over, from its original purchase of Bachmann to the present day, is to buy a perceived quality brand in the target market or country. The company then closes local in-country production facilities, and then improves quality by re-engineering the models in Hong Kong, and reduces cost by producing the models in mainland China.

Presently Bachmann offers trains in H0 scale, N scale, On30, and G scale around the world, in addition to buildings and accessories:

- North America – Bachmann Industries, Williams by Bachmann
- United Kingdom – Bachmann Branchline offer 00 gauge models, while Graham Farish produce British scale (1:148) N gauge models under the Graham Farish name
- Europe – Liliput and Palitoy
- China – from 2000, Bachmann also started producing Chinese outline models under the Bachmann China name, opening the world's first Bachmann speciality retail shop in Shanghai in 2005

In November 2008, Kader also took over Sanda Kan, its nearest competitor for precision model railway items in the Hong-Kong based ODM contract manufacturing business. Sanda Kan's biggest client had been Bachmann's dominant rival in the UK market Hornby Railways, which had concentrated production there since 1997–2001. The company also manufactured for Lionel, Atlas, Life-Like, Brawa, Märklin, and of the order of 50 other model train companies. However it had been experiencing severe production and debt problems after a takeover by J.P. Morgan private equity. The merger was hailed by one producer as "a marriage made in heaven", although it is not yet clear what long-term effects the concentration of the ownership of production will have. Kader announced that Sanda Kan would continue as a distinct entity, and that Sanda Kan's original owner W.S. Ting had agreed to come back to lead the company. Hornby's managing director pronounced the acquisition "a welcome outcome [that] removes the uncertainty over the future of Sanda Kan". Most Hornby production remained with Sanda Kan until 2015 when Hornby paid £0.5m to end its relationship with the Chinese supplier, and secure the return of tooling and moulds. Hornby had experienced supply chain problems, with as little as 60% of goods being delivered on time.

=== 1993 Thailand factory fire ===
On May 10, 1993, there was a major fire at the Kader Toy Factory, a joint venture, in Thailand. 188 people were killed, and over 500 were seriously injured. Most of the victims were young female workers from rural families. More people were killed in this industrial accident than in the Triangle Shirtwaist Factory fire; making it one of the worst industrial disasters in history.

== Real estate ==
Kader also owns real estate in the US, and is the owner of the Everline Resort and Spa, located at Palisades Tahoe in Olympic Valley, California.
