= Bachmann Industries =

Model railroading company in Hong Kong

Bachmann Industries Ltd. (Bachmann Brothers, Inc.)
- Type: Private company
- Industry: Ivory, celluloid, plastics, and accessories for model railroading
- Founded: 1833; 193 years ago Philadelphia, Pennsylvania, U.S.
- Founder: Henry Carlisle
- Headquarters: Hamilton, Bermuda; Hong Kong, China
- Key people: Henry Carlisle, Henry G.(father of), Henry Edward, and Walter John Bachmann (founders), additional key people include: Joseph Chester Sharpless Crowther, Bayard "Bud" Henry Crowther, Arthur Henry Crowther and Chester Walter Crowther
- Products: Model railway trains
- Revenue: US$146.87 million
- Parent: Kader Industries
- Website: Bachmann Trains

Bachmann Industries (Bachmann Brothers, Inc.) is a Bermuda-registered, Chinese-owned company, globally headquartered in Hong Kong; specialising in model railroading.

Founded in Philadelphia, Pennsylvania, the home of its North American headquarters, Bachmann is today part of the Kader group, whose model products are made at a Chinese Government joint-venture plant in Dongguan, China. In the past, Bachmann specialised in entry level train sets. In 1988, the Spectrum line of high-quality, detailed models was introduced to cater to more experienced hobbyists. In the past few years, Bachmann has retooled most of its product line, increasing the quality of its standard line products and discontinuing most of the Spectrum line. Many of the Spectrum products have been slightly modified and are now sold as higher-quality standard line models. Bachmann produces models in HO scale, N scale (1:160 and 1:148), On30, 00 gauge, HOn30 (H0 scale on N tracks) and G scale. They also own the Williams line of tinplate O gauge trains and related products. The turnover for Bachmann model trains for the year ended on 31 December 2006 was approximately $146.87 million, a slight increase of 3.36% as compared to 2005.

== History ==
Founded in 1833 by Henry Carlisle, the company originally specialized in vanity products such as parasol handles and Spanish combs made of ivory horns. Its target market was aristocracy in the American South and Louisiana. After the Civil War it continued to make other types of hair ornaments and handles for walking canes now out of Tortoise shell and ivory. In 1899, Carlisle's firm merged with a competing firm run by Henry G. Bachmann and changed its name to Bachmann Bros. By 1902, Bachmann Bros. started to use celluloid for its products and by 1912 introduced optical frames that were made from it. It was around this time that Bachmann Bros. began experimenting in plastic. In 1927, shortly before they moved to their final Philadelphia address, they became the first American manufacturer of sunglasses. The line, "Solarex" would become very popular worldwide and would later be purchased by the U.S. Army and United States Army Air Forces for their personnel during WWII. During WWII Bachmann Bros. was awarded the coveted Army-Navy "E" Award for outstanding contribution to the war effort by an American company.

Other notable products included Birds of the World Model kits, Plasticville U.S.A., shooting glasses for Winchester Repeating Arms Company (now the U.S. Repeating Arms Company), and Stein Eriksen ski goggles.

== Model railroading products ==
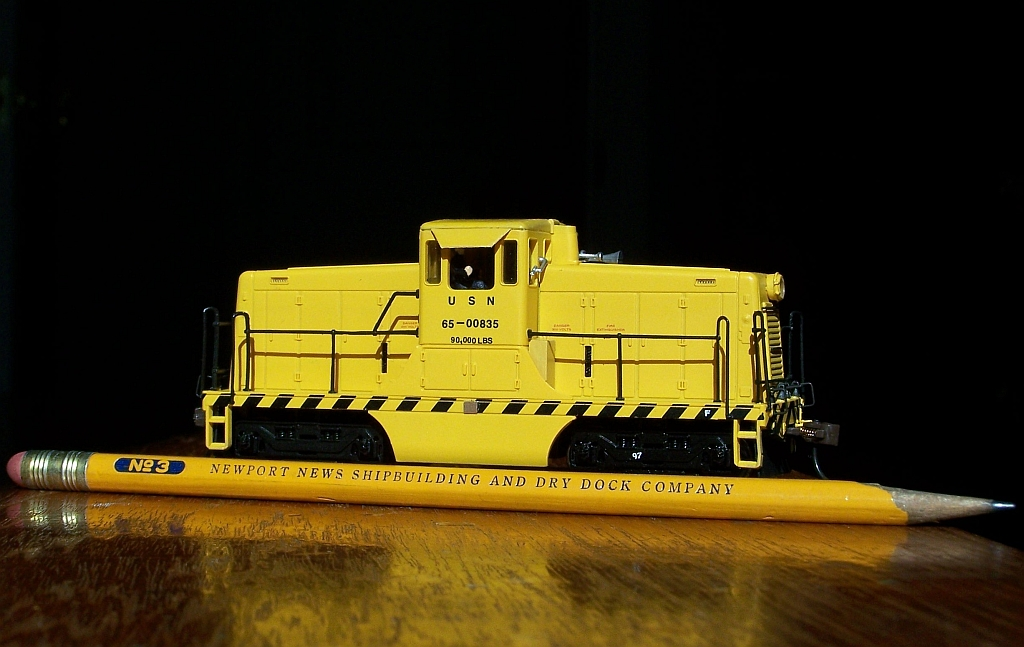
HO Scale Bachmann Spectrum center cab switcher.

Because of the sudden popularity of N scale model railroading around 1966, Bachmann entered the trains market by starting its N scale trains products in June 1968, with cars packaged in white jewel cases. However, problems of initial run led to a retooling the following year. In 1970, Bachmann entered the HO trains market. A second retooling occurred around 1973, when trains started to be packaged in black jewel cases . In 1978, Bachmann changed its logo to the present one. Trains began to be packaged in blue jewel cases. Bachmann Bros. held exclusive licenses to produce models of trains manufactured by Budd Company passenger trains and United Aircraft's high-speed train.

Several product lines are produced under the Bachmann name including:

=== Spectrum ===
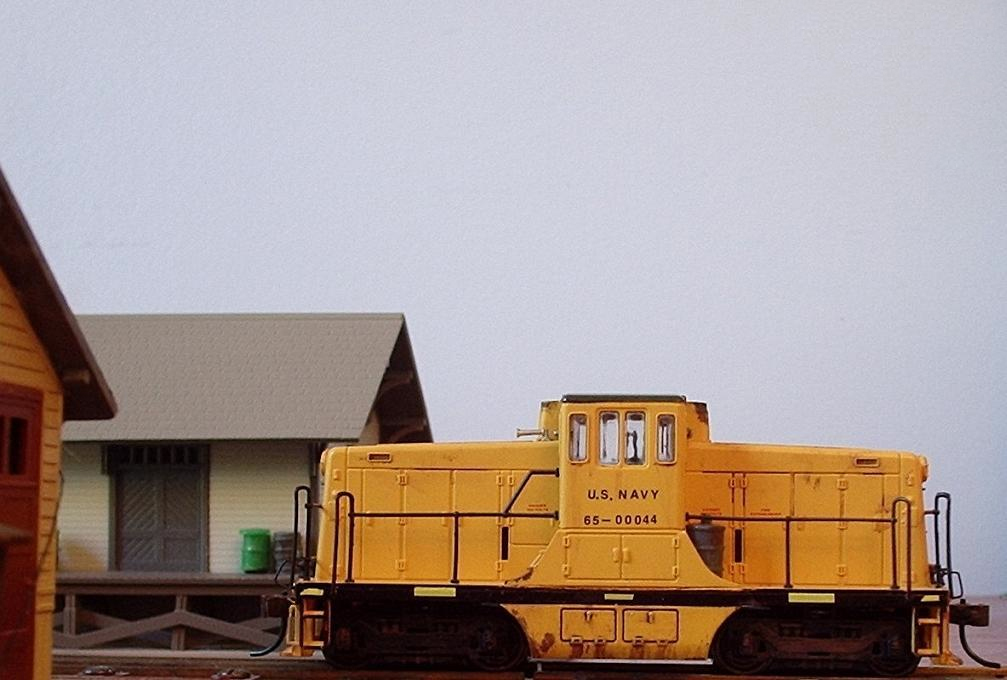
A Bachmann Spectrum 44Ton.

In 1988, Bachmann introduced the "Spectrum" line of higher quality equipment, including updated motors, more realistic paint schemes, and better detail. Spectrum was considered a totally different company from the regular Bachmann company. The initial offering was a GE 44 Ton Diesel. Later on, the Spectrum line expanded to include a Pennsylvania Railroad K-4 Class Pacific, an EMD GP30, and a General Electric Dash 8-40CW. In 1998, Bachmann introduced their Spectrum HO scale 2-8-0 Consolidation, which was selected "Model of the Year" by the readers of Model Railroader magazine. By 2000, Spectrum was no longer considered a separate product and became one of the Bachmann product lines, as Spectrum was finally included in Bachmann's regular catalogues.

Bachmann began a period of phasing out the Spectrum brand in the 2010s, moving most of the products in the line to the Standard Line (sometimes with minor changes), but has announced the release of a re-tooled Spectrum 80-ton 3-truck Shay in their 2026 catalogue .

=== Big Haulers and Spectrum large scale models ===
In 1988, Bachmann started to produce large scale (also known as G Scale or garden scale) train sets called the Big Haulers. They were first introduced in sets consisting of a locomotive, one or two freight cars and a caboose, Set 90,100 was the first set. The locomotives were battery powered and were radio controlled. In 1989, they began making train sets using track powered electric locomotives. In 1989, Bachmann also began selling locomotives, freight cars, and passenger cars as separate items. Since the early years Bachmann introduced a high quality line of prototype 1:20.3 locomotives and rolling stock in their Spectrum Line.

=== Williams ===
In 2007, Bachmann purchased the Williams Electric Trains company, which has allowed the company to expand into the O scale market. Williams offers a more "traditional" train layout reminiscent of the 1950s, with diesel engines, and rolling stock similar in look to the same O gauge products introduced by Lionel Trains during the golden ages of model railroads. Steam engines include semi-scale and scale representations. Williams by Bachmann has produced a new 44 ton switcher that has been introduced in 2015 the company still remains a value leader in the O gauge segment.

=== Today and DCC ===
In an effort to fill the quality gap between the Spectrum brand and the regular Bachmann trains, Bachmann introduced a mid-ranged "Bachmann plus" series in 1992 when production was moved to China. Eventually the entire standard product line would be upgraded to the quality level of the plus series, which led to the drop of the plus series and the birth of the current silver series in 1997. Bachmann doubled the MSRP of its products, and cars are now packaged in clear plastic display jewel cases. In 2001, Bachmann started to produce trains in On30 scale (O scale on HO tracks). In 2002, Bachmann introduced its Thomas & Friends range in H0 scale. In 2007, a new line of structures was released. In 2010, Bachmann released several Garden Scale models of Thomas & Friends characters, a range which has seen steady releases since. In 2019, it was announced that the Thomas license would also see releases in N scale beginning in 2020.

Since 2006 Bachmann has been concentrating on implementing a Digital Command Control ("DCC") system and products in its product lines, with the help and partnership of the German company, Lenz Elektronik, GmbH. Bachmann released its Dynamis DCC system in 2007 which enabled Bachmann to catch up technologically with other DCC companies. Currently, Bachmann's HO scale Spectrum line offers DCC on-board options, while the vast majority of its N scale Spectrum lines are DCC-ready.

=== Plasticville ===
Following the war's end, Bachmann released "Plasticville USA", an assemble yourself kit of homes, stores, and other buildings to enhance train layouts. Plasticville USA products are still popular accessories for Lionel and American Flyer trains. Bachmann's Plasticville products, originally in O scale, and later expanded to HO scale, and N scale were originally manufactured by Bachmann in Philadelphia, but later manufactured in Hong Kong. They have been made exclusively in China by plastics moulding manufacturer Kader Holdings Company Limited since 1999. The hobby of collecting Plasticville has increased in recent years to the point that the Plasticville Collectors Association was founded in 1999 and incorporated in 2001.

=== E-Z Track ===
Originally like most other train manufacturers, Bachmann's train sets used conventional snap-track (originally in brass, then switching to steel in the early 1980s.) In 1994, Bachmann introduced E-Z track, which featured HO track built into a moulded plastic roadbed that could be assembled like typical HO track. This allowed for operating HO trains on the floor without worry of dust, lint and carpet fibres, though traditional tabletop layouts could also be designed using this track system.

While integrated-roadbed track was not invented by Bachmann (foreign train manufacturers such as Kato Precision Railroad Models and Märklin Trains all had their own types of roadbed track), the E-Z Track was still new and innovative to the North American HO train market. Originally offered only in steel, a nickel-silver version of the track line came out in 1996, and a wide variety of track length and turnout selections became available in the line, including E-Z Command DCC turnouts. After the success of the HO track line, E-Z Track was also made available in N scale as well.

Train sets manufactured by Athearn also come with E-Z Track, as they do not make their own HO track.

== Other products ==
During the 1960s, Bachmann produced plastic models of animals (Animals of the World series, Birds of the World series, and Dogs of the World series) called Nature Craft Kits. They also produced their own Mini-planes, Slot cars (to compete better with former rival Tyco Toys's own HO-scale trains and slot cars) marketed in both HO and a slightly smaller version of 1/32 scale cars and sets, with 1/32 scale track purchased from Strombecker Corporation, whom by the early 1970s closed down its slot car business; military models (with Fujimi) that include fighter planes, helicopters, and Tanks; and toy robots called "Toys of Tomorrow" (with Tomy). Bachmann would drop the toy robots within a couple of years. The Bachmann-Fujimi models would be dropped during the 1970s. Bachmann dropped Slot Cars and Mini-Planes from its product lines after the Kader takeover (see below) but instead entered the Radio-controlled model market. In 1982 they revived their Nature Craft Kits as Birds of the World. By 1987 they have dropped all other toys and only concentrated on Model Trains and Accessories. In 1998 Bachmann did try to sell a short lived product, a radio controlled motorcycle.

Bachmann's Mini-planes list included several commercial airline models, such as Boeing 707 in American Airlines, Pan American World Airways, Trans World Airlines and fictional Bachmann Airlines marking, Convair CV880 in Delta Air Lines and TWA marking, Boeing 727 in Delta, Eastern Airlines TWA and United Airlines marking, Douglas DC-9 in Delta, Eastern and TWA marking, Douglas DC-8 in United and Japan Airlines marking, Boeing 747 in Japan Airlines, Pan Am and Lufthansa marking, Douglas DC-10 in American marking, Ford Tri-motor in TWA marking, and Douglas DC-3 in American Airlines marking.

== Kader acquisition ==
In light of dwindling interest in model railroading, the Crowther brothers decided, in 1981, to sell to their manufacturer, the Kader Group. Kader changed the name to Bachmann Industries and used the new brand to expand worldwide, such as the European market. It is also part of the strategy to take over other failing companies in Europe and put them under one single name. The packaging changed from plastic jewel cases to white paper boxes with cellophane window. Starting from 1982 Bachmann began to slowly retool individual product lines one by one. A typical example would be the replacement of metal gears to cheaper plastic ones in the Diesel locomotives. By 1992, all cars were manufactured in China.

== Global expansion ==
As well as introducing its own brands to North America, Kader, under the Bachmann brand, built itself up as the largest volume seller of model railways by purchasing other failing companies, using the Bachmann name to front a series of purchases in the rest of the world to combat the then poor perceptions of Hong Kong-based production quality.

By 1985, Bachmann had established agencies in Corcieux, France, and also in Bologna, Italy.

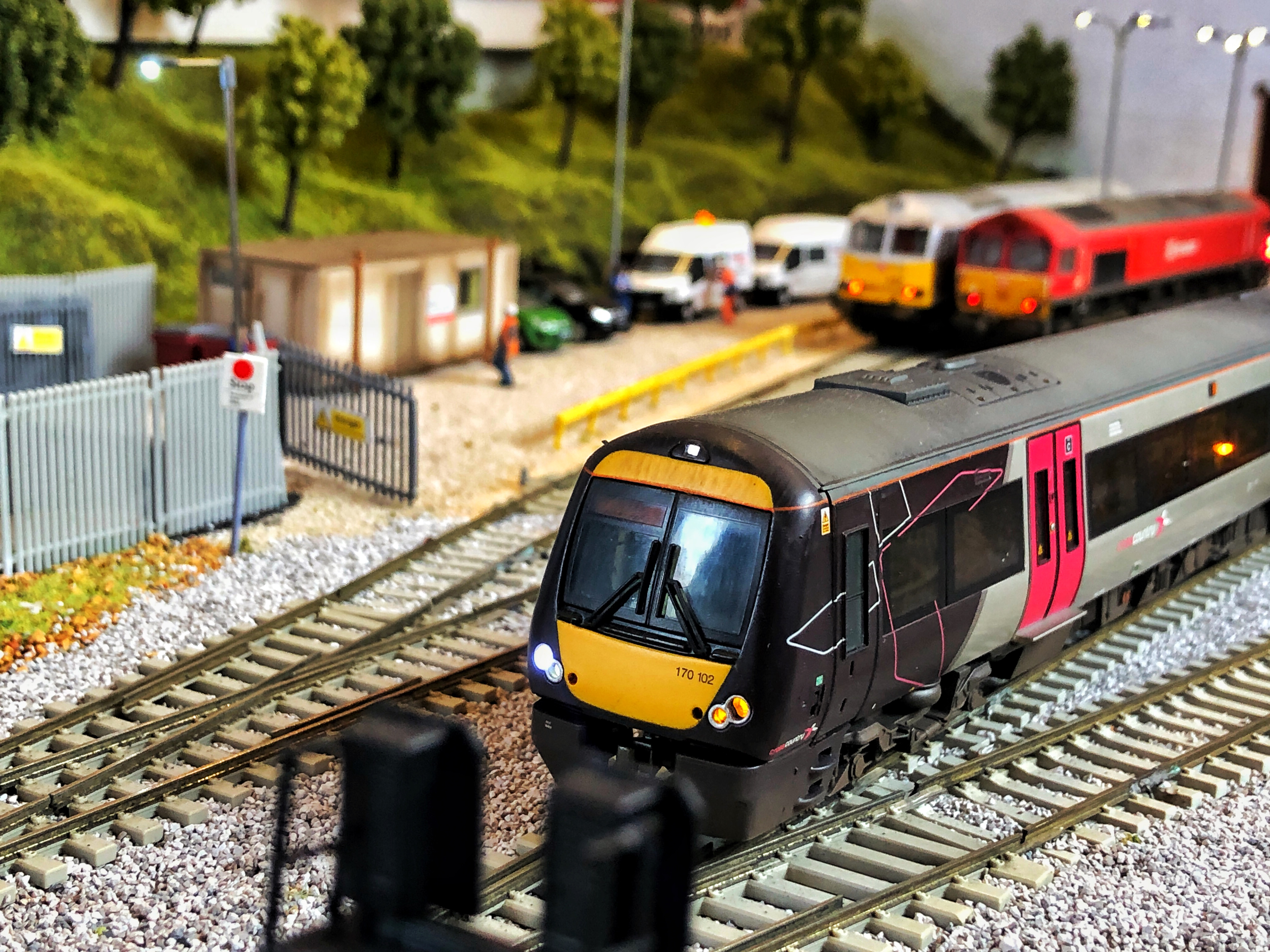
Bachmann Branchline Class 170

In 1989, a European division was set up initially reusing the moulds previously used for the Palitoy Mainline model railway products to create the Bachmann Branchline models. It took over Palitoy's location and established its European headquarters in Barwell, Leicestershire, England, which continues today as the Bachmann UK headquarters.

In 1991, Bachmann established a sales office in Ontario, Canada, but had it closed down in 1996.

In 1992, it bought Liliput of Austria, and established its Continental Europe headquarters in Fürth, Germany. In 1997 it moved to Altdorf bei Nürnberg, Germany, which continues today as the German Liliput headquarters.

In 2000 it bought Graham Farish.

Bachmann started to work with the Chinese National Railway in 1999, and in 2000 it started to produce its first model "East Wind 11 Diesel". Chinese outline models under the Bachmann China name, opening the world's first Bachmann speciality retail shop in Shanghai in 2005. Bachmann China is based in Shanghai.

Kader's business model for each take over, from its original purchase of Bachmann to the present day, is to buy a perceived quality brand in the target market or country. The company then closes local in-country production facilities. Armed with state-of-the-art manufacturing machines and AutoCAD systems, Bachmann then improves quality by re-engineering the models in Hong Kong, and reduces cost by producing the models in its jointly owned plant in Dongguan, China.

== International ==
Bachmann sells model trains in HO scale, N scale (1:160 and 1:148), On30, 00 gauge, HOn30 (HO scale on N tracks) and G scale around the world, in addition to buildings and accessories:

- North America – Bachmann Industries HO scale, N scale (1:160), On30 and G scale. Plasticville O scale and S scale. Williams (O scale).
- United Kingdom – Bachmann Europe Plc offer 00 gauge models under the Branchline name, and British scale (1:148) N gauge models under the Graham Farish name.
- Europe – Liliput HOn30 and HO scale.
- China – Bachmann China HO scale.
- Bachmann UK and Bachmann Europe sell G scale models by Aristo-Craft.
