= Culgaith railway station =

Former railway station in Cumbria, England

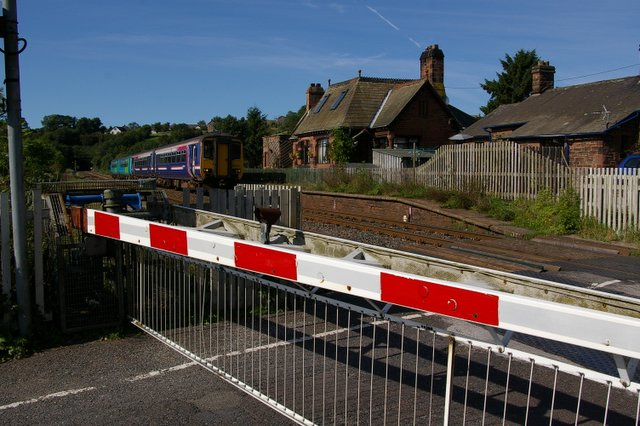
- Culgaith station

General information
- Location: Westmorland and Furness; England
- Coordinates: 54.656°N 2.606°W
- Grid reference: NY60942918
- Platforms: 2

Other information
- Status: Disused

History
- Original company: Midland Railway
- Post-grouping: London Midland and Scottish Railway

Key dates
- 1 April 1880: Opened
- 4 May 1970: Closed
Location
- Location within the former Eden District Location within Cumbria

Culgaith railway station served the village of Culgaith in Cumberland (now in Cumbria), England from 1880 to 1970.

== History ==
The Settle-Carlisle Line is open however and the nearby level crossing and associated semaphore signalling are at present still operated through the Culgaith signal box. The station was built by the Midland Railway and opened in 1880. The station was designed by the Midland Railway company architect John Holloway Sanders. It closed when local stopping trains over the Settle-Carlisle Line were withdrawn in May 1970.

The Settle-bound (up) station building (which sits on a surviving portion of the southbound platform) has been converted into a private dwelling. The nearby garden centre includes buildings that were once used to pack hampers for those heading north on the railway for pheasant shoots, deer stalking, etc. in Scotland. The station master's cottage has also survived, now in private hands.

The buildings possessed a completely different appearance to all other stations on the Settle - Carlisle line due to it being built four years after the others; it was designed by John Holloway Sanders and is of style known as Derby Gothic. The Station Master had a small cottage originally meant for a crossing keeper, rather than the normal substantial house. The Midland Railway hadn't intended to build a station serving the village until the local vicar objected. A local stone was used.

The signalbox is a Midland Railway type 4a design, built in 1908, and controls the first level crossing on the line heading northwards, the only other level crossing being at Low House, just north of Armathwaite. The 661-yard (604 m) Culgaith Tunnel lies nearby.

A serious accident occurred just to the north of here in March 1930, when the 8:05 am stopping passenger train from Hellifield to Carlisle collided with a stationary engineers train that was engaged in unloading ballast in Waste Bank Tunnel. The driver of the local train and one passenger died in the accident, whilst eight people were injured. The subsequent inquiry report determined that the primary cause of the accident was the passenger train passing the station starting signal at danger and entering the occupied block section ahead; however the flagman (lookout) protecting the ballast train and the Culgaith signalman were also criticised for their actions prior to the accident - the former for improperly removing detonators previously laid to protect the stationary train and the latter for failing to sufficiently check the passenger train at the home signal prior to it entering the station.

The Culgaith Parish plan calls for the re-opening of Culgaith station with an adequate provision for parking.

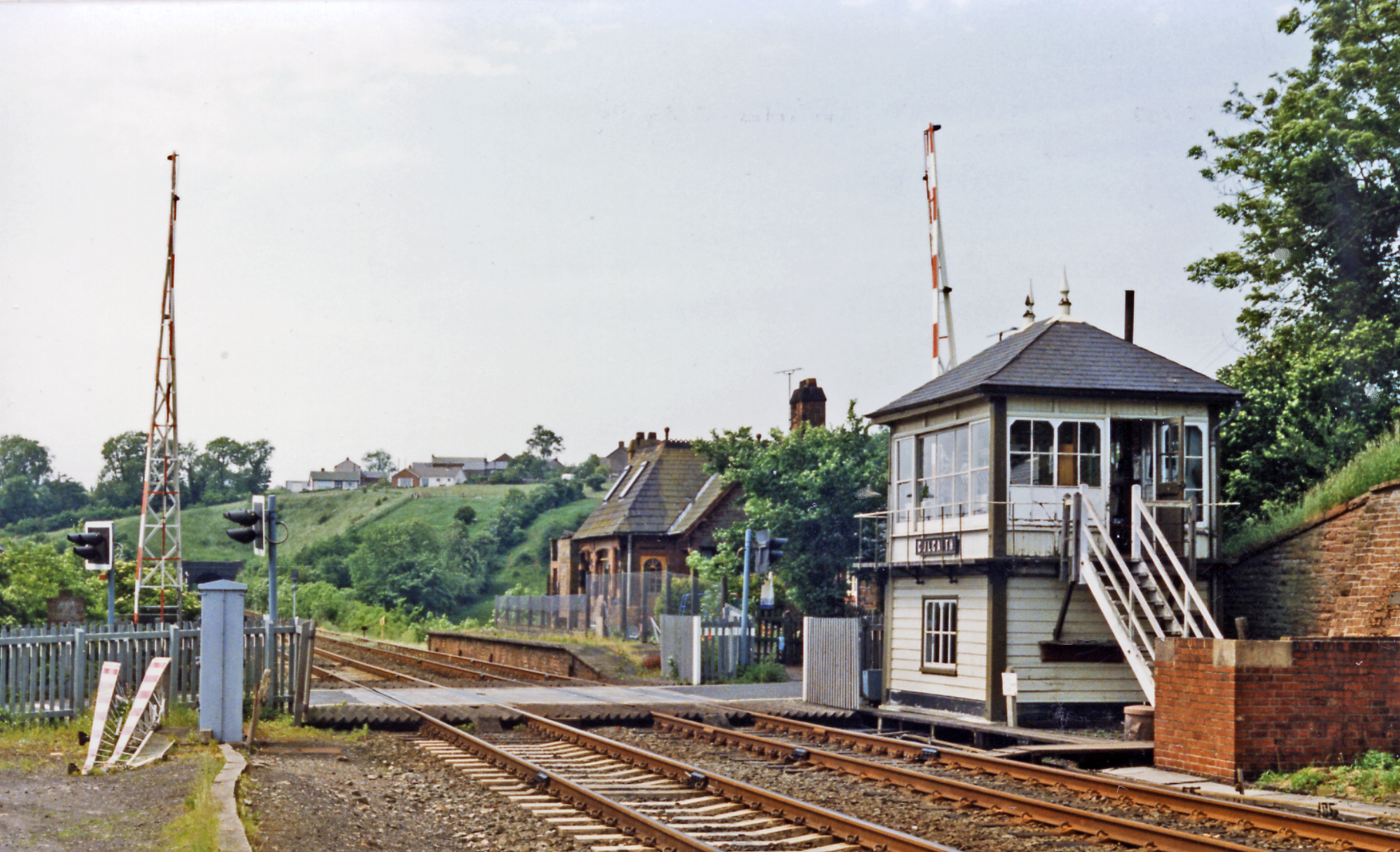
The remains of the station beyond the level crossing in 1986

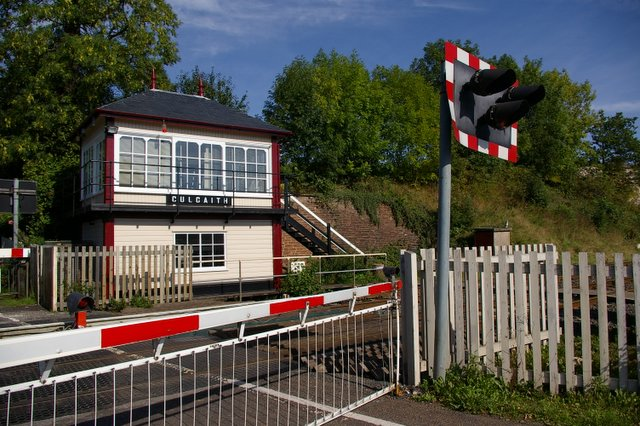
Culgaith level crossing and signal box.

== Stationmasters ==
- James C. Chidgey 1880 - 1883 (afterwards station master at Plumtree)
- C. James 1883 - 1886
- H. Cross 1886 - 1887
- W.G. Fudge 1887 - 1888
- W. Dickinson 1888 - 1889
- J. Smith 1889 - 1892
- J.J. Angus 1892 - 1894
- W.J. Noble 1894 - 1907
- T. Townson 1907 - ca. 1914
- Mr. Phillips until 1920 (afterwards station master at Stratford-on-Avon)
- Albert Daw 1920 - 1929 (afterwards station master at Horton-in-Ribblesdale)
- William Henry Clement 1929 - 1933 (also station master at Newbiggin)

Preceding station	Historical railways	Following station
Langwathby	Midland Railway; Settle-Carlisle Railway	New Biggin
