= Graham Farish =

Model railway manufacturing company

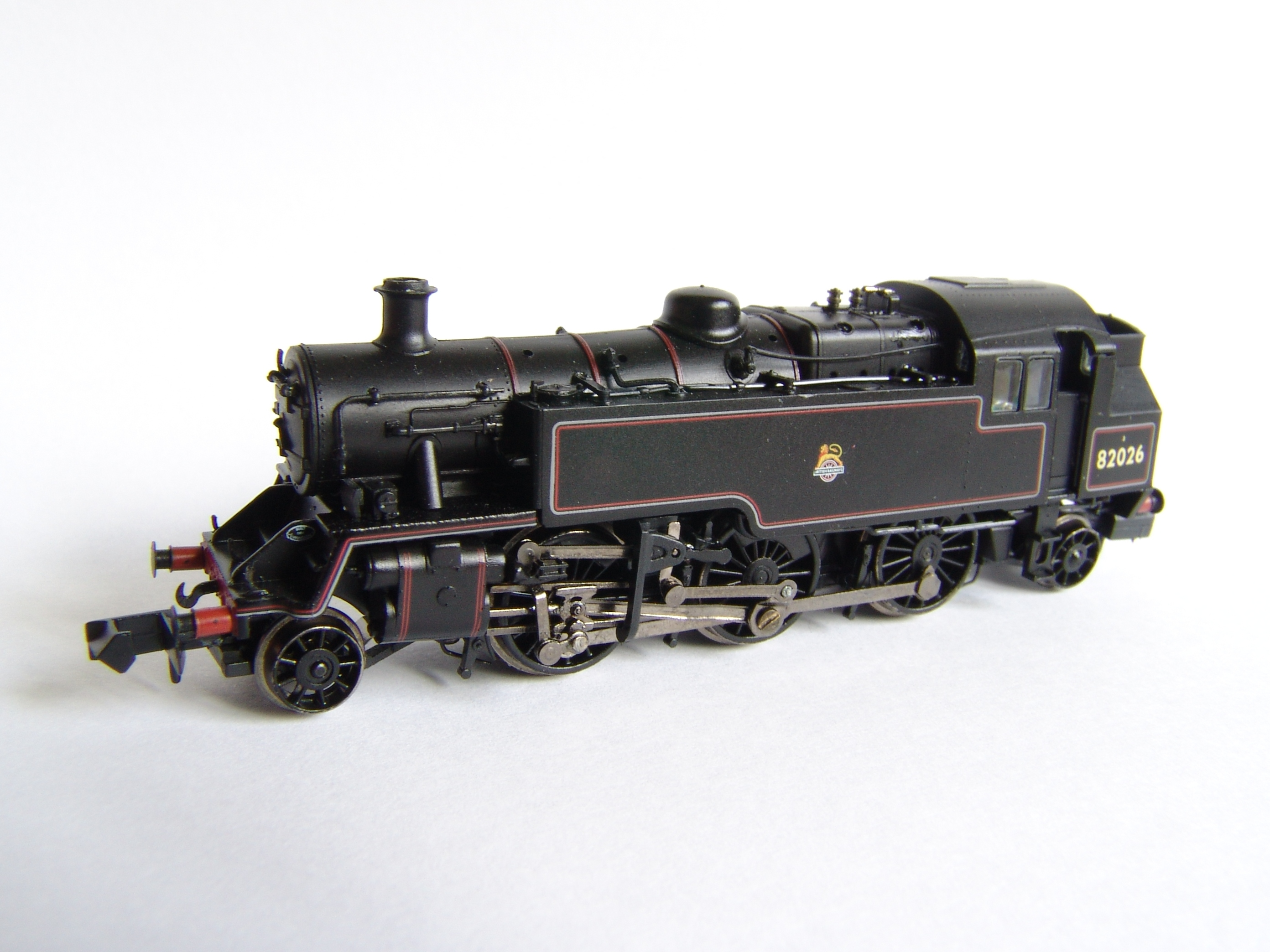
An N gauge model of a BR Standard Class 3 2-6-2T.

Graham Farish is a Chinese-owned brand of N gauge British railway models. The Graham Farish Ltd company was founded in 1928 in the UK and was later bought by Bachmann Industries in 2000. In 2001 all manufacturing moved Kader Group's factory in Hong Kong.

== History ==
The Poole, Dorset based manufacturer of radio parts and kits entered the model railway business in the late 1940s, after the need for radio sets dropped post World War II. The early 1950s models focused on British OO gauge, and they manufactured track, wagons and other supporting items. Many of the more obscure items such as the Graham Farish Coronation figures (by Russell Gammage) from 1953 are considered collector's items.

Originally the OO railway locomotives were powered by an unconventional 2 pole DC electric motor. Many of their diecast items were manufactured with impure mazac, which was all that was available immediately after the War. MZAC is an alloy of Magnesium, Aluminium, Zinc and Copper, in a similar vein to Zamak, which later crumbled due to Zinc pest.

Graham Farish really found its market niche with the arrival of N scale becoming the major supplier of British outline N scale models under the GRAFAR label at a time when the market was shrinking and the other OO gauge players were suffering badly. The initial range in 1970, started with the 9400 Pannier Tank loco, 4 wheel coaches, bogie 'suburban' stock (based on Period 2 LMS suburban stock) and 'Mainline' bogie stock (based on Southern coaches); which have appeared in Caledonian, LMS, GWR, LNER and SR liveries.

After the withdrawal of two competitive mass-market manufacturers, the Italy-based Lima and German based Minitrix, from the late 1980s Grafar was the only major supplier of British outline models in N scale - predicating its withdrawal from the OO scale market in light of greater competition in the developing collector scale market. Early 1970s products were made with three pole armature motors. They were also equipped with all brass gears. In the early 1980s the motors were improved with five pole armatures. At about the same the gears were replaced with white nylon gears, which were only produced for a short time. The nylon gears were replaced with thin black plastic gears; these could suffer from splits, making the models run badly or not at all. These gears were eventually all replaced by thicker plastic gears, to produce a much more reliable and popular range of locomotives. By the late 1990s the GRAHAM FARISH N Gauge Range 350 lines including a huge variety of Locomotives, Coaches, Wagons, Buildings and complete train sets from starter sets all the way up to the 8 ft x 2 ft 6in Magnum Layouts which came complete with all track laid, and a full set of building kits to complete it.

== Takeover by Kader ==
In 2000, Graham Farish was purchased by Bachmann Industries, a subsidiary of Kader Industries. In 2001 all manufacturing was moved to Kader's Hong Kong factory. As a result the Poole facility closed.

Bachmann have since increased the size of the Farish range, by duplicating models introduced to the Bachmann OO range: the detail investigation and pre-production of an original railway vehicle is more detailed for an OO scale model, while for production into N scale there is a simply a down-scaling of most components for production. Hence normally, an OO scale Bachmann Branchline model is followed between 6 months to a year later by an N scale Graham Farish model – with the Voyager diesel set being an example.

Bachmann have introduced a selection of models; the BR Standard 3MT 2-6-2T, the LMS Jubilee, Rebuilt Scot, Black 5, Stanier Class 8F, B1 4-6-0, 4MT 2-6-0, A1 (including new-build Tornado 60163), Period 3 coaches and LMS brake (or guards) van; for the modern era, classes 03, 04, 08 and 14 diesel shunters, class 42 'Warship', class 24 class 37, class 47, class 66 freight locos, prototype Deltic, classes 108, 101, 153 DMU and a variety of freight wagons.

== Comparison ==
Graham Farish products are generally divided into two categories. British made equipment is sought more by collectors because it is older and British, while model railway users generally prefer the more robust and detailed Chinese-built models. The way to tell these two types apart is that UK built models have a yellow sticker on the ends of the box and models built in China have a white sticker on the end.
