= List of horticultural magazines =

This is a list of notable magazines devoted to horticulture and gardening.

== Australia ==
- Australian House & Garden
- Better Homes and Gardens
- Gardening Australia
- NZ Gardener
- South Australian Vigneron and Gardeners' Manual

== Canada ==
- Garden Culture (in English)
- Greenhouse Canada (in English)
- Garden Making (in English)

== United Kingdom ==
- Amateur Gardening - monthly, published by IPC
- BBC Gardeners' World - monthly, published by Immediate Media Company
- Curtis's Botanical Magazine (1787) - now published by Kew Gardens
- The Garden (journal, 1871–1927)
- The Garden - from 1866 as The Journal of the Royal Horticultural Society, under this title since 1975
- Garden Culture - quarterly, published by GC Publishers
- The Gardeners' Chronicle (1841) - now part of Horticulture Week
- Horticulture Week - published by the Haymarket Group
- Hortus (1987) – quarterly, privately published
- The Plantsman (1979) - quarterly, published by the Royal Horticultural Society
- The Orchid Review (1893) - annual, published by the Royal Horticultural Society

== United States ==
- Arnoldia - quarterly, published by the Arnold Arboretum of Harvard University
- Fine Gardening - bimonthly, published by Taunton Press
- MaryJanesFarm - bimonthly, published by MaryJane Butters and Belvoir Media Group

== See also ==
- List of horticulture and gardening books and publications
