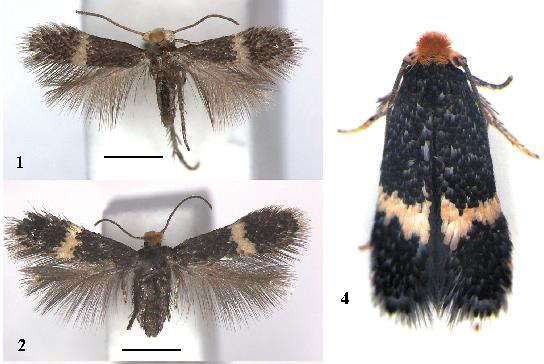

Scientific classification
- Kingdom: Animalia
- Phylum: Arthropoda
- Clade: Pancrustacea
- Class: Insecta
- Order: Lepidoptera
- Family: Nepticulidae
- Genus: Ectoedemia
- Subgenus: Ectoedemia (Fomoria)
- Species: E. festivitatis

Binomial name
- Ectoedemia festivitatis van Nieukerken, 2008

= Ectoedemia festivitatis =

Species of moth

Ectoedemia festivitatis is a moth of the family Nepticulidae. It is found in Nepal, China (Yunnan) and northern Vietnam (Fan Si Pan). It is probably more widespread in south-eastern Asia. The habitat consists of secondary or degraded forest or shrub vegetation in mountainous areas.

== Description ==
The wingspan is 4.0-6.6 mm. Adults are on wing in August, October and from January to March. There are two or more generations per year.

== Biology ==
The larvae feed on shrubby species of Hypericum species (St. John's worts), including Hypericum beanii, H. henryii, H. hookerianum, H. uralum, and possibly H. petiolulatum and H. oblongifolium. They mine the leaves of their host plant.

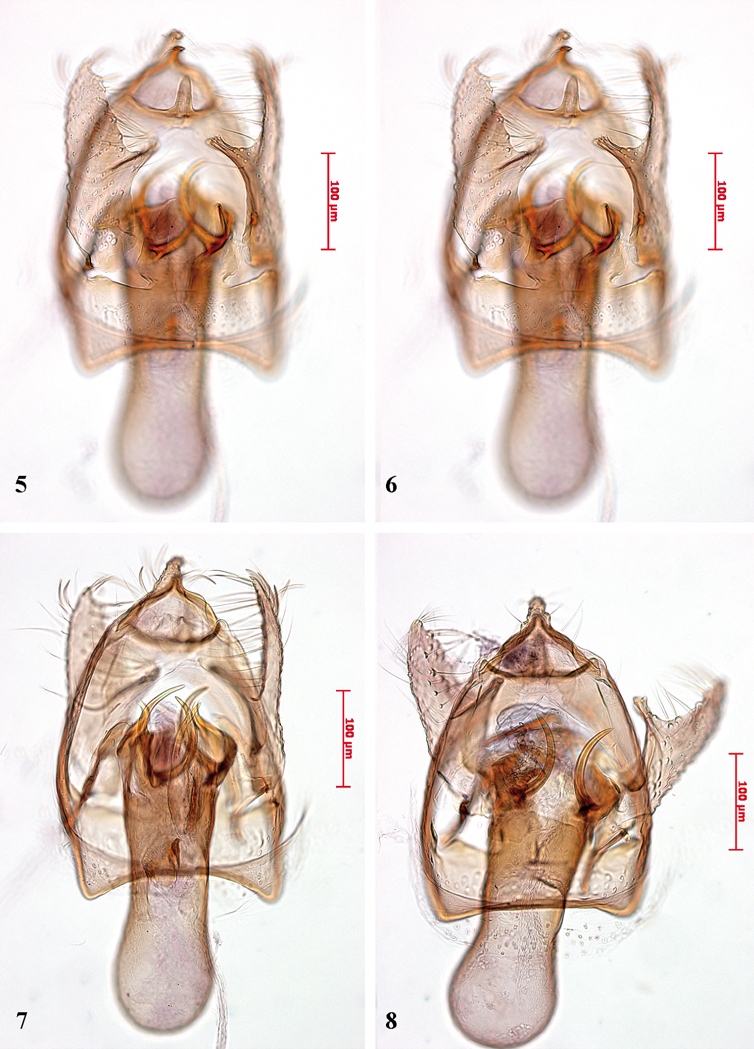

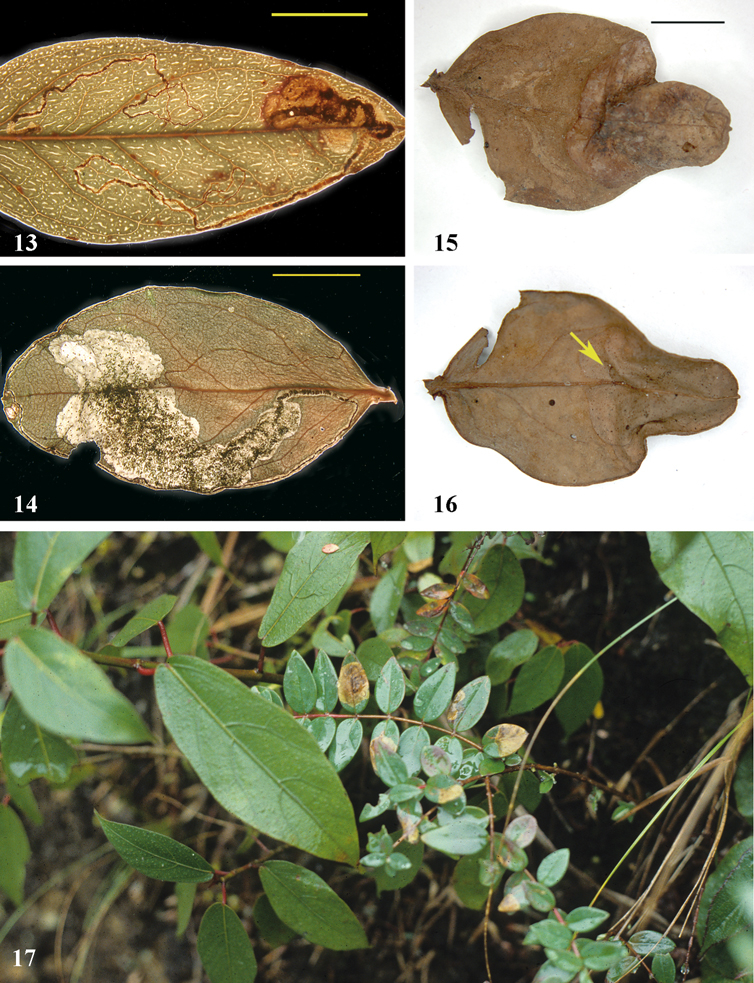
