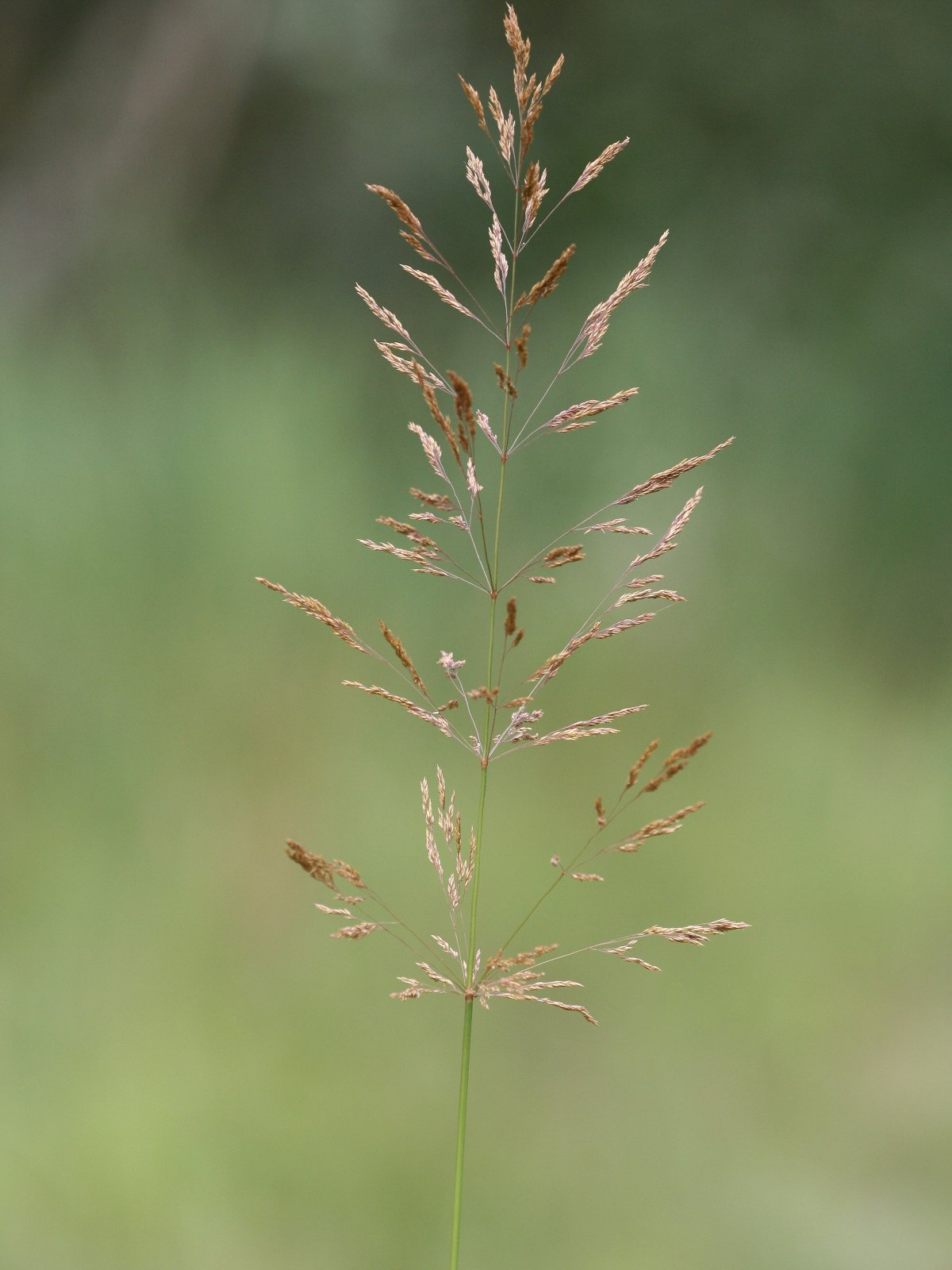

Scientific classification
- Kingdom: Plantae
- Clade: Tracheophytes
- Clade: Angiosperms
- Clade: Monocots
- Clade: Commelinids
- Order: Poales
- Family: Poaceae
- Subfamily: Pooideae
- Genus: Agrostis
- Species: A. gigantea

Binomial name
- Agrostis gigantea Roth, 1788

Synonyms
- Agrostis alba

= Agrostis gigantea =

Redtops

Species of grass

Agrostis gigantea is a perennial flowering plant in the grass family Poaceae, known by the common names black bent and redtop.

It is native to Europe, but in the cooler areas of North America was widely used as a pasture grass until the 1940s. Although it has largely been replaced by soybeans and more palatable grasses, it still gets some use in poor soils. It was one of the grasses planted in areas disturbed by the Trans-Alaska Pipeline. It generally does well in response to fires, with the survival of rhizomes and seeds.

It can be found in open woodland, rough grassland, hedgerows, roadsides and waste ground, and as a weed on arable land.

This species is similar to Agrostis stolonifera, with the key difference being that the latter has stolons. In fact the two are sometimes treated as a single species, and it is not always clear precisely what an author means by Agrostis alba or Agrostis stolonifera.

Many internet sources describe Agrostis capillaris as being the tallest of the bent species. However C E Hubbard describes its height as being 10–70 centimetres (3.9–27.6 in), whereas Agrostis gigantea's height is 40–120 centimetres (16–47 in). Marjorie Blamey, Richard and Alastair Fitter also describe black bent as being taller.

== Description ==
The leaves are dull green. The ligule is blunt, but toothed and up to 6 millimetres (0.24 in) long.

The panicle is open and loose, of green or purplish colour. It flowers from June to August.

The leaves are rolled in shoot, not hairy, no auricles, but the plant has rhizomes.

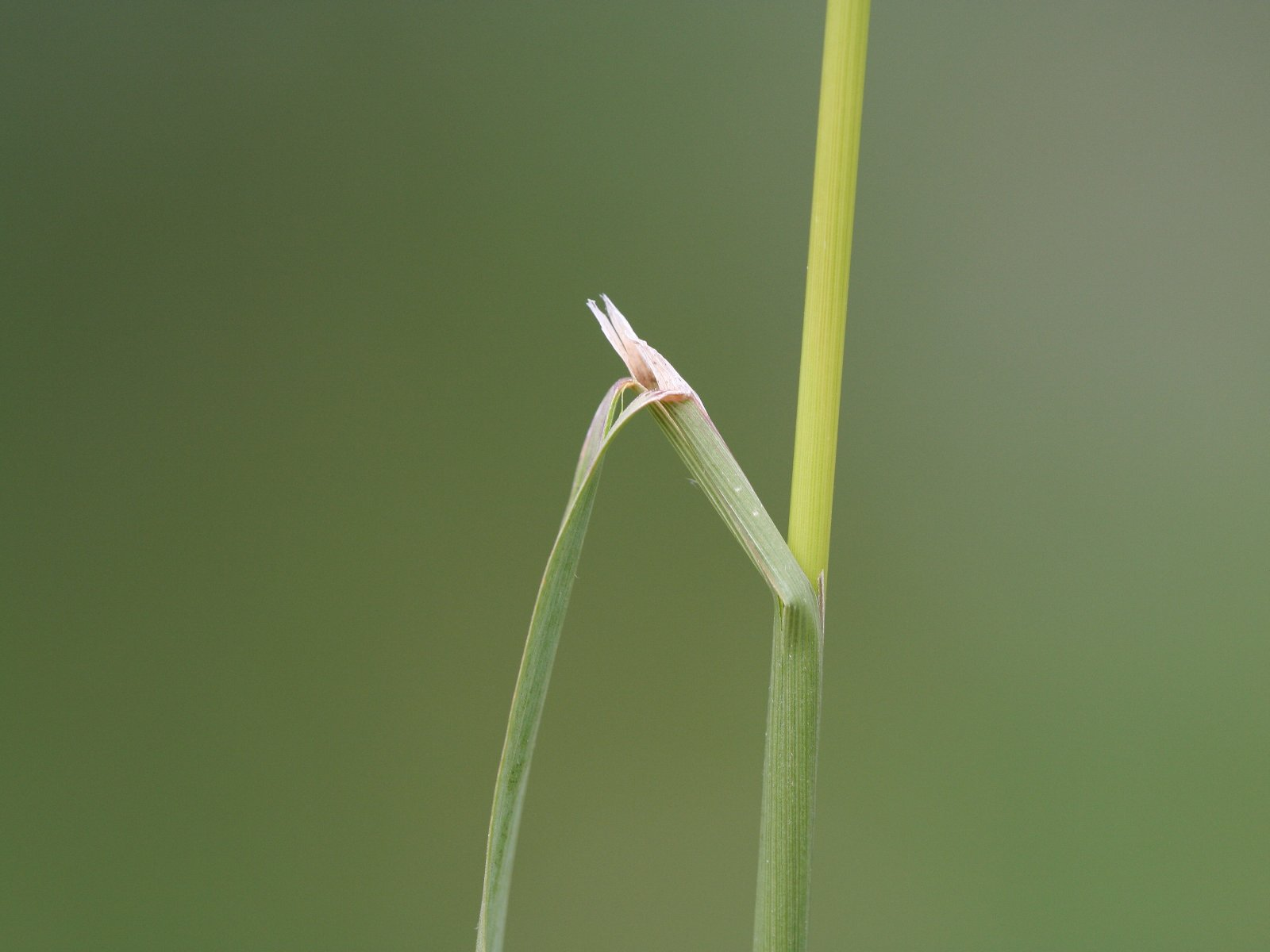
ligule up to 6mm long, no auricles, not hairy, rolled
