= David McClintock =

English botanist (1913–2001)

David McClintock MBE VMH FLS
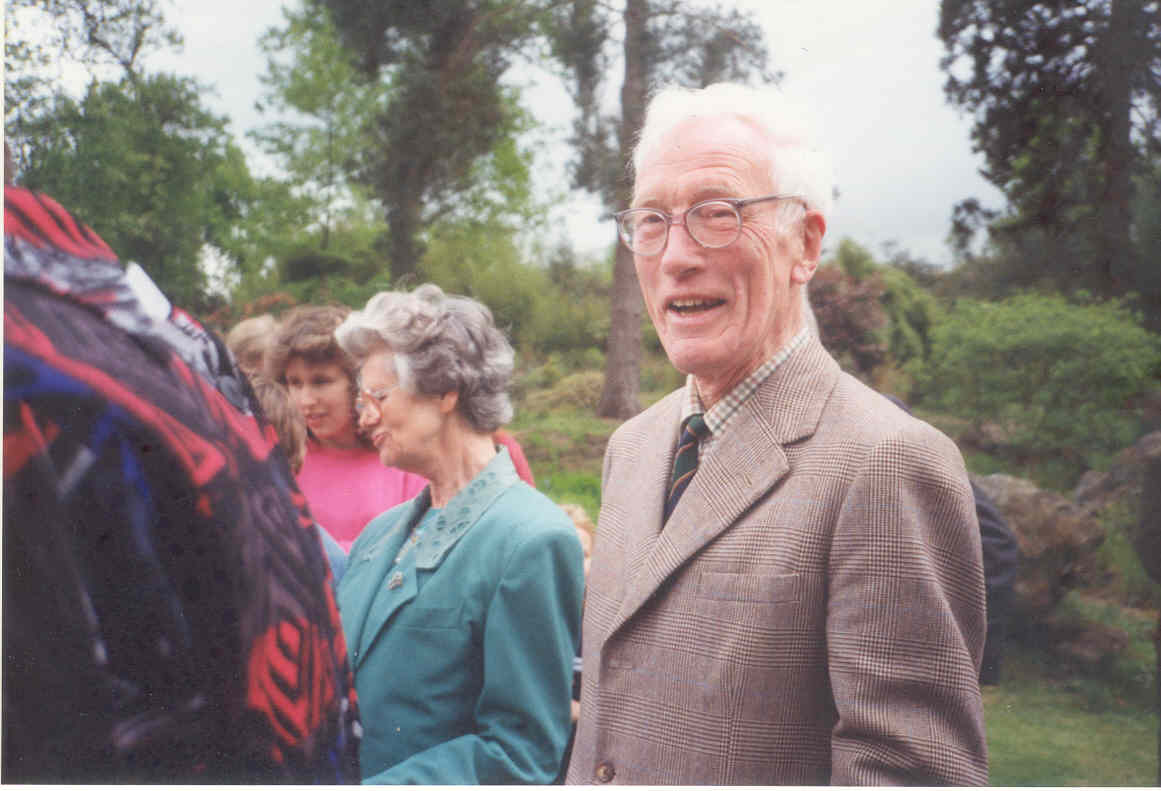
- McClintock in his garden with his wife Anne at a family party
- Born: David Charles McClintock; 4 July 1913; Newcastle-on-Tyne, England
- Died: 23 November 2001
- Education: West Downs Preparatory School; Harrow School
- Alma mater: Trinity College, Cambridge
- Spouse: Elizabeth Anne Dawson (m. 1940; died 1993)
- Children: 4

David Charles McClintock, MBE, VMH, FLS (1913–2001) was an English natural historian, botanist, horticulturist and author. McClintock was notably active in the worlds of natural history, horticulture and botany within the UK and Europe. He was the co-author of a popular flora, which sold a quarter of a million copies, and of many other books, papers and reviews. He recorded more than 3,000 species in the British Isles gathered from throughout the UK and seen a vast range of rarities – aliens being a particular focus. An amateur, McClintock also worked across the worlds of botany and horticulture, and organised a scientific survey of the natural history of Buckingham Palace Garden. He has been described as "one of the most distinguished and productive amateur botanists of his generation".

== Life ==
=== Early life ===
McClintock was born in 1913, in Newcastle-on-Tyne, the eldest of six children, with five younger sisters. His father, Edward Louis Longfield McClintock, then a curate, came from the Irish ascendancy (going back to the plantations of Ulster), and McClintock was to have a strong link to Ireland and Irish plants all his life. His mother, Margaret Katherine née Buxton, came from a long line of humanitarian evangelical Christians and Quakers, including Fowell Buxton and Elizabeth Fry.

McClintock was educated from age eight at West Downs Preparatory School in Winchester. From there he went to Harrow School and on to Cambridge, where at Trinity College he read German, French and Modern History.

Uncertain what career to follow, he took an uncle's advice and became a chartered accountant, being paid nothing for his first two years and a pittance for the third. There were surprising changes of direction in his life: in one vacation from Cambridge he had, in the absence of her governess, to teach his younger sister botany, and found that the names of the plants stuck in his mind – a bent much developed later and accelerating after the war. Newly qualified in 1937, he worked for The National News Letter, run by Stephen King-Hall, who was particularly concerned about the German threat; at the same time, with war looming, one of his cousins who lived in Hertfordshire persuaded him to join the Territorial Army, the Hertfordshire Yeomanry.

=== War and marriage ===
When war came in 1939, McClintock was mobilised at once (though King-Hall continued to pay him). After an inactive winter he joined, in early 1940, a battalion of the Scots Guards recruited (largely of officers who had to resign their commissions) to fight with the Finns against the Russians. So, at the taxpayers' expense, they went to the Alps to train in Chamonix; in the event, the Finns surrendered, and the regiment was disbanded. McClintock was then posted to 54th Division on the Northumberland coast, ready – supposedly – for a German invasion, but woefully short of equipment.

It was from there that he married, during the Battle of Britain, Elizabeth Anne Dawson, of Withyham, Sussex, the daughter of a widowed friend of his mother's (Olive Ramsay Dawson, née Davidson). Such were the exigencies of the time that the leave for his wedding was limited, officially, to 24 hours, though unofficially it was extended to 96 hours. His wife accompanied him briefly to the north, but then returned to live with her mother for the rest of the war. Later McClintock worked in intelligence in Matlock, and in London, as a preparation for governing a defeated land: training police and firemen to serve in an occupied Germany.

=== Germany ===
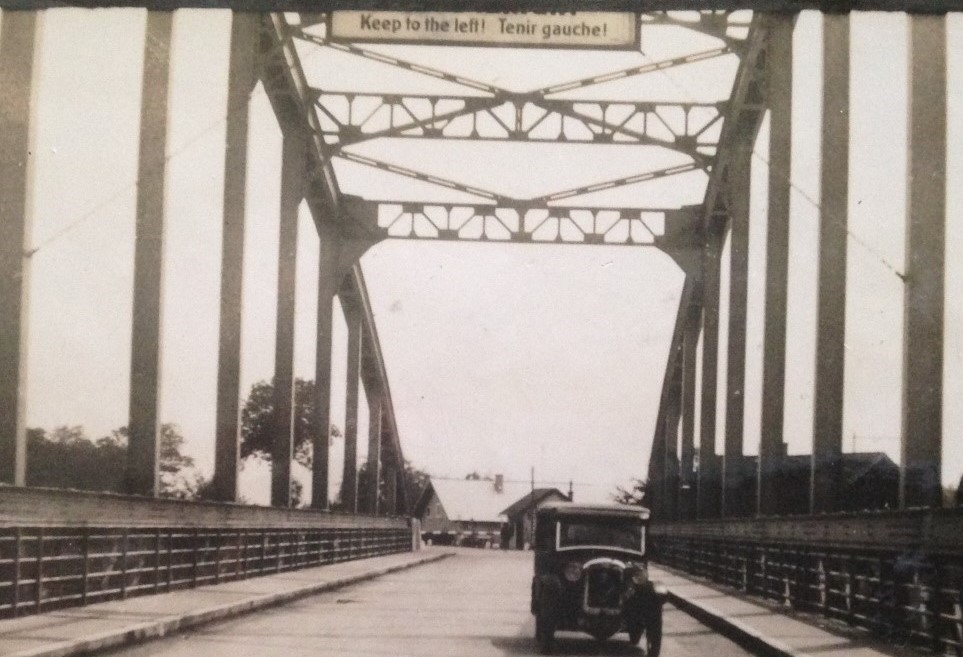
Crossing from right to left at Austria-Germany frontier

In June 1944 McClintock crossed to Normandy soon after D-day; following the German retreat across northern France and the Low Countries, he said that he was sometimes advancing 100 miles in a day, without ever meeting resistance that required him actually to use the skill he had acquired as a gunner. This visit to Germany followed a long association with that country; in 1931 he had stayed with cousins at their Schloss in Gröna near Magdeburg, to learn the language. He had made frequent visits in the 1930s, including one skiing trip in Bavaria when he, as a Briton, was able, unlike his German friends, to ski over the frontier into Austria; that was because Adolf Hitler, pre-Anschluss, had put a veto on travel there, to apply pressure to that end. It was also an era when Austria still drove on the left side of the road, and, on another occasion, McClintock photographed his Baby Austin 7 crossing from the right to the left at the frontier at Salzach.

The Germany of 1945 was very different: McClintock acquired a more glamorous car, a BMW coupe in which, he claimed, he had once driven 20 miles in 12 minutes. He ended up near Lübeck, in the territory which the British forces took, but which – by prior arrangement – the Russians were to hold. When, after the cessation of hostilities, that handover was imminent, the British removed truckloads of materials so that they could not be useful to the new occupying power. He said that he had never received an order to stop fighting, but did so when they realised the unfamiliar vehicles coming towards them were not German but Russian.

One non-combat moment in the war when he was in Hamburg. The rule for British servicemen was "Non-frat", a veto on conversations with Germans other than to give them an order. He discovered a local botanist and, with special permission, arranged a day's botanical outing with him on the Lüneburg Heath. Thither they went, had a profitable time and arranged a date for a repeat. When McClintock turned up at the house, he was greeted with great distress, because Herr Schwarz had shot himself – being so emotionally affected at the military defeat, the subjection, and then – by contrast – a few hours of treatment as a fellow human being.

=== Post-war life ===
Back in England, he settled in the village of Platt in Kent, with his wife Anne, and, at that point, two children, to whom were added two more later in the 1940s. Their house, Bracken Hill, had a three-acre woodland garden, to which McClintock could not then give much time, but which twenty years later he developed to make the most of its features – sandy soil and shade. He would show guests his colonies of heathers and bamboos: he held the National Council for the Conservation of Plants and Gardens (NCCPG) National Plant Collection of Sasa, which was transferred to Kew at his death.

McClintock worked briefly for a firm called Air Contractors, but resigned over a policy issue – that they would only carry cargo, not passengers. He was considered for secretary of the RHS, but there was a delay – in which time a friend offered him a job at the Coal Utilisation Council, where he remained until his retirement in 1973. He said at the end of his life that he had never applied for a job, and that offers had always come to him.·

== Natural history ==
Post-war, McClintock's spare time was given to botany and allied interests. Although he had no formal training in botany or in horticulture, nor indeed in any science, he became a self-taught specialist in many topics, including heathers and bamboo, and gained international recognition for his scholarship. He did much to foster the belief that botany and gardening were not separate disciplines: for example, he was influential in the late 1970s in setting up the RHS journal The Plantsman, and was a regular contributor to its pages.

In 1946 or 1947, at a Political and Economic Planning (PEP) lunch club he had met Richard Fitter; and this became a working partnership. They worked together on London's natural history, and McClintock offered to update the WFS (Wild Flower Society) list. They met Billy Collins, of the publishers of that name, who requested a new popular flora: this time-consuming enterprise led to the publication in 1956 of Collins' Pocket Guide to Wild Flowers. Eventually it had twelve reprints – a quarter of a million copies were sold – and it was translated into French. Its preface includes the words: "Of the degree of neglect this work has caused our families, the less said the better." Then, in 1966 his Companion to Flowers was published, by Bell.

=== Buckingham Palace and Guernsey ===
In the early 1960s a particular enterprise that took McClintock's time was a study of the natural history of Buckingham Palace Garden in London. He often spent an evening there, listing plants himself, or organising other specialists to survey their own field of expertise. Because the agreement to permit that study had specified minimal publicity, the eventual publication of those results, in 1964, was low profile; it was buried in the Proceedings and Transactions of the South London Entomological and Natural History Society, and unmentioned on the cover. It was later updated, and published more conspicuously, as a supplement to The London Naturalist in 1999 and 2001. Another particular enthusiasm was the island of Guernsey: McClintock wrote The Wildflowers of Guernsey (Collins, 1975).

=== Widening associations and reputation ===
McClintock's passion for heathers led him to become a figure in the Heather Society, finally acting as its President 1989–2000. He engineered strong links with professional and amateur growers, regularly broadcasting on the value of heathers as garden plants. He initiated and maintained the International Register of heather cultivars, as well as directly finding examples himself.

As well as being a field naturalist, McClintock aided the management of many organisations, among them the Linnean Society and the Royal Horticultural Society (RHS). As part of this, to aid bridging the gap between botanists and gardeners he organised a joint conference in 1971 between the RHS and the Botanical Society of the British Isles (BSBI).

After his retirement McClintock focused on planning and stocking his own garden, in theory such that it would require little labour in maintenance; this aim was never fulfilled, particularly as he aged and used regular paid help, though not gardeners who were professionally trained. The Bracken Hill garden featured on television in 1972, and in Alvilde Lees-Milne and Rosemary Verey's book The Englishman's Garden (Allen Lane, 1982, p. 100). Inside the house, McClintock's library contained 4,000 books, his herbarium had 3,500 sheets of bamboos, and his card index of heather cultivars numbered 3,000 in non-digitalised form.

=== Last years ===
Notable among the events of his later life were, in 1996, the award, from the RHS, of a VMH – the Victoria Medal for Horticulture – and a serious accident in 1998, aged 84. While botanising in Sicily (looking for Erica sicula), McClintock fell down a scree mountainside near Trapani, requiring transportation by helicopter to hospital in Palermo, where he had 40 stitches.

On 23 November 2001 he died at home, aged 88 and having never travelled outside Europe, and having never moved house after his demobilisation in 1945. His wife, Anne, had pre-deceased him, in 1993. He and his wife had four children.

== Honours ==
- 1968: La Société Guernesiaise: Membre d'honneur
- 1991: RHS Gold Veitch Memorial Medal for scientific and practical contribution to botany and horticulture
- 1993: Linnean Society: H H Bloomer Award for his contribution to natural history
- 1994: Made honorary member of the BSBI for his contribution and service to the society
- 1995: RHS Victoria Medal of Honour – its highest accolade in horticulture
- 2001: MBE 'for services to botany' (the award of which McClintock was informed shortly before he died)

== Society membership ==
McClintock was a systematic man, and kept this record of his offices and publications:

- 1952: Kent Ornithological Field Club (now Kent Ornithological Society) founder member
- 1955: Kent Field Club founder member
- 1958: Kent Trust for Nature Conservation (now Kent Wildlife Trust) founder member
- 1961–96: BSBI Recorder for the Channel Islands (excluding Jersey)
- 1963: Kent Trust for Nature Conservation Vice-president
- 1966: Garden History Society: founder member
- 1971–73: BSBI President
- 1972–74: Linnean Society Vice-president
- 1972: International registrar for heathers
- 1974–78: Linnean Society Editorial Secretary and Editor of Biological Journal of the Linnean Society
- 1976: Kent Field Club President
- 1976–95: BSBI referee for garden plants and bamboos
- 1978–82: Wild Flower Society Treasurer
- 1980–83: Ray Society President
- 1980–84: National Trust council member
- 1981–92: RHS Scientific Committee 1984–92 Vice-chairman (66 times in the chair)
- 1981–93: Wild Flower Society chairman
- 1982–87: RHS Publications Committee
- 1983–2001: BSBI referee for Erica, to which was added Calluna and Daboecia in 1995
- 1985: Bamboo Society founder member
- 1989: Heather Society President
- 1989–2001: Holder of National Council for the Conservation of Plants and Gardens (NCCPG) collection of Sasa, & allied genera of bamboo
- 1990–2000: International Dendrological Society Vice-president
- 1997–2000: Wild Flower Society President
- 2001: London Natural History Society President

== Achievements ==
- 2,750 book reviews
- 900 magazine articles, in 90 journals (including the various journals of the BSBI, the Heather Society and the Wild Flower Society as well as intermittently in, amongst others, The Plantsman/New Plantsman, The Garden, Report and Transactions of the Société Guernesiaise, Bulletin of the Kent Field Club, Irish Naturalists’ Journal, Country Life, The Countryman, Year Book of the International Dendrology Society, Deutsche Baumschule, Botanical Journal of the Linnean Society, Glasra, Kew Bulletin, Bamboo Society Newsletter, Gardeners’ Chronicle, Taxon, Karaca Arboretum Magazine, Glasgow Naturalist, Moorea, Hortus, Zahradnictiv and De Levende Natuur)
- 25 books contributed to
- 100 genera written up
- 26 heather cultivars found, and named (incl Erica erigena ‘Irish Dusk’, Erica erigena ‘Irish Salmon’ and Erica ciliaris ‘David McClintock’, one of two heathers named after him)
- 100 TV and radio broadcasts
