= A Garden Flora: Trees and Flowers Grown in the Gardens at Nymans =

1918 gardening book by Muriel Messel

- Author: Muriel Messel
- Publication date: 1918

A Garden Flora: Trees and Flowers Grown in the Gardens at Nymans is a 1918 book by Muriel Messel about the garden at Nymans in West Sussex, England. Messel died in December 1917, prior to the book's publication.

== Publication ==
The book was written by Messel in remembrance of her father Leonard Messel, who experimented on plants and introduced rare species into his garden at Nymans in West Sussex, England. He used glasshouses to house many species that were susceptible to being damaged in the English climate while they were still young. After a while, he would plant them in open ground. The book was illustrated by Alfred Parsons, and the foreword was written by William Robinson. It documents the plants that were grown at Nymans. Messel added notes about the plants that were considered to be more noteworthy. Its appendix lists plants that were destroyed during a winter that occurred from 1916 to 1917, but the list of destroyed plants is small. The book was published in 1918, shortly after Messel's death from influenza in December 1917.

== Reception ==
Country Life said of the publication, "It is a rare pleasure to handle a book whose well printed pages are of a strong, pure linen-rag paper; the hands pass among the leaves with an actual physical enjoyment; the eye also dwells with pleasure on the white buckram back and blue-grey paper sides of this thoroughly well done volume." Nature said that the book "is not only a splendid tribute... but also a most valuable work for all true garden lovers." The Saturday Review of Politics, Literature, Science and Art wrote, "The book will be of great interest to all expert lovers of rare and beautiful plants." A review in the Royal Botanic Gardens, Kew's Bulletin of Miscellaneous Information said, "Had Miss Messel lived to see the publication of her work, she could have been congratulated."
