= The Plant Review =

Quarterly horticultural magazine

Front cover of The Plant Review from March 2020. The cover photograph is of Galanthus 'Spindlestone Surprise' taken by Simon Garbutt

The Plant Review, published quarterly by the Royal Horticultural Society, is a 68-page magazine containing "fascinating in-depth articles for everyone who loves plants". Its authoritative articles are written by acknowledged experts on plant-related subjects, and include plant profiles, horticulture, botany and the development of garden plants, focusing on ornamental plants grown in temperate gardens. It also reflects the scientific work of the RHS, as well as research conducted by other horticultural and botanical institutions and individuals. First published in 1979 as The Plantsman, it was renamed The Plant Review from September 2019.

The RHS website describes The Plant Review as "Written by people who know and grow plants, each 68-page, colour issue balances an exciting mix of news, gardens and profiles of plants you will long to grow".

== Subject matter ==
Its subject matter includes:

- Profiles and evaluations of plant genera, species and cultivars of horticultural merit
- Recent plant introductions and descriptions of new plants
- New or advanced cultivation and propagation techniques
- Detailed accounts and findings from RHS trials
- Developments in plant taxonomy and changes to names of garden plants
- Plant exploration and travel
- Opinions and viewpoints of prominent horticultural figures
- Conservation of garden plants and wild plants of horticultural interest
- Advances in plant breeding and development of new garden plants
- Profiles of plant experts, breeders and horticultural personalities
- Botanical illustration and its development

== History of the magazine ==
=== The Plantsman ===
The Plantsman magazine was first published in June 1979. The quarterly began as a scholarly spin-off from The Garden, the monthly journal of the RHS, which was then widening its editorial scope and popularizing its approach, in response to the wider audience provided by the society's rapidly increasing membership. Between its inception in 1979 and its full take-over by the RHS in 1994 The Plantsman was published by New Perspectives Publishing Ltd (later Home and Law Publishing Ltd, then HHL Publishing Ltd), in association with the RHS.

In his introduction to the first edition of The Plantsman, its editorial director, Hugh Johnson, noted that the changing editorial policy of The Garden had meant:

"…leaving out, or at any rate abbreviating, the sort of scholarly, unhurried, lovingly minute studies of plants which are the true meat of specialist horticultural literature."

He described The Plantsman as the solution to this editorial quandary, and continued:

"Its intention is to supplement the monthly Journal with quarterly studies for the gardener whose passion for plants will never be satisfied—the plantsman of the title."

The first editor of The Plantsman was Elspeth Napier. Among the contributors to the first issue were Christopher Brickell (then Director of RHS Garden, Wisley, later Director General of the RHS), Roy Elliott (then Editor of the quarterly Bulletin of the Alpine Garden Society), Lawrence D Hills, founder (and then Director) of the Henry Doubleday Research Association, and David McClintock, botanist and writer of the best-selling Collins Pocket Guide to Wild Flowers.

The magazine was printed in black and white, with one colour plate as a frontispiece (as well as many finely detailed line illustrations) until February 1994.

=== The New Plantsman ===
In June 1994 The Plantsman was relaunched as The New Plantsman with a new editor, Victoria Matthews, previously Editor of The Kew Magazine (journal of the Royal Botanic Gardens, Kew). She was followed in the post, from March 1995, by Sabina Knees. From now onward the journal featured full-colour photographs and illustrations on alternate spreads.

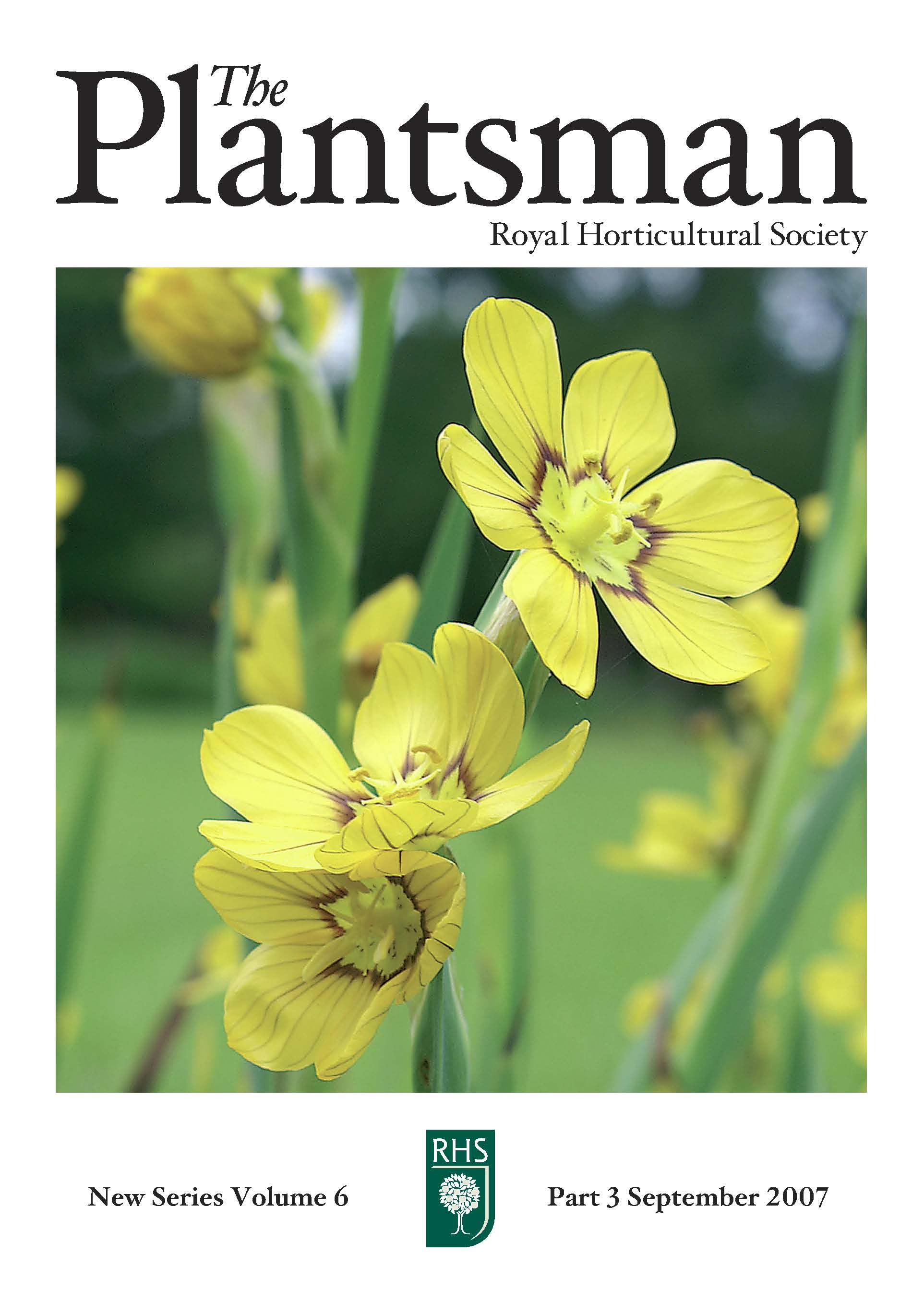
Front cover of The Plantsman n.s. from September 2007. The cover photograph is of Sisyrinchium macrocarpum taken by Rita Heaton

=== The Plantsman New Series ===
In March 2002 the publication reverted to its original title (with a New Series suffix) during the editorship of botanist and author Christopher Grey-Wilson. For the first time, full colour became available on every page. In 2005 the magazine received a refreshed design under its new editor, Mike Grant, previously a botanist at RHS Garden, Wisley. The publication continued to broaden its scope.

In November 2006 The Plantsman was named winner of the British Garden Media Guild award for 'Consumer Magazine of the Year'; the other two finalists being BBC Gardeners' World magazine and BBC Gardens Illustrated. In the judges' opinion:

All three shortlisted magazines were exceptional, well-rounded products with their target audience firmly in mind. The outcome was a very close-run contest, with The Plantsman just nudging ahead as the most complete package. Its faultless production, clean layouts, great writing and commissioning and a generally light touch on what might appear a rather scholarly content make it deserving of a much wider audience.

In November 2008 the same organisation awarded The Plantsman News Story of the Year for an item entitled 'Greece wants her plants back' in the March 2008 issue.

In 2018 Mike Grant retired as editor, becoming Contributing Editor, and James Armitage, formerly Principal Botanist at RHS Garden, Wisley took on the editorship. He experimented with the content and the look of the magazine, introducing new regular features, including specially commissioned botanical illustrations as frontispieces.

=== The Plantsman becomes The Plant Review ===
In the June 2019 issue it was announced that the title would cease to be known as The Plantsman. From the September 2019 issue it was rebranded, with a completely new design, as The Plant Review, a name more in line with its sister publication The Orchid Review.

== Editors ==
- Elspeth Napier (1979–1994)
- Victoria Matthews (1994)
- Sabina Knees (1995–2000)
- Christopher Grey-Wilson (2001–2005)
- Mike Grant (2005–2018)
- James Armitage (2018–present)

== See also ==
- List of horticultural magazines
