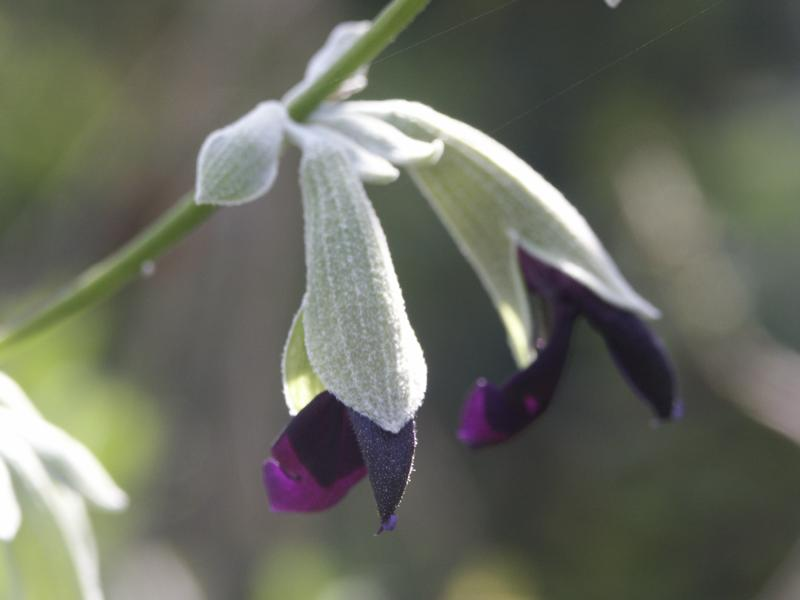

Scientific classification
- Kingdom: Plantae
- Clade: Tracheophytes
- Clade: Angiosperms
- Clade: Eudicots
- Clade: Asterids
- Order: Lamiales
- Family: Lamiaceae
- Genus: Salvia
- Species: S. discolor

Binomial name
- Salvia discolor Kunth

= Salvia discolor =

Species of plant

Salvia discolor (Andean sage) is a herbaceous perennial flowering plant, growing in a very localized area in Peru. It is equally rare in horticulture and in its native habitat. William Robinson wrote of its charms in 1933.

The plant is scandent, meaning that it climbs without the use of tendrils, with wiry white stems growing from its base. Mistletoe-green leaves of various sizes grow in pairs about 1–2 in apart on the stem, with the undersides covered in white hairs. The leaves, stem and flower buds all exhibit a strong and distinct odour of blackcurrant. The 1 in long deeply saturated dark purple flowers are held in a pistachio-green calyx, growing on 1 ft or longer inflorescences. The stems of the inflorescences are shiny and covered with glands, which frequently have insects stuck to them. It blooms during hot spells through summer and autumn and is a frequently grown ornamental on the French and Italian Rivieras, where it grows 3 ft high and wide.
