= Garden Making =

Canadian gardening magazine

- Editor-in-Chief: Beckie Fox
- Frequency: Quarterly
- Publisher: Michael Fox
- Founded: 2010
- Company: Inspiring Media Inc.
- Country: Canada
- Based in: Niagara-on-the-Lake, Ont.
- Language: English
- Website: gardenmaking.com

Garden Making is an independent Canadian quarterly magazine for home gardeners published by Inspiring Media Inc., in Niagara-on-the-Lake, Ontario.

== History ==
The magazine was launched in 2010 by Beckie and Michael Fox, two longtime magazine professionals. Beckie, Garden Making's editor-in-chief, was on the editorial team of Canadian Gardening magazine for its first decade, from the launch in 1990 until becoming its editor, from 1999 to 2001, when it was owned by Avid Media.

Michael, CEO and publisher of Garden Making, retired from Rogers Media in 2012, where he had worked in senior management for more than 30 years. He is the 2015 recipient of Outstanding Achievement from the National Magazine Awards Foundation.

== Reception ==
In 2016 Toronto Star columnist Sonia Day wrote that Garden Making "offers real, practical information about growing things (instead of lifestyle piffle) with lovely pictures and an easy-to-read layout."

In 2012 Garden Making was included as a recent example in an exhibition of British and Canadian gardening literature throughout the centuries at the Thomas Fisher Rare Book Library, University of Toronto.

== Awards ==
Gold Award for Best Overall Magazine, Fall 2016, Gold Award for Best Overall Magazine, Fall 2013, Association for Garden Communicators (GWA) Awards.

== See also ==
- Garden Culture
