= Agrostis alba =

Agrostis alba may refer to:

- Agrostis gigantea, a grass species
- Poa nemoralis, a grass species
