= Alfred Parsons (artist) =

English painter

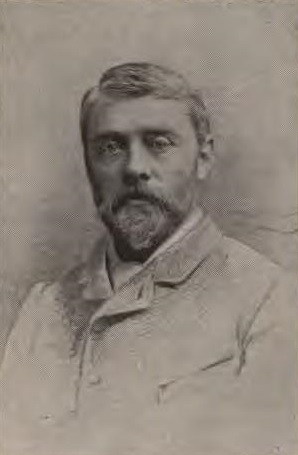
- Born: Alfred William Parsons; 2 December 1847
- Died: 16 January 1920 (aged 72)
- Known for: landscape, watercolour, illustration

Signature
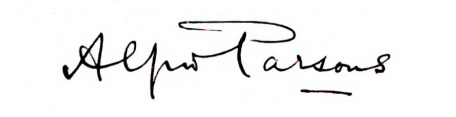

Alfred William Parsons RA PRWS (2 December 1847 – 16 January 1920) was an English artist: illustrator, landscape painter and garden designer, working in oils and watercolour.

Alfred Parsons was well known for his English landscape paintings and fine botanical illustrations which brought him into contact with William Robinson, for whom he provided illustrations. He regularly exhibited his art work from 1868 to 1919. He also artistically designed significant gardens mostly in England and some in Scotland and the United States. Parsons and his contemporaries believed that an artist could design better gardens. He won the Chantrey Bequest in 1887 and published his illustrated book Notes From Japan in 1896. Among many other works, he illustrated William Robinson's The Wild Garden (1883) and Ellen Willmott's The Genus Rosa. He was a keen gardener and for the last six years of his life took care of his roses at Luggershill, Broadway, Worcestershire, England.

Having exhibited every year from 1874, he was elected Associate Member of the Royal Academy (ARA) in 1897 and Royal Academician (RA) in 1911. These were mostly unpopulated landscape oils, which are now in many British museums. From 1882 to 1898 he belonged to, and exhibited at, the Royal Institute of Painters in Water Colours, before switching in 1899 to the rival Society of Painters in Watercolours in 1899 as ARWS, becoming full RWS in 1905, and finally president (PWRS) in 1913. Many of his watercolours reflect the fashion from the end of the 19th century for paintings of gardens, often concentrating on brightly coloured borders. Along with Walter Tyndale, he was slightly earlier in developing this genre than George Samuel Elgood or Ernest Arthur Rowe, who are perhaps the watercolourists most associated with it.

== Life and works ==
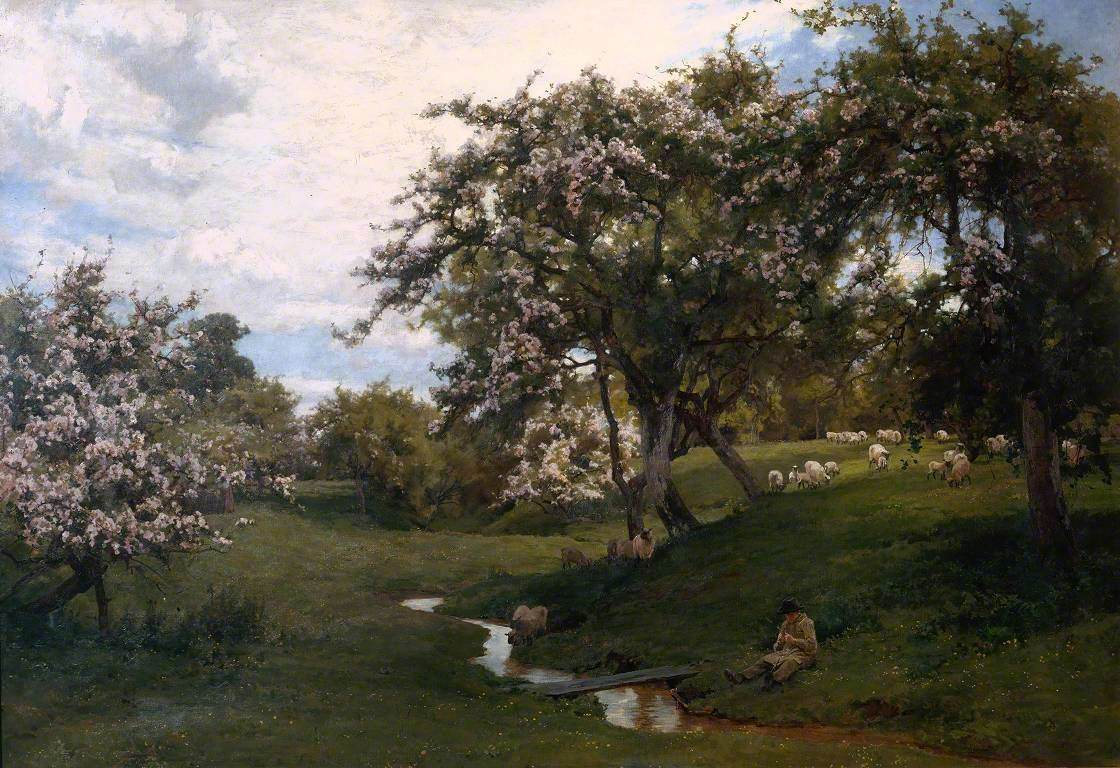
When Nature painted all things gay, 1887 (Tate Gallery)

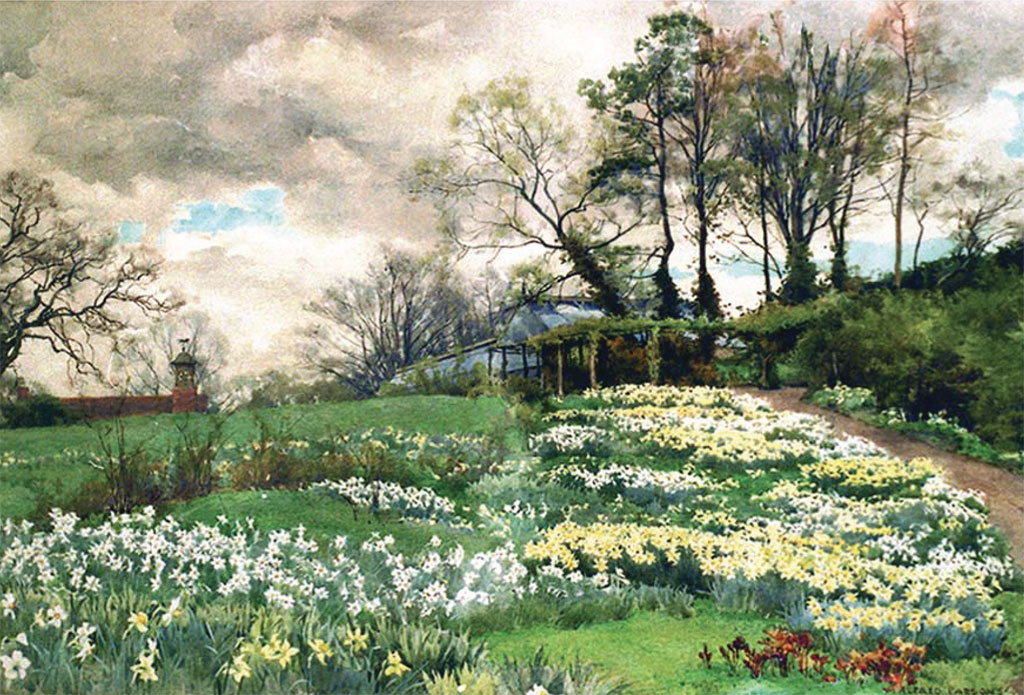
Watercolour of Ellen Willmott's garden (private collection)

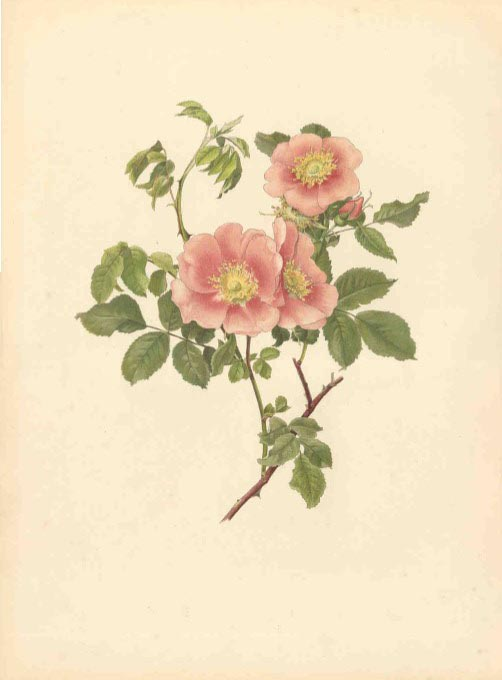
Rosa laxa

Alfred Parsons was born in Beckington near Frome, Somerset, the son of Dr Joshua Parsons, a surgeon and dedicated gardener of alpines and correspondent of William Robinson, (whose work he later illustrated) and raised in London. After being educated privately, he started work as a clerk in the Post Office in 1867. After two years, he left the unsuitable desk-job to pursue studies at the Kensington School of Art, and went on to exhibit at various galleries including the Grosvenor Gallery and the Royal Academy, where he exhibited every year from 1874 to the end of his life.

Parsons, whose interest in "Englishness" paralleled the tastes of upper-class American émigrés, joined the notable artistic community in the village of Broadway in the Cotswolds (Worcestershire). His associates included the American artists Francis Davis Millet, who remained Parson's closest friend until he drowned aboard the Titanic, and Edwin Austin Abbey, with whom he collaborated in illustrated books. Through American contacts made while at the artists' colony he became an illustrator for Harper's Magazine, and also provided illustrations for books – including short stories by Thomas Hardy and travel books (see below). Henry James noted that Parson's images of English country life mirrored the aspirations of Americans:

Was it there that Mr. Parsons learned so well how Americans would like England to appear? ...The England of his pencil... is exactly the England that the American imagination, restricted to itself, constructs from the poets, the novelists, from all the delightful testimony it inherits".

The three men, Parsons, Millet and Abbey, lived together and entertained sociably at 54, Bedford Gardens, London. William Robinson asked him to provide illustrations for The Wild Garden: Or, Our Groves and Shrubberies Made Beautiful by the Naturalisation of Hardy Exotic Plants (1881, the 1903-5th edition being the best one) led to Robinson's invitation for Parsons to lend advice at his Gravetye Manor. Several artists engraved Parsons' illustrations. As it was the custom, he never engraved himself. Parsons' first garden commission, however, came through the architect Philip Webb, who was designing Clouds in Wiltshire for Mr and Mrs Percy Wyndham, prominent figures among the aesthetic-minded group called "The Souls": Parsons provided an unostentatious planting of spring bulbs, Magnolia × soulangeana, roses and lilies, in a framework of clipped yews, wedding new and old elements.

Parsons' long-lasting association with the Anglo-American group centred in Broadway, began in 1885, when Parsons and his London friends rented a house facing the Green, where John Singer Sargent began painting Carnation, Lily, Lily, Rose. Parsons first made a garden for himself and his friends at Russell House facing the Evesham road at the western entrance to Broadway, then a garden setting for Mary Anderson, Mrs Antonio de Navarro at Court Farm (1896 onwards) and later for himself, at Luggershill (1903 onwards).

Parsons' fine illustrated book, his only published text, Notes in Japan (London, 1895, reprinted) came from his visit to that country between 1892 and 1894. Although many of his paintings included bright colours, especially in flowering plants, he also painted many grisaille watercolours using a very restricted palette of blacks, greys, and browns.

Ellen Willmott's The Genus Rosa, published in two volumes between 1910 and 1914, includes 132 watercolours of roses painted by Parsons between 1890 and 1908, which are now held by the Lindley Library in London. Willmott also commissioned Parsons to paint her three gardens.

As a designer of gardens, Parsons went into partnership in 1898 with Captain Walter Croker St-Ives Partridge (1855–1924), as Parsons and Partridge of Newbury, Berkshire. In 1884 they took into the partnership Charles Clement Tudway (1846–1926). Parson's restorations of old gardens and designs of sympathetic settings for old houses can be appreciated at 15th-century Great Chalfield Manor and at Elizabethan Littlecote House, both in Wiltshire. Alfred Parsons and Walter Partridge also worked on the gardens at Welbeck Abbey, 1899—1905 and at Bryngarw, Glamorganshire. An early essay was Wightwick Manor, a reproduction black-and-white Tudor-style house, for which Parsons provided the garden in 1887 (now National Trust).

== Books illustrated ==
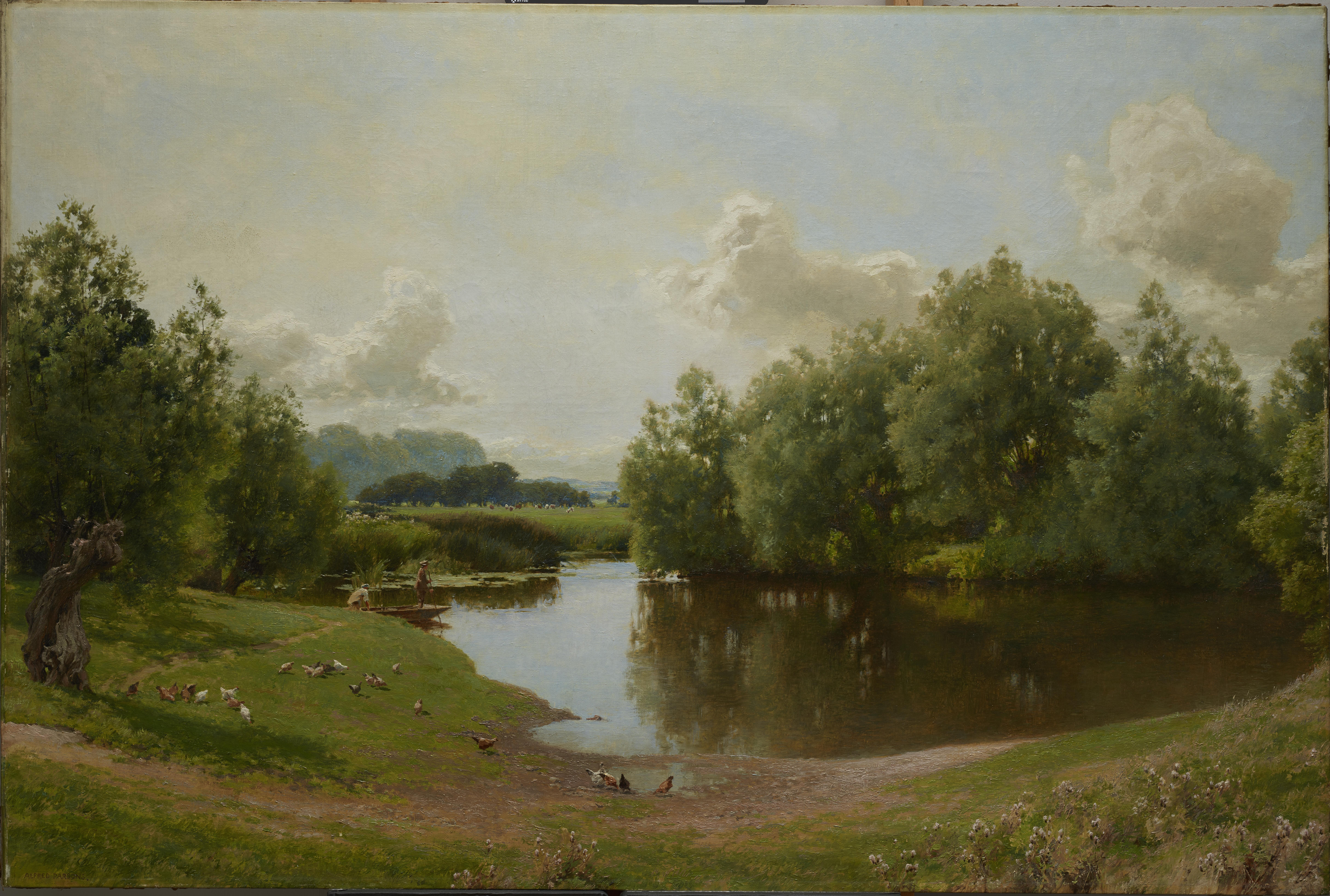
The Ouse at Bledsoe, Dallas Museum of Art

- Robinson, William. The Wild Garden (London: John Murray, 1883).
- Abbey, Edwin Austin. Old Songs, with drawings (Harper & Bros. 1889).
- Dobson, Austin. The quiet life : certain verses by various hands (New York : Harper & Brothers, 1890)
- Quiller-Couch, Arthur Thomas. The Warwickshire Avon (Harper & Bros. 1892).
- Parsons, Alfred. Notes in Japan (Harper & Bros. 1895).
- Wordsworth, William. A Selection from the Sonnets of William Wordsworth with numerous Illustrations by Alfred Parsons (Harper & Bros. 1890).
- Wordsworth, William. Wordsworth (Longmans, Green & Co. 1897)
