= The Garden (journal, 1871–1927) =

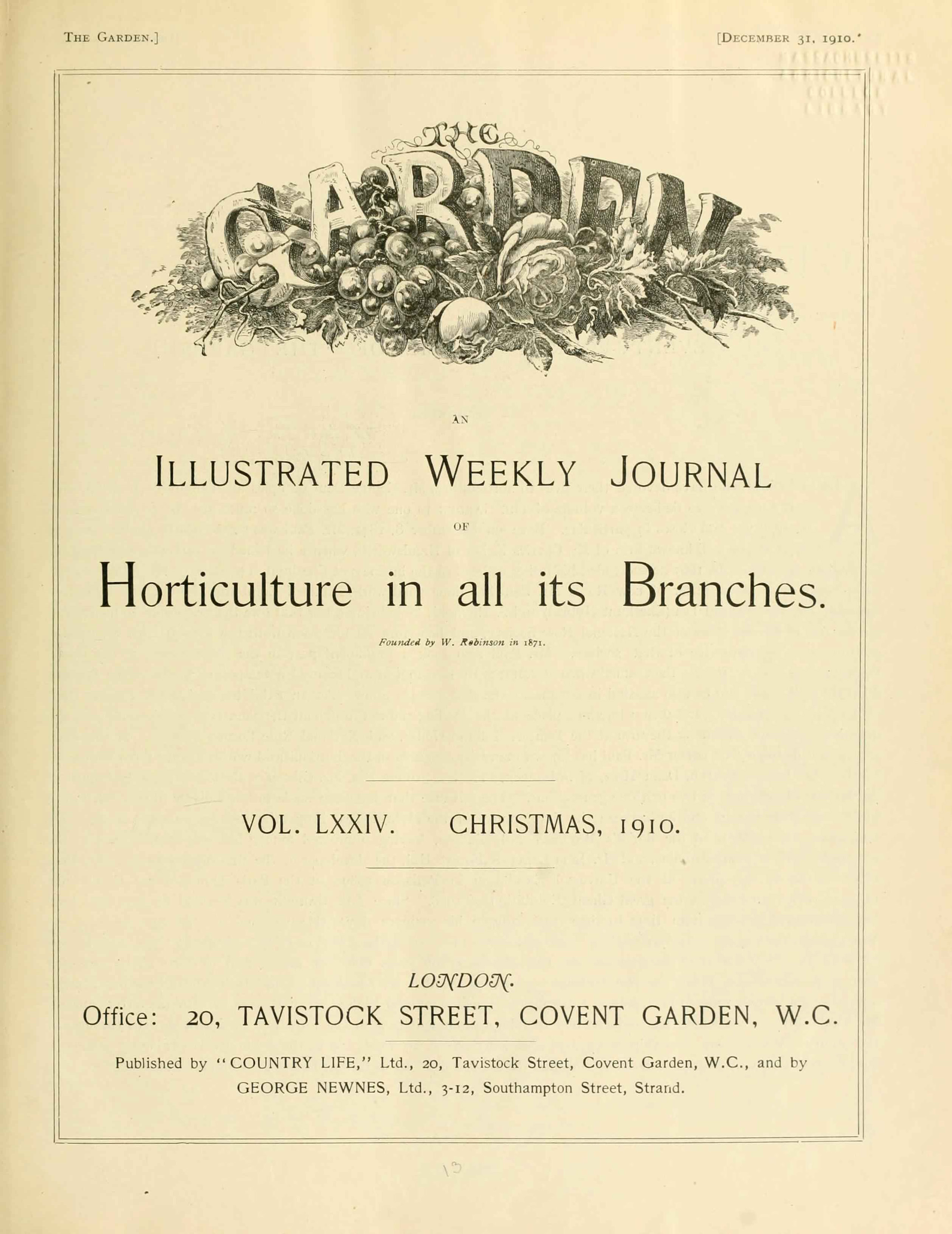
- The Garden, title page from December 1910
- Editor: William Robinson
- Categories: Gardening
- Frequency: Weekly
- First issue: 1871
- Country: United Kingdom
- Based in: London

The Garden was a British gardening magazine founded in 1871 by William Robinson. Its subtitle was An Illustrated Weekly Journal on Gardening in all its Branches. The first issue was dated 21 November 1871, although the 1871 issues are commonly bound into volumes assigned to 1872. Contributors included James Britten, Canon Ellacombe, Dean Hole, Oliver Wendell Holmes, Gertrude Jekyll, Frank Miles, William Morris and John Ruskin. In 1899 William Robinson appointed Gertrude Jekyll as editor of The Garden. It ceased publication in 1927.

Robinson also founded a second periodical in 1879 called Gardening, which later became Gardening Illustrated.

In 1975 the Royal Horticultural Society renamed its members' magazine, the Journal of the Royal Horticultural Society, as The Garden, partly to commemorate Robinson's discontinued periodical.

== See also ==
- List of horticultural magazines
