= John G. Williams (ornithologist) =

Welsh ornithologist (1913–1997)

John G. Williams (4 April 1913 – 28 December 1997) was a Welsh ornithologist. His collections date from 1954 to 1986, collecting mainly in East Africa and the eastern United States. The Western Foundation of Vertebrate Zoology in Camarillo, California, houses a lot of his aviary materials, in addition to 190 of Williams' egg collections.

Williams was born in Cardiff. His obituary from The Independent, written by Don Turner, states that Williams also worked at the National Museum of Wales as an ornithologist and taxidermist, and also at the Coryndon Museum in Nairobi, Kenya, as a curator of birds from 1944 to 1966.

== Selected publications ==
- Williams, John George with illustrations by Norman Arlott (1980) A field guide to the birds of East Africa, Collins
