= The Gardeners' Chronicle =

Periodical gardening publication

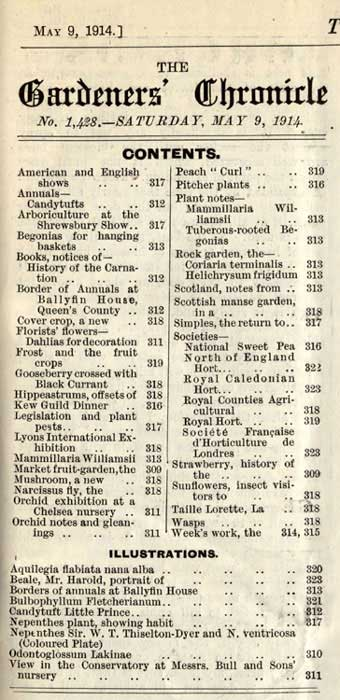
- The contents page from a 1914 edition of the Chronicle
- Categories: Horticulture magazine
- Founded: 1841
- Final issue: 1986
- Country: UK

The Gardeners' Chronicle was a British horticulture periodical. It lasted as a title in its own right for nearly 150 years and is still extant as part of the magazine Horticulture Week.

== History ==
Founded in 1841 by the horticulturists Joseph Paxton, Charles Wentworth Dilke, John Lindley and the printer William Bradbury it originally took the form of a traditional newspaper, with both national and foreign news, but also with vast amounts of material sent in by gardeners and scientists, covering every conceivable aspect of gardening.

Its first editor, John Lindley, was one of the founders. Another founder, Paxton, later also became editor. Prominent contributors included Charles Darwin and Joseph Hooker.

By 1851, the circulation of The Gardeners' Chronicle was given as 6500. Compared with that of the more eminent Observer at 6230, and The Economist at 3826, The Gardeners' Chronicle did well. These figures may include the Chronicle's international readership.

It was noted for its large advertising section and when the glass tax was abolished in 1845 and the huge interest generated by the Great Exhibition made personal, small-scale greenhouses possible, it became full of adverts for these, many designed by Paxton himself, and from the sales of which he generated a tidy income.

== Successive titles ==
- 1841–1843: The Gardeners' Chronicle
- 1844–1873: The Gardeners' Chronicle and Agricultural Gazette
- 1874–1886: The Gardeners' Chronicle. New Series (vols. 1–26)
- 1887–1956: The Gardeners' Chronicle. Third Series (vols. 1–139)
- 1957–1963: Gardeners Chronicle & Gardening Illustrated (vols. 140–154)
- 1964–1968: Gardener's Chronicle: The Magazine of Advanced Gardening (vols. 155–164)
- 1969–1971: Gardeners' Chronicle & New Horticulturist (vols. 165–170)
- 1972–1977: Gardeners' Chronicle: The Horticultural Trade Journal (vols. 171–182)
- 1978–1985: Gardeners' Chronicle & Horticultural Trade Journal: The Horticulture & Amenity Weekly (vols. 183–197)
- 1985: Gardeners Chronicle & Horticultural Trade Journal: The Horticulture Week (vol. 198)
- 1986 onwards: Horticulture Week (vols. 199–221; no longer numbered since 1997) ISSN 0269-9478

From January 1874, The Agricultural Gazette (New Series) became an independent publication. The Agricultural Gazette was edited from its inception in 1844 until his death in 1888 by John Chalmers Morton.

== See also ==
- List of horticultural magazines
