= The Pocket Guide to British Birds =

1952 book by R. S. R. Fitter and R. A. Richardson

- First edition
- Author: R. S. R. Fitter
- Illustrator: Richard A. Richardson
- Publisher: Collins
- Publication date: 1952
- Pages: 240 (1st ed.); 287 (2nd rev. ed.)
- OCLC: 5672374

The Pocket Guide to British Birds is a guide written by British naturalist and expert on wild flowers Richard Sidney Richmond Fitter, and illustrated by Richard Richardson, which was first published by Collins in 1952. Reprinted in 1953 and 1954, a second more revised 287-page edition was published by Collins in 1966, and in 1968.

This guidebook is organized differently from most, by habitat (land or water) and size, instead of by genus and species as in the Roger Tory Peterson and other guides. It also provides Fitter's unique "key" system for identifying unfamiliar birds, first by plumage (colour), then "structural features" (shape), behavior and finally habitat (cf. the order of the species described.)

Despite Fitter's helpful advice how to identify a bird, the unfamiliar organization of his book limited its initial appeal; but this was more than compensated by the number and quality of Richardson's drawings, of which bird artist Peter Scott wrote in his foreword: "nothing of the kind has been so well done in Britain before ... a new bird painter of great skill."
