= Greenhouse Canada =

National business magazine published out of Simcoe, Ontario

- Frequency: Monthly
- Founded: 1980
- Country: Canada
- Based in: Simcoe, Ontario
- Website: Greenhouse Canada

Greenhouse Canada is the only national business magazine published exclusively for the commercial greenhouse grower in Canada. It is a monthly magazine based in Simcoe, Ontario.

== History and profile ==
The magazine was established in 1980 and the publisher was the Growth Publications. The first issue was just 1,600 copies. It is published monthly. Its headquarters is in Simcoe, Ontario.

== See also ==
- List of horticultural magazines
