= Marjorie Blamey =

British botanical illustrator (1918–2019)

- Born: Marjorie Netta Day; 13 March 1918; Talawakelle, Sri Lanka
- Died: 8 September 2019 (aged 101); St Germans, Cornwall, England
- Education: at home; RADA
- Known for: botanical paintings
- Spouse: Philip Blamey (m. 1941, his death 2014)
- Children: 4
- Awards: MBE

Marjorie Netta Blamey MBE (13 March 1918 – 8 September 2019) was an English painter and illustrator, particularly noted for her botanical illustrations for which she was described as "the finest living botanical illustrator", "the best contemporary botanical illustrator" and "the top illustrator in Europe" in reviews around the world.

== Life and work ==
Born in Talawakelle, Sri Lanka, Marjorie Blamey was the daughter of Arthur Day, a doctor, and Janette Newton-Baker, a nurse. She spent her early years from 1921 in the UK, on the Isle of Wight and Epsom, Surrey, where she was encouraged to paint and draw. Ability at acting led her to win a scholarship to RADA in 1934 and parts in several films. She was also a successful photographer and exhibited at the London Salon of Photography. During the Second World War she trained and then worked as a nurse and drove ambulances. She met her future husband who was a junior officer in the Staffordshire regiment. They married in 1941 and subsequently had 4 children. After the war, she and her husband successfully ran a small dairy farm near Liskeard for 20 years.

An editor from a London publishing house spotted her work at a display of amateur art in Cornwall and her career as a full-time book illustrator was born. She thus took up illustrating professionally at the age of 48. Her first commission was for a book on magnolias by the Cornish horticulturist Neil Treseder. Another early book, and Marjorie Blamey's first major success, was Wildflowers Of Britain And Ireland, published by Collins in their famous Pocket Guide series. Translated into all European languages, it has sold more than a million copies and was still in print in 2020. She illustrated this book and the text was written by Richard Fitter, probably the most successful author of natural history field guides ever. Fitter's son Alastair contributed the distribution maps. Blamey stated "It was a privilege to work with Richard. He was such a vivid writer." She soon became regarded as one of the leading botanical illustrators in the world.

Over the years, the Blameys' built up an archive of more than 10,000 paintings of flowers from the Arctic Circle to the Mediterranean, which were used in publications worldwide. They travelled extensively so she could paint specimens and flowers were also sent to her. These illustrations were all carefully kept in files as well as on the computers of the Blameys and their editor in France. It was part of her husband Philip's role to look after the archive. These paintings, and their related notes and pressed flowers, are now permanently loaned to the University of Plymouth, UK. Other painting are in public and private collections.

She was awarded three gold medals by the Royal Horticultural Society and two from the Alpine Garden Society. Blamey's books have received accolades. Cassell's Wild Flowers Of Britain And Northern Europe was selected as Book of the Year by the journal Natural World in 1989. Wild Flowers Of Britain And Ireland was the Book of the Year choice of the Botanical Society of the British Isles in 2003. Another book, Wild Flowers By Colour, was the Editor's Choice of BBC Wildlife Magazine in 2005. She was also a founder member of the charity Plantlife International which concentrates on the conservation of plants. Her books have been translated into at least 10 languages.

In 2007, Marjorie Blamey was presented with an MBE at a special ceremony in Fowey. She felt that a trip to Buckingham Palace would be too tiring and was presented with her award for services to illustration by Lady Mary Holborow, the Lord Lieutenant of Cornwall, at the Fowey Hotel. Blamey's daughter, Anne Irons, said of the occasion: "We had a brilliant time, it was just wonderful. The whole family is so proud of her. A group of 20 family members, including grandchildren, children and my aunt and uncle, met at the hotel to see Lady Mary hand my mother the award, and read a citation. We then enjoyed a wonderful buffet lunch."

Until his death in 2014, Blamey lived with her husband Philip at their home in the Cornish village of St Germans. She remained there until her own death at the age of 101, in September 2019.

== Selected publications ==
Books where Blamey contributed the illustrations and sometimes text include:

- Cottage gardens (1969) Roy Genders
- Scented Wild Flowers of Britain (1971) Roy Genders
- Food for Free (1972) Richard Mabey
- Wild Flowers of Britain and Northern Europe (1974) Marjorie Blamey, Richard Fitter and Alistair Fitter
- Magnolias (1978) Neil G. Treseder
- Alpine Flowers of Britain and Europe (1979) Chris Grey-Wilson and Margaret Blamey
- Marjorie Blamey's Flowers of the Countryside (1980) Marjorie Blamey
- Bulbs. The Bulbous Plants of Europe and their allies. (1981) Chris Grey-Wilson and Brian Mathew
- Fruits, Nuts and Berries (1984) Philip Blamey and Marjorie Blamey
- The Illustrated Flora of Britain and Northern Europe (1989) Marjorie Blamey and Chris Grey-Wilson
- Mediterranean Wild Flowers (1993) Marjorie Blamey and Chris Grey-Wilson
- Marjorie Blamey's Wild Flowers by Colour (1997) Marjorie Blamey
- Wild Flowers of Britain and Ireland (2003) Marjorie Blamey, Richard Fitter and Alistair Fitter
