= R. S. R. Fitter =

British naturalist & author (1913–2005)

Richard Sidney Richmond Fitter
- Born: 1 March 1913; Streatham, London, England
- Died: 3 September 2005 (aged 92)
- Education: Eastbourne College; London School of Economics
- Occupations: Naturalist; Author

Richard Sidney Richmond Fitter (1 March 1913 – 3 September 2005) was a British naturalist and author. He was an expert on wildflowers and authored several guides for amateur naturalists.

== Life ==
Fitter was born in London, England, on 1 March 1913 and was educated at Eastbourne College and the London School of Economics. He was the only son of Sidney and Dorothy Fitter.

In 1938 he married Alice Mary (Maisie) Stewart (died 1996) and they had two sons and a daughter.

He was recruited to the Institute for Political and Economic Planning in 1936, and in 1940 moved to the social research organisation Mass-Observation to investigate civilian morale for the Ministry of Information.

During the Second World War he worked at the Operations research section of the RAF Coastal Command. During this time he worked for two hours each evening on a comprehensive urban natural history of London, which was published in May 1945 as London's Natural History, his first book.

After the war in 1945 he was appointed secretary of the Wildlife Conservation Special Committee of the Ministry of Town and Country Planning, which made proposals for nature conservation as part of the reconstruction after the war.

In 1946, Fitter became assistant editor of The Countryman and moved from London to Burford, Oxfordshire. "With the publication of The Pocket Guide to British Birds (1952), illustrated by R.A. Richardson, Fitter became a bestselling author." In later life he moved to Great Shelford, Cambridge.

He died in Cambridge on 3 September 2005, survived by his children.

== Work ==
Fitter wrote many books and was active in various areas relating to nature and conservation. His wife Maisie was a colleague and collaborator on many of his researches. They were joint authors of The Penguin Dictionary of British Natural History (1967).

His son, Alastair Fitter, is a professor of biology at the University of York. They collaborated on three books: Guide to the Countryside (1984); Field Guide to the Freshwater Life of Britain and NW Europe (1986); and Wild Flowers of Britain and Ireland (2003). In 2002 father and son jointly authored a paper in Science analysing the changing phenology of plant flowering times due to global warming.

He wrote the Pocket Guide to British Birds (1952), which started a series of field guides by various authors, setting a style which was helpful to the inexperienced observer by the way it was organised and explained, placing short texts alongside pictures. This had birds grouped according to habitat, size and colour, rather than the biological classification which traditional books had done. His Pocket Guide to Wild Flowers (with David McClintock, 1956) had pictures grouped by colour for easier identification. His Fontana Wild Flower Guide (1957) showed which plants might be found in different counties.

He was heavily involved with nature conservation organisations including the Council for Nature, the International Union for Conservation of Nature and the Fauna and Flora Preservation Society (now Fauna and Flora International) where he was Honorary Secretary. He also served on the councils of the RSPB and the British Trust for Ornithology, and founded the Berkshire, Buckinghamshire and Oxfordshire Naturalists' Trust. In 1968 he was one of the founders of the British Deer Society, which aimed to help with study, management and control.

He was also involved in the search for the Loch Ness Monster, being a director of the Loch Ness Investigation Bureau.

== Honours ==
- Order of the Golden Ark in the Netherlands (1978)
- Peter Scott Medal from the British Naturalists' Association (1998)
- Christopher Cadbury Medal from the Royal Society for Nature Conservation.

In 2008 the British Naturalists' Association instituted a Richard Fitter Memorial Medal which is awarded annually to an individual who is a dedicated active field naturalist.

== Hobbies ==
Fitter collected 'bird inn signs.' He wrote about his hobby in the Birmingham Daily Post, published Tuesday 22 March 1955. Fitter wrote that "I just note them down in my diary whenever I see them. I started during the second winter of the war, as a kind of light relief from the somewhat grim preoccupations of those days." By 1955 Fitter had several hundred signs in his collection of some 38 different bird species. https://www.britishnewspaperarchive.co.uk/viewer/bl/0000619/19550322/326/0015

== Bibliography ==
- London's Natural History 1945 New Naturalist no 3.
- London's Birds (Collins) 1949
- Home Counties (About Britain Series; No.3) 1951
- Contributions to the Bibliography of the Natural History of the London Area: No.2: a Subject Index of the Society's Journals, 1941–51 1952
- The Pocket Guide to British Birds (illustrated by Richard Richardson) 1952
- Birds of Town and Village (Collins Naturalist Series) 1953
- The Natural History of the City 1953
- The Pocket Guide to Nests and Eggs 1955
- Fontana Bird Guide (Fontana series) 1956
- Pocket Guide to Wild Flowers (with David McClintock) 1956
- Fontana Wild Flower Guide 1957
- Your Book of Bird Watching 1958
- The Ark in Our Midst: The Story of the Introduced Animals af Britain; Birds, Beasts, Reptiles, Amphibians, Fishes 1959
- The 'Countryman' nature book: An anthology from 'The Countryman' 1960
- Your Book About Wild Flowers 1960
- Collins Guide to Bird Watching (illustrated by Richard Richardson) 1963
- Fitters Rural Rides: 'The Observer' Illustrated Map-Guide to the Countryside 1963
- Wildlife in Britain (Pelican books) 1963
- Wildlife – and Death (Take Home Books) 1964
- Britain's wildlife: Rarities and Introductions 1966 (illustrated by John Leigh-Pemberton)
- Pocket Guide to British Birds (with Richard Richardson) 1966
- The Penguin Dictionary of British Natural History (with Maisie Fitter) 1967
- Pocket Guide to Nests and Eggs 1968
- Vanishing Wild Animals of the World 1968
- Guide to Bird Watching 1970
- Contributed section on Mammals to "The Shell Natural History of Britain" 1970
- Finding Wild Flowers 1971
- Birds of Britain and Europe with North Africa and the Middle East (with illustrations by Hermann Heinzel and maps by John Parslow) 1972
- The Butterfly Ball and the Grasshopper's Feast (with William Plomer, illustrations by Alan Aldridge) 1973
- Wild Flowers of Britain and Northern Europe (Collins Pocket Guide) (with Alastair Fitter, Marjorie Blamey)1974
- Penitent Butchers: The Fauna Preservation Society 1903–1978 (with Sir Peter Scott) 1978
- Collins Gem Wild Flowers (with Marjorie Blamey) 1980
- The Complete Guide to British Wildlife (with Alastair Fitter, illustrated by Norman Arlott)
- Grasses, Sedges, Rushes & Ferns of Britain and Northern Europe (Collins Pocket Guide) (with Alastair Fitter, Ann Farrer) 1984
- Collins Guide to the Countryside (with Alastair Fitter) 1984
- Contributed the article on 'Naturalized Birds' to A Dictionary of Birds (edited by Bruce Campbell & Elizabeth Lack 1985
- Wild Life of the Thames Counties (Ed) 1985
- A Field Guide to Freshwater Life in Britain and North-west Europe (Collins Field Guide) (with Richard Manuel) 1986
- Wild Life for Man (with Norman Arlott) 1986
- Collins Guide to the Countryside in Winter (Collins Handguide) (with Alastair Fitter) 1988
- Wild Flowers (Collins Gem Series) (with Martin Walters) 1999
- The Wild Flowers of Britain and Ireland: The Complete Guide to the British and Irish Flora (with Alastair Fitter, Marjorie Blamey) 2003

=== As editor ===
- Clare, John (1982). Eric Robinson and Richard Fitter (ed.). John Clare's Birds. Illustrated by Robert Gillmor. Oxford. ISBN 0192129775.

=== Journals ===
- "Rapid Changes in Flowering Time in British Plants" (with A. H. Fitter) Science Vol. 296, Issue 5573, 1689–1691, 2002
