= The Orchid Review =

Scientific review

Front cover of The Orchid Review from June 2021. The cover photograph is of Bulbophyllum saltatorium var. albociliatum taken by Howard Rice

The Orchid Review, published annually by the Royal Horticultural Society, is a magazine 'dedicated to the celebration and deeper understanding of orchids'. It is the world's oldest existing periodical devoted to orchids and each issue features articles by internationally acclaimed experts on subjects such as cultivation, in-depth plant profiles, historical investigation, orchid exploration and all the latest from the world of orchid growing and showing.

== Subject matter ==
Its subject matter includes:

- Profiles and evaluations of orchid genera, species and hybrids of horticultural merit
- Recent orchid introductions and descriptions of new orchids
- New or advanced cultivation and propagation techniques
- RHS awards to orchids
- Developments in orchid taxonomy and changes to names of orchids
- Orchid exploration and travel
- Orchid conservation
- Advances in plant breeding and development of new orchids
- Profiles of orchid growers and breeders

== History ==
The Orchid Review was founded by Robert Allen Rolfe who single-handedly produced and edited 28 volumes. The first monthly issue appeared on 1 January 1893. Rolfe worked in the orchid herbarium at Royal Botanic Gardens, Kew but there was no mention in the periodical of his position there and his name never appeared on the title page. The journal was devoted to orchid cultivation and the increasingly important hybridisation of orchids.

Each issue opened with news and gossip under the heading of ‘Notes’, and later called ‘Our Note Book’. Reports of visits to notable collections were a regular feature, the first was to Sir Trevor Lawrence at Burford Lodge, Dorking, Surrey. ‘The Calendar of Operations’ outlined the tasks for the month ahead and was for the first year written by Lawrence’s gardener, W.H. White. John Weathers contributed ‘Orchids at the RHS’ which described plants shown to the RHS Orchid Committee each month. From May 1897 the meetings of the Manchester and North of England Orchid Society were covered. Gradually, over the years, the number of illustrations increased.

In 1909 Rolfe, with Charles Hurst, published The Orchid Stud Book as a companion volume to The Orchid Review. It listed all the hybrids recorded up to the end of 1907 with their parents, any synonyms and references, and numerous photographs.

World War I did not influence the frequency of publication, apart from the Nov/Dec 1917 issue. Then, from July 1918, it was published bimonthly, due to increases in cost of postage and paper. Following Rolfe’s sudden illness and subsequent death it ceased publication for the first six months of 1921. On 5 July 1921 a new company, The Orchid Review Ltd, was incorporated and a new editor, Alfred Gurney Wilson (1878–1957), was appointed. Starting in 1910 he had previously published and edited The Orchid World, with similar content to The Orchid Review, but that periodical had only continued until 1916, when Wilson was called up for military service.

When The Orchid Review reappeared in July 1921 it had a similar format to before the war and was monthly once more. There were a few minor changes, including H.G. Alexander now writing the 'Cultural Notes', and the style was not as chatty but more factual and drier. It still only had a couple of photographs in each issue and, like Rolfe, Wilson did not sign his articles. During Wilson’s tenure strong links were developed with orchid enthusiasts in the United States.

Wilson retired in 1932 and the post was taken by Charles Curtis (1869–1958). Curtis was already a well-known horticultural journalist although he had started out wanting to be a plant hunter like his uncle, also Charles Curtis, a collector for James Veitch & Sons. The new ‘Men, Matters & Memories’ column by Curtis contained reminiscences of people and places, or comments by Curtis on recent orchid-related events. Otherwise, the format remained the same. The periodical was bimonthly throughout World War II, with a reduced number of pages, but returned to monthly after the war.

=== After World War II ===
In early 1958 Curtis was forced to rest more and John Blowers (1921–2009) was employed as his assistant, although Curtis still did most of the editing, producing it from his bedside. Blowers, who was orchid grower for the Honourable Nellie Ionides at Buxted Park, East Sussex, became editor after Curtis’s death and his first issue appeared in May 1958. Initially, there was little change. After a successful appeal for more articles, news and photographs the first ever redesign occurred in 1959. It resulted in a new green cover, updated fonts and layout, and additional photos. There were also new contributors, including more from overseas, and news from amateur orchid societies. Within three years Blowers had trebled the subscribers. He resigned at the end of 1969 due to pressures of work and numerous other commitments.

Blowers was succeeded by David Sander (1911–1975), nurseryman and grandson of the ‘Orchid King’, nurseryman Frederick Sander. In 1972 the format was briefly changed to a larger size, but this proved so unpopular it lasted just a year.

=== Increasing costs ===
By 1973 increased printing and production costs meant the subscription price had been increased twice in three years. Publication deadlines were a constant challenge due to repeated postal strikes, power cuts and a three-day working week. Sander resigned at start of 1974 but remained as a director until his death.

The next editor was Brian Williams (1934–2015), orchid grower for Sir Robert Sainsbury and Lady Lisa Sainsbury at Bucklebury, Berkshire. A cover redesign in 1975 resulted in a silver background to enhance the colour photos. By reducing the amount of colour and increasing the number of subscribers the 1972 deficit was reduced. However, printing costs continued to rise and the subscription price had to be increased again. In November 1975 the number of pages was decreased by eight and a smaller font employed. The Stanley Smith Horticultural Trust agreed to support the colour reproduction and the directors, together with Eric Young and Lady Lisa Sainsbury, put up substantial amounts of personal cash to offset the continuing deficit.

In December 1978 Williams resigned and Wilma Rittershausen (1939–2011), the first female editor, took over. She worked with her brother Brian in the family business, Burnham Nurseries, at Kingsteignton in Devon. Once appointed, she reduced her hours at the nursery and left the running of the business to Brian. She set about improving the periodical’s finances and by the end of 1979 the books were balanced. Initially, there were just two pages of colour and numerous black and white photographs. Gradually the amount of colour increased, until 1985 when it became full colour. One of her innovations was the publication of supplements, such as annual ones for RHS awards, one on the World Orchid Conference held in Durban, and one on the International Centenary Orchid Conference held at the Royal Horticultural Halls, London, in 1985. She resigned at the end of 1985 when Burnham Nurseries relocated to Newton Abbot in Devon.

Her successor, Christopher Bailes (b. 1951), was manager of the Eric Young Orchid Foundation in Jersey. One major improvement during Bailes’s editorship was the significant increase of colour in each issue, partly financed by donations to a 'colour fund'. However, the financial position of the periodical remained precarious. In March 1988 an agreement was reached for the Royal Horticultural Society to hold a quarter of the shares and pay £4,000 annually towards the costs. In autumn of the same year Bailes left the Eric Young Orchid Foundation and became curator of RHS Garden Rosemoor, but remained editor until the end of 1989.

=== Hand-over to the RHS ===
John Blowers stepped in as editor for another couple of years until Phil Seaton (b. 1948) was appointed in 1992, editing the centenary volume of 1993 which consisted of just 10 parts. At the end of 1992 the Royal Horticultural Society agreed to take on full responsibility for the technically insolvent publication. The board of directors was dissolved, the company wound up and the Royal Horticultural Society selected Wilma Rittershausen to return as the new editor.

It was relaunched with more pages, more colour and issued bimonthly with new writers. The balance of the periodical was finely tuned to satisfy the needs of both new and more experienced growers. Rittershausen retired at the end of 2000 and was followed by Dr Henry Oakeley (b. 1941) for the first three issues for 2001. Following a review by the Royal Horticultural Society, Isobyl la Croix (b. 1933) was put in charge. She would go on to edit the journal for the next eight years, overseeing the transition to digital publishing. Before 2005 colour could only be on every other double page until the Royal Horticultural Society's publications department in Peterborough undertook the design. It heralded a revamp with a new cover, text in three rather than two columns and the news section expanded to four pages. At the end of 2008 the periodical became quarterly. Sarah Forsyth (b. 1972), who had a background in horticultural journalism, took over as editor in January 2010. She was joined by an editorial panel of six people and the news section expanded to six pages. She continued until James Armitage (b. 1976), editor of The Plantsman and previously a botanist at RHS Garden Wisley, was appointed as editor in early 2020.

The Orchid Review became an annual publication in 2023. The final quarterly issue was dated December 2022, and the first annual issue (dated 2023, and styled as a yearbook) was published in October 2023.

== Editors ==
Robert Allen Rolfe 1893–1921
Alfred Gurney Wilson 1921–1932
Charles Curtis 1933–1958
John Blowers 1958–1969 & 1990–1991
David Sander 1970–1974
Brian Williams 1974–1978
Wilma Rittershausen 1978–1985 & 1993–2000
Christopher Bailes 1986–1989
Phil Seaton 1992–1993
Henry Oakeley Jan.–Mar. 2001
Isobyl la Croix Apr. 2001–2009
Sarah Forsyth (née Brooks) 2010–2020
James Armitage 2020–
