= BBC Gardeners' World =

British gardening magazine

- Cover of the July 2024 issue
- Categories: Gardening
- Frequency: Monthly
- Total circulation (Jan-June 2016): 175,733
- Founded: 1991
- Company: Immediate Media Company
- Country: United Kingdom
- Language: English
- Website: www.gardenersworld.com

BBC Gardeners' World is a monthly British gardening magazine owned by Immediate Media Company, containing tips for gardening from past and current presenters of the television series Gardeners' World.

== History and profile ==
BBC Gardeners' World was established in 1991. The magazine is part of Immediate Media Company and is published on a monthly basis. It often has offers on plants, free supplements and giveaways. Copies are sold at newsagents and by subscription.

The circulation of BBC Gardeners' World was 237,650 copies for the first half of 2013. Its circulation dropped to 219,222 copies for the first half of 2014.

== Contributors ==
Contributors have included:

- Monty Don
- Lucy Felton
- Carol Klein

== Show ==
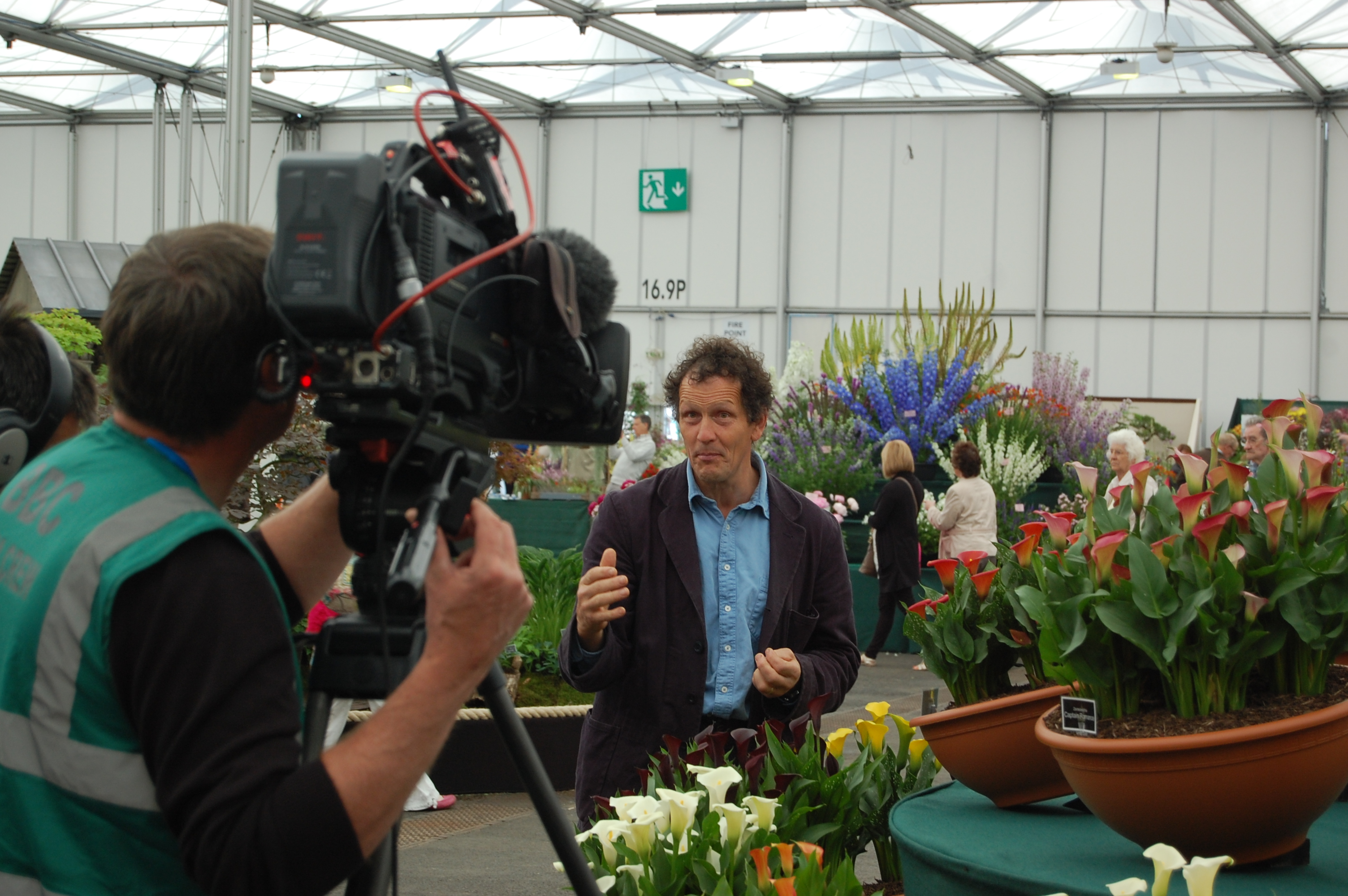
Monty Don records a piece to camera, for the programme, at Gardeners' World Live 2012

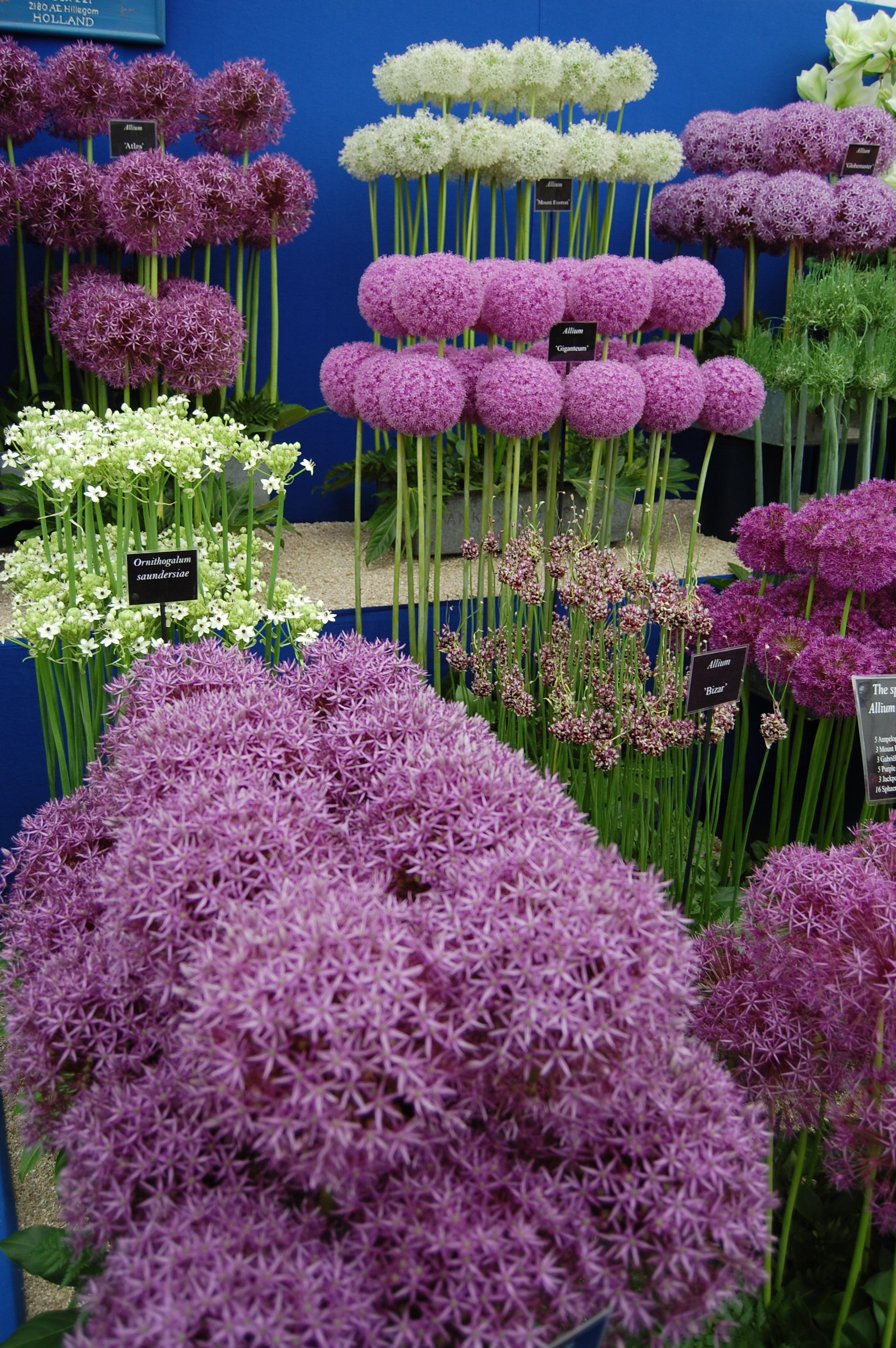
Selection of cultivated Alliums displayed at the 2011 show.

A trade show and floral exhibition, Gardeners' World Live, promoted by the magazine, is held every June at the National Exhibition Centre near Birmingham. Presenters from the show usually make guest appearances.

== See also ==
- List of horticultural magazines
