= Norman Arlott =

Norman Arlott (1947–2022) was one Britain's most noted scientific illustrators of birds. His field guide illustrations in A Field Guide to the Birds of East Africa written by John Williams and published in the Collins field guide series being particularly noteworthy.
