= Horticulture Week =

British horticultural periodical

HortWeek is a British horticultural periodical, covering nursery production, garden retail, landscaping, arboriculture, garden heritage, groundsmanship and amenity horticulture.

== History and profile ==
Horticulture Week was established in 1840. The publisher is Haymarket Group.

In November 2006 the magazine's publisher Haymarket Group bought rival horticulture magazine Grower, which is now incorporated into Horticulture Week, expanding its coverage into edibles production.

In 2008 the website of Horticulture Week was started.

The magazine is normally read by around 25,000 subscribers. However, in 2020 this rose to 300,000 through trial subscriptions as interest in gardening increased during the UK lockdown in the COVID-19 pandemic.

In 2022 Horticulture Week rebranded as HortWeek which heralded a website redesign and editorial content refresh.

HortWeek continues to be the leading UK publication covering the whole of the horticulture sector.

== See also ==
- List of horticultural magazines
