= Canadian Gardening =

Canadian magazine

- May 2010 cover of Canadian Gardening
- Frequency: Bimonthly
- Total circulation: 100,017 (December 2011)
- First issue: February 1990
- Final issue: March 2016
- Company: Transcontinental Media
- Country: Canada
- Based in: Toronto
- Language: English
- Website: www.canadiangardening.com
- ISSN: 0847-3463

Canadian Gardening was a bimonthly magazine published in Canada. It covered various topics related to gardening, including garden profiles, gardening techniques, recipes, projects, design ideas, regional information, and events.

== History ==
Canadian Gardening was first published in February 1990, by Avid Media, which owned it until 2004 when it was acquired by Transcontinental Media.

== Readership and Awards ==
Published eight times a year, the magazine had a readership of more than 2.5 million gardeners. In 2007, it was awarded Best Magazine of the Year in the best-selling magazine category, while editor-in-chief Aldona Satterthwaite received an Editor of the Year award from the Canadian Society of Magazine Editors.

== Closure ==
In February 2016, it was announced that the magazine and its website would be closed following the Spring issue. The last issue was published in March 2016.
