= Gravetye Manor =

Manor house located near East Grinstead

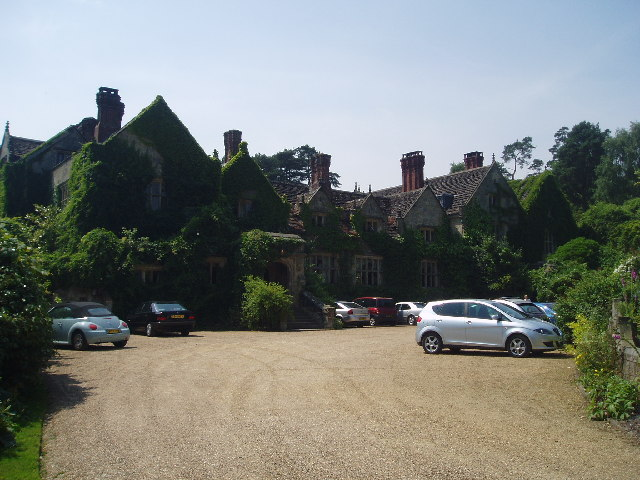
- Interactive map of Gravetye Manor

Restaurant information
- Rating: (Michelin Guide)
- Location: East Grinstead, West Sussex, England
- Coordinates: 51°05′21″N 0°03′25″W
- Website: www.gravetyemanor.co.uk

Gravetye Manor is a manor house located near East Grinstead, West Sussex, England. The former home of landscape gardener William Robinson, it is now a hotel and restaurant holding, in 2020, one star in the Michelin Guide, and is listed Grade I on the National Heritage List for England, its gardens are also Grade II* listed on the Register of Historic Parks and Gardens.

== History ==
The two-storey Elizabethan house was built in 1598 by Richard Infield, an ironmaster, for his new bride Katherine Compton.

It was the home of William Robinson, author of The English Flower Garden, from 1884 until his death in 1935. He commissioned architect Sir Ernest George to add a matching wing to the northeast and developed the garden into one of the most famous in England. After his death it and the surrounding 1,000 acres (400 ha) natural landscaped grounds were left to the Forestry Commission. Used as a base for Canadian Army soldiers during World War II, who dug out parts of Robinson's garden to plant potatoes and leeks to supplement their rations, postwar it was left derelict for many years.

== Country house hotel ==
In 1958, the property and grounds were leased to business partners Robin Howard, and restaurateur Peter Herbert and his first wife Pip. Herbert was later considered a pioneer of the country house hotel, turning the property into a 17 bedroom hotel which, through use of a noted kitchen garden, gained its Michelin star. During his 40 years of ownership, Herbert also restored Robinson's core 52 acres (21 ha) of natural gardens (which cost £50,000 per annum to maintain), with the hotel and kitchen becoming rated one of the UK's top five hotels.

In 2004, Peter Herbert and his second wife Sue retired to a cottage on the house lands, and sold the business to Andrew Russell and chef Mark Raffan, under whose management, following the Great Recession, the business fell into administration early in 2010. After the administrators agreed a deal with Von Essen Hotels, in March 2010 the property lease was bought by long-term guest and professional investor Jeremy Hosking, who has since invested £2.5M in the property and gardens. He has also invested in a new building infilling the courtyard to provide a new restaurant designed by architect Sir Charles Knowles, another long-term guest. The gardens still exist and are accessible to hotel guests.
