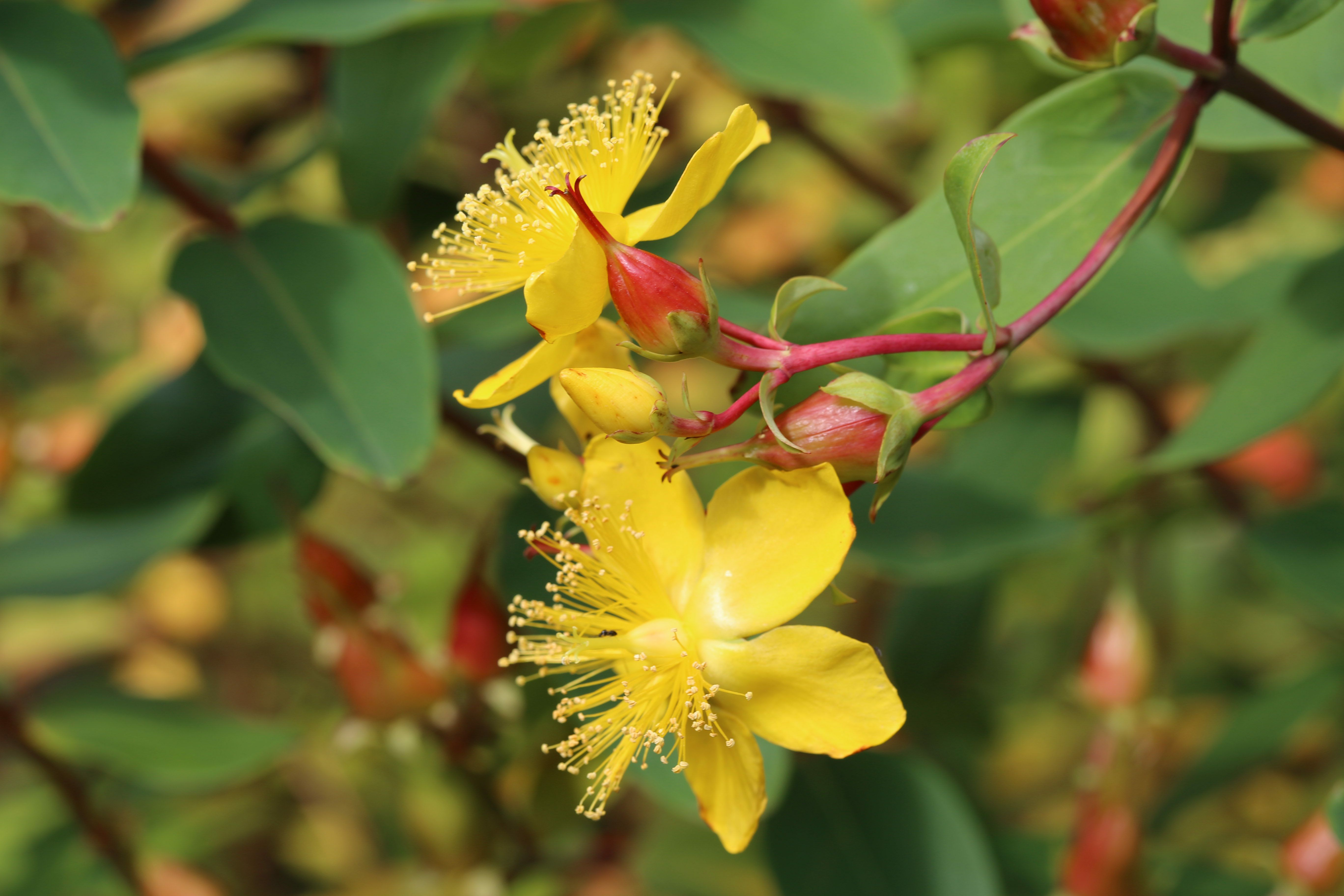
- Flowers
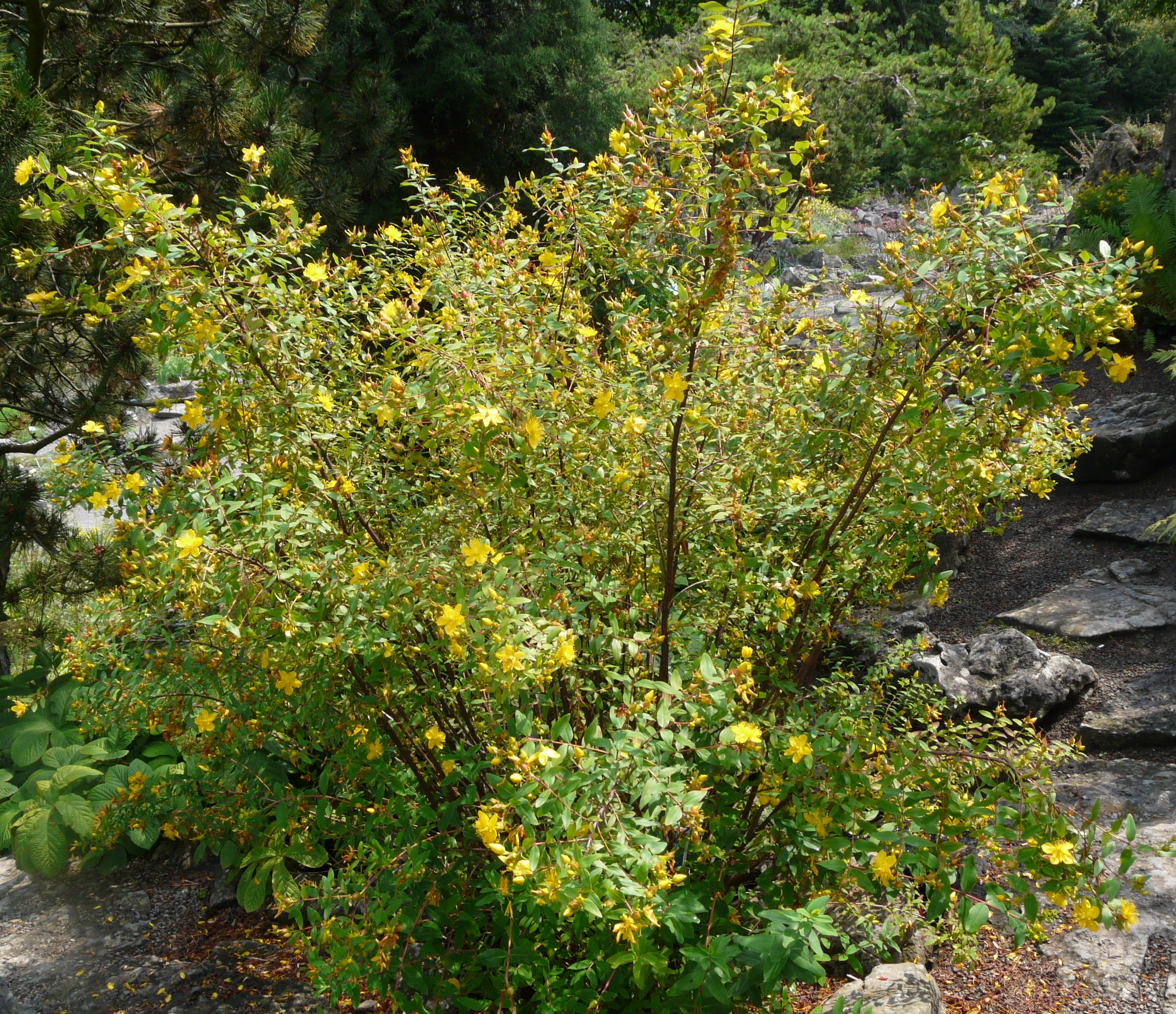
- Habit

Scientific classification
- Kingdom: Plantae
- Clade: Tracheophytes
- Clade: Angiosperms
- Clade: Eudicots
- Clade: Rosids
- Order: Malpighiales
- Family: Hypericaceae
- Genus: Hypericum
- Section: H. sect. Ascyreia
- Species: H. pseudohenryi

Binomial name
- Hypericum pseudohenryi N.Robson

= Hypericum pseudohenryi =

Species of flowering plant in the St John's wort family

Hypericum pseudohenryi, called the Irish tutsan, is a species of flowering plant in the family Hypericaceae, endemic to China. It is an evergreen shrub up to about 0.8 m (2.6 ft) tall with arching stems, growing in a mounded habit. Its cup-shaped yellow flowers, with conspicuous golden stamens, are produced from midsummer to early autumn. The species has been awarded the Royal Horticultural Society's Award of Garden Merit. It is invasive in South Africa.
