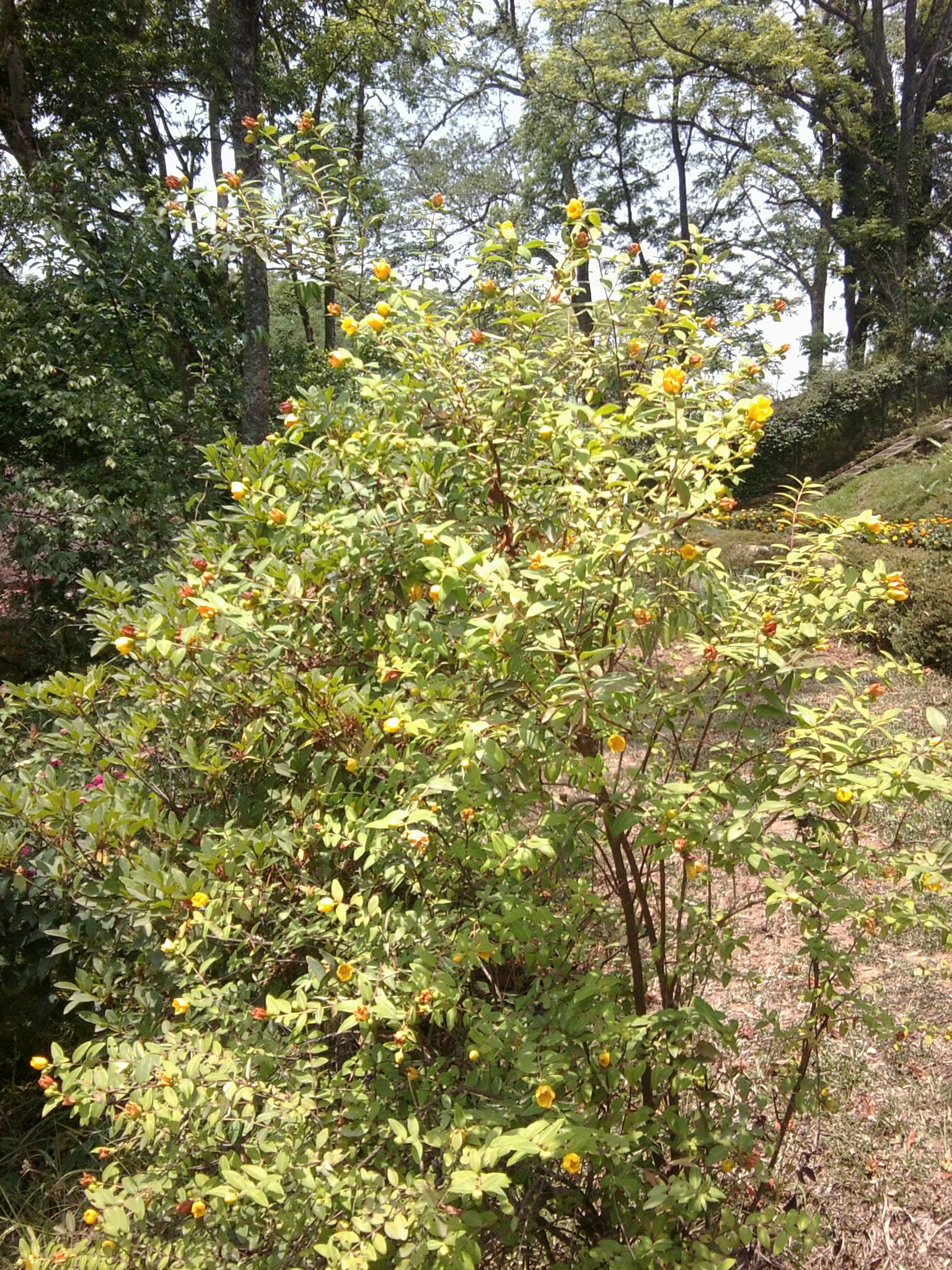

Scientific classification
- Kingdom: Plantae
- Clade: Tracheophytes
- Clade: Angiosperms
- Clade: Eudicots
- Clade: Rosids
- Order: Malpighiales
- Family: Hypericaceae
- Genus: Hypericum
- Section: H. sect. Ascyreia
- Species: H. uralum

Binomial name
- Hypericum uralum Buch.-Ham. ex D. Don

= Hypericum uralum =

Species of flowering plant in the St John's wort family

Hypericum uralum is a species of flowering plant in the St. John's wort family Hypericaceae. Its native range includes China, Bhutan, India, Nepal, Pakistan and Myanmar.
