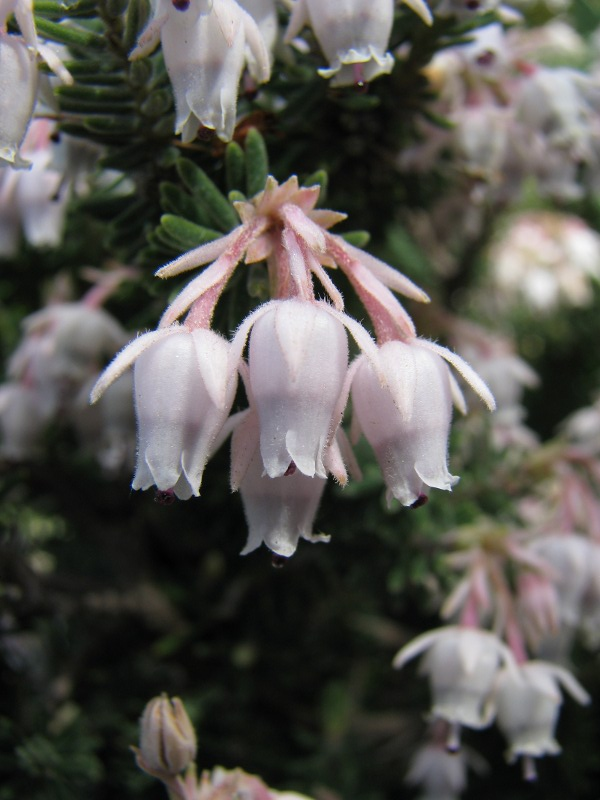

Scientific classification
- Kingdom: Plantae
- Clade: Tracheophytes
- Clade: Angiosperms
- Clade: Eudicots
- Clade: Asterids
- Order: Ericales
- Family: Ericaceae
- Genus: Erica
- Species: E. sicula

Binomial name
- Erica sicula Guss.

= Erica sicula =

Species of flowering plant

Erica sicula is a plant belonging to the genus Erica. The plant is native to Libya, Lebanon, Cyprus, Sicily, Syria and Turkey.
