= The Garden (Royal Horticultural Society) =

Monthly magazine of the British Royal Horticultural Society

- Editor: Tom Howard
- Categories: Gardening
- Frequency: Monthly
- Publisher: Royal Horticultural Society
- First issue: 1866
- Country: United Kingdom
- Based in: Peterborough
- Website: www.rhs.org.uk/about-the-rhs/publications/magazines/the-garden/

The Garden is the monthly magazine of the British Royal Horticultural Society (RHS), circulated to all the society's members as a benefit of membership; it is also sold to the public.

== History ==
The Garden magazine has gone under this title since 1975; it was chosen to commemorate the magazine of the same name first published by William Robinson in 1871. Before 1975 it had been (since 1866) The Journal of the Royal Horticultural Society, a phrase that remained as the magazine's cover subtitle until 2007.

Prior to 1866, the Horticultural Society of London (which became Royal on the granting of a Royal Charter in 1861 from Prince Albert, its patron since 1858) had published The Transactions of the Horticultural Society of London (7 volumes, 1805–1830) and The Proceedings of the Horticultural Society of London (1838–1868), as well as The Journal of the Horticultural Society of London (9 volumes, 1846–1855). Extracts from the Proceedings were published as supplements to the Journal from 1889 onwards.

== Contributors ==
Over its long history, most of Britain's most influential gardeners, garden writers and horticulturists have contributed articles to the publication, whether as The Journal of the Royal Horticultural Society or, later, The Garden. In recent years, Christopher Lloyd was a frequent contributor (until his death in January 2006), and the noted plantsman Roy Lancaster has a regular column. Hugh Johnson, the magazine's Editorial Consultant for many years, contributed a monthly column, Tradescant's Diary, from 1975 until December 2006.

== Format and design ==
From its relaunch in 1975 as The Garden until December 1987 the publication was roughly A5 in size; in 1988 the dimensions were increased slightly; in 1992 the format was radically altered. The current page size is 276 x 210mm, slightly shorter than A4. The magazine's layout has undergone several major "refreshes" and redesigns, most recently in 1995, 2000, 2007 and 2011.

== Editors ==
The current editor is Tom Howard, former acting editor and deputy editor of NME, who joined in December 2020.

His predecessor was Chris Young (former editor of the Garden Design Journal), who joined the editorial team as Deputy Editor in 2005. His predecessor was Ian Hodgson, who held the post from June 1993 until December 2010, who continues to contribute to the magazine as an author.

Earlier, Susanne Mitchell had held the post from April 1989, having taken over from Elspeth Napier.

== See also ==
- List of horticultural magazines

== Bibliography ==
- Elliott, Brent (2004). The Royal Horticultural Society: A History 1804–2004. Phillimore. ISBN 978-1-86077-272-6
- "Royal Horticultural Society". Scholarly Societies Project. University of Waterloo. Archived from the original on 16 July 2015.
