= Hypericum beanii =

Scientific classification
- Kingdom: Plantae
- Clade: Tracheophytes
- Clade: Angiosperms
- Clade: Eudicots
- Clade: Rosids
- Order: Malpighiales
- Family: Hypericaceae
- Genus: Hypericum
- Section: H. sect. Ascyreia
- Species: H. beanii

Binomial name
- Hypericum beanii N.Robson

Species of flowering plant in the St John's wort family

Hypericum beanii is a species of flowering plant in the family Hypericaceae that is found in China. Its flowers are yellow and bloom in summer.
