= Garden Culture =

Gardening magazine

Garden Culture Magazine
- Executive Editor: Celia Sayers
- Staff writers: Catherine Sherriffs
- Frequency: Bi-monthly
- Publisher: 325 Media Inc.
- Total circulation: 280,000 (2013)
- First issue: 2011 (NL); 2012 (UK); 2013 (US); 2012 (AU)
- Country: Netherlands; USA; Canada; United Kingdom; Australia
- Based in: Canada
- Language: English
- Website: gardenculturemagazine.com
- ISSN: 2211-9329

Garden Culture is a print and digital publication focused on urban agriculture, (indoor) gardening, and progressive gardening techniques. The magazine covers a wide range of topics such as sustainable living, hydroponics, organic gardening, urban farming, and gardening projects and design ideas. It aims to teach readers how to become better growers by providing expert tips, innovative growing methods, and solutions to common gardening challenges. The editorial team consists of seasoned gardeners, urban farmers, and progressive gardening experts committed to home growing and sharing the latest knowledge worldwide.

Garden Culture Magazine also emphasizes social and environmental consciousness, addressing issues like the disconnect with food and medicine, including cannabis cultivation. It features articles on topics such as botanical brews, soil mixes, cloning mushrooms, and nutrient management, along with profiles of growers and urban farming initiatives.

== History ==
Garden Culture Magazine was first published in February 2011 in the Netherlands, initially as a quarterly magazine for the Dutch market before expanding internationally and switching to a bi-monthly schedule and distributed internationally to garden stores in the United States, Canada, United Kingdom, Ireland, Australia, and New Zealand.
