= Alastair Fitter =

British ecologist (born 1948)

Alastair Hugh Fitter CBE FRS (born 20 June 1948) is a British ecologist at the University of York.

Fitter was educated at Oxford and at Liverpool, and came to the Department of Biology in York in 1972. In 2004 he was appointed Pro-Vice-Chancellor, with the Research portfolio. He is a member of Council of the Natural Environment Research Council.

Fitter's research interests include plant and microbial behaviour in a changing world; functional ecology of roots and mycorrhizal associations under field conditions; root system architecture; carbon cycling in soil, especially in relation to mycorrhizas; phenological responses to climate change.

Alastair Fitter is the son of the naturalist and author Richard Fitter (1913–2005), and together in 2002 they published an article in Science on the changing phenology of wild flowers due to global warming. They have also collaborated on numerous field guides and other natural history books.

Fitter was elected Fellow of the Royal Society (FRS) in 2005. He was appointed Commander of the Order of the British Empire (CBE) in the 2010 New Year Honours for services to environmental science. He received a President's Medal from the British Ecological Society, and in 2024 was awarded the Cadbury Medal from The Wildlife Trusts.
