= William Robinson (gardener) =

Irish gardener and journalist (1838–1935)

- Born: 15 July 1838
- Died: 12 May 1935 (aged 96)
- Occupations: Gardener and journalist
- Known for: Many influential ideas in gardening and landscaping, including woodland gardens and natural-looking planting

"A Devonshire Cottage Garden, Cockington, Torquay" from The English Flower Garden, engraving from a photograph.

William Robinson: FLS (15 July 1838 – 12 May 1935) was an Irish practical gardener and journalist whose ideas about wild gardening spurred the movement that led to the popularising of the English cottage garden, a parallel to the search for honest simplicity and vernacular style of the British Arts and Crafts movement, and were important in promoting the woodland garden. Robinson is credited as an early practitioner of the mixed herbaceous border of hardy perennial plants, a champion too of the "wild garden", who vanquished the high Victorian pattern garden of planted-out bedding schemes. Robinson's new approach to gardening gained popularity through his magazines and several books—particularly The Wild Garden, illustrated by Alfred Parsons, and The English Flower Garden.

Robinson advocated more natural and less formal-looking plantings of hardy perennials, shrubs, and climbers, and reacted against the High Victorian patterned gardening, which used tropical materials grown in greenhouses. He railed against standard roses, statuary, sham Italian gardens, and other artifices common in gardening at the time. Modern gardening practices first introduced by Robinson include: using alpine plants in rock gardens; dense plantings of perennials and groundcovers that expose no bare soil; use of hardy perennials and native plants; and large plantings of perennials in natural-looking drifts.

== Life and career ==
Robinson began his garden work at an early age, as a garden boy for the Marquess of Waterford at Curraghmore, County Waterford. From there, he went to the estate of an Irish baronet in Ballykilcavan, County Laois, Sir Hunt Johnson-Walsh, and was put in charge of a large number of greenhouses at the age of 21. According to one account, as the result of a bitter quarrel, one cold winter night in 1861 he let the fires go out, killing many valuable plants. Other accounts consider the story to be a gross exaggeration. Whether in haste after the greenhouse incident or not, Robinson left for Dublin in 1861, where the influence of David Moore, head of the botanical garden at Glasnevin, a family friend, helped him find work at the Botanical Gardens of Regent's Park, London, where he was given responsibility for the hardy herbaceous plants, specialising in British wildflowers.

At that time, the Royal Horticultural Society's Kensington gardens were being designed and planted with vast numbers of greenhouse flowers in mass plantings. Robinson wrote that "it was not easy to get away from all this false and hideous "art"." But his work with native British plants did allow him to get away to the countryside, where he "began to get an idea (which should be taught to every boy at school) that there was (for gardens even) much beauty in our native flowers and trees."

Robinson was a vegetarian.

=== Writing ===
"Colonies of Poet's Narcissus and Broad Leaved Saxifrage" from The Wild Garden, illustration by Alfred Parsons.

In 1866, at the age of 29, he became a fellow of the Linnean Society under the sponsorship of Charles Darwin, James Veitch, David Moore, and seven other distinguished botanists and horticulturists. Two months later, he left Regents Park to write for The Gardener's Chronicle and The Times, and represented the leading horticultural firm of Veitch at the 1867 Paris Exhibition. He began writing many of his publications, beginning with Gleanings from French Gardens in 1868, The Parks, Gardens, and Promenades of Paris in 1869, and Alpine Flowers for Gardens, Mushroom Culture, and The Wild Garden in 1870. In 1871 he launched his own gardening journal, simply named The Garden, which over the years included contributions from notables such as John Ruskin, Oliver Wendell Holmes, Gertrude Jekyll, William Morris, Dean Hole, Frank Miles, Canon Ellacombe, and James Britten. The Garden: An Illustrated Weekly Journal of Horticulture in All Its Branches was published from 1872 to 1927.

His most influential books were The Wild Garden (1870), which made his reputation and allowed him to start his magazine, and The English Flower Garden (1883), which he revised in edition after edition and included contributions from his long-time friend Gertrude Jekyll, among others. She later edited The Garden for a couple of years and contributed many articles to his publications, which also included Gardening Illustrated (from 1879).

He first met Jekyll in 1875—they were in accord in their design principles and maintained a close friendship and professional association for over 50 years. He helped her on her garden at Munstead Wood; she provided plants for his garden at Gravetye Manor. Jekyll wrote about Robinson that:

...when English gardening was mostly represented by the innate futilities of the "bedding" system, with its wearisome repetitions and garish colouring, Mr William Robinson chose as his work in life to make better known the treasures that were lying neglected, and at the same time to overthrow the feeble follies of the "bedding" system. It is mainly owing to his unremitting labours that a clear knowledge of the world of hardy-plant beauty is now placed within easy reach of all who care to acquire it, and that the "bedding mania" is virtually dead.

Robinson also published God's Acre Beautiful or The Cemeteries of The Future, in which he applied his gardening aesthetic to urban churchyards and cemeteries. His campaign included trying to win an unwilling public to the advantages of cremation over burial, and he quite freely shared unsavoury stories of what happened in certain crowded graveyards. He was instrumental in the founding of Golders Green Crematorium and designed the gardens there, which replaced the traditional Victorian mourning graveyard with open lawn, flowerbeds, and woodland gardens.

=== Gravetye Manor ===
"The Wild Garden: view in Moat Mead, Gravetye Manor, with Poet's Narcissus in bloom in early summer 1891, planted five years" from The English Flower Garden, sketch by W. E. Norton.

With his writing career a financial success, in 1884 Robinson was able to purchase the Elizabethan Gravetye Manor near East Grinstead in Sussex, along with about 200 acres (0.81 km^{2}) of rich pasture and woodland. His diary of planting and care was published as Gravetye Manor, or Twenty Years of the Work round an old Manor House (1911). Gravetye would find practical fulfilment of many of Robinson's ideas of a more natural style of gardening. Eventually it would grow to nearly 1,000 acres (4 km^{2}).

Much of the estate had been managed as a coppiced woodland, giving Robinson the opportunity to plant drifts of scilla, cyclamen, and narcissus between the coppiced hazels and chestnuts. On the edges, and in the cleared spaces in the woods, Robinson established plantings of Japanese anemone, lily, acanthus, and pampas grass, along with shrubs such as fothergilla, stewartia, and nyssa. Closer to the house he had some flower beds; throughout he planted red valerian, which he allowed to spread naturally around paving and staircases. Robinson planted thousands of daffodils annually, including 100,000 narcissi planted along one of the lakes in 1897. Over the years he added hundreds of trees, some of them from American friends Charles Sprague Sargent and Frederick Law Olmsted. Other features included an oval-shaped walled kitchen garden, a heather garden, and a water garden with one of the largest collections of water lilies in Europe.

Robinson invited several well-known painters to portray his own landscape artistry, including the English watercolourist Beatrice Parsons, the landscape and botanical painter Henry Moon, and Alfred Parsons. Moon and Parsons illustrated many of Robinson's works.

After Robinson's death, Gravetye Manor and the Estate were left to a publicly owned charity. In 1958, the Manor house and gardens were leased to a restaurateur who refurbished the gardens, replacing some of the flower beds with lawn. Today, the Manor serves as a hotel and restaurant. The Estate as a whole is managed by the William Robinson Gravetye Charity.

=== Long-term impact on gardening ===
Through his magazines and books, Robinson challenged many gardening traditions and introduced new ideas that have become commonplace today. He is most linked with introducing the herbaceous border, which he referred to by the older name of 'mixed border'—it included a mixture of shrubs, hardy and half-hardy herbaceous plants. He also advocated dense plantings that left no bare soil, with the spaces between taller plants filled with what are now commonly called ground cover plants. Even his rose garden at Gravetye was filled with saxifrage between and under the roses. Following a visit to the Alps, Robinson wrote Alpine Flowers for Gardens, which for the first time showed how to use alpine plants in a designed rock garden.

His most significant influence was the introduction of the idea of naturalistic gardening, which first appeared in The Wild Garden and was further developed in The English Flower Garden. The idea of introducing large drifts of native hardy perennial plants into meadow, woodland, and waterside is taken for granted today, but was revolutionary in Robinson's time. In the first edition, he recommended any plant that could be naturalised, including half-hardy perennials and natives from other parts of the world—thus Robinson's wild garden was not limited to locally native species. Robinson's own garden at Gravetye was planted on a large scale, but his wild garden idea could be realised in small yards, where the 'garden' is designed to appear to merge into the surrounding woodland or meadow. Robinson's ideas continue to influence gardeners and landscape architects today—from home and cottage gardens to large estate and public gardens.

== The Wild Garden, 1870 ==
"Edge Hall, Malpas, Cheshire. Lawn garden with hardy flowers in beds and groups" from The English Flower Garden, engraving from a photograph.

In The Wild Garden Robinson set forth fresh gardening principles that expanded the idea of garden and introduced themes and techniques that are taken for granted today, notably that of "naturalised" plantings. Robinson's audience were not the owners of intensely gardened suburban plots, nor dwellers in gentrified country cottages seeking a nostalgic atmosphere; nor was Robinson concerned with the immediate surroundings of the English country house. Robinson's wild garden brought the untidy edges, where garden blended into the larger landscape into the garden picture: meadow, water's edge, woodland edges and openings.

The hardy plants Robinson endorsed were not all natives by any means: two chapters are devoted to the hardy plants from other temperate climate zones that were appropriate to naturalising schemes. The narcissus he preferred were the small, delicate ones from the Iberian peninsula. Meadowflowers included goldenrod and asters, rampant spreaders from North America long familiar in English gardens. Nor did Robinson's 'wild' approach refer to letting gardens return to their natural state—he taught a specific gardening method and aesthetic. The nature of plants' habit of growth and their cultural preferences dictated the free design, in which human intervention was to be kept undetectable.

Without being in any sense retrograde, Robinson's book brought attention back to the plants, which had been eclipsed since the decline of "gardenesque" plantings of the 1820s and 30s, during the use of tender annuals as massed colour in patterned schemes of the mid-century. The book's popularity was largely due to Robinson's promise that wild gardening could be easy and beautiful; that the use of hardy perennials would be less expensive and offer more variety than the frequent mass planting of greenhouse annuals; and that it followed nature, which he considered the source of all true design.

== The English Flower Garden, 1883 ==
In The English Flower Garden, Robinson laid down the principles that revolutionised the art of gardening. Robinson's source of inspiration was the simple cottage garden, long neglected by the fashionable landscapists. In The English Flower Garden he rejected the artificial and the formal, specifically statuary, topiary, carpet bedding, and waterworks—comparing the modern garden to "the lifeless formality of wall-paper or carpet." The straight lines and form in many gardens were seen by Robinson to "carry the dead lines of the builder into the garden." He admired nature's diversity, and promoted creepers and ramblers, smaller plantings of roses, herbaceous plants and bulbs, woodland plants, and winter flowers.

Robinson compared gardening to art, and wrote in the first chapter:

The gardener must follow the true artist, however modestly, in his respect for things as they are, in delight in natural form and beauty of flower and tree, if we are to be free from barren geometry, and if our gardens are ever to be true pictures....And as the artist's work is to see for us and preserve in pictures some of the beauty of landscape, tree, or flower, so the gardener's should be to keep for us as far as may be, in the fulness of their natural beauty, the living things themselves.

The first part of The English Flower Garden covered garden design, emphasising an approach that was individual and not stereotypical: "the best kind of garden grows out of the situation, as the primrose grows out of a cool bank." The second part covered individual plants, hardy and half-hardy, showing artistic and natural use of each plant—with several articles included from The Garden and chapters contributed by leading gardeners of the day, including Gertrude Jekyll, who contributed the chapter on "Colour in the Flower Garden"

This book was first published in 1883, with the last edition published in 1933. During Robinson's lifetime, the book found increasing popularity, with fifteen editions during his life. For fifty years, The English Flower Garden was considered a bible by many gardeners.

== See also ==
- Garden hotels
