= List of American magazines =

This is a list of American magazines.

== Asian community ==
- Giant Robot (online, print: 1994-2011)

== Automotive ==
- Automotive News (1925)
- Car and Driver (1955; 405,092)
- Diesel World (2007)
- Hot Rod (1948)
- Motor Trend (1949)
- Motorcycle Classics (2005)
- Road & Track (1947; 111,001)

== Black community ==
- The Black Cannabis Magazine (2021)
- Right On! (online, print discontinued in 2014, teenagers)

== Business and finance ==
=== Industry ===
- Aviation Week & Space Technology
- Design News

=== Finance ===
- Forbes
- Kiplinger's Personal Finance
- Modern Trader
- Technical Analysis of Stocks & Commodities

=== General ===
- Barron's
- Black Enterprise
- Bloomberg Businessweek
- The Chronicle
- Consumers Digest
- Consumer Reports
- The Economist
- Entrepreneur
- Fast Company
- Forbes
- Fortune
- Harvard Business Review
- Inc.
- Latin Trade
- MIT Sloan Management Review
- Optimize
- Site Selection
- The Wall Street Journal
- USA TODAY

== Children ==
- 3-2-1 Contact, Sesame Workshop (1979–2001)
- Academy Earth
- Action, Scholastic (19??–19??)
- American Girl (defunct)
- Bananas, Scholastic 2000
- Scout Life (Formerly Boys' Life)
- Children's Digest, Parents Magazine Press (1950-2009)
- Contact Kids, Sesame Workshop (1979–2001)
- Cricket (1973, pre-teens)
- Discovery Girls (defunct)
- Disney Adventures (defunct)
- Dynamite, Scholastic (1974–1992)
- The Electric Company Magazine, Scholastic (1972–1987)
- Enter, Sesame Workshop (1983–1985)
- The Friend (1902, mormon)
- Highlights for Children
- Hot Dog!, Scholastic (1979–199?)
- Jack and Jill, The Saturday Evening Post (1938-2009)
- Lego Magazine (defunct)
- Muse
- National Geographic Kids Magazine
- Nickelodeon Magazine (defunct)
- The Open Road for Boys (defunct)
- Peanut Butter, Scholastic (19??–19??)
- Ranger Rick
- Scope, Scholastic (19??–19??)
- Sesame Street Magazine, Sesame Workshop (1970–2008; continues online)
- Sesame Street Parents, Sesame Workshop (1981–2001)
- Spider
- Sports Illustrated Kids (1989; 107,202; sport)
- Sprint, Scholastic (197?–19??)
- Stone Soup
- SuperMag (1976-198?)
- Wow, Scholastic (1977–19??)
- Zoobooks

== Computing and electronics ==
- 2600: The Hacker Quarterly (1984)
- CIO magazine (online, print: 1987-2015)
- Linux Journal (1994-2019, 2020)
- Linux Magazine (1999, US edition)
- MacLife (online, print: 1996-2023)
- Macworld (online, print: 1984-2014)
- Maximum PC (online, print: 1996-2023)
- MIT Technology Review (1899; 208,658)
- Nuts and Volts (1980-2020, 2022)
- PC Magazine (online, print: 1982-2009)
- PCWorld (online, print: 1983-2013)
- SERVO Magazine (2003)
- Wired (1993; 540,265)

== Disabled community ==
- Logan (2006, teenagers)

== Engineering ==
=== Electronic ===
- Chemical & Engineering News (1923)
- EE Times (online, print: 1972-2012)
- Electronic Design (1952)
- Electronic Products (1957)
- IEEE Spectrum (1964)

== Entertainment and art ==
- Amazing Heroes (defunct)
- Architectural Digest
- Art in America
- ArtAsiaPacific
- Artforum
- ArteFuse
- Art Spiel
- The Artist's Magazine
- The Arts Fuse
- Castle of Frankenstein (defunct)
- Cinefantastique (defunct)
- Comics Buyer's Guide (defunct)
- Comics Journal
- Cultbytes
- Details (defunct)
- Disney Magazine (defunct)
- Dwell
- Entertainment Weekly
- Famous Monsters of Filmland
- The Feet, a dance magazine (1970–1973)
- Film Threat
- Flux (defunct)
- The Hollywood Reporter
- Home Media Magazine (defunct)
- IMPULSE Magazine
- Media Play News
- Modern Screen (defunct)
- Moving Pictures (defunct)
- Paste (magazine) (online; print 2002–2010)
- The Pastel Journal
- People
- Photoplay (defunct)
- Popular Photography (defunct)
- Premiere (defunct)
- Quilter's Newsletter (defunct)
- Sculptural Pursuit
- Shonen Jump (defunct)
- Soap Opera Digest (defunct)
- Soaps In Depth (defunct)
- Southwest Art
- Sports Illustrated
- TeRra Magazine
- TV Guide
- Video Watchdog (defunct)
- Visionaire
- Watercolor Artist
- Wizard (defunct)
- Whitehot Magazine
- Variety

== Folklore ==
- Árran
- Báiki
- Viltis

== Food and cooking ==
- Bon Appétit
- Cooking Light
- Cook's Illustrated
- Fine Cooking
- Food & Wine
- Food Network Magazine
- Gourmet
- Lucky Peach
- Meatpaper
- Saveur
- Taste of Home
- Vegetarian Times
- Zymurgy

== Gay interest ==
- The Advocate
- Curve
- Genre
- Girlfriends (defunct)
- GO (formerly GO NYC)
- Hello Mr.
- Instinct
- MetroSource
- Out
- Out Traveler (defunct)
- XY (defunct)

== General interest ==
- The Believer
- Collier's (defunct)
- Coronet (defunct)
- The Drift (magazine)
- Good
- Harper's Magazine
- Interview
- Latterly (defunct)
- The Liberator Magazine
- Life
- McClure's (defunct)
- McSweeney's
- National Geographic
- New York Magazine
- The New York Review of Books
- The New Yorker
- Nuestro
- People
- Print
- Reader's Digest
- The Saturday Evening Post
- Smithsonian
- Vanity Fair
- Vanity Fair (1913–1936)

== Gossip ==
- In Touch Weekly
- Life & Style Weekly
- National Enquirer
- OK!
- Star
- Us Weekly

== Health ==
=== Men ===
- Details (defunct)
- Esquire
- GQ
- Men's Fitness
- Men's Health
- Men's Journal

=== Women ===
- Allure
- Cosmopolitan
- Elle
- Fitness
- Glamour
- Health
- InStyle
- Ladies' Home Journal
- Marie Claire
- McCall's (defunct)
- O: The Oprah Magazine
- Redbook
- Self
- Shape
- V
- Vogue
- Woman's Day
- W

=== General ===
- Prevention

== Hispanic community ==
- El Nuevo Cojo Ilustrado (online, print: 2003-2005)
- Two Mundos Magazine (2003)

== History ==
- America's Civil War
- American Heritage
- American Heritage of Invention & Technology
- American History
- Armchair General
- Civil War Times
- Invention & Technology
- Military Heritage
- Military History
- Naval History
- Old News
- Quest: The History of Spaceflight
- True West

== Hobby and interest ==
- Airliners
- Autograph Collector Magazine
- Backpacker
- Birds & Blooms
- Card Player
- Cigar Aficionado
- Kitelife
- Lapidary Journal Jewelry Artist
- Make Magazine
- Model Aviation
- Model Railroader
- Railroad Model Craftsman (formerly known as Model Craftsman)
- Scrye
- Sports Collectors Digest
- Tall Timber Short Lines
- ToyFare (defunct)
- Trains
- Wizard (defunct)

=== Home and garden ===
- Architectural Digest
- Better Homes and Gardens
- Dwell
- The Family Handyman
- House Beautiful
- Fine Gardening

=== Amateur radio ===
- CQ Amateur Radio
- National Contest Journal
- QEX
- QST

=== Animals and pets ===
- Aquarium Fish International (defunct)
- Backyard Poultry
- Bird Talk (defunct)
- Freshwater and Marine Aquarium (defunct)
- Horse & Rider
- Reptiles
- Tropical Fish Hobbyist

=== Board games ===
- American Chess Magazine
- Ares (defunct)
- Chess Life
- Fire & Movement (defunct)
- Games (defunct)
- The General (defunct)
- Knucklebones (defunct)
- Moves (defunct)
- Strategy & Tactics

=== Numismatics/Coin Collecting ===
- Journal of the Barber Coin Collectors' Society
- Civil War Era Numismatics
- COINage
- Coins (defunct)
- Coin World
- Numismatic News
- Numismatic Scrapbook Magazine (defunct)
- The Numismatist
- Penny-Wise
- TEC News
- TAMS Journal

=== Stamp collecting ===
- The American Philatelist

=== Tabletop roleplaying games ===
- Dragon (defunct)
- Dungeon (defunct)
- The Excellent Prismatic Spray (defunct)
- Pyramid (defunct)
- Warpstone (defunct)

== Humor ==
- Bananas (defunct)
- College Humor (defunct)
- Cracked (defunct)
- Crazy (defunct)
- Fusion (defunct)
- Harvard Lampoon
- Help! (defunct)
- Humbug (defunct)
- Mad
- National Lampoon (defunct)
- Plop! (defunct)
- Radar
- Sick (defunct)
- Stanford Chaparral
- Trump (defunct)
- The Wittenburg Door (defunct)

== Jewish community ==
- Heeb (online, print: 2001-2010, teenagers)
- Jewish Currents (left, 1947, n/a)
- Lilith (feminist, 1976, n/a)
- Moment (general interest, 1975, n/a)
- Tikkun (left, 1971, 20,000)

== Lifestyle ==
- Cigar Aficionado
- Cottages & Bungalows
- Country Living
- Departures
- Domino
- Ebony
- Essence
- GRIT Magazine
- Hello Mr.
- Inked
- Jet
- Jetset Magazine
- Kingdom (2003)
- Lucky
- Martha Stewart Living
- MaryJanesFarm
- Mi Gente Hispana Magazine
- Mother Earth News
- O: The Oprah Magazine
- Paper
- Playboy
- Real Simple
- Robb Report
- Southern Living
- Sunset
- Swindle
- Wine Enthusiast (1979; 317,187)
- Wine Spectator
- Y'all

== Literary ==
- Arts & Letters
- Bookmarks
- Heavy Traffic
- Space and Time
- The Midland (defunct)

== Music ==
- Alternative Press
- Bass Player
- Beyond Race Magazine
- Billboard
- Blender (defunct)
- CCM Magazine
- Decibel
- Dirty Linen (defunct)
- Down Beat
- Drum!
- The Fader
- Filter (defunct)
- Flux (defunct)
- Global Rhythm (defunct)
- Goldmine
- Guitar Player
- Guitar World
- Hit Parader (defunct)
- HM
- Keyboard
- Living Blues
- Maximum RocknRoll
- Modern Drummer
- Paste
- Pulse! (defunct)
- Punk Planet (defunct)
- Revolver
- Rolling Stone
- Sentimentalist Magazine (defunct)
- Sing Out! (defunct)
- The Source
- Spin
- TeRra Magazine
- Trouser Press (defunct)
- Vibe
- WESU Magazine
- Who Put the Bomp (defunct)
- XLR8R
- XXL

== News ==
- The Christian Science Monitor
- National Journal
- Newsweek
- Time
- U.S. News & World Report
- The Week
- World

== Pharmaceuticals and pharmacies ==
- Spectroscopy (1985)

== Politics ==
- The American Conservative (right)
- The American Interest
- The American Prospect (liberal, 1990, 100,000)
- The American Spectator (conservative, 1967, 50,000)
- The Atlantic (liberal, 1857, n/a)
- The Brown Spectator (conservative and libertarian, founded 2002, n/a)
- Campaigns & Elections (non-partisan, 1980)
- Commentary (neoconservative, 1945, 25,000)
- Commonweal (liberal Catholic, founded 1924, 20,000)
- Democracy (progressive/liberal, 2006, n/a)
- First Things (Christian conservative, 1990, n/a)
- Foreign Affairs (statist, 1922, 181,519)
- Foreign Policy (1970, 101,054)
- The Freeman (libertarian, 1946, defunct)
- Harper's Magazine (liberal, 1850, 220,000)
- Human Events (conservative, 1944, 75,000)
- Human Rights Quarterly (liberal, 1979, 1,533)
- The Imaginative Conservative (conservative, 2010, n/a)
- In These Times (liberal, 1976, 20,000)
- Jacobin (democratic socialist, 2011, 15,000)
- Jewish Currents (Jewish left, 1947, n/a)
- Liberation (pacifist, 1956, n/a)
- Liberty (libertarian, 1987, n/a)
- Lilith (Jewish feminist, 1976, n/a)
- Lumpen (arts, 1991, n/a)
- Moment (Jewish-diverse, 1975, n/a)
- Monthly Review (socialist, 1949, 8,500)
- Mother Jones (left, 1976, 201,233)
- Multinational Monitor (liberal, 1980, n/a )
- The Nation (left, 1865, 139,612)
- National Review (conservative, 1955, 162,091)
- The New Republic (center-left, 1914, 90,826)
- New York (liberal, 1968, 406,237)
- The New York Review of Books (liberal-left, 1963, 140,000)
- The New Yorker (liberal and non-partisan, 1925, 1,062,310)
- Policy Review (center-right, 2001, 6,000)
- The Progressive (left, 1909, 68,000)
- The Progressive Populist (liberal, 1995, 20,000)
- Reason (libertarian, 1968, 52,000)
- Sojourners (Christian, 1971, n/a)
- Tikkun (Jewish-left, 1971, 20,000)
- Utne Reader (liberal, 1984, n/a)
- Washington Examiner (conservative, 2005, 68,650)
- Washington Monthly (center-left, 1969, 18,000)
- YaleGlobal Online (international, globalization and anti-globalization, 2002, n/a)
- Z Magazine (left, 1987, 20,000)

== Regional interest ==
- 5280 (1993, monthly, Denver)
- 7x7 (1993, online, print: 2001-2015, Central and Southern California)
- Alaska (1935, 10/y, Alaska/living)
- Arizona Highways (1921-1922, 1925; monthly; Arizona/tourism)
- Atlanta (1961, monthly, Atlanta)
- Baltimore (1997, monthly, Baltimore)
- Boston (1962; 55,000; monthly, Greater Boston)
- The Boulevard (1985-2011, 2016; quarterly; Long Island, New York City; variety)
- Chesapeake Bay (1971, monthly, Chesapeake Bay/sailing)
- Chicago (1952; monthly; 98,306; Chicago/lifestyle)
- Cincinnati (1967, monthly, Cincinnati/lifestyle)
- Cleveland Magazine (1972, monthly, Northeastern Ohio)
- Columbus Monthly (1975, monthly, Central Ohio)
- Contempo Magazine (2008, bi-monthly, South Texas)
- D Magazine (1974, monthly, Dallas-Fort Worth)
- Down East (1954; monthly; 90,000; Maine)
- Florida Trend (1958; monthly; 235,000; Florida/business, finance)
- Garden & Gun (2007, bi-monthly, South)
- Georgia Trend (1985; monthly; 50,000; Florida/business, finance)
- Gold Coast (1965, 9/y, Fort Lauderdale/luxury)
- Grand Rapids Magazine (1964; monthly; Grand Rapids, Michigan)
- Honolulu (1888, monthly, Hawaii)
- Hour Detroit (1996, Detroit)
- Houstonia (2013; bi-monthly; 70,000; Greater Houston)
- Hudson Valley (1971; monthly; 150,000, upstate New York)
- Indianapolis Monthly (1977; 41,000; Indianapolis)
- Island Sports Media (2009?, Hawaii/sport)
- Los Angeles (1960, southern California)
- Midwest Living (1986; 800,792; Illinois, Indiana, Iowa, Kansas, Michigan, Minnesota, Missouri, Nebraska, North Dakota, Ohio, South Dakota and Wisconsin)
- Milwaukee Magazine (1983; monthly; 200,000; Milwaukee)
- Minnesota Monthly (1967, Minnesota)
- New Hampshire (1988, monthly, New Hampshire)
- New Mexico Magazine (1923, New Mexico/tourism)
- New York (1968; 439,135; New York City)
- Orange Coast (1974; Orange County, California)
- Our State (1933, North Carolina/pictographic)
- Philadelphia (1908, Philadelphia)
- Raleigh Magazine (2015; Raleigh, North Carolina)
- Sactown Magazine (2006, Sacramento/culture)
- Texas Highways (1974, Texas/tourism)
- Texas Monthly (1973; 252,469; Texas)
- Washingtonian (1965, Washington DC)
- Westchester Magazine (2001; monthly; 67,000; Westchester county, New York)
- Yankee (1935; 233,854; New England)

== Religion ==
- Adventist Review (1849, adventist)
- Adventist World (adventist)
- America (1909; 45,000; catholic jesuit)
- Awake! (1919; 12,787,000; Jehovah's Witnesses)
- Back to Godhead (imported from India, no US edition)
- Beyond Today (1995; 450,000; United Church of God)
- Brio (1990-2009, 2017; evangelical teenagers)
- The Christadelphian Tidings of the Kingdom of God (1939, christadelphian)
- The Christian Century (1884; 36,000; mainstream protenstantism)
- Christian Science Sentinel (1898; Church of Christ, Scientist)
- Christianity Today (1956; 130,000; evangelical)
- Commonweal (1924; 20,000; catholic)
- Family Life (imported from Canada, Amish)
- The Friend (1902, mormon children)
- Gospel Advocate (1855, Churches of Christ)
- Guide (1953; 30,000; adventist)
- Guideposts (1945, undefined christian)
- Herald (1860, mormon)
- Hinduism Today (1979; 18,000; hindu)
- The Humanist (1928-1940, 1941; secular)
- The Lamp (2020, catholic)
- Latin Mass Magazine (1992, catholic)
- Liahona (1995, mormon)
- Liberty (1906; 199,000; adventist)
- The Living Church (1878, anglican)
- Parabola (1976, general mythology)
- St. Anthony Messenger (1893, catholic)
- Signs of the Times (US edition, 1874, adventist)
- Sojourners (1971, evangelical)
- Tricycle: The Buddhist Review (1991, buddhist)
- The Watchtower (1879; 21,700,000; Jehovah's Witnesses)

== Science and technology ==
- Aeon (online, 2012, from Australia)
- American Scientist (1913)
- Archaeology (1948; 160,906; history)
- Astronomy (1973, astronomy)
- Chemical & Engineering News (1923)
- Discover (1980, mass readers)
- Flying (1927, aeronautics)
- Infinite Energy (1994; 3,000; recent developments)
- The Mineralogical Record
- National Geographic (1888; 1,980,103)
- Natural History (1900)
- Nature (US edition of a magazine from the UK, where was founded in 1869)
- Nautilus (2013)
- New Scientist (US edition of a magazine from the UK, where was founded in 1956)
- Popular Mechanics (1902; 401,507; mass readers)
- Popular Science (online, print: 1872-2021, mass readers)
- Quanta Magazine (2012, recent developments)
- Rock & Gem
- Science News (1922; 107,166; recent developments)
- Scientific American (1845)
- The Scientist (1986, professional)
- Skeptic (1992; 40,000; fact-checking)
- Skeptical Inquirer (1976, fact-checking)
- Sky & Telescope (1941, astronomy)
- TeRra Magazine (2017, English language magazine imported from South Korea where was founded in 2016)
- Weatherwise (1947, meteorology, climate)

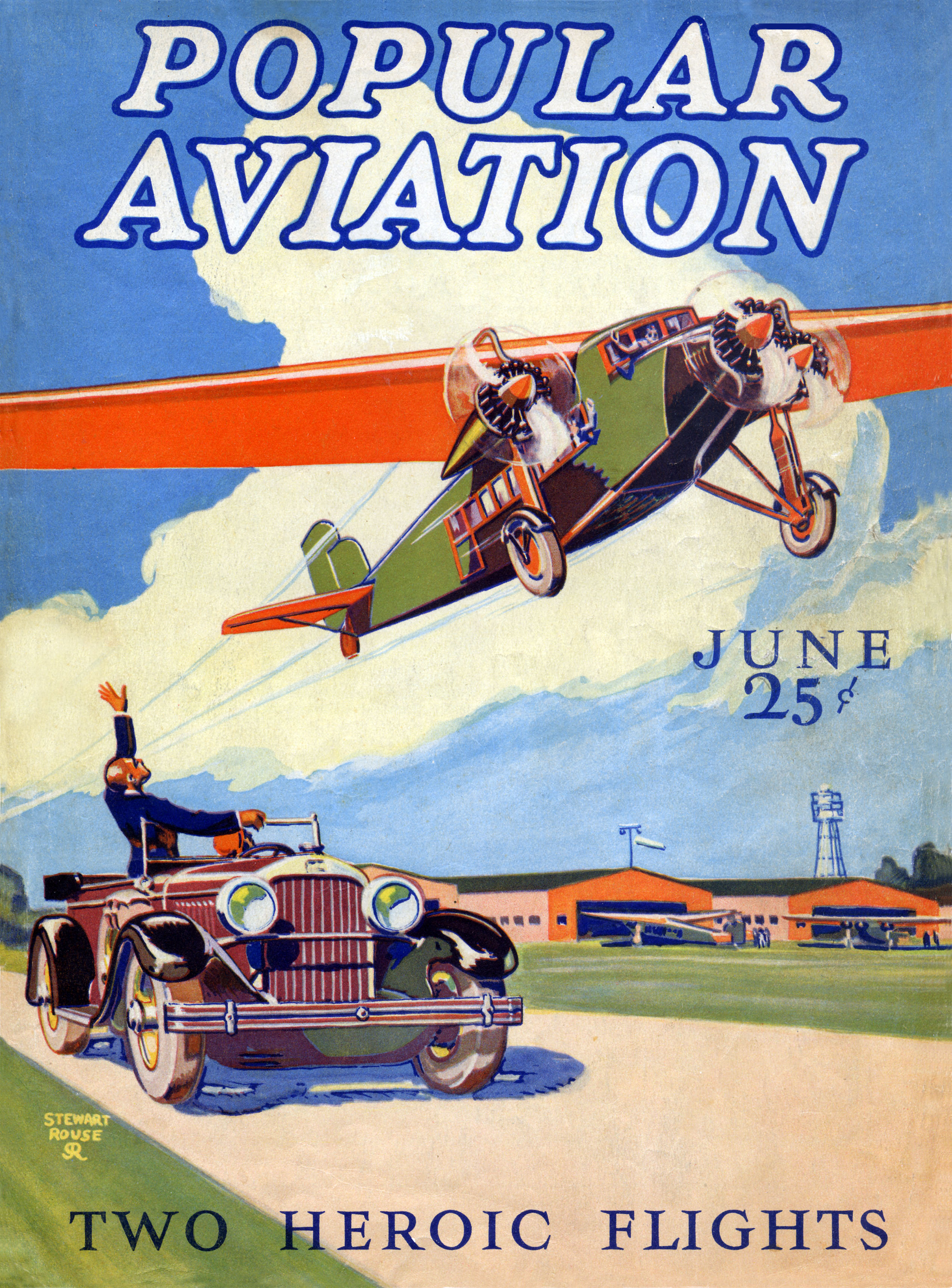
1928 issue of Popular Aviation (now published as Flying), which became the largest aviation magazine with a circulation of 100,000 in 1929.

== Science fiction and fantasy ==
- Amazing Stories (1926-2005, 2012)
- Analog Science Fiction and Fact (1930)
- Apex Digest (2005-2019, 2020)
- Asimov's Science Fiction (1977)
- Doctor Who Magazine (1979, imported from the UK)
- Fantasy and Science Fiction (1949)
- Heavy Metal (online, print: 1977-2023)
- Locus (1968)
- Star Wars Insider (1987)

== Sports ==
- American Cheerleader (1995, cheerleading, sport dancing)
- Athletics Weekly (1945, general athletics)
- Athlon Sports (online, print: 1967-2022)
- Baseball Digest (1942, baseball)
- Bicycling (1961, cycling)
- Dime Magazine (2001, basketball)
- Field & Stream (1895-2020, 2024; fishing, hunting)
- Fly Tyer (1978-1982?, 1995; fishing)
- Frequency: The Snowboarder's Journal (2001, snowboarding)
- Golf Digest (1950; 1,652,356; golf)
- Golf Magazine (1959; 1,214,364; golf)
- Gray's Sporting Journal (1975; hunting, fishing)
- Island Sports Media (2009?, Hawaii-focused)
- Lindy's Sports (1982)
- Marlin (1981/2, fishing)
- Outdoor Life (1898; outdoor)
- Pro Football Weekly (1967, football)
- Pro Wrestling Illustrated (1979, wrestling)
- The Ring (online, print: 1922-2022, boxing)
- Runner's World (1966; 1,600,000; running)
- Salt Water Sportsman (1939, fishing)
- SLAM Magazine (1994; 70,000; basketball)
- Snowboard Magazine (online, print: 2004-2016, snowboarding)
- Soccer America (1971, soccer)
- Sporting News (online, print: 1886-2012)
- Sports Afield (1887, outdoor)
- Sports Illustrated (1954; 470,152)
- Sports Illustrated Kids (1989; 107,202; children, teens)
- Tae Kwon Do Times (1980, martial arts)
- Tennis (1965, tennis)
- Track & Field News (1954-2018, 2019; general athletics)
- Western Horseman (1936, horseback riding)
- WWE Magazine (online, print: 1983-2014, wrestling)

== Teen interest ==
- American Cheerleader (1995, cheerleading, sport dancing)
- Brio (1990-2009, 2017; evangelical)
- Cricket (1973, pre-teens)
- Girls' Life (1994, girls)
- Heeb (online, print: 2001-2010, jewish)
- J-14 (online, print: 1999-2024, girls)
- Logan (2006, disabled)
- niNe. magazine (online, print: 2006-2011 or 2015, girls)
- Otaku USA (2007, anime, manga)
- Popstar! (1998, entertainment)
- Popteen (online US edition of a magazine from Japan, girls, fashion)
- Right On! (online, print discontinued in 2014, black)
- Scout Life (1911, scouts)
- Seventeen (1944, only special standalone issues since 2018, girls)
- Shojo Beat (online, print: 2005-2009, manga)
- Sports Illustrated Kids (1989; 107,202; sport)
- Teen Ink (1989)
- Teen Vogue (online, print: 2003-2017, girls, fashion)

=== Imported (no US edition) ===
- 20 Ans (France)
- Bis (Japan)
- Bravo (Germany)
- Expreszo (Netherlands)
- Faze (Canada)
- Girlfriend (Australia)
- Kishor Alo (Bangladesh)
- Nicola (Japan)
- Ranzuki (Japan)
- Teen Now (UK)
- Teenage Survival Handbook (Canada)
- Unish-Kuri (India)
- Vivi (Japan)
- Wave (Nepal)

== Travel ==
- AAA Home and Away
- AAA Living
- AAA Via
- AAA World
- Alaska Beyond Magazine (online; print: 19??-2022; inflight)
- Arizona Highways (1921-1922, 1925; Arizona-focused)
- Condé Nast Traveler (1987; 712,343)
- Delta Sky Magazine (inflight)
- Hemispheres (online; print: 1992-2024; inflight)
- National Geographic Traveler (online, US edition print: 1984-2019)
- New Mexico Magazine (1923, New Mexico-focused)
- Southwest: The Magazine (inflight)
- Texas Highways (1974, Texas-focused)
- Travel and Leisure (1937, 955,897)

== Video games ==
- Electronic Gaming Monthly (online, print: 1989-2014)
- Game Informer (online, print: 1991-2024)
- Nintendo Force (2013)
- PC Gamer (1994, US edition of a magazine from the UK launched in 1993)

== Writing ==
- The Writer (1887, monthly)
- Writer's Digest (1920, 8/y)

== Miscellaneous ==
- Fidelio (1992, quarterly)
- High Times (1974, monthly)
- Mental Floss (online, print: 2001-2016)
- UFO Magazine (online, print: 1986-2012)
- Civilization (2018, print)

== See also ==
- List of journals (disambiguation)
- List of defunct American magazines
- List of United States magazines with online archives
- Lists of magazines
- List of magazines by circulation
- Media of the United States
- List of sports magazines
