= List of teen magazines =

This is a list of teen magazines.

== Magazines ==
- 16 (magazine)
- 20 Ans
- American Cheerleader
- Annida (discontinued)
- Bananas (discontinued)
- Bis
- Bliss (discontinued)
- Bop
- Boys' Life
- Bravo (Germany)
- Brio
- Cicada
- The Contributor
- Cosmogirl (discontinued)
- Cricket
- Dolly
- Dynamite (discontinued)
- Elle Girl (discontinued)
- Enter (discontinued)
- Expreszo
- Faze
- Frida
- Gadis (Indonesia)
- Girlfriend
- Girls' Life
- Hai (Indonesia)
- Imagine
- J-14
- Jam
- Jump
- JVibe
- K-Zone
- Kishor Alo
- Kishore Bangla
- KISS
- Logan
- M Magazine (discontinued)
- Mad About Boys
- MensEGG
- MH-18
- Muslim Girl
- Muslimah (Indonesia)
- New Era
- New Moon (magazine)
- Nicola
- niNe. magazine
- Otaku USA
- Petticoat
- Płomyk
- Popteen
- Pravda
- Ranzuki
- Right On!
- Sassy
- Seventeen
- Shameless
- Shojo Beat
- Shout
- Sisters
- Smile
- Sports Illustrated Kids
- Teen (discontinued)
- Teenage Survival Handbook
- Teen Beat
- Teen Ink
- Teen Now (UK)
- Teen People
- TeenSet
- Teen Vogue
- Teen Voices
- Tiger Beat (discontinued)
- Twist
- Unish-Kuri
- Vervegirl
- Vivi
- ’Xceptional Teen Magazine
- Wave
- Yes!
- YGA
- YM (discontinued)
- Young Woman's Journal

== See also ==
- Teen magazine
- Lists of magazines
