= American Angler =

Fly fishing magazine

American Angler magazine's January/February 2007 cover.

American Angler was a magazine dedicated to the subject of fly fishing, with an emphasis on cold water fisheries, published six times a year. It billed itself as a "how to, where to" magazine focusing on technical fly-fishing informational articles and explorations of new fishing locations. It is an asset of Morris Communications, which also owns publications such as Gray's Sporting Journal, Fly Tyer, and the also defunct Saltwater Fly Fishing. Collectively, these magazines are referred to as the "Morris Group." American Angler was the third-largest fly-fishing magazine in terms of circulation, with approximately 40,000 subscribers, following Fly Fisherman and Fly Rod and Reel. It was the only magazine among those to use "perfect binding" instead of stapled pages.

== Notable Authors ==
Macauley Lord, author of the L.L. Bean Fly-Casting Handbook, was the regular casting columnist.

Phil Monahan was the former editor of American Angler magazine, as well as a feature-articles author and the past editorial director of the Morris Group of fly-fishing magazines.

Ed Engle, author of Splitting Cane, was a frequent contributor.

William "Bill" Tapply, author of the Brady Coyne mystery novels, wrote the final column in each issue.

Dave Klausmeyer, editor of Fly Tyer, contributed the Tyer's Notes column in each issue.

== Regular Features ==
American Angler had a number of regular columns.

"The Rant" was a reader-contributed column intended to give readers the chance to get something related to fly fishing off their chest. Past subjects included pegged beads (a controversial form of salmon fishing), as well as conservation issues.

"Natural Reflections," an insect photography column written by Ted Fauceglia, features a different photo of a fly fishing related insect each issue.

"Headwaters" (formerly "FYI") was a news and information column.

"Expeditions" was a regular feature-article section highlighting longer trips, often to exotic locales.

"Casting" featured Macauley Lord discussing techniques and improvements to the art of fly casting, written for a beginning to intermediate audience.

"Quick Fly" described the method of tying a different fly with each issue, and was usually published in collaboration with sister-publication Fly Tyer, edited by author Dave Klausmeyer.

"Gear I Love" was another reader-penned article highlighting a favorite piece of fly fishing gear.

== History ==
American Angler began as Fly Tyer, an in-house publication of the Dick Surette Fly Fishing Shop in North Conway, New Hampshire. The first issue was published in 1978. During the 1980s, following declining interest in fly fishing, Fly Tyer was sold and underwent several name changes. It became American Fly Tyer, then American Angler & Fly Tyer, and finally American Angler. In 1990, under more successful business management, the magazine increased to a bimonthly (six issues a year) printing schedule.

"Why American Angler? [Then-owner] Dick Stewart explained that he wanted a name that would stand out from the other fly-fishing periodicals. More important, the surveys he conducted told him that the magazine’s readers wanted practical information that they could use on their home waters. Stewart chose a title that reflected a commitment to the average American fly fisher."

In 1992, American Angler changed hands and became the flagship publication of Abenaki Publishers, which moved the magazine to Bennington, Vermont. The year 1992 also saw the debut of Robert Redford's A River Runs Through It, with a corresponding boom in national attention paid to fly fishing. In 1995, then-editor Art Scheck re-launched Fly Tyer and moved with it, while Dave Klausmeyer (current editor of Fly Tyer) joined as an associate editor.

By 1999, Phil Monahan took over as editor of American Angler and the magazine changed hands once again, to become a part of the Morris Group.

"In a memorial piece written for Fly Tyer, Dick Stewart described Dick Surette, the founding publisher, as 'democratic to a fault, publishing articles submitted by professional and amateur alike.' That approach set the tone. While American Angler has published the work of the sport’s best-known writers, it has always been open to new voices and new ideas."

American Angler ended publication in 2020. Their website indicates the final issue was May/June 2020.

== News ==
According to their publishers, American Angler and Saltwater Fly Fishing merged into a single magazine in December 2007. American Angler was expected to have an increased page count, while subscribers of Saltwater Fly Fishing had their subscriptions transferred to the new joint publication, which continued to be titled American Angler, but had a standalone saltwater section.

Additionally, Saltwater Fly Fishing editor Steve Walburn announced the purchase of www.saltwaterflyfishing.com, where back issue content will be hosted.

== Reader Contributions ==
American Angler was one of the few major fly fishing publications that regularly accepted and published reader contributions, in the "Gear I Love" and "The Rant" columns.

== Official website ==
- American Angler Magazine Online, featuring a discussion board as well as continuing content from the magazine.

== Recommended links ==
=== Interviews ===
- "Dynamiting Beavers with Phil Monahan", a podcast interview with American Angler editor Phil Monahan.

=== Websites ===
- SaltwaterFlyFishing.com, the official new site of Saltwater Fly Fishing and the place to find back issue content following the recently announced merger.
- The Itinerant Angler, fly fishing podcasts, photoblog, and online community, also including articles reprinted from American Angler.
- MidCurrent Flyfishing, a daily blog for dedicated trout anglers, also featuring articles reprinted from American Angler.
