= Sara Shamma =

Syrian painter (born 1975)

Sara Shamma سارة شمّة
- 2005 self-portrait, oil on canvas, 120×120 cm
- Born: November 26, 1975 (age 50); Damascus, Syria
- Education: Faculty of fine arts Damascus University Damascus, Syria
- Known for: Painting
- Movement: Surrealism, Hyperrealism, Figurative
- Website: sarashamma.com

Sara Shamma (Arabic: سارة شمّة) (born 26 November 1975) is a Syrian artist based between Damascus and London, whose painterly works are executed in a figurative mode. She represents Syria at the 61st Venice Biennale in 2026, thereby becoming the first Syrian artist to present a solo exhibition at the event. Storytelling and narrative are of paramount importance in her work. Shamma has long been preoccupied with the psychology of individual suffering and has produced work on war, modern slavery and human trafficking. Her oeuvre may be divided into series that reflect sustained periods of research.

== Early life and education ==
Shamma was born on 26 November 1975 in Damascus, Syria, to a Syrian father and a Lebanese mother. Her father was a civil engineer, and her mother, who had studied sociology and child psychology, later opened the Iris Art Gallery in Damascus. Shamma's artistic talent was evident from a very young age, and by the age of four she was already painting, a passion her parents actively nurtured. From 1982 to 1985, she attended children's drawing classes at the Adham Isma'il Fine Arts Institute in Damascus, from which she later graduated in 1995.

She went on to enroll in the Painting Department of the Faculty of Fine Arts at the University of Damascus, where she graduated first in her class in 1998. While Shamma found the academic course uninspiring, it gave her the time to develop her own distinctive style and technique. Crucially, during her third year at university, her mother opened an art gallery in Damascus. Shamma did a large graduation show at the university of fine arts in 1998. This show is widely credited with helping to establish her name on the Syrian art scene.

During her university years, Shamma regularly visited a reconstructed Palmyra funerary tomb in the basement of the National Museum of Damascus, drawing studies of the funerary reliefs. This early encounter with ancient portraiture and the concept of memorialising the dead would resurface decades later as the central theme for her exhibition at the 2026 Venice Biennale.

After graduating, Shamma began her career as an educator, teaching at the Adham Ismail Fine Arts Institute in Damascus from 1997 to 2000. This period of teaching coincided with her emergence as a practising artist, leading to her first major international recognition a few years later.

From her early youth, Shamma was drawn to the psychological depth of portraiture. She has cited Rembrandt as her earliest and most significant influence, while also being profoundly affected by the surrealist universe of Salvador Dalí, whose work she discovered around the age of thirteen. Shamma has connected Dalí's approach to her own interest in the subconscious, viewing the act of painting as an intuitive, dreamlike process; she has often stated that she begins a work without a predetermined outcome, a methodology she has likened to dreaming.

== Professional career ==
Shamma's international breakthrough came in 2004 when she was awarded fourth prize in the prestigious BP Portrait Award at the National Portrait Gallery in London for a realistic self-portrait, which brought her significant international attention. This led to numerous international exhibitions, including NordArt in Büdelsdorf, Germany (2012), and in 2013, a solo show titled Q at the Royal College of Art and the Royal Society of Portrait Painters' Annual Exhibition at the Mall Galleries, both in London. In 2010, she was appointed a 'Celebrity Partner' artist for the United Nations World Food Programme (WFP), producing a large-scale painting that was later auctioned at Christie's Dubai to benefit the organisation.

=== Displacement and move to London ===
The outbreak of the Syrian civil war profoundly disrupted Shamma's life. In late 2012, after a car bomb exploded near her home in Damascus while she was alone with her two young children, she made the decision to leave the country. She first relocated with her children to her mother's hometown in northern Lebanon, while her husband remained in Syria for his business, visiting on weekends. This separation took a toll, and in 2016, the entire family moved to London after Shamma was granted a UK Exceptional Talent Visa. From then on, she maintained studios in both London and Damascus, making regular trips back to Syria to work. She returned to live in Damascus permanently in late 2024, just months before the fall of the Assad regime.

=== Projects in the United Kingdom ===
In 2019, Shamma was appointed a King's Artist in Residence at King's College London. Working in collaboration with the Institute of Psychiatry, Psychology & Neuroscience (IoPPN) and the Helen Bamber Foundation, she conducted interviews with survivors of modern slavery and human trafficking, an experience she described as emotionally harrowing. The resulting body of work, the Modern Slavery series, aimed to visually translate their psychological trauma and was first exhibited at Bush House, London, before embarking on a multi-venue tour of UK cathedrals that continued until the end of 2021. Continuing her academic engagement, from 2020 to 2023, she served on the Legacies of Empire & Enslavement Advisory Group at the University of Cambridge Museums.

== Venice Biennale 2026: The Tower Tomb of Palmyra ==
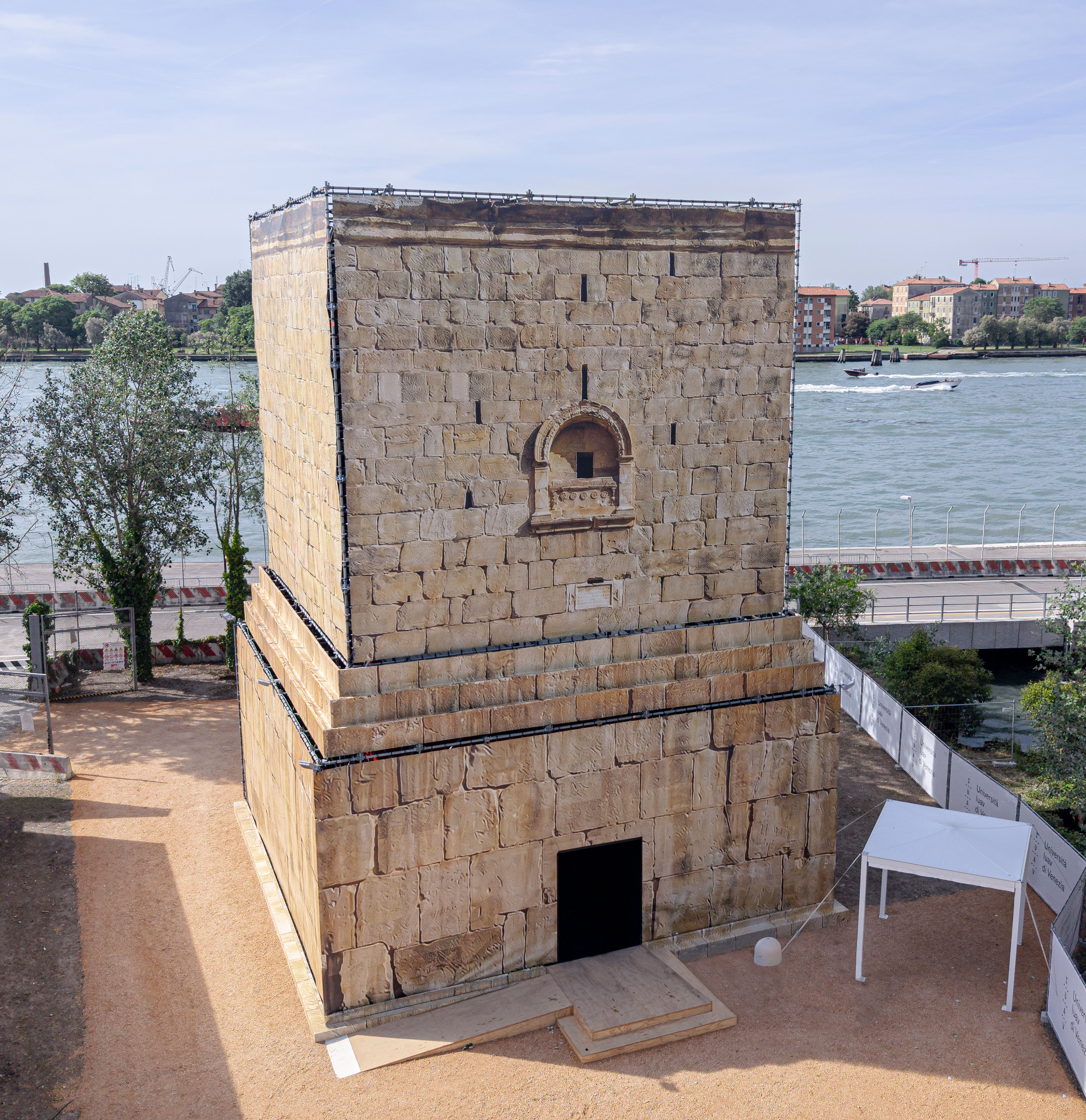
The Tower Tomb of Palmyra

Shamma's presentation for the Syrian Pavilion at the 61st Venice Biennale (from 9 May to 22 November 2026) is titled The Tower Tomb of Palmyra. Curated by Yuko Hasegawa, the former director of the 21st Century Museum of Contemporary Art in Kanazawa, Japan, the exhibition constitutes a solo presentation, a departure from Syria's previous group shows. The pavilion is housed in the open-air courtyard of the Università Iuav di Venezia's Cotonificio campus.

Shamma's project draws its inspiration from the ancient funerary towers of Palmyra, multistorey monuments built between the 1st century BCE and 3rd century CE to house extended families. The artist's fascination with the site began during her university years in Damascus, where she would regularly visit a recreated Palmyra tomb at the National Museum of Damascus. The underground installation, constructed from a mix of original fragments and reconstructed pieces, features rows of burial niches sealed with sculpted portraits of the dead, an approach Shamma describes as "almost like a form of portraiture in Syria." She spent hours there drawing and painting these funerary portraits, an experience that profoundly shaped the conception of her Venice installation decades later.

The installation takes the form of 15-metre-high tower, inside it a nine-sided chamber, with two rows of large-scale paintings rising four metres around visitors. Creating an immersive, multisensory environment, Shamma collaborated with local perfumers in the Damascus souq to develop bespoke scents from herbs and plants native to the Syrian desert. The installation also incorporates a soundscape featuring field recordings from Palmyra, including the sound of wind and sand, to evoke a direct sensory connection to the site.

The pavilion serves not only as a meditation on cultural loss but also as a direct call for the restitution of antiquities looted during the Syrian conflict. Shamma has linked the destruction of Palmyra to wider cultural erasure in the region, stating that the exhibition is "not only a reflection on loss, but a message of hope, unity, and the importance of protecting and restoring our shared heritage."

The 2026 pavilion represents a landmark shift in Syria's approach to the Biennale. Departing from previous group presentations, the Ministry of Culture commissioned Shamma for a solo exhibition, a format intended to present a stronger, more unified national narrative on a global stage. The pavilion was described at its opening as Syria’s "first-ever participation at this level" and marks the country's formal return to the international cultural arena following the end of the Syrian civil war in 2024.

== Work ==
=== Style and technique ===
Shamma's paintings are predominantly figurative, yet she frequently combines hyperrealistic detail with abstract passages of thick, richly textured colour. She has described her approach as "not classically figurative; I use figures but also abstraction and a touch of surrealism." Working intuitively and without preparatory sketches, she has likened the act of painting to dreaming, stating that she begins each work with no predetermined outcome, striving for what she terms a "consciously induced subconscious state." Music plays a crucial part in this process, and she works mainly from her own photographs rather than from live models.

A signature technique, applied as a final gesture, involves scoring the finished canvas with a blade-cutter. This creates a sharp, scar-like incision that exposes the raw white cotton beneath, dramatically disrupting the illusionistic surface. Shamma has explained that this line is intended to introduce a new kind of depth, pushing the entire painting backward whilst adding a contrasting, sharp dimension to the composition. Her surrogate human forms, often rendered with exaggerated eyes and bodily gestures, are designed not merely to be observed but to look back at the viewer—a quality that has been compared to the gaze of ancient Sumerian temple figurines.

Critics have noted that elements of her psychologically intense portraiture share common ground with artists such as Francis Bacon and Lucian Freud. Whilst her work can convey a similar raw emotional intensity, it has been observed that she achieves this "without the edge of cruelty and despair, and with more beauty and hope". Shamma herself has acknowledged being impressed by Bacon and Freud from a young age, but she cites Rembrandt as her earliest and most significant influence, alongside the profound impact of Salvador Dalí's surrealist universe, which she first encountered at around the age of thirteen.

=== Themes and subject matter ===
Shamma's practice is rooted in an exploration of the human condition, encompassing psychology, mortality, motherhood, children's perspectives, and the traumas of war, displacement, and modern slavery. Central to her philosophy is the conviction that "we create because of death. Death is the main trigger to creation." This preoccupation with mortality is channelled through intensely personal subject matter, with self-portraits and depictions of her own children appearing frequently throughout her oeuvre.

The Syrian civil war has had a profound and lasting influence on her approach to the figure. Working primarily from life and her own photographs, Shamma employs oils to build hyper-realistic scenes, within which she deploys transparent lines and suggestions of motion to evoke what she describes as a "distant and deep void". This technique imparts a palpable sense of psychological unease and impermanence to her subjects. Her work is typically organised into meticulously researched series, each of which can extend over several years of sustained investigation.

Shamma's artistic influences are notably wide-ranging and cross-cultural. She has drawn inspiration from both Latin American art and the Sufi tradition of the Whirling Dervishes, the spiritual practice whose sense of ecstatic motion she evokes through the swirling forms and deliberate visual distortion found in many of her paintings. Her visual language is also deeply informed by the ancient cultural heritage of Syria, with frequent references to Mesopotamian and Byzantine art, linking her contemporary practice to a millennia-old regional artistic lineage.

== Major series ==
Shamma's practice is characterised by extended, research-driven projects, often organised into series that unfold over several years. Her most significant bodies of work are detailed below.

=== World Civil War Portraits (2015) ===
A direct artistic response to the Syrian civil war, this series comprises portraits of individuals who were displaced, tortured, or killed during the conflict. First exhibited at The Old Truman Brewery in London, the works sought to restore individuality and humanity to the victims of a war that had, in Shamma's view, transcended national borders to become a global crisis.

=== Modern Slavery (2019–2021) ===
Created during her residency as a King's Artist at King's College London, this series was grounded in first-hand research, developed in collaboration with the university's Institute of Psychiatry, Psychology & Neuroscience (IoPPN) and the Helen Bamber Foundation. The paintings were informed by interviews Shamma conducted with survivors of modern slavery and human trafficking, a process she found deeply affecting. She later recalled, "The first interview was emotionally disturbing, I couldn't sleep. I was imagining pictures, noises, men, it was very bad." The series premiered at Bush House, King's College London, before embarking on a nationwide tour of several UK cathedrals, concluding in 2021.

=== Bold Spirits (2023–2024) ===
A landmark solo exhibition at the Dulwich Picture Gallery in London, which represented the first time the historic gallery had dedicated a solo show to an artist of Arab origin. Curated by Helen Hillyard, the exhibition ran from September 2023 to February 2024. For this project, Shamma engaged directly with the gallery's collection of Old Master paintings, creating new works in response to celebrated pieces by Rembrandt, Rubens, Van Dyck, and Lely. She focused her attention on the overlooked and often anonymous female figures within these canonical works, reinterpreting their stories through the prism of her own experience as a mother and an artist. The exhibition was widely praised for giving voice to women whose names had been lost to history.

=== Echoes of 12 Years (2024–2025) ===
A major retrospective survey at the National Museum of Damascus, comprising 27 large-scale works drawn from across the breadth of her career. The exhibition served as a profound meditation on the twelve years of the Syrian civil war and held deep personal significance, marking Shamma's formal artistic return to Damascus after eight years of living and working in London.

=== Interference Green (2025) ===
A solo exhibition held at the Mark Hachem Gallery in Beirut, presenting 20 recent paintings that explored the colour green as both a central subject and a fundamental structural device. The series represented a significant chromatic shift in her palette, which she has described as a natural artistic evolution following an extended period of working predominantly with red.

== Selected exhibitions ==
=== Selected solo exhibitions ===
- 2026 – The Tower Tomb of Palmyra by Sara Shamma, Representing Syria at the Syrian Pavilion, La Biennale di Venezia.
- 2025 – Interference Green, Mark Hachem Gallery, Beirut, Lebanon.
- 2024–2025 – Echoes of 12 Years, National Museum of Damascus, Damascus, Syria.
- 2023–2024 – Bold Spirits, Dulwich Picture Gallery, London, UK.
- 2022 – Age, curated by Fatina Al Sayed, Contemporary Art Platform CAP Kuwait, Kuwait.
- 2019 – Modern Slavery, Bush House, King's College London, London, UK.
- 2017 – London, Art Sawa Gallery, Dubai, UAE.
- 2015 – World Civil War Portraits, The Old Truman Brewery, London, UK.
- 2014 – Diaspora, Art Sawa Gallery, Dubai, UAE.
- 2013 – Q, Royal College of Art, London, UK.
- 2011 – Birth, Art House, Damascus, Syria.
- 2009 – Love, 360 MALL, Kuwait.
- 2008 – Finishing Touch, Knowledge Village, Dubai, UAE.
- 2008 – Sara 1978, Art House, Damascus, Syria.
- 2007 – Music, Cornish Club Event Gallery, Kuwait.
- 2004 – Sara Shamma, Kalemaat Art Gallery, Aleppo and Kuwait.
- 2002 – Sara Shamma, Nassir Choura Art Gallery, Damascus, Syria.
- 2001 – Sara Shamma, Shell Cultural Club, Damascus, Syria.
- 1999 – Sara Shamma, French Cultural Center, Damascus, Syria.

=== Selected group exhibitions ===
- 2025 – Modern and Contemporary Middle Eastern Art, Bonhams, London, UK.
- 2022 – Art for Chance (Children Against Cancer), Mark Hachem Gallery, Paris, France.
- 2022 – From Rome to Ripon exhibition and commission, Ripon Cathedral, Ripon, UK.
- 2022 – The Worldwide Fund for Nature Singapore's AR‑mazing Tiger Trail, curated by Chris Westbrook and auctioned by Sotheby's, Singapore.
- 2021 – Tusk Lion Trail, a high‑profile sculpture trail curated by Chris Westbrook and auctioned by Bonhams, London, UK.
- 2020 – Modern to Contemporary Female Middle Eastern Artist, Mark Hachem Gallery, Beirut, Lebanon.
- 2019 – Middle Eastern, Modern and Contemporary Art, Christie's, London, UK.
- 2019 – Ruth Borchard Self‑Portrait Prize, Piano Nobile, King's Place, London, UK.
- 2019 – Multi‑colour, 9 Cork Street, London, UK.
- 2018 – The Summer Exhibition, Royal Academy of Arts, London, UK.
- 2018 – New Collective Show, Mark Hachem Gallery, Beirut, Lebanon.
- 2015 – Guest artist, 33rd Emirates Fine Arts Society Annual Exhibition, Sharjah Art Museum, Sharjah, UAE.
- 2013 – The Royal Society of Portrait Painters Annual Exhibition, The Mall Galleries, London, UK.
- 2013 – Florence Biennale, Florence, Italy.
- 2012 – Nord Art 2012, organised by KiC – Kunst in der Carlshütte, Büdelsdorf, Germany.
- 2010 – Art Prize 2010, Kendall College of Art and Design, Grand Rapids, Michigan, USA.
- 2010 – Nord Art 2010, organised by KiC – Kunst in der Carlshütte, Büdelsdorf, Germany.
- 2010 – Contemporary Art from the Middle East, Ayyam Gallery, Dubai, UAE.
- 2008/2009 – Damas‑Paris, Regards Croisés, Arab World Institute, Paris, France, and National Museum, Damascus, Syria.
- 2008 – UAE Through Arabian Eyes, International Financial Centre, Dubai, UAE.
- 2008 – Syrian Artists, Souq Wakef Art Center, Doha, Qatar.
- 2008 – The Waterhouse Natural History Art Prize, South Australian Museum, Adelaide, and the National Archives of Australia, Canberra, Australia.
- 2007 – Panorama of Syrian Arts, Catzen Arts Centre at The American University, Washington, D.C., USA.
- 2006 – Syrian Artists, Syrian Cultural Centre, Paris, France.
- 2005–2006 – International Painting Prize of the Castellon County Council, ESPAId, Castellon, and the Municipal Arts Centre of Alcorcon, Madrid, Spain.
- 2005 – Women and Arts, International Vision, Expo Sharjah, Sharjah, UAE.
- 2004–2005 – BP Portrait Award, National Portrait Gallery, London, UK; Royal Albert Memorial Museum, Exeter, UK; Aberdeen Art Gallery, Aberdeen, UK; Royal West of England Academy, Bristol, UK; Aberystwyth Arts Centre, Aberystwyth, UK.
- 2004 – Syrian Artists, National Library, Madrid, Spain.
- 2003 – Festival du Monde Arabe de Montréal, Montréal, Canada.
- 2002 – Syrian Artists, Gallery Amber, Leiden and Enschede, the Netherlands.
- 2002 – International Artists, Gallery M-Art, Vienna, Austria.
- 2002 – Mediterranean Biennial, Kheir El Din Palace, Tunis, Tunisia.
- 2001 – Two Syrian Artists, Coventry Museum, Coventry, UK.
- 2001 – Sharjah Biennial, Sharjah, UAE.
- 2001 – Cairo Biennial, Cairo, Egypt.

== Awards and honours ==
- 2019 – Artist-in-residence, Institute of Psychiatry, Psychology & Neuroscience, King's College London
- 2019 – Shortlisted, Asian Women of Achievement Awards, London
- 2019 – Shortlisted, Ruth Borchard Self-portrait Prize, London
- 2013 – Fourth Prize and Special Mention, Florence Biennale
- 2010 – Shortlisted, NordArt Prize, Annual International Exhibition, Kunst in der Carlshütte, Büdelsdorf, Germany
- 2010 – Celebrity Partner, United Nations World Food Programme
- 2009 – Second Prize in Painting, Art/Literary Competition, Sculptural Pursuit magazine, United States
- 2008 – First Prize, Waterhouse Natural History Art Prize, South Australian Museum, Adelaide, Australia
- 2006 – Fine Arts Syndicate Award, Damascus
- 2006 – Member of the jury, Annual Exhibition for Syrian Artists, Damascus
- 2005 – Shortlisted, International Painting Prize of the Castellón County Council, Castellón, Spain
- 2004 – Fourth Prize, BP Portrait Award, National Portrait Gallery, London, UK
- 2002 – Represented Syria, Mediterranean Biennial, Kheir El Din Palace, Tunis
- 2001 – First Prize (Gold Medal), Latakia Biennial, Syria
- 2000 – Second Prize, Spanish Cultural Center Art Competition, Damascus
- 2000 – Second Prize, British Council Art Competition, Damascus
- 1998 – Second Prize, Youth Exhibition, Damascus

== Publications ==
- Sara Shamma 2000–05, Damascus, 2005
- Sara Shamma 2005–07, Damascus, 2007
- Sara Shamma: Music, Kuwait, 2007
- Sara Shamma, Damascus, 2008
- Sara Shamma: Love, Kuwait, 2009
- Sara Shamma 2009–10, Damascus, 2011
- Sara Shamma: Q, with text by Jessica Lack, Royal College of Art, London, 2013
- Diaspora: Sara Shamma, with text by Edward Lucie-Smith, Art Sawa Gallery, Dubai, 2014
- Sara Shamma, with text by Edward Lucie-Smith and Sacha Craddock, London, 2014
- World Civil War Portraits: Sara Shamma, with text by Sacha Craddock, Old Truman Brewery, London, 2015
- London: Sara Shamma, with text by Charlotte Mullins, Art Sawa Gallery, London, 2017
- London: Sara Shamma, with text by Charlotte Mullins, London, 2018
- Sara Shamma: Modern Slavery, with text by Kathleen Soriano and Dr Sian Oram, King's College London, London, 2019

== Gallery ==
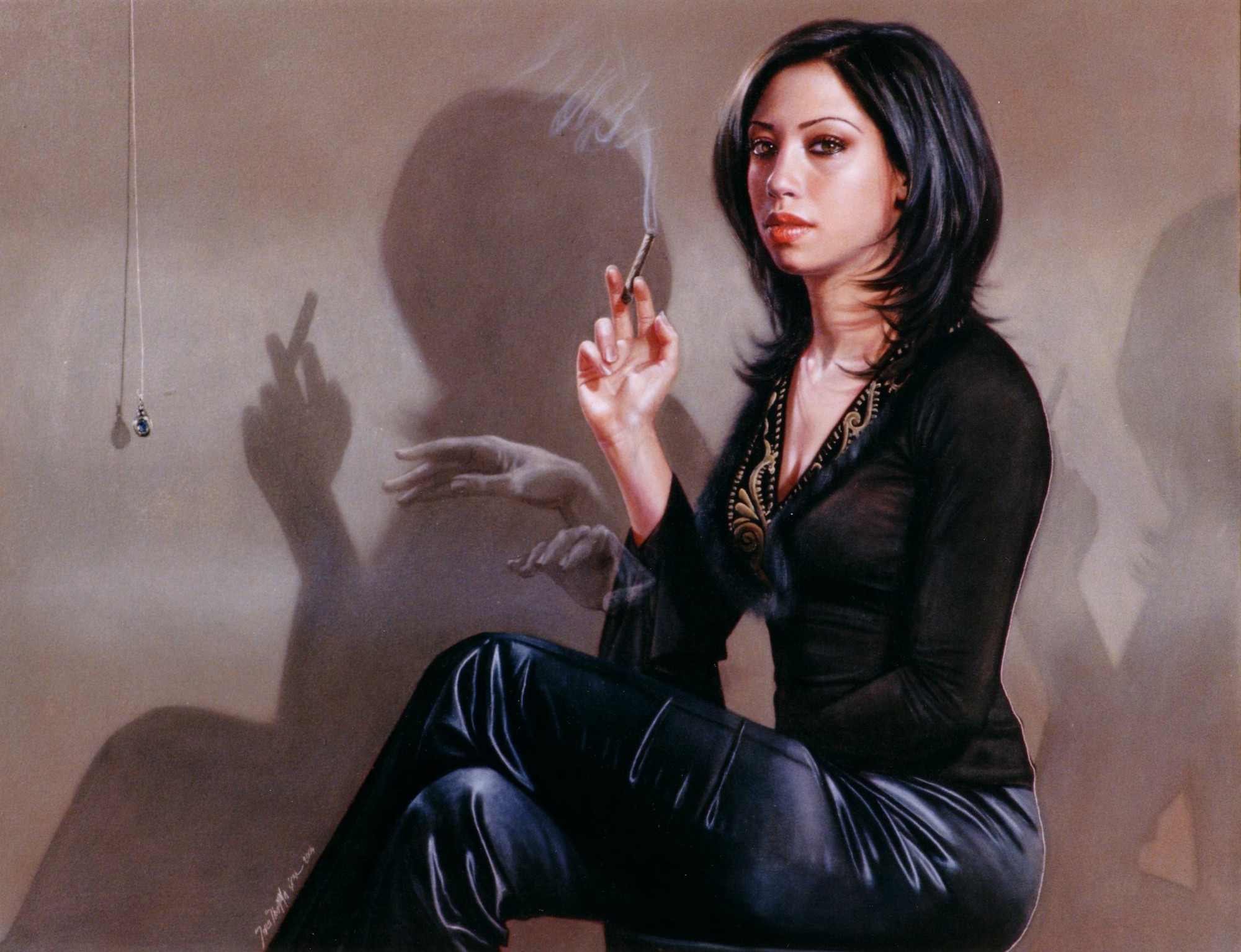
Self‑portrait (2004), oil on canvas, 145×115 cm

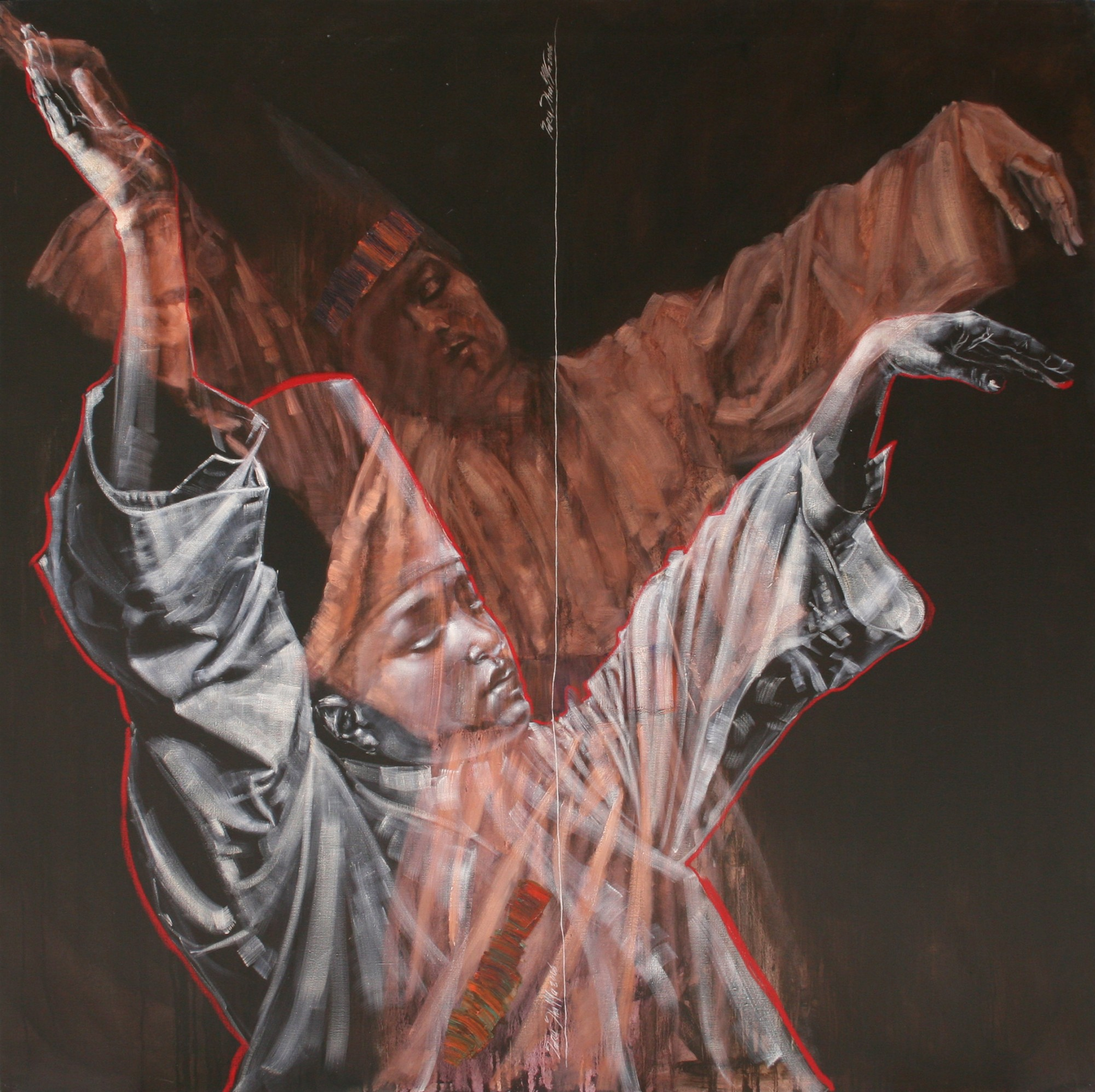
Untitled (2006), oil on canvas, 175×175 cm

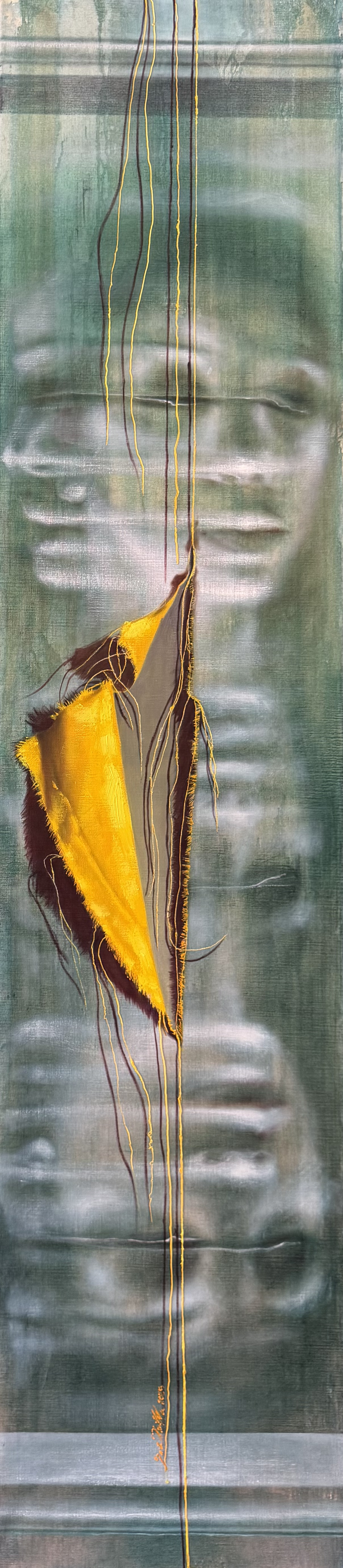
Untitled (2025), oil on canvas, 45×200 cm

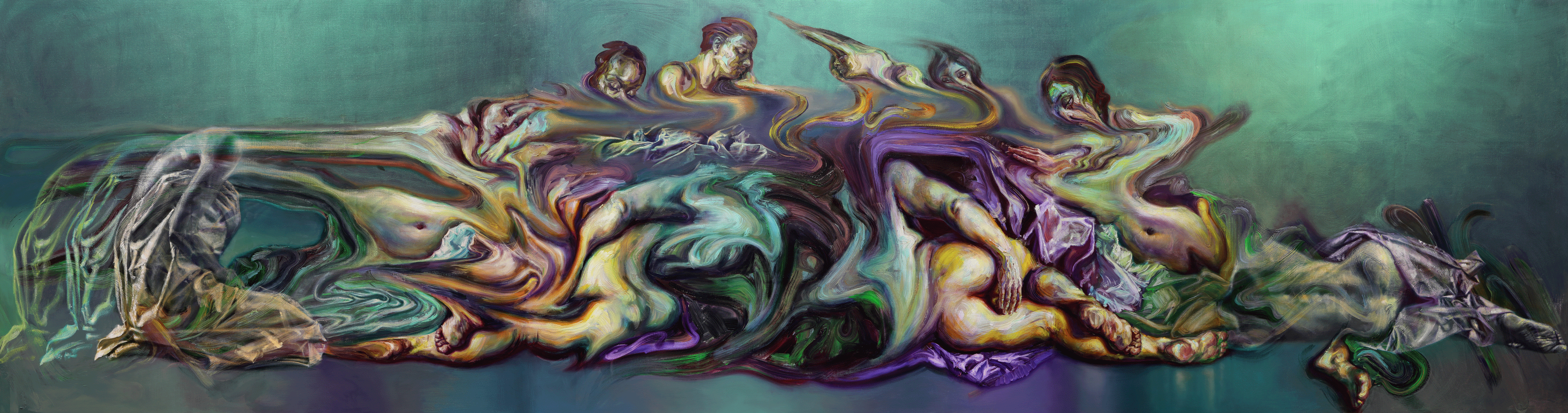
Untitled (2023), oil and acrylic on canvas

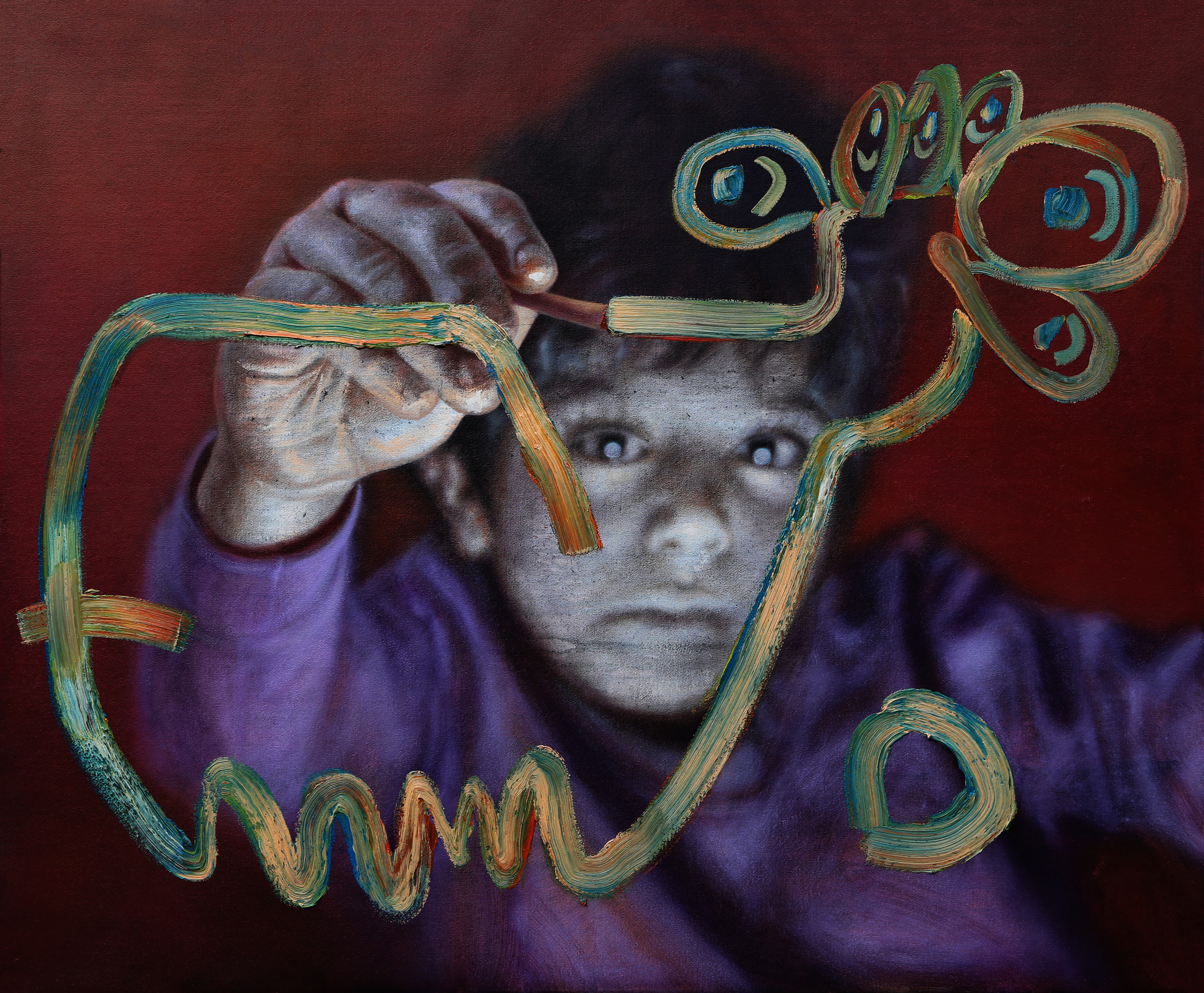
Alien (2016), oil on canvas, 120×100 cm

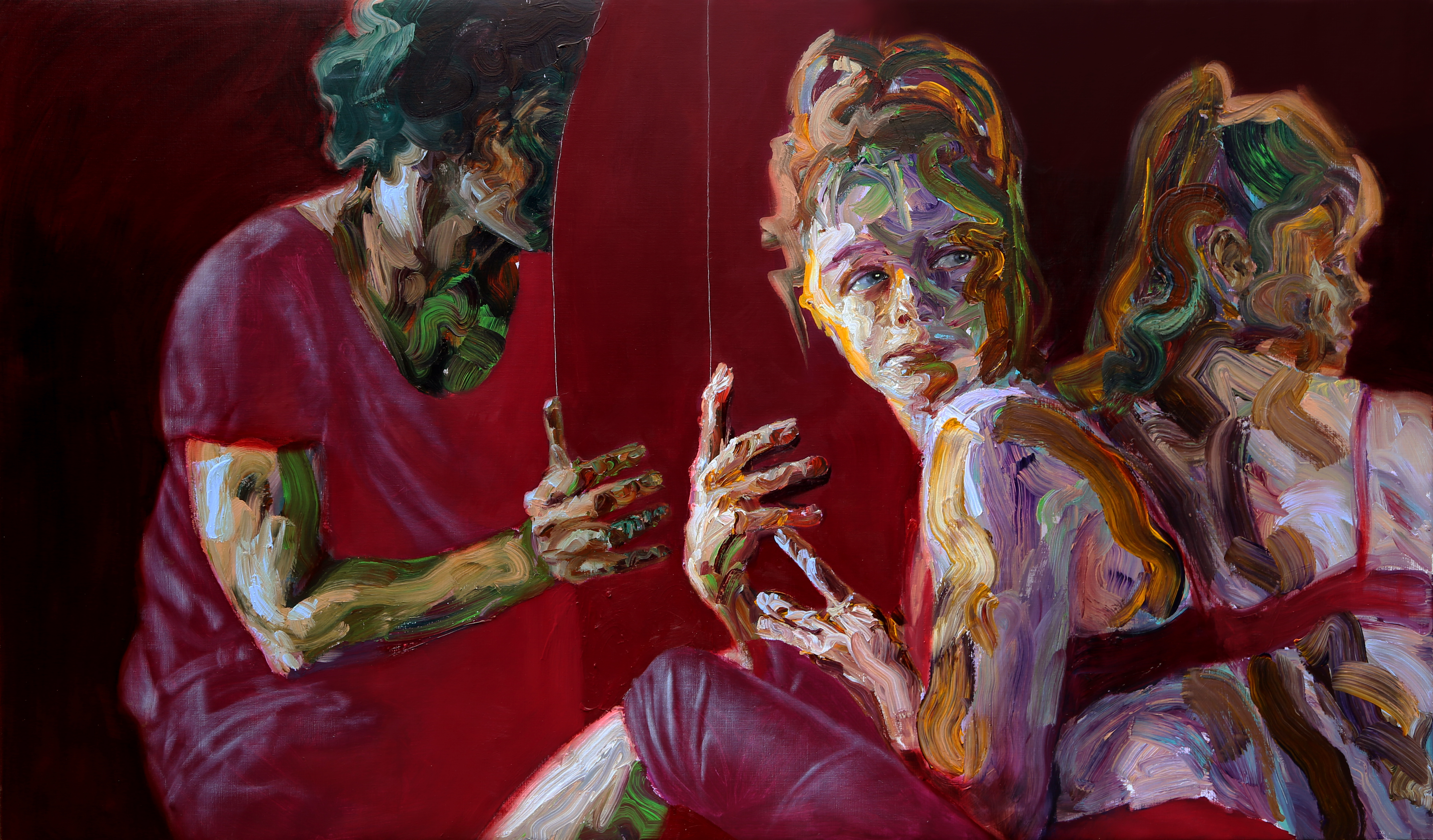
Hidden in Plain Sight (2019), oil and acrylic on canvas, 255×150 cm

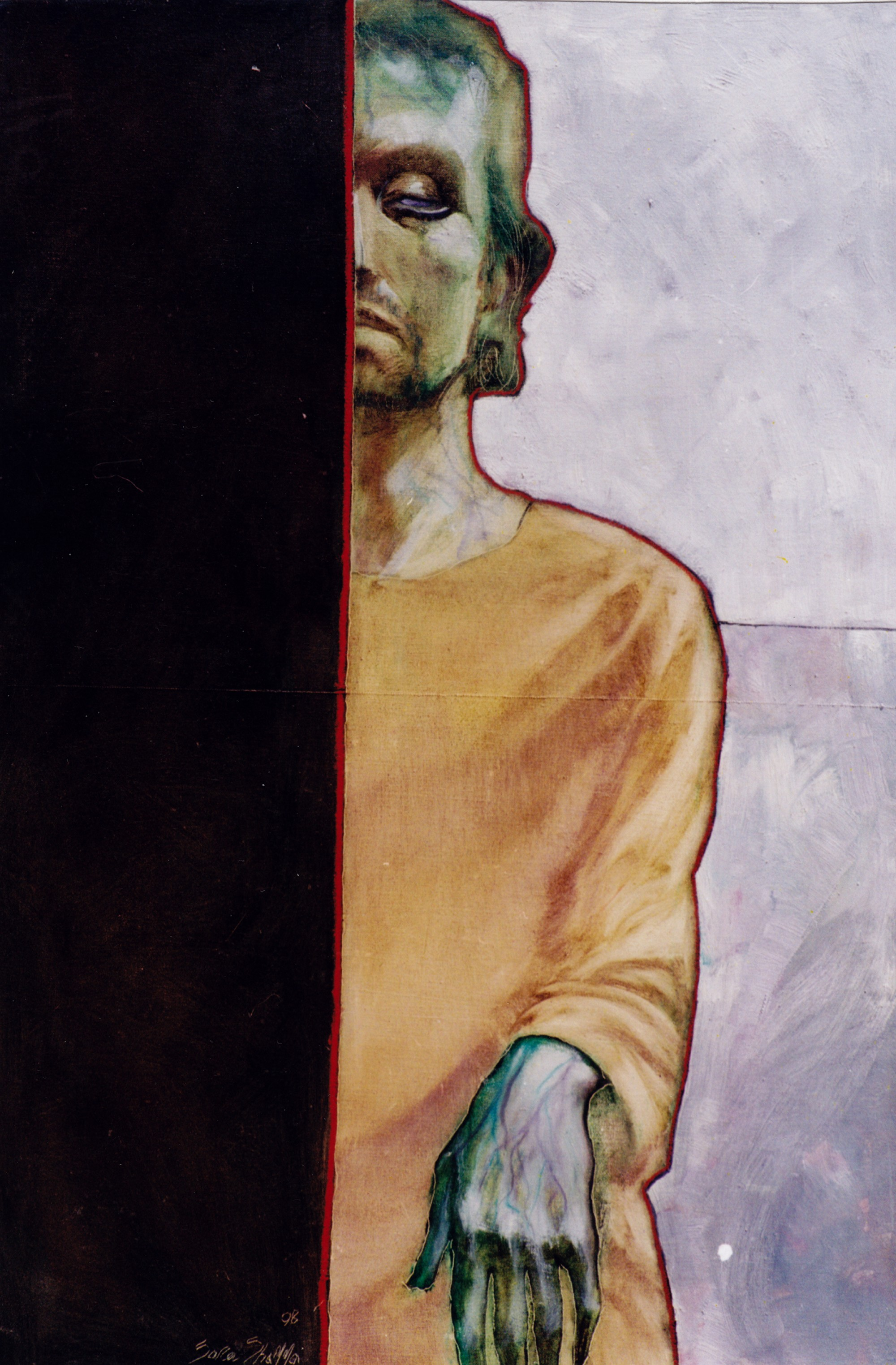
Untitled (1998), oil on canvas, 80×120 cm

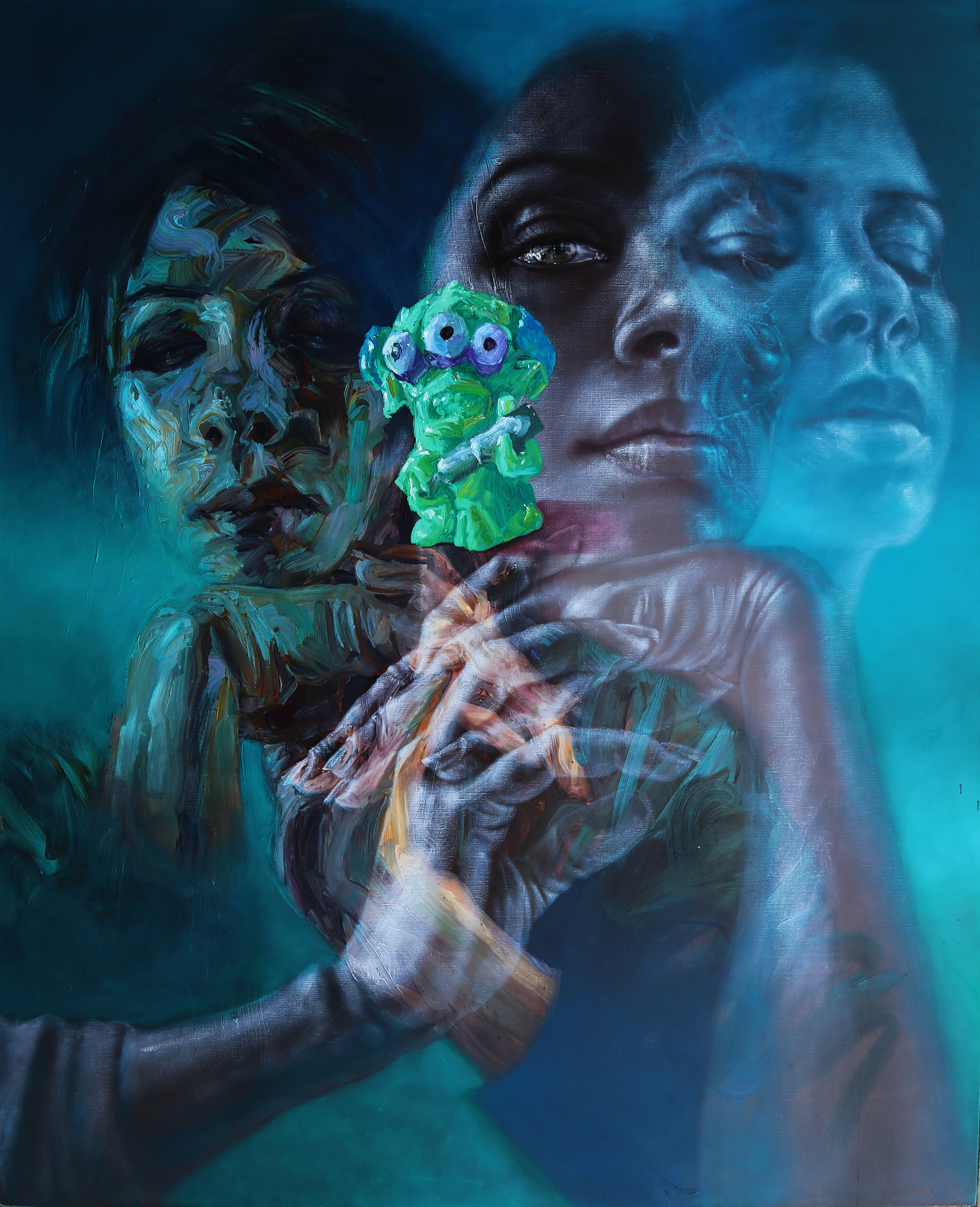
Self‑portrait (2018), oil on canvas, 200×250 cm

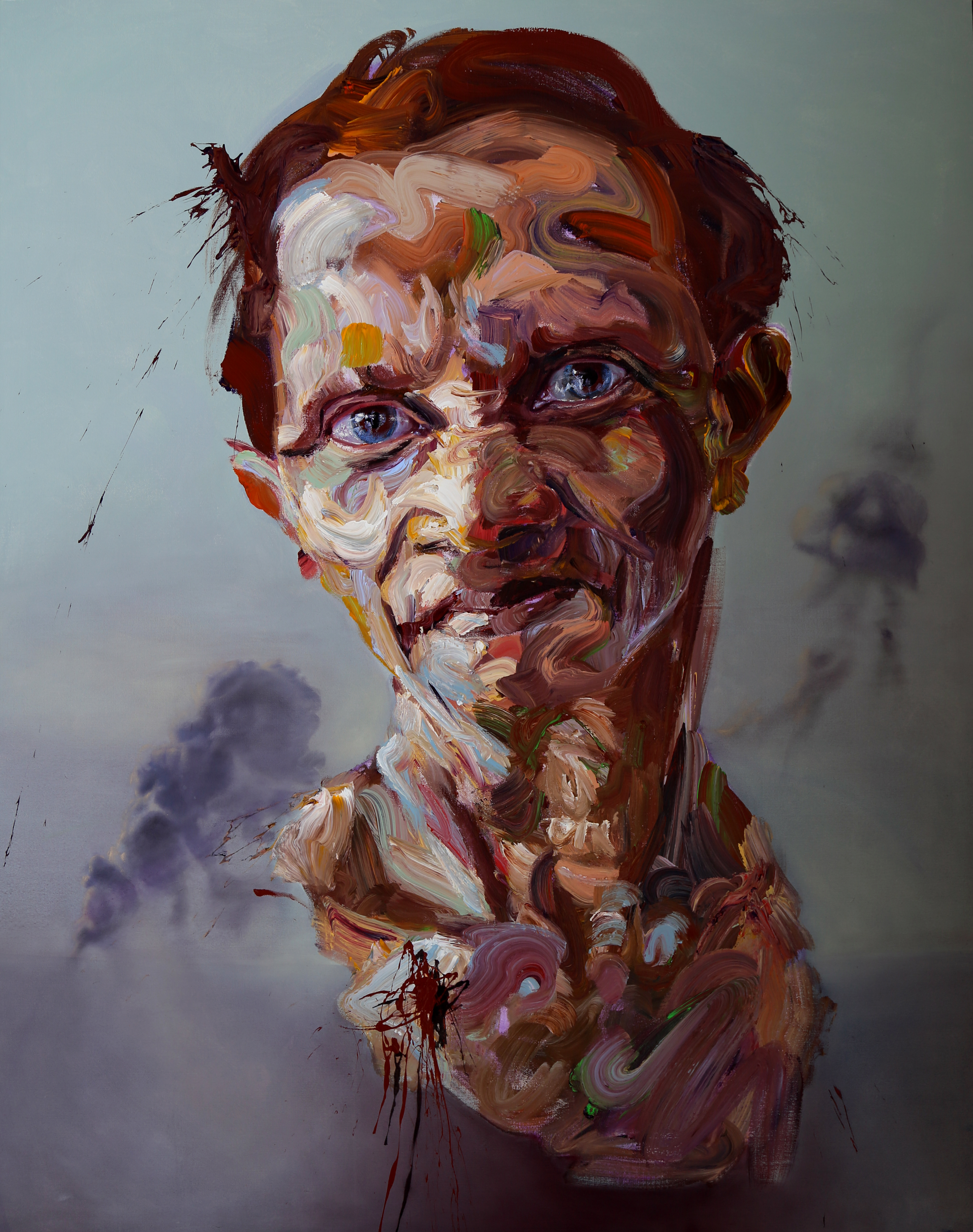
Woman in Smoke (2014), oil on canvas, 200×250 cm
