= Tom Bouden =

Belgian comics artist

- Born: 1971 (age 54–55) Ostend
- Area: Cartoonist
- Notable works: The Importance of Being Earnest; In Bed with David & Jonathan; Queerville
- Awards: Prix Saint-Michel

Tom Bouden (born 1971) is an openly gay Belgian artist, best known for his comics albums, which often satirize old-fashioned Belgian comics.

== Biography ==
Tom Bouden was born in Ostend, Belgium, in 1971. He started making comics with his friends when he was 9 years old, and later studied animation in Ghent. He began to focus on gay themes when a gay youth group asked him to draw a promotional poster for them. He started working for several gay magazines, and in 1993 these comics were collected as the book Flikkerzicht. This was followed by Max en Sven, a semi-autobiographical story about a boy who falls in love with his best friend.

== Career timeline ==
1990: a gay youth club asks Tom Bouden to make some illustrations for a new campaign. Soon, the figures on the poster (Max and Sven) have leading parts in their own comic. Based on these stories, Tom Bouden is asked to draw a comic on a regular basis for the monthly Belgian gay-magazine ZiZo. A year later, the Dutch magazine Expreszo follows.

1994: The gags from these magazines are collected in his first album, Flikkerzicht.

1997: Publication in the Dutch Gay-Krant, scripts for Disney-Comics and various texts for TV and theatre.

1998: Tom Bouden begins to work as assistant for Hec Leemans, author of the famous Flemish newspaper comic FC De Kampioenen.

2000: Publication in the German magazine 'Queer' and 'Freshmen', the Dutch Gay & Night and the English DNA-magazine. The 12th album is published in German and English. He's also busy writing stories for The Smurfs.

2002: The first Kid City-book, based on the site www.kidcity.be is published in French and Dutch by Editions Dupuis.

2004: A second English publication:the book Max and Sven (Green Candy Press), and a French publication: Max et Sven (H&O).

2007: The German publisher Bruno Gmünder starts publishing books by Bouden in English.

2010: Bouden reboots De Lustige Kapoentjes.

Bouden's comics have been translated into French, German, English, Spanish, and Italian.

Next to his gay comics, Bouden also works on adaptations of novels and children comics based on Flemish TV-shows. He worked very briefly as a writer for The Smurfs and Donald Duck.

== Publications in English ==
- The Importance of Being Earnest
- Max and Sven
- In bed with David & Jonathan
- Stripped, the illustrated male
- Queerville

== Magazines he's worked for ==
- Zizo (Belgium)
- Expreszo (Netherlands)
- Gay Krant
- Gay & Night

== Other publications ==
- Flikkerzicht 1
- Flikkerzicht 2 'Ook Voor Hetero's'
- Flikkerzicht 3 'Jongens Onder Elkaar'
- Flikkerzicht 4 'Max En Karel'
- Flikkerzicht 5 'Het Mysterie Van De Gouden Cockring'
- Flikkerzicht 6 'Uit De Kast'
- Flikkerzicht 7 'Een spook, een fuif en een eigen huis'
- Flikkerzicht presenteert: Vieze Prentjes
- Boudewijn De Grom, Graaf Van Vlaanderen
- Quasimodo
- De Mémoires Van Madame de Coeur-Brisé
- Extra Smal
- Rond de wereld in 80 dagen
- Romeo en Julia
- Suster en Wiebke
- De lichtrode Ridder
- Paniek in stripland
- W817 nrs 14 & 15
- En Daarmee Basta! ( 12 books )

== Awards ==
2006: Prix Saint-Michel for best Dutch comicbook with 'Het belang van Ernst' ( translated as 'The Importance of being Earnest' )
