= Southern Sugar Bakery =

Bakery based in Raleigh

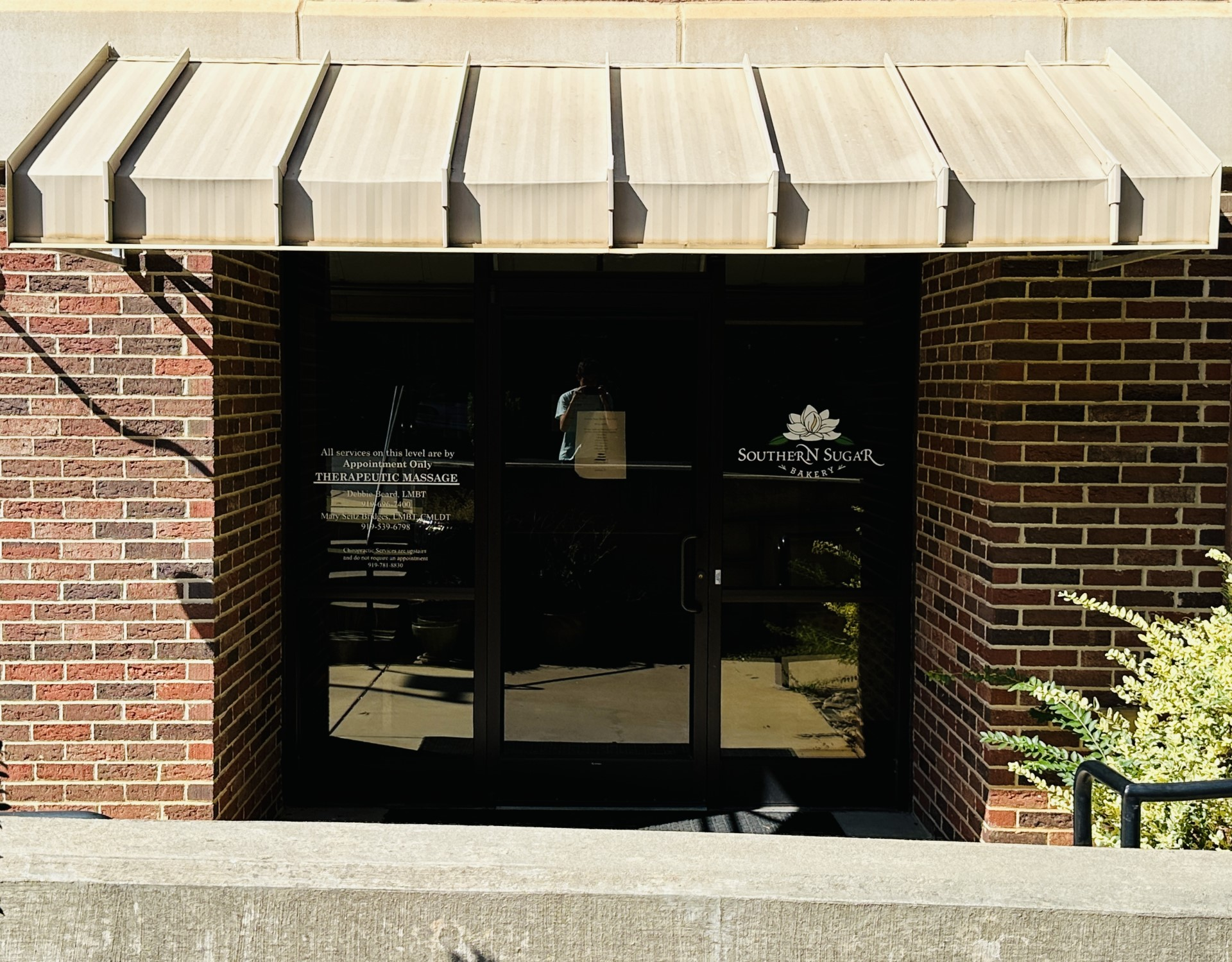
- The storefront in September 2023
- Trade name: Southern Sugar Bakery LLC
- Company type: Privately held company
- Founded: 2013
- Founder: Angie Tucker and Christin Kubasko
- Website: southernsugarbakery.com

Southern Sugar Bakery is a privately owned bakery based in Raleigh, North Carolina that is known for decorated cookies in all shapes and sizes.

== History ==
Southern Sugar Bakery was started by former school counselors, Angie Tucker and Christin Kubasko, in 2013. They began baking cookies part-time in Angie’s kitchen as an NC licensed home bakery. In 2015, the bakery moved to a commercial kitchen as a full-time operation with additional employees. Southern Sugar Bakery has been featured on the Today Show, ABC 11, Our State Magazine, WRAL TV, Country Living Magazine, Good Mythical Morning with Rhett and Link, Raleigh Magazine, Walter Magazine, and Southern Bride and Groom. They provided cookies for the 2017 Country Music Awards official after party.

== Products ==
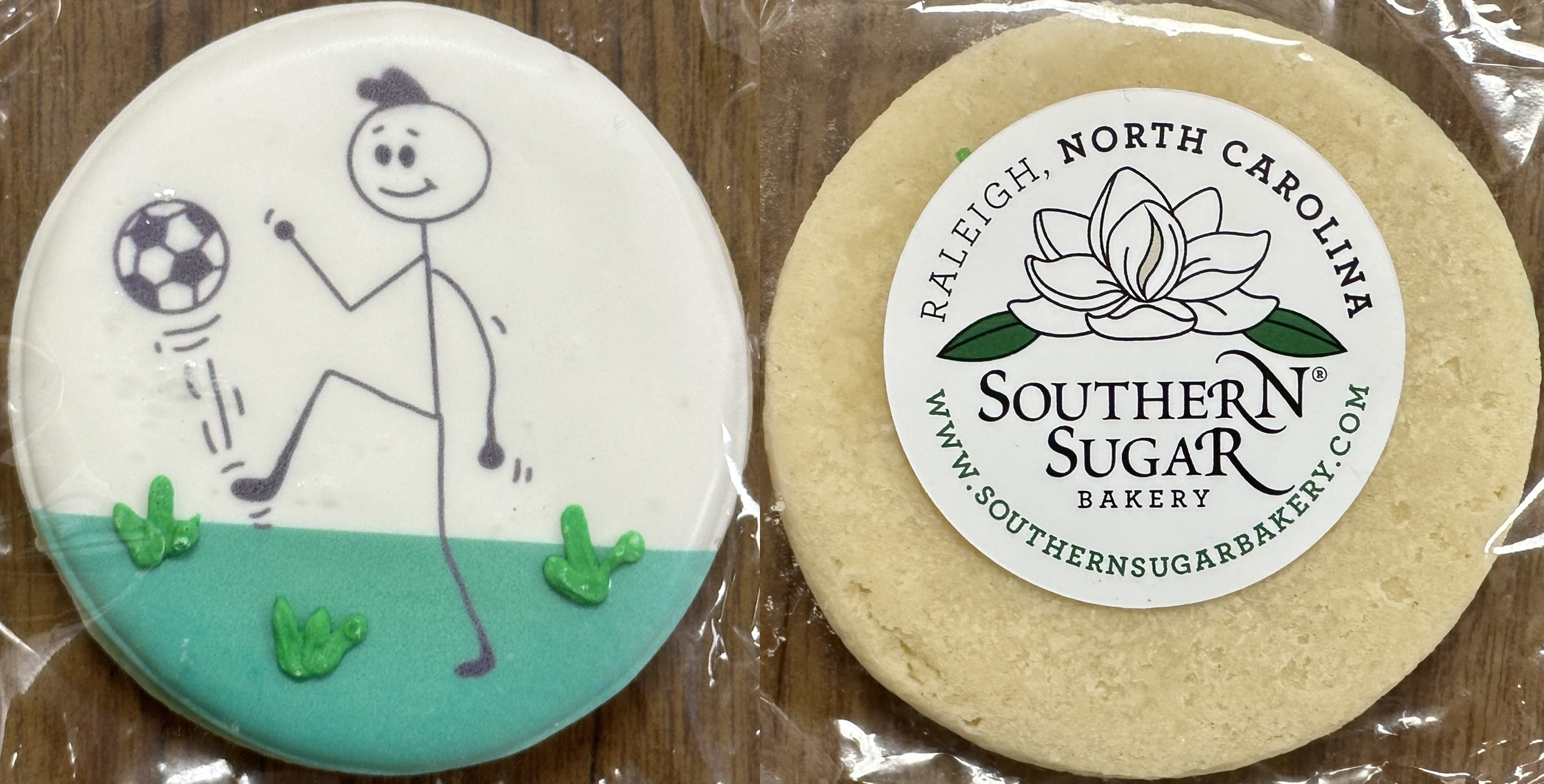
An example of one of their cookies

Southern Sugar Bakery produces custom decorated cookies, semi-custom decorated cookies, cookie cakes and teaches cookie decorating classes.
