= Friedenberg =

Friedenberg may refer to:

- Friedenberg, Missouri, United States
- Edgar Z. Friedenberg (1921–2000), American scholar
- Johnny Sequoyah Friedenberg (born 2002), American actress
- Judi Friedenberg (born 1950), American bridge player
- Michael Friedenberg, American media executive
- Richard Friedenberg, American screenwriter and director
