= Sandra Benede =

Nigerian model

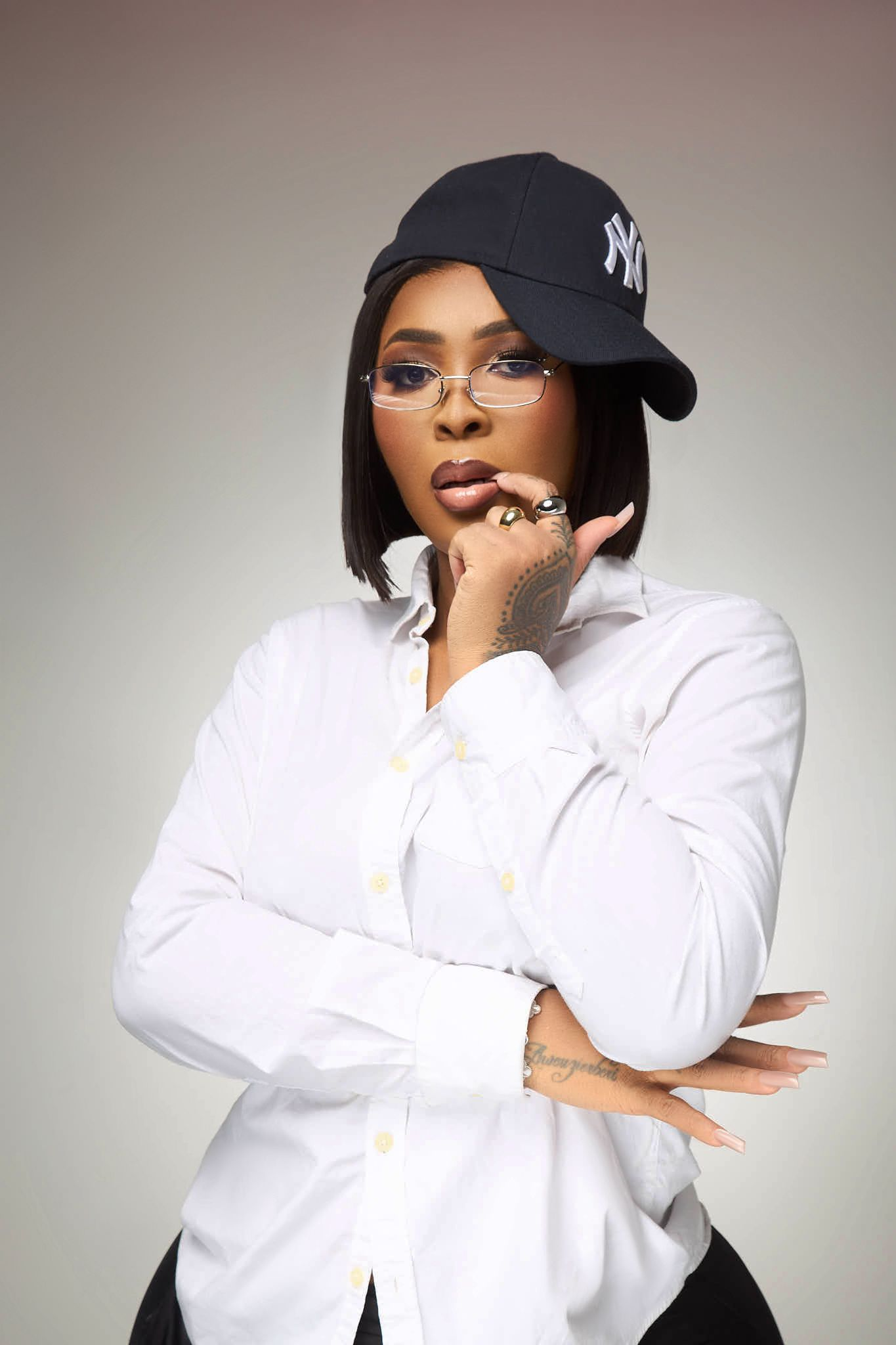
Sandra Benede in 2025

Sandra Ebipade Benede, professionally known as Sandra Benede, is a Nigerian model, fashion entrepreneur, comedian, and digital content creator. She began her career in Nigeria through pageantry and modelling before transitioning into social media, where she became one of TikTok's leading live-streamers.

== Career ==
=== Modelling and pageantry ===
Benede began her career in beauty pageants, winning Miss Minna and Miss Peace Day Bayelsa State. She also reached the semi-final stage of the Miss Jetset competition in the United States. In addition to pageantry, she appeared as a video vixen in music videos for Nigerian musicians Phyno and Timaya. In 2014, Benede attracted media attention after Nollywood actor Jim Iyke was linked to her in entertainment reports following his relationship with actress Nadia Buari.

=== Social media and TikTok ===
Benede transitioned from modelling into digital content creation, establishing herself first on Instagram and later on TikTok.(subscription required) By 2025, she had over 1.2 million TikTok followers and had become one of the platform’s most prominent Nigerian live-streamers. She was awarded TikTok’s LivePro badge in recognition of sustained engagement and achieved Level 44 on the platform’s gifting system. Several of her live-streams have attracted between 3 million and 4.7 million views, according to TikTok analytics reported by Pulse Nigeria. Her content combines humour with relatability, and she has stated that live interaction allows her to connect more directly with audiences. Media commentators have described her success as reflective of a broader trend of Nigerian influencers building digital communities through interactive content.

== Philanthropy ==
Benede has used her platform to support disadvantaged individuals and families, including paying school fees, covering rent, and funding small businesses. She has said that her philanthropic efforts stem from her own experiences of financial struggle while growing up.

== Personal life ==
Benede has spoken about her Ijaw heritage, though she does not speak the language fluently. She has cited American media personality Kim Kardashian as a role model. She has been linked in the media to Nigerian singer Naira Marley, after sharing affectionate birthday videos and photos with him in 2022. In April 2025, rumours circulated that she was the mother of Marley’s twin daughters, though she publicly denied the claims, clarifying that her remarks were made jokingly during a live-stream.

== Achievements ==
Benede has received recognition on TikTok, including the LivePro badge awarded in 2025 for her live-streaming engagement. She views her achievements not only in terms of online metrics but also through her philanthropic initiatives. She has expressed plans to expand into mainstream media and establish a foundation to integrate entertainment with social impact.
