= Hai (magazine) =

Indonesian teen magazine

- Categories: Teenage boys
- Frequency: Weekly (1977-2016); Monthly (2016-2017); Online (2017-present)
- Format: Print (1977–2017); Online (2017–present)
- Publisher: Kompas Gramedia
- Founder: Arswendo Atmowiloto; Dani Satrio
- First issue: 5 January 1977
- Final issue: June 2017 (print)
- Country: Indonesia
- Based in: Jakarta
- Language: Indonesian
- Website: hai.grid.id

Hai (stylized in lowercase since 2005; Hi) was an Indonesian weekly magazine for teenage boys. It was first published in 1977 by Kompas Gramedia and was headquartered in Jakarta. Hai focused on comics, serial stories and celebrities and offered information about the latest entertainment and feature stories on current issues and events.

On 1 June 2017, the magazine published its last issue — Hai brand currently only exists in its online portal hai.grid.id.

== See also ==
- List of teen magazines
