= List of United States magazines with online archives =

This is a list of magazines in the USA that have online archives. This is not to be confused with webzines which do not print a hardcopy edition and instead provide it online only, typically via the World Wide Web.

== U.S. magazines with online archives ==
- Biblical Archaeology Review (1975- )
- The Caribbean Pioneer
- The Christadelphian Tidings of the Kingdom of God
- GEMC GEORGIA Magazine (formerly RURAL GEORGIA Magazine) (1945- )
- Legends Magazine (1990- )
- Lookinside Magazine (1923- )
- Tampa Bay Parenting Magazine (2008- )
- Time (1923- ) (pay)

== Cornell archive ==
- Cornell magazine archive (free)
- The American Missionary (1878 - 1901)
- The American Whig Review (1845 - 1852)
- The Atlantic Monthly (1857 - 1901)
- The Bay State Monthly (1884 - 1886)
- The Century (1881 - 1899)
- The Continental Monthly (1862 - 1864)
- The Galaxy (1866 - 1878)
- Harper's New Monthly Magazine (1850 - 1899)
- The International Monthly Magazine (1850 - 1852)
- The Living Age (1844 - 1900)
- Manufacturer and Builder (1869 - 1894)
- The New England Magazine (1886 - 1900)
- The New-England Magazine (1831 - 1835)
- New Englander (1843 - 1892)
- The North American Review (1815 - 1900)
- The Old Guard (1863 - 1867)
- Punchinello (1870)
- Putnam's Monthly (1853 - 1870)
- Scientific American (1846 - 1869)
- Scribner's Magazine (1887 - 1896)
- Scribner's Monthly (1870 - 1881)
- The United States Democratic Review (1837 - 1859)

== See also ==
- Magazine
- Media of the United States
