= Susie Shellenberger =

American writer and speaker

- Education: Southern Nazarene University
- Writing career
- Notable works: Brio, SUSIE Magazine

Susie Shellenberger is an American speaker, author, and magazine editor.

== Career ==
Shellenberger has a bachelor's degree from Bethany Nazarene College (1978). She taught high school speech and English teacher, and was a youth pastor. She created Brio, Focus on the Family's publication for teen girls in 1989, and presented "realistic role models" while using magazines such as Seventeen magazine for ideas. She edited the magazine throughout its 19 years of publication. In 2001, she founded Brio and Beyond for girls aged 16 to 19. For seven years she co-hosted a national weekly call-in radio show for teens, called Life on the Edge Live, also produced by Focus on the Family. When Focus on the Family ceased publication of Brio, Shellenberger joined forces with marketing agency Premier Studios to create SUSIE Magazine, a monthly print magazine, in 2009. Shellenberger shared the messages of the SUSIE brand with young people by speaking before music concerts played by ZOEgirl.

She also led teens on mission trips to different countries, including Brazil, Panama City, and the Caribbean. She has been featured as a keynote speaker for the Girls of Grace conferences with Point of Grace and has also traveled as an opening act for singer Rebecca St. James. Shellenberger has written multiple books, starting with There's a sheep in my mirror in 1985. Her books have been reviewed by several newspapers and by School Library Journal.

== Honors and awards ==
Olivet Nazarene University awarded her its Lifetime Achievement Award in 2010.

== Selected publications ==
- Shellenberger, Susie (1985). There's a sheep in my mirror!. Kansas City, Mo.: Beacon Hill Press of Kansas City. ISBN 0-8341-1054-7. OCLC 12738694.
- Johnson, Greg; Shellenberger, Susie (1991). Getting ready for the guy/girl thing : two ex-teens reveal the shocking truth about God's plan for success with the opposite sex. Ventura, Calif., U.S.A.: Regal Books. ISBN 0-8307-1485-5. OCLC 24211530.
- Shellenberger, Susie (1995). Lockers, lunch lines, chemistry, and cliques. Greg Johnson. Minneapolis: Bethany House Publishers. ISBN 1-55661-483-7. OCLC 31938785.
- Shellenberger, Susie (September 12, 2000). Dear Diary: A Girl's Book of Devotions. Zonderkidz.
