= Michael Friedenberg =

American media executive

Michael Friedenberg was an American media executive and the president of Reuters, the international news organization owned by Thomson Reuters.

== Education ==
Michael Friedenberg graduated in 1989 with a BS in business finance from the University of Delaware’s Alfred Lerner College of Business and Economics.

== Career ==
=== Early career ===
Friedenberg started his career as an account executive selling ads to tech companies. He later joined United Business Media, working in various sales management positions. In 1999, he was appointed to vice president and publisher of InformationWeek, and later vice president and group publisher of the InformationWeek Media Network and co-founder of Optimize magazine. In this role, he managed multiple brands across print, online, events and research services. Friedenberg’s career also includes work with Cardinal Business Media and vertical publications at HP Professional, Midrange Systems and DEC Professional.

=== International Data Group ===
He was named President and CEO of IDG Enterprise in 2009 to oversee IDG’s brands, websites, products and services. In August 2013, he joined IDG Communications U.S. as CEO. He was appointed Global CEO of IDG Communications in November 2013, a role he held until October 2017 when he stepped down became an IDG Board Member.

=== Thomson Reuters ===
Friedenberg joined Thomson Reuters as president of Reuters News in December 2018, where he led all aspects of the company’s media business and operations. He led the acquisition of FC Business Intelligence (FCBI) in 2019, a global business-to-business events specialist, now called Reuters Events.
