= Latterly =

Latterly was a quarterly independent magazine and website that publishes longform journalism, news, opinion and photo essays focusing on political and social justice issues globally.

== History ==
The magazine was founded in Bangkok in 2014 and was edited by Ben Wolford. It is notable for launching as a website that "doesn't care about page views." It developed, and subsequently discontinued, an iOS app. In May 2016, Latterly became a publication on the Medium platform and joined its revenue beta program. In September 20116, Latterly announced the hiring of former New York Times foreign correspondent Laura Kasinof. Latterly earns revenue through subscriptions and donations. The magazine partnered with other media companies, including Newsweek, The Week, and Ulyces, to produce and translate articles. Latterly published its first print edition in December 2016. On 24 January 2017, Latterly broke news that U.S. President Donald Trump was planning to issue Executive Order 13769 banning immigrants from specific countries and prioritizing the refugee resettlement of religious minorities. The publication ceased operations and published its last print edition in 2018.
