= Airliners (magazine) =

American former magazine

- Categories: Airlines / Airliners
- Frequency: Bimonthly
- Founded: 1988
- Final issue: 2012
- Company: Airliners Publications
- Country: United States
- Based in: Miami
- Language: English
- Website: www.airliners.tv
- ISSN: 0896-6575

Airliners was an American magazine dedicated to the airline industry. It was published bimonthly. The title was first published by World Transport Press in 1988. From the 100th issue (July/August 2006) it was produced by Airliners Publications. For a time, the editorial headquarters of the magazine was in Castro Valley, California, although it later was based in Miami.

The civil aviation magazine included articles about the world of commercial aircraft and air carriers, including new low cost airlines, changes at legacy companies, jetliners such as the Airbus A380 and Boeing 787, trips around the world, historical airlines, adventurous flights, airliner crashes and pictures of airliner liveries.

Featured authors included John Adlard, Sebastian Schmitz, Dave Nichols, Ben Wang, Bill Hough, Joel Chusid, Royal King, Robbie Shaw, and Cody Diamond. Photographers contributed images of airlines, aircraft, personnel, facilities and operations.

The magazine's first editor was John Wegg, who left Airliners to found Airways Magazine in 1994. Subsequent editors were Bryant Pettit, Nick Veronico, Jon Proctor, David Kaufman and Jay Selman. Starting with the November/December 2007 issue, the editor was Dwayne Darnell. On December 11, 2009, Darnell announced that he was leaving, and that designer/Creative Director Robert Christensen would lead the magazine.

In 2010, Robert Christensen announced plans for a series of online initiatives, releasing e-book formats of the print magazine and establishing a social media presence. The magazine was re-titled Airliners & Airports. Popular components of past issues such as the Air Photo News section were being returned to the magazine's pages, but around the end of December 2012 the magazine abruptly ceased publishing and the website is no longer active.
