= Alaska (magazine) =

American periodical magazine

- February 2009 cover of Alaska
- Editor: Michelle Theall
- Art Director: Steven Merritt
- Assistant Editor: Tim Lydon
- Contributing Editors: Nick Jans; Bjorn Dihle; Emily Mount; Molly Rettig
- Former editors: Russ Lumpkin
- Categories: Life in The Last Frontier, Travel
- Frequency: 10 per year
- Publisher: W. S. Morris IV
- Total circulation: 80,600 (2019)
- Founder: Emery Fridolf Tobin, J. Ray Roady
- Founded: 1935
- Company: Azalea Media, LLC
- Country: United States
- Based in: Anchorage, Alaska
- Website: alaskamagazine.com
- ISSN: 0730-5842

Alaska is a periodical devoted to news and discussion of issues and features related to Alaska. Most of its readership consists of persons outside of Alaska who are interested in the Alaskan way of life.

== History and profile ==
Alaska magazine was founded in 1935 in Ketchikan, Alaska, by Emery Fridolf Tobin (1895–1977) and J. Ray Roady (1907–1997). Tobin established himself as an opponent of Alaska statehood, although this may have been contradictory, given his ties to the Democratic party and the fact that he and Roady served as State Representatives in 1959.

Alaska magazine was originally titled the Alaska Sportsman Magazine, a name it retained until 1969. Another major difference is that the editorial and sales offices have moved to Alaska's economic center, the city of Anchorage.

The magazine was sold to the partnership of fur trader Robert A. Henning and journalist Robert N. DeArmond in 1958. Henning helmed the magazine for nearly 30 years, mostly under the corporate name of Alaska Northwest Publishing Company, and was known as an enthusiastic promoter of Alaska. Henning, quoted in 1971 about the magazine, said "I'm my own best customer when it comes to selling Alaska. We haven't scratched the surface of the tourist business yet".

As of October 2026 the magazine was owned by Azalea Media, LLC, a Georgia-based company which also publishes Fly Tyer and Gray’s Sporting Journal. Morris acquired Alaska Magazine in 1995.
