= Island Sports Media =

Sport news organization in Hawaii, US

Island Sports Media is a Hawaii sport news organization.

== Business ==
Island Sports Media Magazine is published quarterly. It is published by JAMK Photography owned by Steve Kajihiro in Everett, Washington. The group also publishes a blog.

== Athlete of the Year Award ==
The annual Island Sports Media Athlete of the Year Award is given to an athlete (of any sport) with a connection to the islands of Hawaii, who are outstanding athletes and role models both on and off the field. The winners are selected by a combination of votes from Island Sports Media writers and photographers, sponsors, various coaches, and fans.

Island Sports Media gave one award in its initial year of 2008 to David Veikune of the University of Hawaii football team. In 2009 the award included both a youth and collegiate level. Each category, after a nomination process, has three finalists. Fans are then able to vote for their favorite athlete with a portion of the vote counting.

Year	Youth	Collegiate
2008	None	David Veikune, Hawaii, Football.
2009	V.J. Fehoko, Farrington High School, Football	Annett Wichmann, Hawaii, Track & Field

Year	Youth Finalists (*Fan Vote Winner)	Collegiate Finalists (*Fan Vote Winner)
2009	*V.J. Fehoko, Farrington High School, Football; Andrew Manley, Leilehua High School, Football; Kona Schwenke, Kahuku High School, Football	*Jeremiah Masoli, Oregon, Football; Greg Salas, Hawaii, Football; Annett Wichmann, Hawaii, Track & Field
