= Y'all (magazine) =

American magazine

Y'all magazine is an American magazine based out of Oxford, Mississippi, literary hub of the American South. It was published bimonthly with a circulation of 100,000 and features Southern celebrities, events and ordinary people with extraordinary stories to tell. According to the magazine's mySpace page, "Y'all covers the South's 15 states and its 103 million people, just like kudzu."

== History and profile ==
Y'all was founded in 2003 by Jon Rawl when he noticed that there was an absence of magazines devoted to Southerners, their culture and interests. The first issue of Y'all appeared on newsstands in November 2003, featuring New Orleans-born Harry Connick Jr., on the cover. The magazine covered The Shoals, Mark Sanford, Jeff Foxworthy, Food Network personality Paula Deen, the NASCAR, humorist Lewis Grizzard, and performer Miley Cyrus. The magazine was named by Folio magazine as one of the top 30 launches of 2003 out of 950 magazines.

In order to boost the magazine, Y'all founded several radio networks. The radio networks, featuring timely sports programming, were becoming more popular than the magazine, with a network of radio sports programming that features independent voices that offer commentary on Major SEC and ACC teams, including Buzzline, Dawgdial, and Y'all Tipoff, a show featuring previews of ACC and SEC basketball.
