= Hello Mr. =

American lifestyle magazine

- Cover of Issue 07 (April 2016)
- Editor-in-Chief: Ryan Fitzgibbon
- Frequency: Semiannual
- Founder: Ryan Fitzgibbon
- First issue: March 2013; 13 years ago
- Final issue: July 2018; 7 years ago
- Company: Hello Mr. Inc.
- Country: United States
- Based in: Brooklyn, New York, New York
- Language: English
- Website: hellomrmag.com
- ISSN: 2201-8220
- OCLC: 829322335

Hello Mr., stylized as hello mr., was a semiannual American lifestyle magazine focused on topics of interest to gay men. The magazine described itself as being "about men who date men," though the magazine tackled both queer and queer-adjacent topics. Each issue, between 150 and 200 pages in length, featured fiction, personal essays, interviews, art, and photography and photo essays.

The magazine was founded by Ryan Fitzgibbon in 2012. Initial funding was provided by a Kickstarter crowdfunding campaign, which raised over $26,000. The first issue was published in March 2013, at which time the magazine was based in Darlinghurst, Australia, a suburb of Sydney. When the magazine's second issue was published in October 2013, the magazine had relocated to Brooklyn, New York. There, Fitzgibbon was joined by his editorial partner Fran Tirado, art director Zhang Qingyun and photo editor Ryker Allen as they worked together to develop and diversify the magazine's editorial voice and identity. Throughout its history, the magazine has been printed in Germany. As of July 2018, the magazine had printed and distributed ten issues.

Hello Mr. and Fitzgibbon have been covered by The Daily Beast, GLAAD, The Huffington Post, Lambda Literary, and OUT, as well as smaller publications including The Blot, I Love Paper, It's Nice That, Melting Butter, Posture, and The Wild.

On July 12, 2018, Fitzgibbon announced that the magazine's tenth issue would be its last, closing after six years to move onto other projects.
