= The Black Cannabis Magazine =

American quarterly magazine

- Editor: Hazey Taughtme
- Categories: Cannabis
- Frequency: Quarterly
- Format: Print and Digital
- Founder: Hazey Taughtme
- Founded: 2021
- Country: United States
- Based in: Sherman Oaks, Los Angeles, CA
- Website: blackcannabismagazine.com
- ISSN: 2768-0002

The Black Cannabis Magazine is a quarterly magazine which publishes content related to cannabis, specifically for black community. Hazey Taughtme is the current editor-in-chief of the magazine.

== History ==
The magazine was founded by Steven Palmer, professionally known as Hazey Taughtme. He is also the founder of Haze Ent.

In April 2021, the magazine published its first print edition. The edition covered American television host Whoopi Goldberg's brand, Emma & Clyde, in an exclusive interview with her and was the cover feature of the edition. The magazine also published a profile of Corvain Cooper who has been imprisoned for nonviolent marijuana crimes. Aside from this, it also covered Jay-Z's Monogram line for cannabis.

== Cover features ==
- Whoopi Goldberg (April 2021)
