= Mi Gente Hispana Magazine =

- July 2008 cover (Issue 3, Number 14)
- Editor-in-Chief: Michael Person; Victor Alarcon
- Categories: Lifestyle magazine
- Frequency: Monthly
- Total circulation: 82,211 (US) (2010)
- Founded: 2006
- Final issue: April 1, 2010
- Company: LGO Corporation
- Country: United States
- Based in: Washington, D.C.
- Language: English
- Website: www.migentehispana.com

Mi Gente Hispana, Inc. is a media company based in Washington, D.C., in the United States. Founded in 2006, Mi Gente Hispana, Inc. publishes information for and about Hispanic empowerment in the United States. Mi Gente Hispana features the best thinkers, trendsetters, and next-generation leaders in the Hispanic American community. Mi Gente Hispana ignites conversation, promotes empowerment and celebrates aspiration.

In a 2006 article in Hispanic Business magazine, Mi Gente Hispana Magazine is quoted as "La voz y alma de la cultura hispana." (transl. "The voice and soul of Hispanic culture") Mi Gente Hispana runs the gamut with issues that reflects highly upon Hispanic men, women, teens, children, and family. It also serves as a medium to not only inform but also entertain its audience through the use of positive images and messages.

== Target markets ==
The magazine is mainly marketed towards Hispanic professionals, entrepreneurs, opinion leaders, members of Hispanic organizations, and students. Mi Gente Hispana also promotes local artists by providing them a venue to showcase their talent (dance, music, fashion) via the website as well as Mi Gente Hispana's annual MGH Fest, which is held in numerous cities every August.

== Magazine ==
The company's flagship publication was Mi Gente Hispana Magazine. The magazine was the premier English language lifestyle publication for U.S. Hispanics. It was launched in the spring of 2006, is the source for news and information about Hispanic culture from across the United States and around the globe. The magazine carried articles on the current events, health information, political trends and lifestyle news that the young and older Latin American audience needs and wants to know and it was delivered in a creative and stylish way. Its forums, message boards, and blogs helped readers interact with the community and keep connected to our culture. An events calendar detailed local events and activities for young Latino professionals happening in their local area. The magazine was the "bookmarked" destination for everyday users. On March 2, 2010, Mi Gente Hispana announced that it would fold the magazine as of April 1, 2010, although it would keep the web site.

== Website ==
Website is offline as of 4 September 2017 MiGenteHispana.Com is a comprehensive website for bringing Hispanic Culture from the streets of the Latin American community to the internet through the means of relevant topics as well as blogs. Topics including Current Events, Culture, Health and Entertainment make Mi Gente Hispana reading material for all age groups. Forums and message boards keep readers interactive with their community and their culture.
