= Old News =

Old News was an American tabloid-format newspaper containing original articles on ancient history and modern history, written in a popular style. It was published seven and later six times a year by Susquehanna Times & Publishing Co., of Landisville, Pennsylvania. The publication began in 1989 after an earlier venture by the publisher, Susquehanna Magazine (which succeeded the defunct Susquehanna Times), had folded. During the 1990s, it used mailing lists of historical publications to send out samples of the newspaper, which helped drive growth. Its reporting sought to include overlooked details of historical events. Having over 33,000 subscribers c. 2002, by 2012 the number of subscribers had dropped to around 23,000, having been impacted by the rise of the internet. The publication ceased at the end of 2024.
