= Two Mundos =

Two Mundos Magazine is a quarterly, bilingual (English/Spanish) lifestyle and entertainment magazine based in Miami with distribution in South Florida, Washington, D.C., New York City, Los Angeles, Bolivia, Argentina, Paraguay and Spain. Its genre in bookstands is Bilingual Lifestyle Publications.

It was founded in 2003 by Enerdesigns Media Group, Inc. and is a high-end glossy lifestyle magazine, 9x11 with over 120 pages.
