= Jetset Magazine =

American lifestyle magazine

- Issue 4 2015
- Categories: lifestyle, travel, real estate
- Frequency: Quarterly
- Founder: Darrin Austin
- Founded: 2006 (20 years ago)
- Country: United States
- Based in: Scottsdale, Arizona
- Language: English
- Website: jetsetmag.com

Jetset Magazine is an American lifestyle magazine founded in 2006 by Arizona based businessman and philanthropists Darrin Austin. The magazine is aimed at those with an affluent lifestyle. It is available as a quarterly print magazine and is distributed in private jets, private yachts, private jet terminals, yacht charters, exclusive resorts and events around the world. It is also available online with content created on a weekly basis.

== Editors ==
- Darrin Austin - entrepreneur, philanthropist
- Robert Kiyosaki – entrepreneur, author, Rich Dad Poor Dad
- Daymond John – entrepreneur; founder, FUBU
- Barry LaBov – entrepreneur; chief executive officer
- Ken McElroy – real estate investor; author
- Tom Zenner – executive editor, Rylin Media; television sports anchor
- Scott Walcheck – philanthropist and investor
- Tami Austin - editor-in-chief

== Readership ==
The magazines targeted readership is the wealthiest one percent. The print magazine is circulated exclusively to private airport lounges, private yachts, exclusive events and travel locations. It is selective with advertisers to ensure it retains its target audience.

== Covers ==
The magazine has featured many celebrities and entrepreneurs on the cover, with exclusive interviews. These include Richard Branson, Tom Hanks, Margot Robbie, Jackie Chan, Daniel Craig, Tom Cruise, Dwyane Wade, Donald Trump, Dwayne Johnson, Ryan Reynolds, Scarlett Johansson, Chris Hemsworth, Charlize Theron and Hugh Jackman.

== Controversy ==
In 2014, the magazine interviewed and filmed Dana White in his office where he revealed he had a piece of art which contained cocaine and black tar heroin within it.

Famously, the magazine featured American presidential candidate Donald Trump on the cover of its issue 4 in 2015 with exclusive pictures from inside his private jet.

== Miss Jetset ==
The magazine runs an annual competition to find "Miss Jetset". Women from all around the world compete, while raising awareness for the Andrew McDonough B+ Foundation, a children's cancer charity.

- 2015 winner - Becca Tepper
- 2016 winner - Laura Lydall
- 2017 winner - Adaliz Martinez
- 2018 winner - Lara Sebastian
- 2019 winner - Enea Culverson
- 2020 winner - Janeilla Burns
- 2021 winner - Tanaya Peck
- 2022 winner - Jessica Ceballos

== See also ==
- List of United States magazines
