= Sculptural Pursuit =

Sculptural Pursuit was a quarterly art/literary magazine published by Hammer & Pen Productions, a Denver, Colorado publishing company. The magazine focuses on sculpture, its collectors and enthusiasts, but painting and poetry are also frequently featured.

== History and profile ==
Sculptural Pursuit was founded in 2002 by Denver-based stone sculptor Nancy DeCamillis after a shoulder injury prevented her from sculpting. Since then, the magazine's distribution and readership grown dramatically. The magazine - along with its two accompanying e-zines, Creative Wisdom and On The Lookout - had readers throughout North America, Europe, and Asia.

Since its inception, Sculptural Pursuit became a resource for practicing sculptors, providing them with advice on the business side of an art career, as well as practical tips and techniques that can be applied to sculpting. It also provides artist profiles and tips that help collectors of sculpture develop their collections. In January 2010 it was announced that the magazine folded.
