= Teen Ink =

American magazine

- The April 2007 cover of Teen Ink
- Categories: Teen magazine
- Frequency: Monthly
- Founded: 1989
- Company: StudentBridge
- Country: United States
- Based in: Atlanta, Georgia
- Language: English
- Website: www.teenink.com
- ISSN: 1545-1283

Teen Ink is a monthly tabloid-format magazine which is marketed to, and written by, teenagers. It is based in Atlanta, Georgia, and published by StudentBridge. The magazine's name was originally The 21st Century.

== Books ==
Teen Ink also prints a series of anthologies with selected writing from the magazine; they are co-published by HCI, publishers of the Chicken Soup series, and the Young Authors Foundation.

The anthologies which have been published so far include:

- Teen Ink: Our Voices, Our Visions, 2000; ISBN 978-1-55874-816-3
- Teen Ink 2: More Voices, More Visions, 2001; ISBN 978-1-55874-913-9
- Teen Ink: Friends and Family, 2001; ISBN 978-1-55874-931-3
- Teen Ink: Love and Relationships, 2002; ISBN 978-1-55874-969-6
- Teen Ink: What Matters, 2003; ISBN 978-0-7573-0063-9
- Teen Ink: Written in the Dirt, 2004; ISBN 978-0-7573-0050-9
- Chicken Soup for the Teen Soul, 2007, ISBN 978-0-7573-0682-2
- "Teen Talk: Insight on Issues That Matter To Teens and the Adults Who Care About Them", 2022, ISBN 978-1737971900

Teen Ink also publishes a magazine with the best work, written or art, from its creators. Anyone between the ages of 13 and 19 can sign up and publish their work, which, if it is appropriate, will be published to their website. Some of these works receive Editor's Choice awards, and the best is published in the magazine.

Teen Ink is the largest site for teen creators. In October 2020, it changed ownership.

== Poetry Journal ==
Poetry is a major focus of this magazine and is published in each monthly issue.
