= 20 Ans =

French magazine

- Cover of 20 Ans
- Categories: Women's
- Frequency: Monthly
- First issue: 1961
- Final issue: 2010
- Company: Publications Louchel (1961–?); Publications Groupe Media (?–?); Excelsior Publications (1987–2003); Emap (2003–2007); FT Médias (2009–2010)
- Country: France
- Language: French

20 Ans ("20 Years old"), was a French monthly women's magazine. It was published from Paris between 1961 and 2007, then from 2009 until 2010, targeting middle-class adolescents.

== Background ==
20 Ans ("20 Years old"), is a French monthly women's magazine. It has been published from Paris, since 1961 and is mainly read by middle-class adolescents. 20 Ans absorbed 'Jacinte' in 1986 and was briefly published as 20 Ans Jacinte.

The magazine was published by Excelsior Publications from 1987, until its 2003 acquisition by Emap France. Emap was acquired by Arnoldo Mondadori Editore in 2006.

The publications circulation reached 250,000 monthly copies in July 2006. However, in 2007 the magazine ceased publication. Then returned in 2009 under the ownership of FT Médias. It ceased publication in 2010 following an exposé on the working conditions at the publication (notably the editor-in-chief being a 19 year old intern) by 20 Minutes.

=== Editors ===
Editor-in-Chief	Start year	End year	Ref.
Jean-Jacques Thiébaut			
Agathe Godard			
Yveline Dupuy			
Emmanuelle Alt	1993	1998	
Claire Crepon	2009	2009	
