= Gray's Sporting Journal =

- The November/December 2006 cover of Gray's Sporting Journal.
- Editor: Mike Floyd
- Associate Publisher: Mike Floyd
- Art Director: Jennifer Keller
- Shooting Editor: Terry Wieland
- Angling Editor: Scott Sadil
- Copy Editor: Sherry Foster
- Staff writers: Will Ryan (Traditions); Georgia Pellegrini (Eating); Brooke Chilvers (Art); Teresa Mull (Books)
- Categories: Outdoor Sporting Literature
- Frequency: 7 issues per year
- Publisher: W. S. Morris IV
- Total circulation: 28,200 (2017)
- Founded: 1975
- Company: Azalea Media, LLC
- Country: USA
- Based in: Augusta, Georgia
- Language: English
- Website: www.grayssportingjournal.com
- ISSN: 0273-6691

Gray's Sporting Journal is a magazine dedicated to the pursuit of outdoor recreation, with an emphasis on hunting and fishing. It is a consciously literary publication, using a "blind reader" to select articles, poems, and stories for publication. The blind reader receives only the text of the submitted work, not the name of the author, thus theoretically preventing publication of works based on fame only.

== History and profile ==
Gray's Sporting Journal was established in 1975. The magazine is published seven times a year. The headquarters is in Augusta, Georgia. It employs perfect binding and always features a work of outdoor art on its cover. Gray's includes poetry, lengthy works of fiction, fine art, and photo journals in the same issue. The magazine is owned by Azalea Media, LLC which also owns publications Fly Tyer and Alaska. The company acquired Gray's Sporting Journal in June 2026.

In January 2021 Mike Floyd became the editor of Gray's Sporting Journal. Known for its photography as well as its fiction, it has published the work of such writers as E. Annie Proulx, Rick Bass, Pete Fromm, Ron Carlson, and C.B. Bernard.

== Regular features ==
"Shooting," with Terry Wieland, features a different aspect of the shooting sports in each issue.

"Gray's Best," a feature published yearly, selects the best outdoor equipment across the range of sports Gray's covers.
