= Logan (magazine) =

American disability magazine

Logan Magazine
- Editor: Logan Olson
- Categories: Youth with Disabilities
- Frequency: Bi-Monthly
- First issue: 2006
- Company: Logan Magazine
- Country: United States
- Based in: Spokane, Washington
- Language: English
- Website: loganmagazine.com

Logan is an American magazine for young people with disabilities.

== History ==
Logan magazine was first published in 2006. The magazine was created by Logan Olson after she concluded "the world needs a magazine for young women with disabilities". The headquarters of the magazine is in Spokane, Washington.

== Coverage ==
Logan's articles are targeted towards young adults living with disabilities. The magazine features fashion, easy-to-handle beauty products, college & career resources, and lifestyle articles.

The magazine also profiles successful young men and women with disabilities, as well as celebrity interviews, including Ginny Owens, Bethany Hamilton, and Adam Morrison to provide inspirational testimonies and advice on life.

Olson has said that she created the magazine to offer readers reassurance that they are not alone, a feeling she longed for when she was recovering from surgery.
