= Optimize (magazine) =

Optimize was an American monthly business magazine published between November 2001 and June 2007.

== History and profile ==
Optimize was established in November 2001. Brian Gillooly was the founder and also, served as the editor-in-chief of the magazine which was headquartered in Manhasset, New York. The magazine was part of CMP Media LLC.

Its peer-based business leadership content for CIOs was incorporated into the pages of InformationWeek. Optimize was a magazine of which intended reader was a corporate officer; according to BPA International (as cited in "Media Kit 2004" listed in the "References" section), seventy per cent of the readers were chief information officers, chief technology officers, or vice presidents of information systems, while the remaining thirty per cent were "technology-involved" corporate officers.

Optimize published its last issue in June 2007.
