= Brio (magazine) =

American teen magazine

- Former editors: Susie Shellenberger
- Categories: Teen magazine
- Frequency: Bimonthly
- Founded: 1990
- Company: Focus on the Family
- Country: United States
- Based in: Colorado Springs, Colorado
- Language: English
- Website: BrioMagazine.com
- ISSN: 1048-2873

Brio is an American teen magazine that ran from 1990 to 2009 and resumed in 2017. It is currently published bimonthly by the American evangelical Christian group Focus on the Family, and it was formerly edited by Susie Shellenberger. The magazine presents topics typical of other teen magazines (fashion and beauty tips, music, and culture) from an evangelical Christian perspective. Focus on the Family also formerly published a version for teen boys, called Breakaway.

Brio and Beyond was a sister publication of Brio for older teen girls and young women, aged 16 to 21. It launched in October 2001 and was discontinued in 2009, along with the original Brio magazine.

In May 2009, Shellenberger launched a new magazine titled Susie, a successor to Brio without the involvement of Focus on the Family. The magazine was renamed to Sisterhood in 2011, and its final issue was published in December 2014.

After being on hiatus for over seven years, and over two years after the closure of Sisterhood, Brio began being published again in May 2017. The first new issue has Sadie Robertson from Duck Dynasty on the cover. The relaunch initially had ten issues published annually, but as of April 2019, publication is reduced to a bimonthly schedule of six issues annually.
