= Enter (magazine) =

Enter was an American magazine published from October 1983 to May 1985 by Children's Television Workshop (later renamed Sesame Workshop). The magazine was published ten times per year. Seventeen issues were printed in total. Similar to sibling titles Sesame Street, The Electric Company, and 3-2-1 Contact magazines, Enter was aimed at school-age children.

The focus of the magazine, as stated on the cover, was "The world of computers and new technology". Each issue included type-in programs in BASIC which readers could run on their own home computers. Readers were introduced to technological innovations of the day, such as optical disc recording.

Unlike other magazines produced by Children's Television Workshop, Enter did not tie into a television series produced by the organization. Beginning in June 1985, some of its features were folded into 3-2-1 Contact magazine, which printed computer programs as part of an "Enter section" for a short while. This section was later renamed "BASIC training".
