= NiNe. magazine =

Online teen magazine

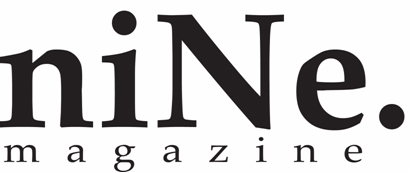
- Founder: Melinda Laging, Louise Wo
- Founded: 2005
- First issue: June–July 2006 [print]
- Final issue: May–June 2015 [print]
- Company: Nine Media LLC; Nine Magazine, Inc.
- Country: United States
- Based in: Denver, Colo.
- Website: ninemagazine.org

niNe. magazine is an online publication aimed at teenage girls, a production of Nine Media LLC, founded as a print magazine by Melinda Laging and Louise Wo in 2005. Currently an online-only enterprise, its Nine Magazine, Inc. print form reached a circulation of 20,000 and a subscriber-base throughout 43 states, the District of Columbia, and four Canadian provinces.

== Name ==
The name of the magazine is a reference to the Christian New Testament, specifically Paul's letter to the Galatians (5:22-23), which lists the nine characteristics said to be ways that the Holy Spirit contributes to a quality life: love, joy, peace, patience, kindness, goodness, faithfulness, gentleness and self-control.

== History ==
Nine Magazine, Inc. was formed in Colorado by Melinda Laging and Louise Wo, who began publishing a magazine aimed at teenage girls while attending the University of Colorado-Boulder.

Following graduation, Laging and Wo organized a board of directors and established the framework of the publication. With the economic conditions of the late 2000s, Nine Magazine, Inc. began restructuring to improve upon its initial digital platform.

Originally formed as a print publication, niNe. shifted to online-only content to reduce production costs, beginning in the fall of 2011.

== Content philosophy ==
The editors of the magazine argued that current media outlets aimed at young women focus on entertaining, selling, and engaging their audience "through content that is in the interest of the outlet rather than the audience". They note that by addressing the facts of important issues head-on, the magazine can dedicate its pages to promoting self-esteem, volunteerism, philanthropy, positive journalism and literacy for adolescent girls. The creators of niNe. magazine have been stated as using this direct, unabashed approach to educate its audience and reconstruct the manner in which media communicates to a youth-oriented audience. They note that the philosophy seeks to engage the audience in the discussion of a topic without having conflicting messages in its advertising. niNe. is described as seeking to avoid advertisements that demean women or young girls, instead it seeks out advertisers that reinforce the beauty, intelligence, worth and strength of women.
