= Raleigh Magazine =

Magazine based in Raleigh, North Carolina

- The February 2024 issue of Raleigh Magazine
- Editor-in-Chief: Melissa Howsam
- Associate Editor: Lauren Kruchten
- Publisher: Gina Stephens
- Founder: Gina Stephens
- Founded: September 2015; 9 years ago
- Based in: Raleigh, North Carolina
- Language: English
- Website: Official website

Raleigh Magazine is a small and primarily woman-run magazine based in Raleigh, North Carolina. Founded in 2015 by Gina Stephens, the magazine primarily reports on culture, dining, and entertainment in the city and surrounding communities. Work conducted by the magazine has been cited by larger local news broadcasters, including The Herald-Sun, The News & Observer, and WRAL, and has gained notability for its ranked list articles.

== Founding and leadership ==
The magazine was founded in September 2015 by Gina Stephens. Prior to starting Raleigh Magazine, Stephens had been involved in the media industry for over thirty years. Alongside Stephens as the magazine's Publisher, there are six other leadership positions: being the Editor-in-Chief, headed by Melissa Howsam, Associate Editor, headed by Lauren Kruchten, Editorial Assistant, headed by Anna Beth Adcock, Account Executive, headed by Debby Serena and Cameron Rhinehardt, and Creative Director, headed by Liz Reed. Freelance writers and photographers, as well as interns, are also employed to help produce work for the magazine. Their headquarters is located on 6511 Creedmoor Road, Suite 207, Raleigh, NC 27613.

== Format ==
The magazine primarily covers topics relating to culture, dining, and entertainment stories in Raleigh, alongside some longer in-depth journalism. The magazine produces ten physical prints each year, and publishes daily digital stories on average. The physical prints have a subscription fee of "$10 for 10 issues", or can be acquired for free at over 200 locations around Raleigh. The magazine often publishes lists relating to Raleigh, such as ranking local cuisine or Raleighites. These ranked lists have been reviewed by larger local news agencies like The News & Observer. Physical prints of the magazine have also been reviewed on-air by WNCN, and announcements and work produced by the magazine have been referenced by The Herald-Sun, The News & Observer, and WRAL. Outside of publishing, Raleigh Magazine has in the past hosted a charity walk to raise money for ALS research and treatment.
