= The Christadelphian Tidings of the Kingdom of God =

American magazine

Christadelphian Tidings
- Country: United States

The Christadelphian Tidings of the Kingdom of God (The Tidings) is a Bible magazine published monthly by the Christadelphians (Brethren in Christ).

The Tidings intended readership is Christadelphians in North America and provides news on Christadelphian events in that area, but also provides general articles of Biblical exposition and exhortation. Although the readership is mostly North American the magazine is circulated more widely.

Current and back issues can be viewed on the Internet.

== Other publications ==
For several years The Caribbean Pioneer, which had previously a separate publication, was published as a section within The Tidings; from January 2005 it was integrated into the larger magazine.

Back issues of the magazine can be viewed on the Internet.

The Tidings magazine committee also publishes books. The content of these books most often start as Tidings articles. Some of the books currently published by Christadelphian Tidings Publishers include: -

- Essays to Believers by Don Styles - a collection of essays on practical Christian living.
- John Thomas: His Friends and His Faith by Peter Hemingray - a 'series of glimpses' into the origin of the Christadelphian movement founded by John Thomas in America.
- Legalism vs. Faith by David Levin - an examination of faith in contrast to the legalistic religion of the Pharisees, with application to the lives of modern Christians.
- Miracles by John C. Bilello - an examination of some of the New Testament's miracles, focusing particularly on those that Jesus performed.
- Parables by John C. Bilello - an examination of some of the parables of the Lord Jesus in light of the historical traditions of the Talmud.
- Understanding the Bible by A. D. Norris
