= Wave (magazine) =

English language monthly magazine

- Editor: Latshering Glan Tamang
- Categories: Youth Magazine
- Frequency: Monthly
- Publisher: Annapurna Media Pvt. Ltd.
- First issue: August 1994
- Country: Nepal
- Based in: Kupondole, Lalitpur
- Language: English
- Website: wavemag.com.np

WAVE is an English-language, monthly magazine published by Annapurna Media Pvt. Ltd. The company acquired the magazine in 2013. Each month, the magazine publishes articles addressing the youth and their varied interests. Apart from touching on the lighter fun side, it also addresses more "serious" aspects - but from a youthful perspective. The magazine has a large impact on the urban Nepali youth.

WAVE magazine is based in Kupondole, Lalitpur.
