= Teen Now =

UK magazine, founded 2004

Teen now
- Editor: Marie-Claire Giddings
- Categories: Teenage
- Frequency: Monthly
- Circulation: 16,000+ (approx, publishers figures)
- Publisher: Time Inc. UK
- First issue: April 2004
- Country: United Kingdom
- Language: English
- Website: Teen now

Teen now is a monthly magazine for teenage girls published by Time Inc. UK. It is a spin-off from the entertainment magazine NOW. The editor is music journalist Marie-Claire Giddings, who co-wrote the biography of the winner of the first series of Pop Idol, Anything is Possible, with its subject, Will Young.

== Early history ==
The magazine was launched into an already crowded market in April 2004.
