= Fly Tyer =

- Editor: Russ Lumpkin
- Associate Publisher: Mike Floyd
- Art Director: Jennifer Keller
- Frequency: Quarterly
- Circulation: 30,000
- Publisher: W. S. Morris IV
- Founded: 1978
- Company: Azalea Media, LLC
- Country: US
- Based in: Augusta, Georgia
- Language: English
- Website: flytyer.com
- ISSN: 1082-1309

Fly Tyer is an American magazine dedicated to the subject of fly tying, the art of tying materials to a hook for the purposes of fly fishing. Published four times a year, Fly Tyer is currently the largest fly-tying magazine in terms of circulation. It usually features a close-up image of a fly on its cover.

== History ==
Fly Tyer was started in 1978. It was relaunched as a quarterly magazine by Abenaki Publishers in 1995, when it became clear that the market would support a fly-tying specific publication. Its success has proven the desire for fly tying content. Fly Tyer was also the original name of the publication that became American Angler.

Fly Tyer is an asset of Azalea Media, LLC, which also owns publications such as Gray's Sporting Journal and Alaska. The magazine is edited by Russ Lumpkin.

== Notable contributors ==
- Jay "Fishy" Fullum – columnist since 1994.
- Tim Flagler – 2023 “Fly Tyer of the Year”.
- Al & Gretchen Beatty – regular feature authors.
