= Expreszo =

Dutch-language LGBT-related magazine

Expreszo-logo

Expreszo is the only magazine for lesbian, gay, bisexual and transgender youth in the Netherlands and Flanders. The magazine is published bi-monthly.

== The philosophy ==
The name Expreszo does not refer to espresso. It is a combination of two Dutch words, Expres and Zo which would roughly be translated into English as On Purpose Like This. The name was invented by Peter Zwaal, who was the magazine's first editor-in-chief, though initially there was no such function as the magazine was made by an editorial collective. The name refers to the questions gay, lesbian, bisexual and transgender youths are confronted with when they decide to be open about their sexual identity. The Expreszo staff claim that there is no need for questions since there already are answers, saying "we're young, we're queer and there is nothing bad about that". This positive attitude from some gay and lesbian youths needed to be shared with other members of their generation who still struggled with their sexual identity.

The magazine Expreszo claims to give the readers the role models that they lack in daily life. The editors also write about serious issues. Coming out of the closet is a continuing story — and unfortunately HIV/AIDS is too. Besides that, while legal emancipation has come to a good ending in civil marriage and adoption rights for gays and lesbians in the Netherlands (2001) and Belgium (2003) and things have changed in society, intolerance from other (religious) minority groups towards gays and lesbians is still a big issue in the Netherlands.

Expreszo ran a poster campaign (Aisha is Cool / Ahmed is Cool, 2004) with kissing Muslim boys and girls. The campaign received a lot of media attention.

In order to get attention for the position of gay youth in highschools Expreszo (in co-operation with COC Netherlands) ran a project PinkQuest, resulting in a magazine Put da Cool back into School, distributed in most high schools in the country. Dutch MPs asked questions about the publication, which was co-funded by the Dutch Ministry of Education, Culture and Science, since a lot of "black" and Christian schools refused to hand out the magazine to their students.

== About the publisher and editors ==
Expreszo was established in 1998. It is claimed to be made for, and made by young people; for this reason, staff turnover is frequent. Over 40 staff members are involved in making the magazine, maintaining the website, and running the organization. This includes editors, desktop publishers, photographers, and other staff members. In spite of being a purely volunteer organization, they claim to have reached a professional standard.

In 1991, 1995 and 2001, the lack of funds seriously threatened the magazine in its existence. In 1995, the publisher, the Stichting Hoezo (Foundation), joined COC Netherlands, the largest lesbian and gay association in the Netherlands. COC boardmembers from 1995 formed the board of Hoezo/Expreszol further, COC Netherlands funded the magazine between 1995 and 2001. A benefit/rescue party in December 2001 gave new energy to the editorial staff. COC funding stopped, but with a new format (e.g. size, full color) the board and staff managed to boost sales and advertisement. For the first time Expreszo started making a profit.

A statute ensures that the editorial staff of Expreszo is independent in their writing; it is also independent from COC.

== Production and distribution ==
- The magazine was started as a newsletter from the Rotterdam gay youth group Apollo. After a few years, most readers and subscribers were outside the Rotterdam region. In 1990, it was decided to distribute the newsletter through bookshops all over the Netherlands (by Betapress). In 1999, distribution started in Belgium (by AMPnet).
- Expreszo is published six times a year. (It was published quarterly until 1994, 10 times a year in 1995, and 6 times a year starting in 1996.)
- The makers of Expreszo are all volunteers - mostly students.
- Expreszo is for sale in over 1,000 bookshops in Belgium and the Netherlands.
