= Digger =

A Digger is someone who digs.

Digger or diggers may refer to:

== Equipment ==
- Digger D-250, a demining machine produced by Digger Foundation
- Excavator, heavy construction equipment consisting of a boom, dipper, bucket and cab on a rotating platform
- Backhoe loader, digger or mini digger in British parlance
- Backhoe, digger or mini digger in British parlance

== People ==
- Digger (nickname)
- Digger (soldier), Australian and New Zealand slang for a veteran
- Digger Okonkwo (born 1977), Nigerian former footballer who played in Malta
- Digger Indians, ethnic slur for various groups of Native Americans in the southwestern US
- Digger, a person who frequently submits or reads stories on the website Digg

== Arts and entertainment ==
- The Diggers (Van Gogh), an 1889 painting by Vincent van Gogh

=== Fictional characters ===
- Willard "Digger" Barnes, in the American television series Dallas
- George "Digger" Harkness, the first Captain Boomerang DC Comics villain
- Digby "Digger" O'Dell, on the American radio and television shows Life of Riley and the 1949 film
- Diggers, characters in the video game Mega Man Legends
- Digger (Marvel Comics), the name of two Marvel Comics characters
- Digger, a character in Kathryn Lasky's book series Guardians of Ga'Hoole
- Digger Mole, from Shirt Tales

=== Film ===
- Diggers (1931 film), an Australian film
- Digger (1993 film), a Canadian film starring Leslie Nielsen
- Diggers (2006 film), an American film starring Paul Rudd and Lauren Ambrose
- Digger (2020 film), a Greek film
- Digger (2026 film), an American film

=== Television ===
- "Digger" (Bottom), a 1992 episode from the British television sitcom Bottom
- Diggers (TV series), a reality television show on the National Geographic Channel

=== Literature ===
- Digger (webcomic), a webcomic by Ursula Vernon
- The Digger (Scottish magazine), a Scottish weekly magazine
- The Digger (Australian magazine), a 1970s Australian magazine
- Diggers (1990), the second book in The Nome Trilogy by Terry Pratchett

=== Music ===
- Digger (band), a punk band
- The Diggers (band), a Scottish band

=== Video games ===
- Heiankyo Alien, a 1979 video game released as Digger in North America
- Digger (video game), a computer game from 1983
- Diggers (video game), launch title for the Amiga CD32 videogaming console
- Digger, one of the eight tools available in the video game Lemmings

== Sports ==
- Bendigo Diggers, former name of Bendigo Football Club, an Australian rules football club
- Manila Digger F.C., a Filipino football club
- Manila Digger F.C. (women), a Filipino football club
- Digger (mascot), mascot of the London Irish rugby football club
- Digger, the mascot for the NASCAR on Fox "gopher cam", from The Adventures of Digger and Friends

== Other uses ==
- Digger, Leh, India, a village
- Digger Creek, California, United States
- Digger wasp (disambiguation), multiple wasp families
- Diggers, a group of radicals during the English Civil War
- Diggers (theater), a 1960s collective of the Haight-Ashbury area of San Francisco, United States
- Digger, a style of motorcycle, similar to a chopper
- A nickname for a front engine dragster
- Digger Foundation, a Swiss non-profit specialised in demining

== See also ==
- Dig (disambiguation)
- Digging (disambiguation)
