= Cricket (magazine) =

American literary magazine for children

- Categories: Children's magazine
- Frequency: 9 per year
- Founder: Marianne Carus
- First issue: September 1973; 53 years ago
- Country: Carus Publishing Company
- Language: English
- Website: www.cricketmedia.com
- ISSN: 0090-6034

Cricket is an illustrated literary magazine for children published in the United States, founded in September 1973 by Marianne Carus whose intent was to create "The New Yorker for children."

== Description ==
Each issue of Cricket is 48 pages. The magazine was published nine times a year (monthly, with some of the summer months combined) by the Carus Publishing Company of Peru, Illinois. Its target audience is children from 9 to 14 years old. Until March 1995, Cricket was published by the Open Court Publishing Company of La Salle, Illinois, now part of Carus.

Cricket publishes original stories, poems, folk tales, articles and illustrations by such notable artists as Trina Schart Hyman, the magazine's art director from 1973 to 1979. Hyman contributed to the magazine until her death in 2004. Carus has solicited materials from well-known authors and illustrators, including Lloyd Alexander, Isaac Bashevis Singer, Hilary Knight, William Saroyan, Ursula K. Le Guin, Eric Carle, Stacy Curtis, Wallace Tripp, Charles Ghigna and Paul O. Zelinsky. Cricket also runs contests and publishes work by its readers.

One distinct feature of Cricket is the illustrated cast of recurring characters that appears in the margins of each issue, similar to a comic strip. These characters include Cricket, Ladybug, and other friends, most of whom are also insects. The characters are involved in a storyline that runs throughout the issue, but they also comment on the articles above them. They define difficult words, draw attention to unusual facts, and otherwise annotate the magazine's content.

On the last page of each issue is the "Old Cricket Says" column, in which Old Cricket offers a bit of wisdom, cracks a witticism, or introduces themes to be explored in the upcoming issues of Cricket. This recurring column has been ghostwritten by a number of authors and editors who worked for Cricket, but a preponderance of them were written by author Lloyd Alexander until his death in 2007.

In 2003, Cricket Books published Celebrate Cricket: 30 Years of Stories and Art, a retrospective that republishes stories from the magazine and includes interviews with some of the founders and contributors.

== Founding ==
Cricket was founded by a group of "historically minded writers and their artist and designer friends", led by Marianne Carus of Open Court Publishing. She had worked on "literature-based basic readers" for the school markets and had learned from teachers that there was a classroom demand for high-quality, short reading material. The time was right for a "new St. Nicholas Magazine".

The founding Editorial Board (November 1972) comprised Carus, senior editor Clifton Fadiman (a The New Yorker book critic and a Book-of-the-Month Club judge), art director Trina Schart Hyman, prominent authors Lloyd Alexander, Isaac Bashevis Singer and Eleanor Cameron, Horn Book Magazine editor Paul Heins, Kaye Webb (founder of Puffin Books and the doyenne of British publishers for children), Virginia Haviland (of the Library of Congress), and Sheila Egoff (Canada's then leading authority in children's literature).

The inaugural issue went on sale January 1973 with a launch party in New York City. One guest later told Carus, "If a bomb had gone off during your party, the entire children's book world would've been wiped out."

== Cricket Media children's magazines ==
Cricket inspired a line of literary magazines for children of different ages: Babybug, Ladybug, Spider for newly independent readers, Cricket, and Cicada for young adults.

In turn, Cricket Media now publishes 15 children's magazines, including the five "insects". Most of them are issued nine times annually.

Ages 14+

- Cicada: literary magazine (out of print, last issue: August 2018)

Ages 9–14

- Cobblestone (from 1980): American history
- Cricket (from 1973): literary magazine
- Dig: "archaeology—without all the dirt!" (out of print)
- Faces: people around the world: how they live
- Muse: STEAM (science, technology, engineering, arts, and math)
- Odyssey: Adventures In Science. 2000 Parent's Choice Silver Award.

Ages 6–9

- Ask: science, history, inventors, artists; "the most curious people"
- Spider: literary magazine

Ages 3–6

- Click: science, art, nature; one topic each issue
- Ladybug: literary magazine

Babies–3 years

- Babybug: "board-book style magazine"

Recently, these separate magazines for each section have been combined, with a new expanded Cricket magazine that incorporates titles such as Cobblestone, Faces, and Muse, Spider blending with Ask, and Ladybug with Click.

== Chatterbox ==
The Cricket Chatterbox was a forum on cricketmagkids.com/chatterbox where children around the Cricket age range (9-14, although there was no minimum or limit) gathered to talk about different issues. Founded in 2008, the Chatterbox (or the CB) began as a forum about the magazine, but grew to discuss many other topics, extending from writing inspiration to world issues and much more. Children who posted on Chatterbox (known as Chatterboxers or CBers) could start threads or post comments. Each of their posts were reviewed by a panel of three site administrators that made sure that the content was appropriate for the Cricket age range and that no personal information was shared.

After 18 years, Chatterbox closed on Monday, June 1, 2026, at 5pm Central Time. Many CBers have expressed how they would miss the forum, but would certainly keep in touch through the Letterbox and other means, such as a monthly substack.

== See also ==
- Open Court Publishing Company
- Carus Publishing Company
