= Jennifer Elvgren =

American writer

- Education: Regent University; Westminster College
- Occupations: Writer, journalist, press secretary
- Known for: Josias, Hold the Book; The Whispering Town

Jennifer Elvgren is an American author and journalist, and has worked as a press secretary for the American politician Rob Bell. She is known for her books Josias, Hold the Book and The Whispering Town, the former of which won the 2006 Américas Award.

== Awards ==
- Distinguished Achievement Award for Excellence in Educational Publishing from the Association of Educational Publishers (2004, won)
- Américas Award for Josias, Hold the Book (2006, won)

== Bibliography ==
=== Books ===
- Josias, Hold the Book (2006, illustrated by Nicole Tadgell)
- The Whispering Town (2014, illustrated by Fabio Santomauro)

=== Magazine articles ===
- Aislinn’s Caper (Illustrated by Sandy Rabinowitz, published in Highlights for Children, March 2003)
- Well Done, York (Illustrated by Gavin Rowe, published in Ladybug, July 2005)
- First Taste Sweet (Illustrated by Erica Pelton Villnave, published in Spider, March 2009)
- Gatherin’ Up the Mountain (Illustrated by Claire Ewert, published in Spider, April 2010)
- Nelly’s Sweet Song (Illustrated by Eric Freeberg, published in Spider, December 2011)
