= Babybug =

Babybug is an illustrated magazine of literature and art for children ages 6 months to 3 years. It is published in the United States by The Cricket Magazine Group, a division of Carus Publishing Company, 9 times a year, every month except for combined May/June, July/August, and November/December issues.

== History and profile ==
Babybug was launched in 1995 by Marianne Carus, Editor-in-Chief of Cricket magazine, in order to provide a magazine for infants and toddlers and a precursor to Ladybug. The magazine has its editorial offices in Chicago, Illinois.

Babybug offers a regular series, “Kim and Carrots,” written and illustrated by Clara Vulliamy, a noted British artist, whose mother was the beloved children's author, Shirley Hughes. Each issue of Babybug presents action rhymes, Mother Goose and other traditional nursery rhymes, basic concepts, and simple stories about a baby's world. The magazine also features a variety of art styles and media, including paint, watercolors, woodblock prints, tapestry, collages, and pastels.

Each issue is made of 24 sturdy cardstock pages, with rounded corners, non-toxic glue and ink, and no staples, which can be dangerous to toddlers. As with the other magazines published by The Cricket Magazine Group, Babybug accepts no advertising.

Included with every issue is a guide for parents written by the Erikson Institute’s Sally Nurss. This guide offers insights into early child development and suggestions for making read-aloud time more enjoyable. In July 2008, Babybug launched a new website, featuring book recommendations, “Ask Babybug,” and a “Parents’ Corner.”

An iPad version was announced in 2012.

Babybug is the only magazine for infants and toddlers spoofed by McSweeney's Internet Tendency.
