= Steven Rubenstein =

American anthropologist (1962–2012)

Steven L. Rubenstein
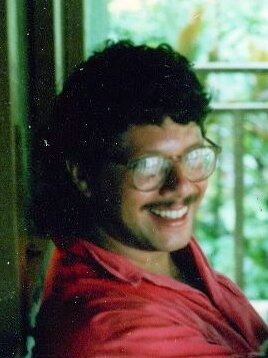
- Rubenstein in 1988
- Born: June 10, 1962; New York City, U.S.
- Died: March 8, 2012 (aged 49); Liverpool, England
- Education: BA anthropology, Columbia University and BA philosophy, Jewish Theological Seminary of America (joint program, 1984); MA anthropology, Columbia University (1986); PhD anthropology, Columbia University (1995)
- Occupations: Reader in Latin American Anthropology, University of Liverpool
- Website: Homepage, University of Liverpool

Steven Lee Rubenstein (June 10, 1962 – March 8, 2012) was an American anthropologist. He was reader in Latin American Anthropology at the University of Liverpool, and Director of Liverpool's Research Institute of Latin American Studies.

Beginning in the 1980s, Rubenstein worked with the Shuar people of Ecuador, documenting and analyzing practices of healing, the circulation of shrunken heads, and the ways in which the Shuar reacted to colonization and increasing incorporation into Ecuadorian society. He frequently used life histories of individual Shuar people as a way to understand the political conditions facing the community. He was also known for his application of reflexive and autoethnographic methods when writing about experiences of intimacy and vulnerability in ethnographic fieldwork. In his last work, he used the psychological theory of Jacques Lacan to analyze the ways in which the Shuar use the hallucinogen Ayahuasca.

Rubenstein was the author of Alejandro Tsakimp: A Shuar Healer in the Margins of History (2002), based on his life history interviews with a Shuar shaman, and co-editor with Kathleen S. Fine-Dare of Border Crossings: Transnational Americanist Anthropology (2009). He was also a Wikipedia editor and administrator, under the username Slrubenstein. Since registering his account in December 2001 he made more than 30,000 edits to articles about anthropology and related fields.

In 2012, Rubenstein died unexpectedly at his home in Liverpool at the age of 49.

== Education and career ==
Rubenstein was born in Brooklyn, New York, the son of Ken and Fran Rubenstein. He graduated from The Wheatley School in Old Westbury, New York in 1980. He received BA degrees in anthropology from Columbia University and in philosophy from the Jewish Theological Seminary of America, both in 1984 as part of a joint program, and an MA in anthropology from Columbia in 1986. He obtained his PhD in anthropology in 1995, also from Columbia, where he studied with Michael Taussig, Eric Wolf, Morton Fried, Robert Murphy and Libbet Crandon-Malamud. The title of his thesis was "Death in a Distant Place: The Politics of Shuar Shamans of the Ecuadorian Amazon," based on fieldwork in the Morona-Santiago Province in Ecuador between 1988 and 1992. His approach to studying the indigenous cultures of South America was highly influenced by Taussig's work.

Between 1993 and 1996, Rubenstein taught at the City University of New York, the New York School for Social Research, and Georgetown University, before obtaining a Mellon postdoctoral fellowship at Cornell University's Society for the Humanities (1996–1997). Prior to his appointment as Reader in Latin American Anthropology at the University of Liverpool in 2006, he taught for eight years at Ohio University as assistant then associate professor (1997–2005).

He was actively involved in SALSA, the Society for the Anthropology of Lowland South America, serving on the executive board, as editor of book reviews for its journal, Tipití, and as a conference organizer. In 2008, he was appointed to the editorial board of the journal Cultural Anthropology. In 2008–2009 he was a fellow of the National Humanities Center. SALSA named the Steven Lee Rubenstein memorial Scholarship in his honor.

== Selected publications ==
Books

- with Fine-Dare, Kathleen S. (eds) (2009) Border Crossings: Transnational Americanist Anthropology. University of Nebraska Press.
- (2002) Alejandro Tsakimp: A Shuar Healer in the Margins of History. University of Nebraska Press.

Book chapters

- (2009) "Crossing Boundaries with Shrunken Heads", in Fine-Dare and Rubenstein, op. cit.
- with Fine-Dare, Kathleen S. (2009) "The Lizard's Dream," in Fine-Dare and Rubenstein, op. cit.
- (2006) "A Head for Adventure", in Vivanco, Luis A. and Gordon, Robert A. (eds). Tarzan Was An Eco-Tourist ... and Other Tales in the Anthropology of Adventure. Berghahn Books.

Papers

- (February 2012) Rubenstein, Steven Lee (2012). "On the importance of visions among the Amazonian Shuar". Current Anthropology. 53 (1): 39–79. doi:10.1086/663830. JSTOR 10.1086/663830. S2CID 144980353.
- (March–June 2008) Rubenstein, Steven L. (2008). "Comment: Interrogating the neo-pluralist orthodoxy in American anthropology". Dialectical Anthropology. 32 (1–2): 97–106. doi:10.1007/s10624-008-9052-y. JSTOR 29790812. S2CID 144039015.
- (2007) Rubenstein, Steven LEE (2007). "Circulation, accumulation, and the power of Shuar shrunken heads". Cultural Anthropology. 22 (3): 357–399. doi:10.1525/can.2007.22.3.357.
- (2005) "La conversión de los Shuar" (PDF). Íconos: Revista de Sciencias Sociales (in French). 22: 27–48.
- (Summer 2004) Rubenstein, Steven L. (2004). "Fieldwork and the erotic economy on the colonial frontier". Signs: Journal of Women in Culture and Society. 29 (4): 1041–1071. doi:10.1086/382629. JSTOR 10.1086/382629. S2CID 144458172. Downloadable copy.
- (2004) Rubenstein, Steven L. (December 2004). "Steps to a political ecology of Amazonia". Tipití: Journal of the Society for the Anthropology of Lowland South America. 2 (2) 2. Digital Commons. doi:10.70845/2572-3626.1013. Pdf.
- (June 2004) Rubenstein, Steven L. (2004). "Shuar migrants and shrunken heads face to face in a New York museum". Anthropology Today. 20 (3): 15–18. doi:10.1111/j.0268-540X.2004.00268.x.
- (2001) Rubenstein, Steven (2001). "Colonialism, the Shuar Federation, and the Ecuadorian state". Environment and Planning D: Society and Space. 19 (3): 263–293. Bibcode:2001EnPlD..19..263R. doi:10.1068/d236t. S2CID 146787349. Downloadable copy.
- (2001) "Zen Marxism revisited: Tierney and false dualisms in anthropology". Anthropology News. 41 (2). AnthroNiche of Douglas W. Hume: 7–8. Archived from the original on February 22, 2012.
- (March 1993) Rubenstein, Steven Lee (2008). "Chain marriage among the Shuar". The Latin American Anthropology Review. 5 (1): 3–9. doi:10.1525/jlca.1993.5.1.3.
- (1986) "Understanding magic". Faces. Cobblestone Press. Archived from the original on May 17, 2015.

== See also ==
- List of Wikipedia people
