= Attack of the Smart Pies =

Book by Larry Gonick

- Author: Larry Gonick
- Publisher: Cricket Books
- Publication date: June 1, 2004
- ISBN: 978-0-812-62689-6

Attack of the Smart Pies (2005) is a novel written by Larry Gonick. It is the first novel written about the characters in the comic strip Kokopelli & Company, which has appeared since 1997 in Muse magazine.

== Plot summary ==
Emma is an orphaned child who has been treated badly by her stepfather, Darien Drinkwater. She runs away after Darien threatens to do something nasty to her. She ends up in Kokonino County, where the helpful Muses live. Feather, the Muse of Plants, uses intelligent air to watch Darien Drinkwater, and Emma watches him take the two pieces of paper her parents had left for her. After much work, Emma is able to write down what is written on the two pieces of paper. The text, however, seems to be some sort of secret code, so Emma searches for someone who can help her crack the code. Unfortunately, she arrived in the middle of the great Pie War between Kokopelli and Urania, two Muses who get along very badly. She ends up helping Urania because Urania is proficient in maths. In the end, it is Bo, the Muse of Factoids, who saves the day by recognizing the "code" as the number to a safe deposit box in a bank. Emma then finds a grown-up cousin to live with while Darien Drinkwater is arrested for various crimes performed throughout the book.

== Reception ==
A piece appearing in April 2005 in Kirkus Reviews praised the book's "zany premise and equally off-the-wall plot", but doubted its chances at mass appeal, noting that "the New Muses may keep their current fans amused, but they’re unlikely to draw many new ones with this offbeat episode." Heather Ver Voort of the School Library Journal stated: "The cartoonlike spot illustrations will appeal to children, including reluctant readers. The book has a lot to offer, and the characters have distinct personalities." The Horn Book Magazine called it a "muddle from start to finish" and an "excruciating exercise in forced whimsy".
