= Odyssey (children's magazine) =

American children's magazine (1979–2015)

- Categories: Children's magazine
- Founder: Richard Berry
- Founded: 1979
- Final issue: 2015
- Company: Carus Publishing Company
- Country: United States
- Based in: Peterborough, New Hampshire
- Language: English
- ISSN: 0163-0946

Odyssey was a monthly science magazine for children ages 9–14, created by Richard Berry, editor of Astronomy. The magazine was published between 1979 and 2015. It was based in Peterborough, New Hampshire. The magazine was also headquartered in Milwaukee, Wisconsin.

== History and profile ==
Odyssey debuted in 1979 with Nancy Mack as its founding editor and was published by AstroMedia Corp until it was acquired by Kalmbach Publishing. Kalmbach published the magazine from 1985 to 1991. Odyssey focused on astronomy and featured a robot named Ulysses 4-11 as its mascot. Ulysses would answer questions from readers and had his own comic, "The Adventures of Ulysses", written by Bruce Algozin and Russ Chong, at the end of each issue until 1989. A single panel comic, "Springboard", written by John Leatherman, was also featured in the magazine.

In 1991, Kalmbach sold Odyssey to Cobblestone Publishing, publisher of Cobblestone, which in turn was sold to Carus Publishing in 2010. Carus continued publication as part of its Cricket Magazine Group. The magazine expanded its focus to science in general and Ulysses was discontinued as a mascot. Reader questions were answered by microbiologist Cy Borg, and the magazine also featured a short fiction section until 2015.

In April 2015, Odyssey merged with another Cricket Group magazine Muse, and subscribers now receive editions of Muse.

== Other features ==
Some other features included tracking the discoveries from the Voyager 1 and Voyager 2 space probes as they flew by planets in the Solar System in the 1980s.

There was also a drawing contest that challenged children to draw space scenes which would then be shown in different issues of the magazine.
