= Digs =

Digs or DIGS my refer to:

- Archaeological digs
- Derby Independent Grammar School
- JR Digs, Canadian television personality
- Deputy inspector generals of police (DIGs)
- colloquial British term for lodgings

== See also ==
- Dig (disambiguation)
