= Digging for Gold =

Digging for Gold or Digging For Gold may refer to:

- Digging for Gold, a 1927 short film
- Digging for Gold, an episode of the Under the Umbrella Tree series
- Digging for Gold, a song of the Mutiny band
- Digging For Gold, an episode of the Auto-B-Good series
- Digging for Gold, an episode of the 2010 Doctors series
- Digging for Gold, an episode of the Operation Gold Rush with Dan Snow series
- Digging for Gold, an episode of the Radio Free America series
- Digging for Gold, an episode of the Pocket.Watch: Love, Diana series
- Digging For Gold, an episode of the Where There's a Will, There's a Wake series

== See also ==
- Digging (disambiguation)
