= The Dig =

The Dig may refer to:

- The Dig (band), American rock band
- The Dig (2018 film), an Irish drama film
- The Dig (2021 film), a British drama film
- "The Dig" (House), a 2011 episode of House
- The Dig (novel), a 2007 novel by John Preston
- The Dig (video game), a 1995 video game by LucasArts
- The Dig (podcast), podcast published by Jacobin magazine

== See also ==
- Dig (disambiguation)
