= Kalmbach Media =

United States book and magazine publisher

- Status: Dissolved
- Founded: 1934
- Founder: Al C. Kalmbach
- Defunct: November 14, 2024; 21 months ago
- Successor: Firecrown Media
- Country of origin: United States
- Publication types: Books, magazines
- Nonfiction topics: Hobbies, trains, crafts, model railroading, autos, drones, astronomy, snowmobiles.
- Revenue: subscriptions
- Official website: kalmbach.com (defunct)

Kalmbach Media (formerly Kalmbach Publishing Co.) was an American publisher of books and magazines, many of them railroad-related, located in Waukesha, Wisconsin.

== History ==
The company's first publication was The Model Railroader, which began publication in the summer of 1933 at 545 S. 84th Street in Milwaukee (now site of a car wash), with a cover date of January 1934. A press release announcing the magazine appeared in August 1933, but did not receive much interest.

In 1940, business was good enough for Kalmbach to launch another magazine about railroads in general with the simple title of Trains Magazine. From its first issue dated November 1940, it grew quickly from an initial circulation of just over 5,000.

Kalmbach became exclusively a publisher when it discontinued its printing operations in 1973, opting to contract production from other printers, that spot (on the 3rd floor) would later be home to the Milwaukee Racine & Troy model railroad, which would be torn down in 1989

In 1985, Kalmbach purchased AstroMedia Corporation, adding its four magazines: Astronomy, Deep Sky, the children's science magazine Odyssey and Telescope Making.

In 1989, they moved out of their office at 1027 N. 7th Street of Milwaukee (now part of Milwaukee Area Technical College and Milwaukee PBS) to their location in Waukesha. Their first location was at 545 S. 84th Street is now a car wash.

Kalmbach began publishing its annual Great Model Railroads in November 1990.

In 1991, Kalmbach purchased Greenberg Publishing of Sykesville, Maryland. Also included in the purchase was Greenberg Shows, which sponsored nearly two dozen combined model railroad and doll house shows on the East Coast. Intending to focus on the adult hobby and leisure market, Kalmbach sold the publication rights of the children's science magazine Odyssey to Cobblestone Publishing of Peterborough, New Hampshire in September 1991.

In January 1992, Kalmbach began publishing Earth magazine.

Kalmbach purchased Discover Media, publisher of the science magazine Discover, in August 2010.

Gerald B. Boettcher, the company's president, retired in June 2012. Charles R. Croft became the new president.

In 2016 Kalmbach acquired Rather Dashing Games, a board game company based near Lexington, Kentucky. In 2018 the company sold the board game company to Loren and Heather Coleman, owners of game publisher Catalyst Game Labs. According to the Rather Dashing Games website, the company is now a division of Catalyst Game Labs.

In 2017 the company hired digital media veteran Dan Hickey as its sixth chief executive officer. Hickey was the first Kalmbach leader hired from outside the company in its 84-year history. The company was renamed Kalmbach Media in 2018.

== Sale to Firecrown and dissolution ==
On May 1, 2024, Kalmbach Media announced the sale of several titles to Firecrown Media, including Trains, Model Railroader, Classic Toy Trains, Classic Trains, Garden Railways, and the trains.com web site. Also included in the sale is Astronomy magazine, FineScale Modeler, the Kalmbach Books division, and related e-commerce sites. The sale left Kalmbach with Discover magazine as its sole remaining publication; Kalmbach later sold Discover to LabX Media Group.

On July 25, 2024, Kalmbach Media sold their former headquarter building to Silgan Containers for $6.5 million. The corporate entity was dissolved on November 14, 2024.

== Magazines ==
- Airliners International (ceased publication)
- American Snowmobiler (sold to Harris Publishing 2019)
- Art Jewelry (ceased publication)
- Astronomy (sold to Firecrown Media 2024)
- Bead & Button (ceased publication after October 2020 issue)
- BeadStyle (ceased publication)
- Birder's World
- BirdWatching (sold to Madavor Media in 2012)
- Car Modeler (ceased publication)
- Classic Toy Trains Magazine (sold to Firecrown Media 2024)
- Classic Trains Magazine (sold to Firecrown Media 2024)
- Collecting Toys (ceased publication)
- Discover (sold to LabX Media 2024)
- Dollhouse Miniatures (formerly Nutshell News)
- Drone360 (ceased publication)
- Earth
- FineScale Modeler (sold to Firecrown Media 2024)
- Garden Railways (ceased publication)
- HO Model Trains (ceased publication)
- Make It Mine (ceased publication)
- Model Railroader (its first periodical, sold to Firecrown Media 2024)
- Model Retailer (ceased publication)
- Model Trains (ceased publication)
- Scale Auto (ceased publication)
- Ships & Sailing (ceased publication)
- The Writer (sold to Madavor Media in 2012)
- Trains (its second periodical, sold to Firecrown Media 2024)

The company also produces some annual publications.

In addition, it publishes numerous books, including the Tourist Trains Guidebook. An illustrated compendium of more than 450 tourist railroads, dinner trains, and rail museums in the U.S. and Canada, the 300-page guidebook's 2009 edition provides reviews by Trains magazine staff and contributors. It was the original publisher of Jim Scribbins' The Hiawatha Story in 1970.

== See also ==
- List of English language book publishing companies
