= Larry Gonick =

American cartoonist (born 1946)

Larry Gonick (born August 24, 1946) is an American cartoonist best known for The Cartoon History of the Universe, a history of the world in comic book form, which he published in installments from 1977 to 2009. He has also written The Cartoon History of the United States, and he has adapted the format for a series of co-written guidebooks on other subjects, beginning with The Cartoon Guide to Genetics in 1983. The diversity of his interests, and the success with which his books have met, have together earned Gonick the distinction of being "the most well-known and respected of cartoonists who have applied their craft to unravelling the mysteries of science".

== Early life ==
Gonick was born in August 24, 1946, in San Francisco, California. He studied mathematics at Harvard University, receiving his bachelor's degree in 1967 and his master's degree in 1969. He currently lives in San Francisco, California.

== Comic strips and cartoons ==
From 1990 to 1997, Gonick penned a bimonthly "Science Classics" cartoon for the science magazine Discover. Each two-page comic discussed a recent scientific development, often one in interdisciplinary research.

During the 1994-95 academic year, Gonick was a Knight Science Journalism Fellow at MIT.

In 1997, his 14-issue series, Candide in China, published on the World Wide Web, described Chinese inventions.

From 1997 until the comic's cancellation in 2015, he wrote the Kokopelli & Company comic that appeared in the magazine Muse, as well as the spinoff novel Attack of the Smart Pies in 2005. The comic's characters also appeared in the margins of the magazine, which was inconsistently also his writing.

He drew the satirical, anti-corporate comic Commoners for Common Ground and later explained:

Feeling alternately mournful and enraged about the shameless expropriation of public space, public enterprise, publicly held goods like the atmosphere, oceans, and rivers, not to mention roads, parks, sidewalks, genomes, and the broadcast spectrum—indeed the very idea of the common good—I decided to do something about it! Well, say something, anyway.

Between 2009 and 2011 Gonick drew a humorous webcomic entitled Raw Materials that deals with technology and business matters, especially database administration.

== Awards ==
In 1999, Gonick was awarded the Inkpot Award.

== Bibliography ==
- Blood from a Stone: A Cartoon Guide to Tax Reform (with Steve Atlas), (1972 (?), New York Public Interest Research Group)
- The Cartoon Guide to Computer Science (1983, Barnes & Noble; 1991 reprinted as The Cartoon Guide to the Computer, Collins, ISBN 0-06-273097-5)
- The Cartoon Guide to Genetics (with Mark Wheelis) (1983, Barnes & Noble; 1991 revised edition, Collins, ISBN 0-06-273099-1)
- The Cartoon Guide to U.S. History: 1865-Now (1987, Barnes & Noble; 1991 revised edition as The Cartoon History of the United States, Collins, ISBN 0-06-273098-3)
- Neo-Babelonia: A serious study in contemporary confusion (1989, Veen/BSO, ISBN 978-9020419290)
- The Cartoon History of the Universe - From the Big Bang to Alexander the Great (Volumes 1-7) (1990, Doubleday, ISBN 0-385-26520-4)
- The Cartoon Guide to Physics (with Art Huffman) (1991, Harper Perennial; 1992 reprint edition, Collins, ISBN 0-06-273100-9)
- The Cartoon Guide to (non)Communication (1993 reprint edition, Collins, ISBN 0-06-273217-X)
- The Cartoon Guide to Statistics (with Woollcott Smith) (1994, Collins, ISBN 0-06-273102-5)
- The Cartoon History of the Universe II - From the Springtime of China to the Fall of Rome (Volumes 8-13) (1994, Doubleday, ISBN 0-385-42093-5)
- The Cartoon Guide to the Environment (with Alice Outwater) (1996, Collins, ISBN 0-06-273274-9)
- The Cartoon Guide to Sex (with Christine Devault) (1999, Collins, ISBN 0-06-273431-8)
- The Cartoon History of the Universe III - From the Rise of Arabia to the Renaissance (Volumes 14-19) (2002, Doubleday, ISBN 0-393-05184-6)
- Kokopelli and Company in Attack of the Smart Pies (fiction) (2005, Cricket Books, ISBN 0-8126-2740-7)
- The Cartoon Guide to Chemistry (with Craig Criddle) (2005, Collins, ISBN 0-06-093677-0)
- The Cartoon History of the Modern World, Volume 1: From Columbus to the U.S. Constitution (2007, Collins, ISBN 0-06-076004-4)
- The Cartoon History of the Modern World, Volume 2: From the Bastille to Baghdad (2009, Collins, ISBN 0-06-076008-7)
- The Cartoon Guide to Calculus (2011, William Morrow Paperbacks, ISBN 0-06-168909-2)
- The Cartoon Guide to Algebra (2015, William Morrow Paperbacks, ISBN 0-06-220269-3)
- Hypercapitalism: The Modern Economy, Its Values, and How to Change Them (2018, The New Press, ISBN 1-62-097282-4)
- The Cartoon Guide to Biology (2019, William Morrow Paperbacks, ISBN 978-0-06-239865-9)
- The Cartoon Guide to Geometry (2024, William Morrow Paperbacks)
