= Astronomy (magazine) =

American monthly magazine

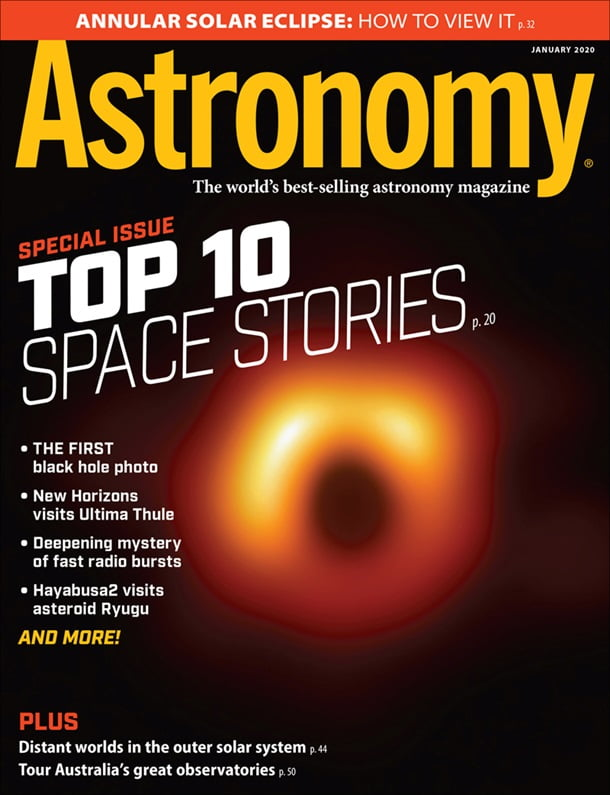
- January 2020 cover of Astronomy
- Editor: David J. Eicher
- Categories: Amateur Astronomy
- Frequency: Monthly
- Circulation: 84,490
- Publisher: Kevin Keefe
- First issue: August 1973; 52 years ago
- Company: Firecrown Media
- Country: United States
- Based in: Brookfield, Wisconsin, U.S.
- Language: English
- Website: astronomy.com
- ISSN: 0091-6358

Astronomy is a monthly American magazine about astronomy. Targeting amateur astronomers, it contains columns on sky viewing, reader-submitted astrophotographs, and articles on astronomy and astrophysics for general readers.

== History ==
Astronomy is a magazine about the science and hobby of astronomy. Based near Milwaukee in Brookfield, Wisconsin, it was produced by Kalmbach Publishing. Astronomy’s readers include those interested in astronomy and those who want to know about sky events, observing techniques, astrophotography, and amateur astronomy in general.

Astronomy was founded in 1973 by Stephen A. Walther, a graduate of the University of Wisconsin–Stevens Point and amateur astronomer. The first issue, August 1973, consisted of 48 pages with five feature articles and information about what to see in the sky that month. Issues contained astrophotos and illustrations created by astronomical artists. Walther had worked part time as a planetarium lecturer at the University of Wisconsin–Milwaukee and developed an interest in photographing constellations at an early age. Although even in childhood he was interested to obsession in astronomy, he did so poorly in mathematics that his mother despaired that he would ever be able to earn a living. However he graduated in Journalism from the University of Wisconsin-Stevens Point, and as a senior class project he created a business plan for a magazine for amateur astronomers. With the help of his brother David, he was able to bring the magazine to fruition. He died in 1977.

AstroMedia Corp., the company Walther had founded to publish Astronomy in Milwaukee, brought in Richard Berry as editor. Berry also created the offshoot Odyssey, aimed at young readers, and the specialized Telescope Making. In 1985, Milwaukee hobby publisher Kalmbach bought Astronomy.

In 1992, Richard Berry left the magazine and Robert Burnham took over as chief editor. Kalmbach discontinued Deep Sky and Telescope Making magazines and sold Odyssey. In 1996 Bonnie Gordon, now a professor at Central Arizona College, assumed the editorship. David J. Eicher, the creator of "Deep Sky," became chief editor in 2002.

The Astronomy staff also produces other publications. These have included Explore the Universe; Beginner’s Guide to Astronomy; Origin and Fate of the Universe; Mars: Explore the Red Planet's Past, Present, and Future; Atlas of the Stars; Cosmos; and 50 Greatest Mysteries of the Universe. There also was, for a time in the mid-2000s, a Brazilian edition – published by Duetto Editora – called Astronomy Brasil. However, due mainly to low circulation numbers, Duetto ceased its publication in September 2007.

The magazine along with Kalmbach Media's railroad interest magazines, was sold to Firecrown Media in 2024.

== Articles and columns ==
Astronomy publishes articles about the hobby and science of astronomy. Generally, the front half of the magazine reports on professional science, while the back half of the magazine presents items of interest to hobbyists. Science articles cover such topics as cosmology, space exploration, exobiology, research conducted by professional-class observatories, and individual professional astronomers. Each issue of Astronomy contains a foldout star map showing the evening sky for the current month and the positions of planets, and some comets.

The magazine has had a number of regular columnists for many years. They have included science writer Bob Berman, who wrote a column called “Bob Berman’s Strange Universe” between January 1992 and February 2024. Stephen James O'Meara wrote “Stephen James O’Meara’s Secret Sky”, which covered observing tips and stories relating to deep-sky objects, planets, and comets from March 2007 until May 2025. Glenn Chaple wrote "Glenn Chaple’s Observing Basics", a beginner's column between January 2003 and December 2022. Phil Harrington wrote "Phil Harrington’s Binocular Universe", about observing with binoculars from June 2005 to May 2009 and from July 2016 to February 2024. As of February 2026 all four authors are listed as contributing editors. The "Observing Basics" column returned in August 2023 under the authorship of Molly Wakeling. "Telescope Insider" interviews people who are a part of the telescope-manufacturing industry.

In each issue of Astronomy magazine, readers will find star and planet charts, telescope observing tips and techniques, and advice on taking photography of the night sky. The magazine also publishes reader-submitted photos in a gallery, lists astronomy-related events, letters from readers, news, and announcements of new products.

Astronomy may include special sections bound into the magazine, such as booklets or posters. Recent examples have included a Messier Catalog booklet, poster showing comet C/2006 P1 (McNaught) and historical comets, a Skyguide listing upcoming sky events, a Telescope Buyer's Guide; a poster titled "Atlas of Extrasolar Planets"; and a poster showing the life cycles of stars.

== Popularity ==
Astronomy is the largest circulation astronomy magazine, with monthly circulation of 84,490. The majority of its readers are in the United States, but it is also circulated in Canada and internationally.

Its major competitor is Sky & Telescope magazine with a total circulation of 62,234 (2020).

== See also ==
- Amateur astronomy
- Amateur telescope making
