= Théophile Voirol =

Swiss-born French general

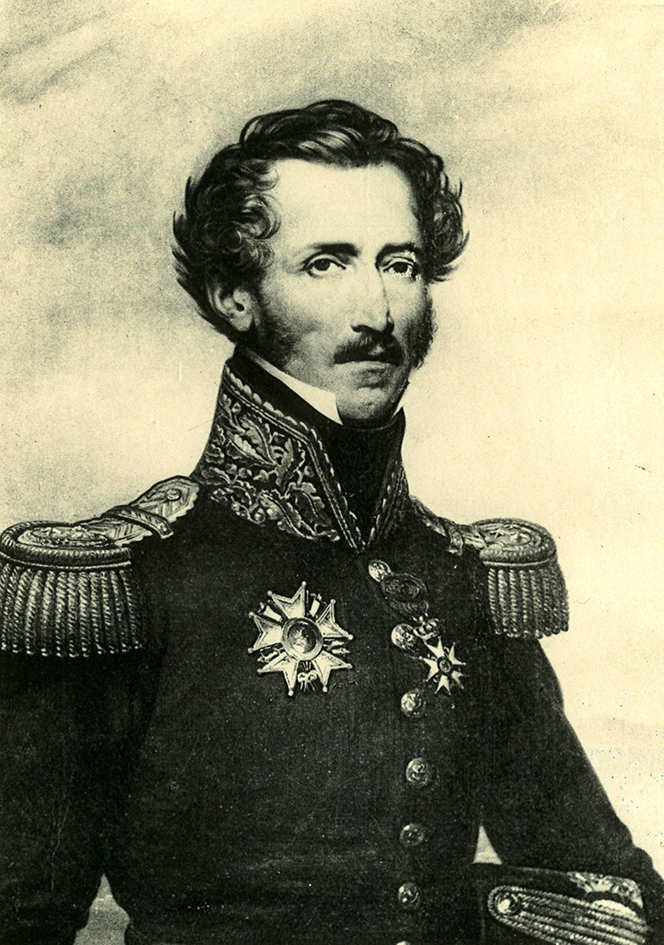
- Théophile Voirol (1781–1853).

Governor of Algeria
- In office 29 April 1833 – 27 July 1834
- Preceded by: Anne Jean Marie René Savary
- Succeeded by: Jean-Baptiste Drouet, Comte d'Erlon

Personal details
- Born: September 3, 1781 Tavannes, Canton of Bern, Old Swiss Confederacy
- Died: 15 September 1853 (aged 72) Besançon, Doubs, Second French Empire
- Awards: Grand Officer of the Legion of Honour

Military service
- Allegiance: French Republican Army
- Years of service: 1799–1848
- Rank: General

Théophile Voirol (September 3, 1781, Tavannes, Canton of Bern – September 15, 1853 in Besançon, Doubs) was a Swiss general in the French Republican Army, who later became a French nobleman and Governor of Algeria. He was also a member of the Chamber of Peers from 1839 until its abolishment in 1848.

He was born into a rich family in Tavannes in the Jura Mountains region of the Canton of Bern, the son of Justice David Voirol and Marianne Ruedolf. At 12, he was sent to Basel to enter an apprenticeship as a merchant, but he disliked that occupation.

When the French Revolution erupted in 1789, the French Republic sent its army into the territory of the Bishop of Basel in 1792. The country was annexed to France, and many young men were conscripted to fill the ranks, among them Théophile's older brother. His family was in despair, but 17-year-old Théophile quickly offered himself as a substitute. This was the beginning of a long and brilliant career in the French Army, serving under all the subsequent regimes, including the Consulate, the Napoleonic Empire, the Restoration, and the July Monarchy.

He retired to Besançon in 1848, where he died.
