= The Cartoon History of the Universe =

Comic book series about the history of the world

The Cartoon History of the Universe : From the Big Bang to Alexander the Great
- Gonick's authorial voice is represented by the Professor, pictured on the cover of The Cartoon History of the Universe – From the Big Bang to Alexander the Great.
- Author: Larry Gonick
- Language: English
- Subject: History
- Genre: non-fiction
- Publisher: Broadway Books
- Publication date: 1990
- Publication place: United States
- Pages: 358
- ISBN: 0-385-26520-4
- OCLC: 49747633
- Dewey Decimal: 902/.07 20
- LC Class: D21.1 .G66 1990
- Followed by: The Cartoon History of the Universe II

The Cartoon History of the Universe is a book series about the history of the world. It is written and illustrated by American cartoonist, professor, and mathematician Larry Gonick, who started the project in 1978. Each book in the series explains a period of world history in a loosely chronological order. They draw upon evolutionary biology and other sciences, and provide citations to sources.

Though originally published as a comic book series, the series is now published in trade paperback volumes of several hundred pages each. The final two volumes, published in 2007 and 2009, bring the narrative up to 2008 and are named The Cartoon History of the Modern World, volumes one and two. The books have been translated into many languages, including Portuguese, Greek, Czech and Polish.

== Publication history ==
San Francisco-based underground comix publisher Rip Off Press began publishing The Cartoon History of the Universe in 1978, with five volumes being published by 1980.

Rip Off Press published 9 issues from 1978 to 1992; the first collected edition was published by Doubleday in 1990.

While seeking a book publisher, Gonick received early support from Jacqueline Kennedy Onassis, who worked as an editor at Doubleday and championed The Cartoon History of the Universe's publication by the company.

== Illustration style ==
The Cartoon History is illustrated in a black-and-white cartoon style, other than the coloured covers. Gonick occasionally uses crosshatching and other realistic drawing techniques, but he primarily draws with a lively brush-and-ink squiggle. His drawings resemble Bill Watterson's Calvin and Hobbes, Walt Kelly's Pogo, and René Goscinny and Albert Uderzo's Astérix. Occasionally, as in the sequences on India in the second book, he mimics Gilbert Shelton's style from The Fabulous Furry Freak Brothers.

His tribute to Asterix is explicit. When Gauls are depicted, not only do they often resemble Goscinny and Uderzo's characters Asterix and Obelix, but when Gonick treats the Gallic invasion of Italy (390 – 387 BCE), the characters, along with Vitalstatistix, appear unmistakably (Vitalstatistix is transported on a shield, Asterix pummels a Roman soldier, etc.); and as they trudge off into the sunset, the speech balloon reads "Come on, Asterix! Let's get our own comic book".

== Narrative framework ==
Each volume or chapter begins with a one- or two-panel introduction. An Einstein-like Professor (representing Gonick's authorial voice) prepares to travel in his time machine to whatever place or era the chapter is about. The Professor reads a passage from a historical book, which activates the "time machine", a literary device. For example, the Professor reads a book about dinosaurs to introduce Volume 1 about prehistory, and Volume 4 draws from "part of the Old Testament".

He reads from Hans Zinsser's Rats, Lice and History before Volume 19 about the Black Death. This introduction provides a bridge to the action, the main narrative of each chapter.

== Narrative style and tone ==
=== Point of view ===
Any history book has a point of view, and Larry Gonick's might best be described as "humanist", but it is not written in the style of a didactic textbook. Instead, Gonick fleshes out history into a long yarn, injecting characterization into historical personages, continually reporting gory anecdotes, and focusing on quirky details—all backed up by research—to enliven his subject. He reports both the greatness of human achievement and acknowledges humanity's savagery.

Excerpt from The Cartoon History of the Universe II. Note the antic characterization of Alexander the Great and Gonick's use of black ink.

In addition to being a chronological history, The Cartoon History helps readers understand historical cause and effect—how the past relates to the present. It explains the motivations behind human beings' discoveries, inventions, explorations, wars, triumphs, and mistakes. Gonick's editorial aim seeks to do justice to every point of view.

=== Humor ===
Gonick consistently uses elements of satire to find the most humor in every situation. For example, one cartoon panel depicts the barbarism of a group of Huns who had elephants herded off a cliff for their sadistic enjoyment. One Hun exclaims with an oafish grin, "My emotions are valid!"—juxtaposing the Hun's brutal barbarism with an anachronistic, post-modern view of his own cruelty [3].

Also noteworthy is Gonick's use of caricature. For example, he depicts the weaselly Robert Guiscard, the 11th-century Norman adventurer, as an anthropomorphic weasel, an allusion to Guiscard's name and cunning nature, and depicts Babur, the 16th-century founder of the Mughal Empire with buckteeth (an allusion to the theory that the conqueror's name means "beaver").

== Unorthodox citations ==
Consistently enthusiastic in tone, for the first five volumes Gonick uses the last page to recommend further reading, in prehistory, archaeology and history. But rather than relying upon a typeset bibliography, Gonick sustains his specific style and tone as the Professor takes the reader through a cartoon tour of his sources.

Because much of The Cartoon History covers evolutionary science, physics, astronomy, and ancient history, Gonick has referenced original writings on these subjects, rather than relying on secondary sources or anthologies. Some of these primary sources are national epics, cultural writings, or holy scriptures, such as Homer's Iliad, the Rig Veda of India, and the Bible. In this way he prompts his readers also to read the primary sources.

== Antecedents ==
Gonick's work is not the first comic history in English: an early series of comic histories was published in Victorian England: Comic History of England (1847–48) and Comic History of Rome (1852), by author Gilbert Abbott à Beckett, illustrator John Leech.

== The series ==
Beginning with its original comic book Volume 1 in 1977, the complete series covers world history through 2008.

1. Gonick, Larry (1990). The Cartoon History of the Universe – From the Big Bang to Alexander the Great (Volumes 1–7). Doubleday. p. 368. ISBN 0-385-26520-4.
2. Gonick, Larry (1994). The Cartoon History of the Universe II – From the Springtime of China to the Fall of Rome (Volumes 8–13). Doubleday. p. 305. ISBN 0-385-42093-5.
3. Gonick, Larry (2002). The Cartoon History of the Universe III – From the Rise of Arabia to the Renaissance (Volumes 14–19). Doubleday. p. 300. ISBN 0-393-32403-6.
4. Gonick, Larry (2006). The Cartoon History of the Modern World – Volume 1: From Columbus to the U.S. Constitution. Collins. pp. 272. ISBN 0-06-076004-4.
5. Gonick, Larry (2009). The Cartoon History of the Modern World – Volume 2: From the Bastille to Baghdad. Collins. p. 272. ISBN 978-0-06-076008-3.
