= Big Boss' Festival =

Open-air Christian music festival

The Big Boss' Festival was an open-air Christian music festival. It is for the Big Boss: God. This festival began with two bands in 1999. Now, more than 4000 people come each year, and more than 14 international bands play on two stages. It takes place in June in Tavannes (Switzerland). There are concerts Friday and Saturday nights and a worship meeting the Sunday.

In 2006, famous bands like Superhero (UK), Rescate (ARG), and Glenn Kaiser (USA) played on the main stage. In 2007, Matt Redman (UK), YFriday (UK), October Light (Bosnia), Danny Fresh (D), Nannup (F), Spear Hit (F), and Gospelchor Gossau (CH) played on the main stage.

After 10 years, the organisation team retired, and the festival was not resumed.
