= Tavannes =

- Municipality
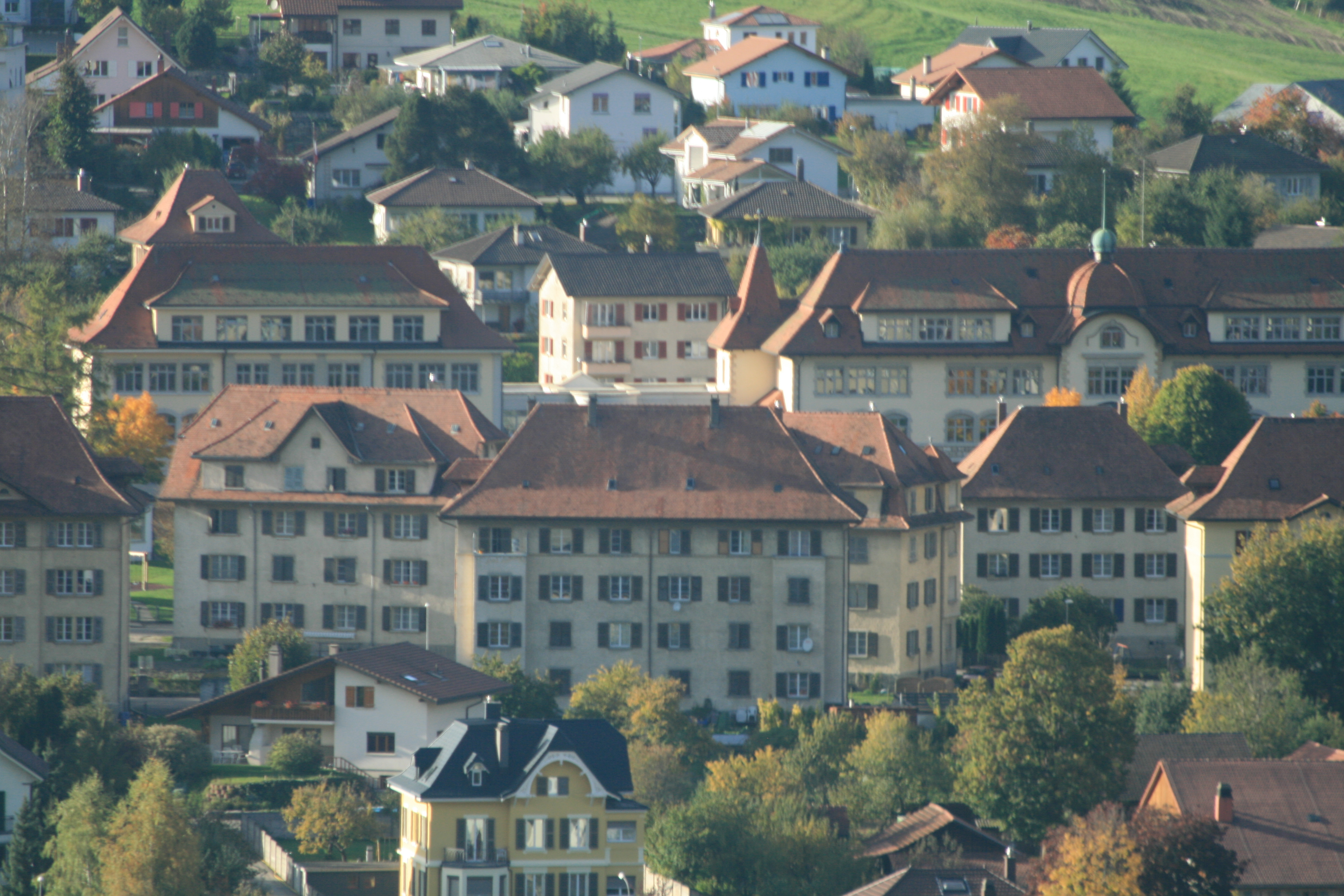
- Tavannes town

- Flag Coat of arms
- Location of Tavannes
- Location within Switzerland Location within Canton of Bern
- Coordinates: 47°13′N 7°12′E
- Country: Switzerland
- Canton: Bern
- District: Jura bernois

Government
  - Executive: Conseil municipal with 7 members
  - Mayor: Maire; Yann Rindlisbacher TA (as of 2026)

Area
  - Total: 14.65 km^{2} (5.66 sq mi)
- Elevation: 754 m (2,474 ft)

Population (Dec 2011)
  - Total: 3,525
  - Density: 240.6/km^{2} (623.2/sq mi)
- Time zone: UTC+01:00 (CET)
  - Summer (DST): UTC+02:00 (CEST)
- Postal code: 2710
- SFOS number: 713
- ISO 3166 code: CH-BE
- Localities: La Tanne
- Surrounded by: Saicourt, Reconvilier, La Heutte, Sonceboz-Sombeval, Corgémont, Tramelan, Mont-Tramelan
- Website: www.tavannes.ch

Tavannes is a municipality in the Jura bernois administrative district in the canton of Bern in Switzerland. It is located in the French-speaking part of the canton in the Jura Mountains.

== History ==
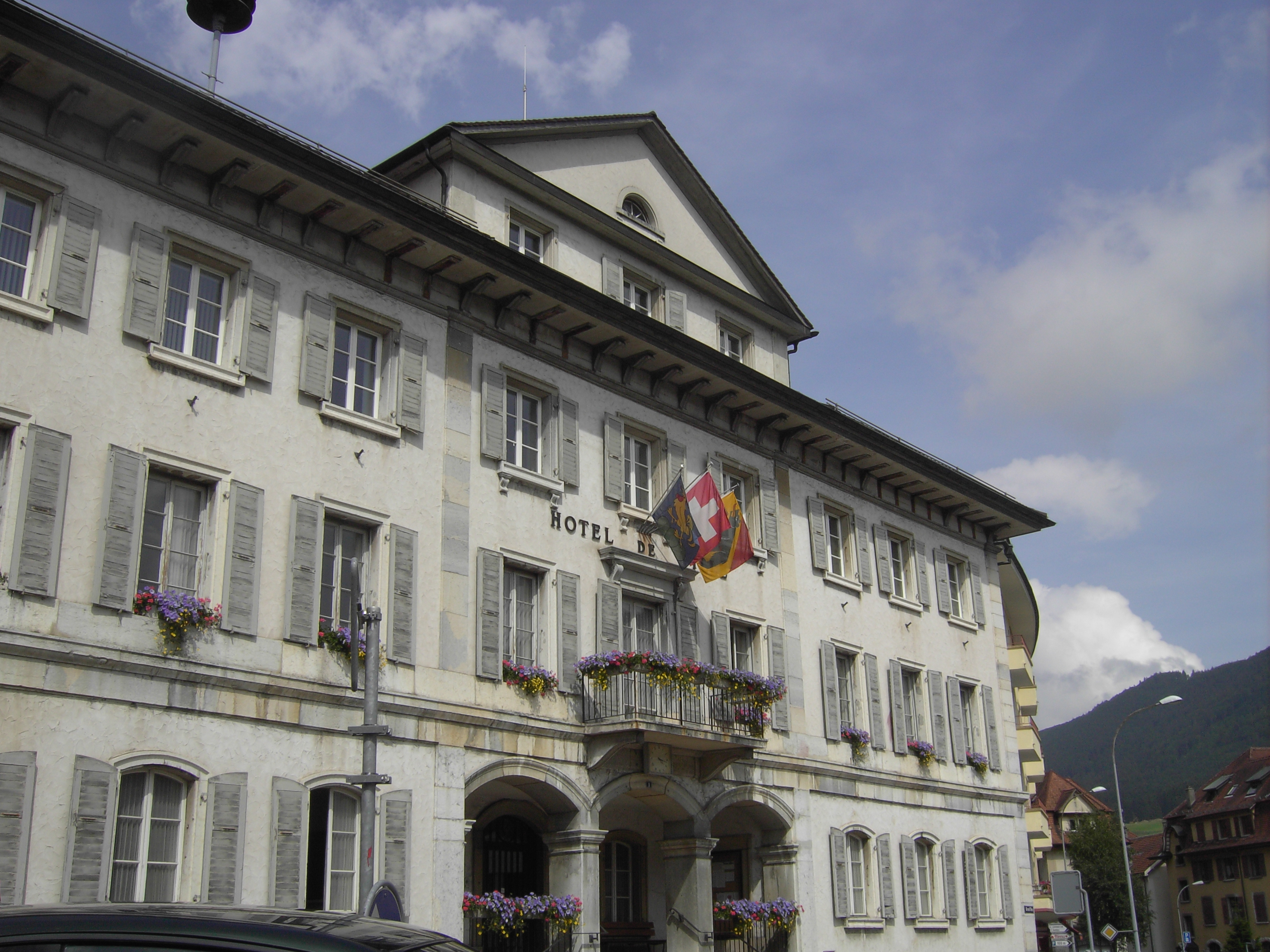
Hotel de Ville

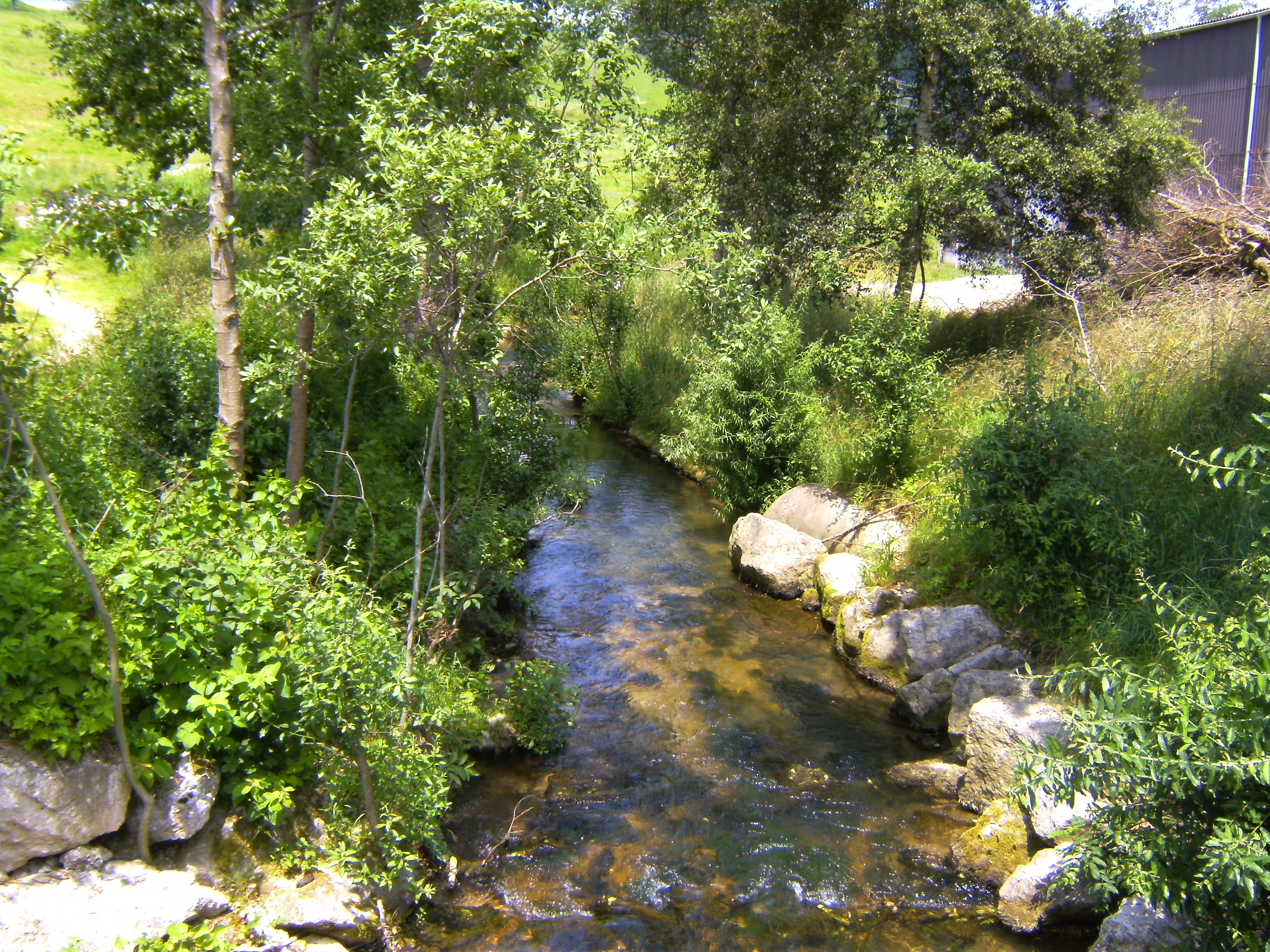
The Birs river near Tavannes

Aerial view from 900 m by Walter Mittelholzer (1930)

The area around Tavannes was traversed by the early inhabitants of the Helvetic plain because of the natural tunnel through the Jura between the valley of the Suze and the valley of the Birse. Under the Emperor Marcus Aurelius, the Romans improved this road between 161 and 169 AD. The Roman administrator left an inscription in the cliff at Pierre-Pertuis to this effect.

Early mills were built along the Birse, utilizing its water as a source of power. Tavannes was one of the earliest inhabited locations in the district. Its name comes from the ancient Germanic words 'Þahs-winja, ancien haut allemand dahs, germanique *þahsu, « blaireau », et gothique vinja, germanique *venjô, « pâturage » [Perrenot]', which means the same as the older German name 'Dachsfelden'.

In the fourth century, as the Roman Empire crumbled, the Burgundians moved into the area around Tavannes. In 630, a monastery was established at Moutier-Grandval, and Tavannes belonged to its possessions.

The first mention of Tavannes (or its Latin equivalent Theisvenna) dates to 866. In 999, King Rudolph III of Burgundy gave the monastery of Moutier-Grandval and all its possessions to the Prince-Bishop of Basel. At Rudolph's death, the district passed into the Holy Roman Empire, to which it belonged for 760 years.

In the spring of 1530, Guillaume Farel preached the Reformation in Tavannes and surrounding areas, with great success. When Tavannes accepted the new faith of the Protestant Reformation, the village church of Saint-Etienne, which was built in 1385, became a Reformed church and remained the only church in Tavannes until the Catholic Church of Christ-Roi was built in 1930.

After the French Revolution, the French Republican Army invaded the district in 1792 and forcibly recruited local soldiers to its ranks. Some were enthusiastic, among them Théophile Voirol, who after rapid promotions, became a general. He later became a French noble and Governor of Algeria.

After the 1797 French victory and the Treaty of Campo Formio, Tavannes became part of the French Département of Mont-Terrible. Three years later, in 1800 it became part of the Département of Haut-Rhin. After Napoleon's defeat and the Congress of Vienna, Tavannes was assigned to the Canton of Bern in 1815. The city government was not established until after the Bishopric of Basel was dissolved in 1797.

The municipality was connected to the growing railroad network in 1874 and by the 1890s was home to several large factories. The establishment of the Tavannes Watch Co. in 1895 turned the village into a major watchmaking center. To house the growing population a number of Swiss chalet and Art Nouveau style houses were built between 1900 and 1930. The Royal Cinema opened in 1918 and turned Tavannes into regional cultural center. The population dropped in 1966 when the Tavannes Watch factory closed and dropped again in 1986 when a major manufacturer closed. The population began to slowly increase with the construction of the A16 motorway.

== Geography ==
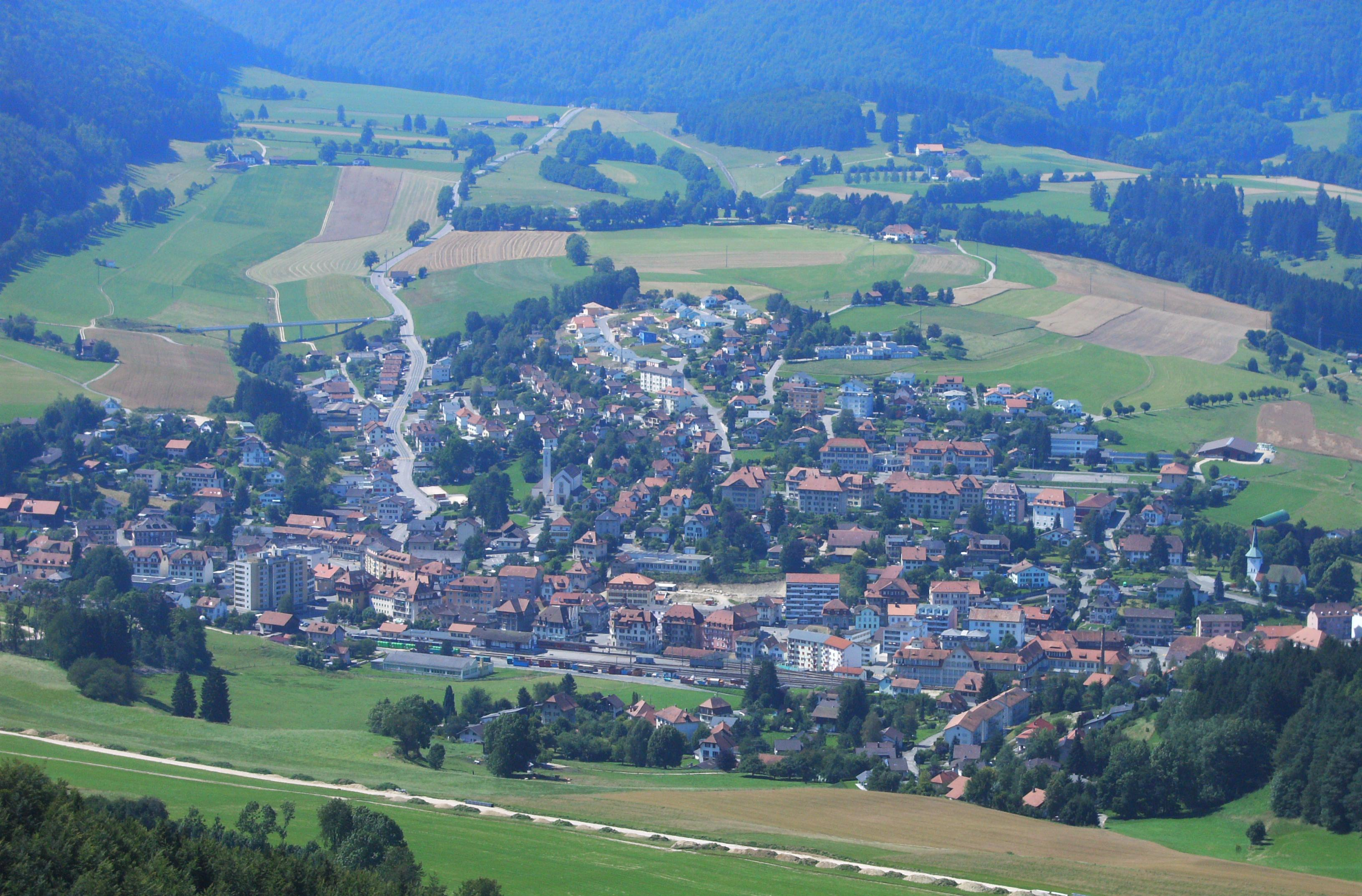
Aerial view of Tavannes town and surroundings

Tavannes has an area of 14.78 km^{2} (5.71 sq mi). As of 2012, a total of 7.12 km^{2} (2.75 mi^{2}) or 48.2% is used for agricultural purposes, while 6.06 km^{2} (2.34 mi^{2}) or 41.1% is forested. Of the rest of the land, 1.61 km^{2} (0.62 mi^{2}) or 10.9% is settled (buildings or roads), 0.01 km^{2} (2.5 acres) or 0.1% is either rivers or lakes.

During the same year, housing and buildings made up 5.8% and transportation infrastructure made up 2.8%. Power and water infrastructure as well as other special developed areas made up 1.2% of the area Out of the forested land, 37.9% of the total land area is heavily forested and 3.2% is covered with orchards or small clusters of trees. Of the agricultural land, 14.0% is used for growing crops and 18.0% is pastures and 16.1% is used for alpine pastures. All the water in the municipality is flowing water.

The municipality is located near the source of the Birs river in the Birs valley.

On 31 December 2009 District de Moutier, the municipality's former district, was dissolved. On the following day, 1 January 2010, it joined the newly created Arrondissement administratif Jura bernois.

== Coat of arms ==
The blazon of the municipal coat of arms is Azure a Rooster hardi Or crested langued and jelloped Gules on a Mount of 3 Coupeaux Vert.

== Demographics ==
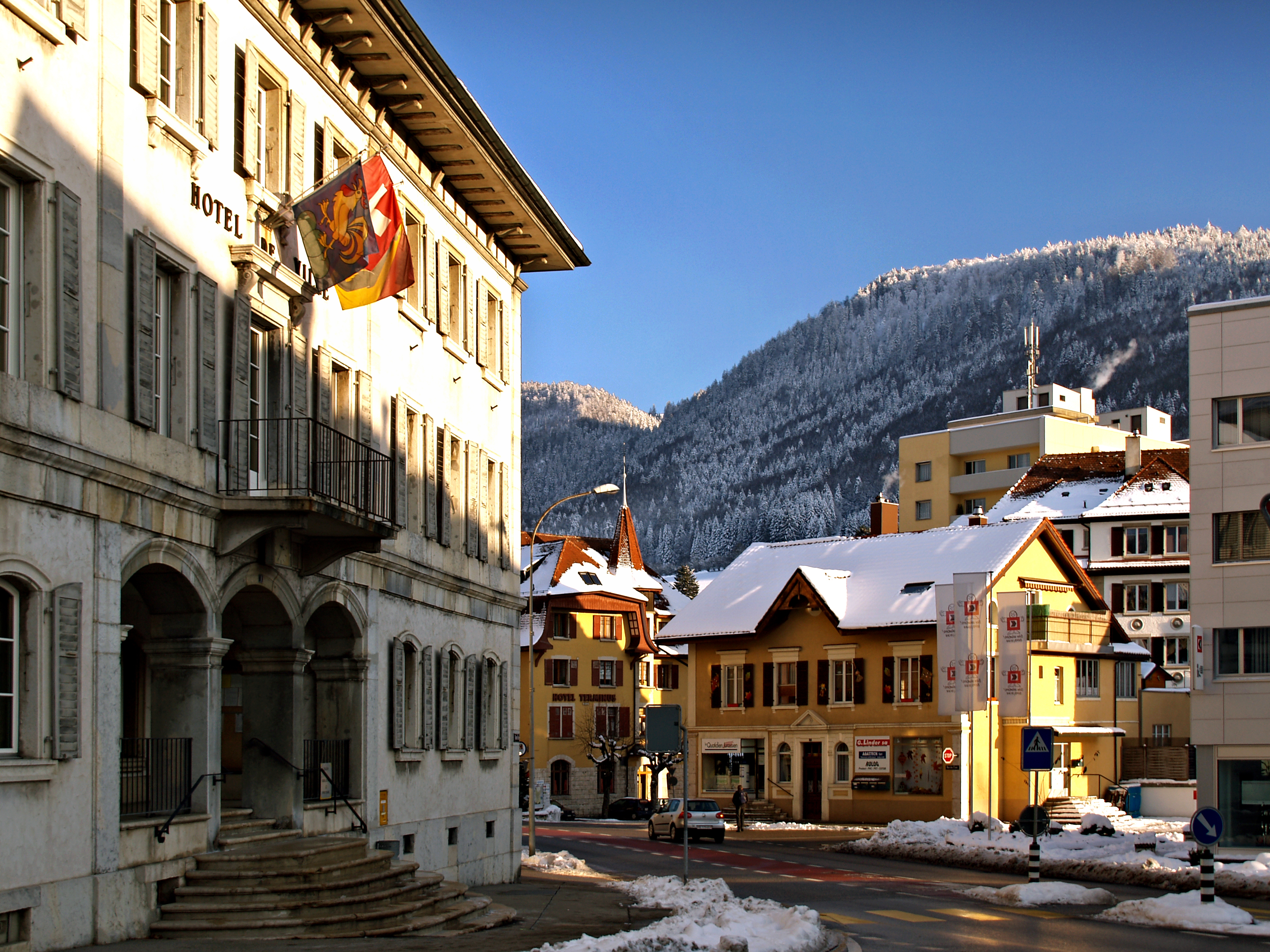
Tavannes town hall and old town center

Tavannes has a population (as of December 2020) of 3,485. As of 2010, 18.7% of the population are resident foreign nationals. Over the last 10 years (2001–2011) the population has changed at a rate of 1.4%. Migration accounted for 1.1%, while births and deaths accounted for 0.2%.

Most of the population (as of 2000) speaks French (2,835 or 84.0%) as their first language, German is the second most common (202 or 6.0%) and Italian is the third (122 or 3.6%).

As of 2008, the population was 49.5% male and 50.5% female. The population was made up of 1,350 Swiss men (38.8% of the population) and 370 (10.6%) non-Swiss men. There were 1,477 Swiss women (42.5%) and 281 (8.1%) non-Swiss women. Of the population in the municipality, 1,041 or about 30.9% were born in Tavannes and lived there in 2000. There were 1,069 or 31.7% who were born in the same canton, while 461 or 13.7% were born somewhere else in Switzerland, and 675 or 20.0% were born outside of Switzerland.

As of 2011, children and teenagers (0–19 years old) make up 22.8% of the population, while adults (20–64 years old) make up 60.6% and seniors (over 64 years old) make up 16.6%.

As of 2000, there were 1,355 people who were single and never married in the municipality. There were 1,631 married individuals, 224 widows or widowers and 163 individuals who are divorced.

As of 2010, there were 612 households that consist of only one person and 91 households with five or more people. In 2000, a total of 1,437 apartments (83.8% of the total) were permanently occupied, while 113 apartments (6.6%) were seasonally occupied and 164 apartments (9.6%) were empty. As of 2010, the construction rate of new housing units was 4.6 new units per 1000 residents. The vacancy rate for the municipality, in 2012, was 1.66%. In 2011, single family homes made up 58.7% of the total housing in the municipality.

The historical population is given in the following chart:

== Heritage sites of national significance ==
The Church of Christ-Roi and the Pierre Pertuis (passage carved into the rock above the Roman road) are listed as Swiss heritage site of national significance. The entire urbanized village of Tavannes is part of the Inventory of Swiss Heritage Sites.

The Church of Christ-Roi was built 1928–30 by Adolphe Guyonnet. The church is a simple, open three aisled church with much of the interior decoration by artists of the St. Luke Society (SSL) which was founded in Switzerland in 1924. The mosaic of the resurrection over the main entrance was done by Gino Severini and Louis Barillet. The main altar mosaic and pulpit mosaic of the Good Shepard were the work of Emilio-Maria Beretta. The stained glass is the work of Alexandre Cingria.

The Pierre Pertuis is a Roman era tunnel through the mountains above Tavannes. The tunnel marked the border between the Raurici and Helvetii territories. A 3rd century inscription by Marcus Dunius Paternus is still visible on the north side of the tunnel.

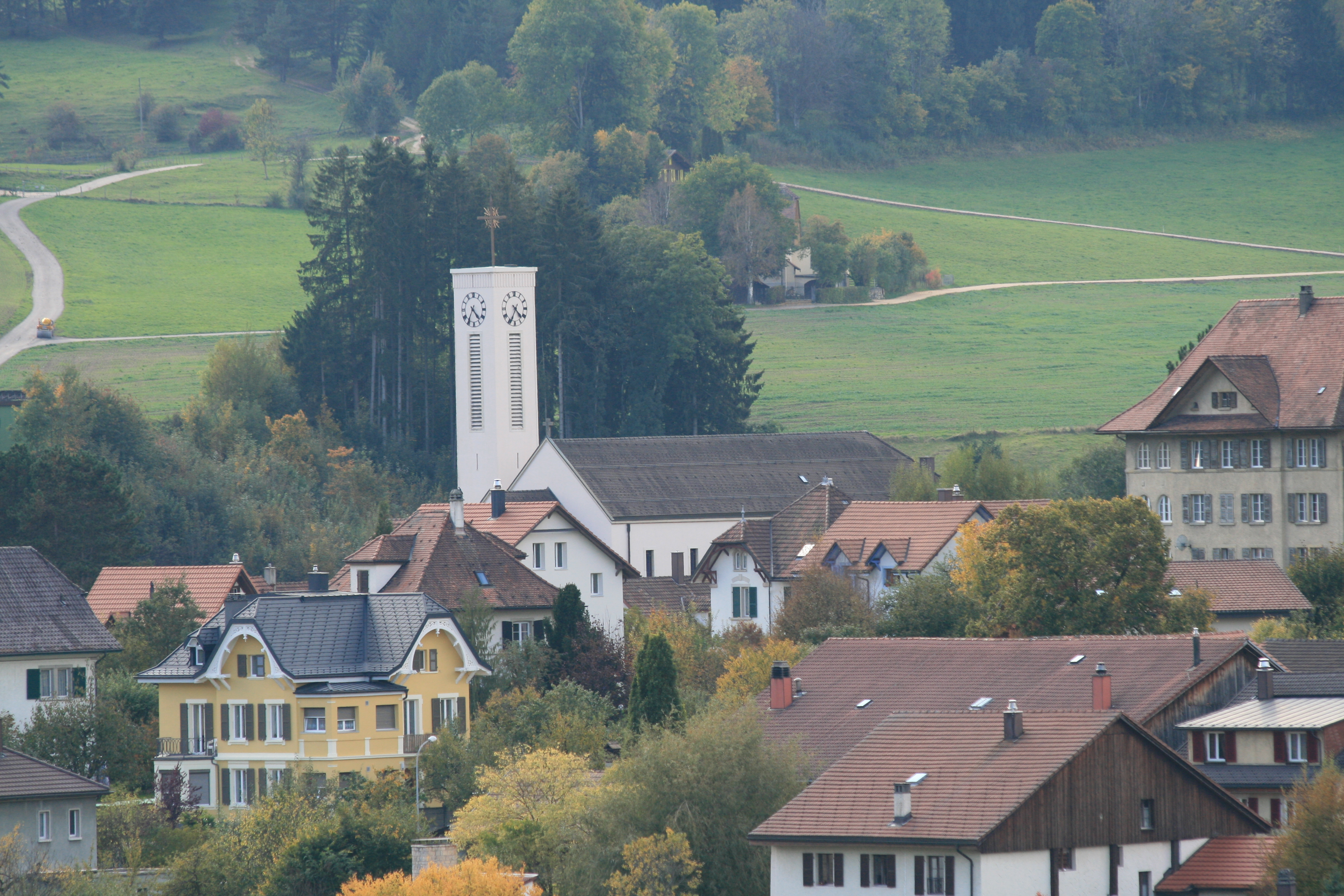
Eglise Du Christ-Roi

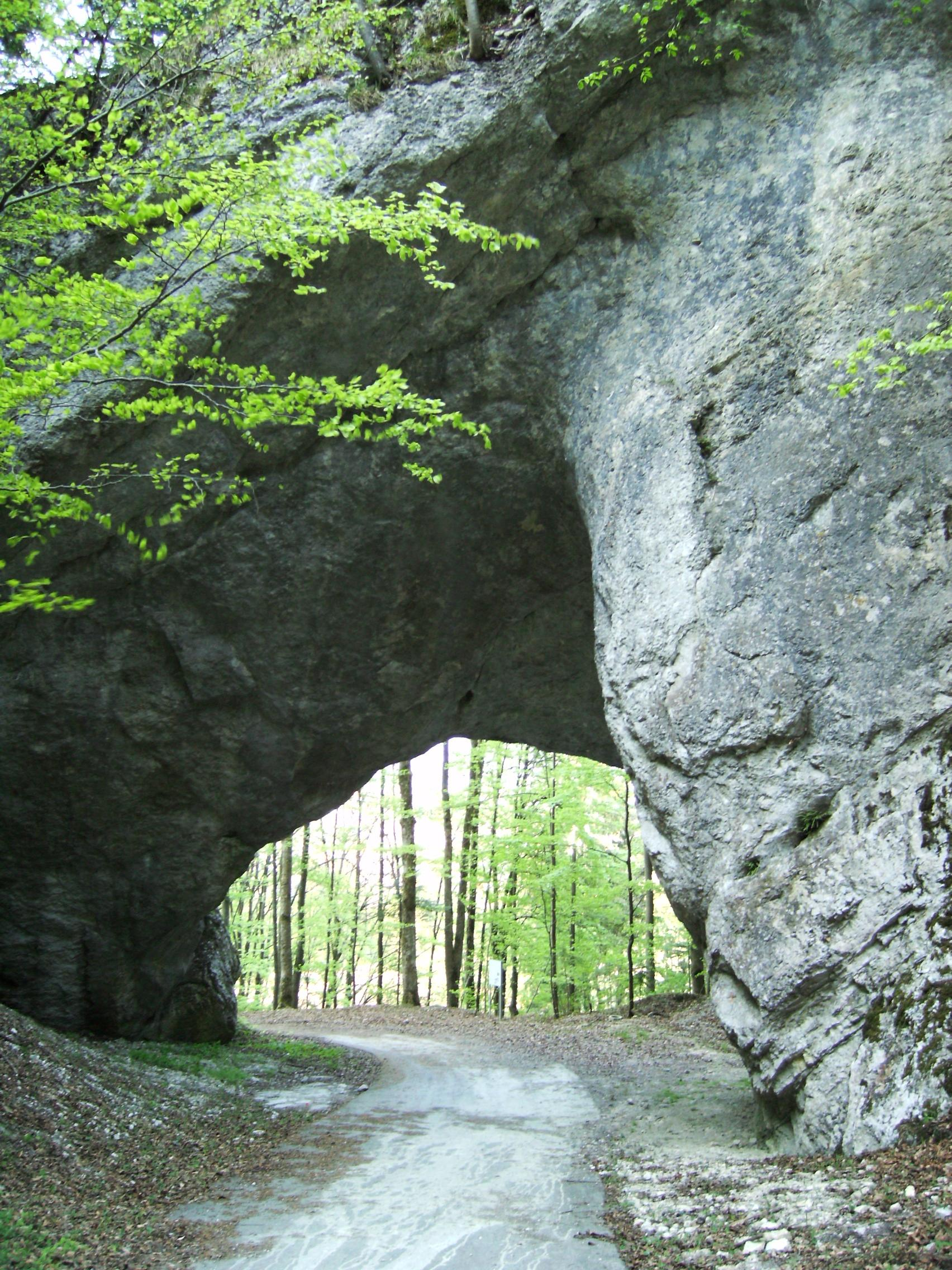
Pierre Pertuis passage

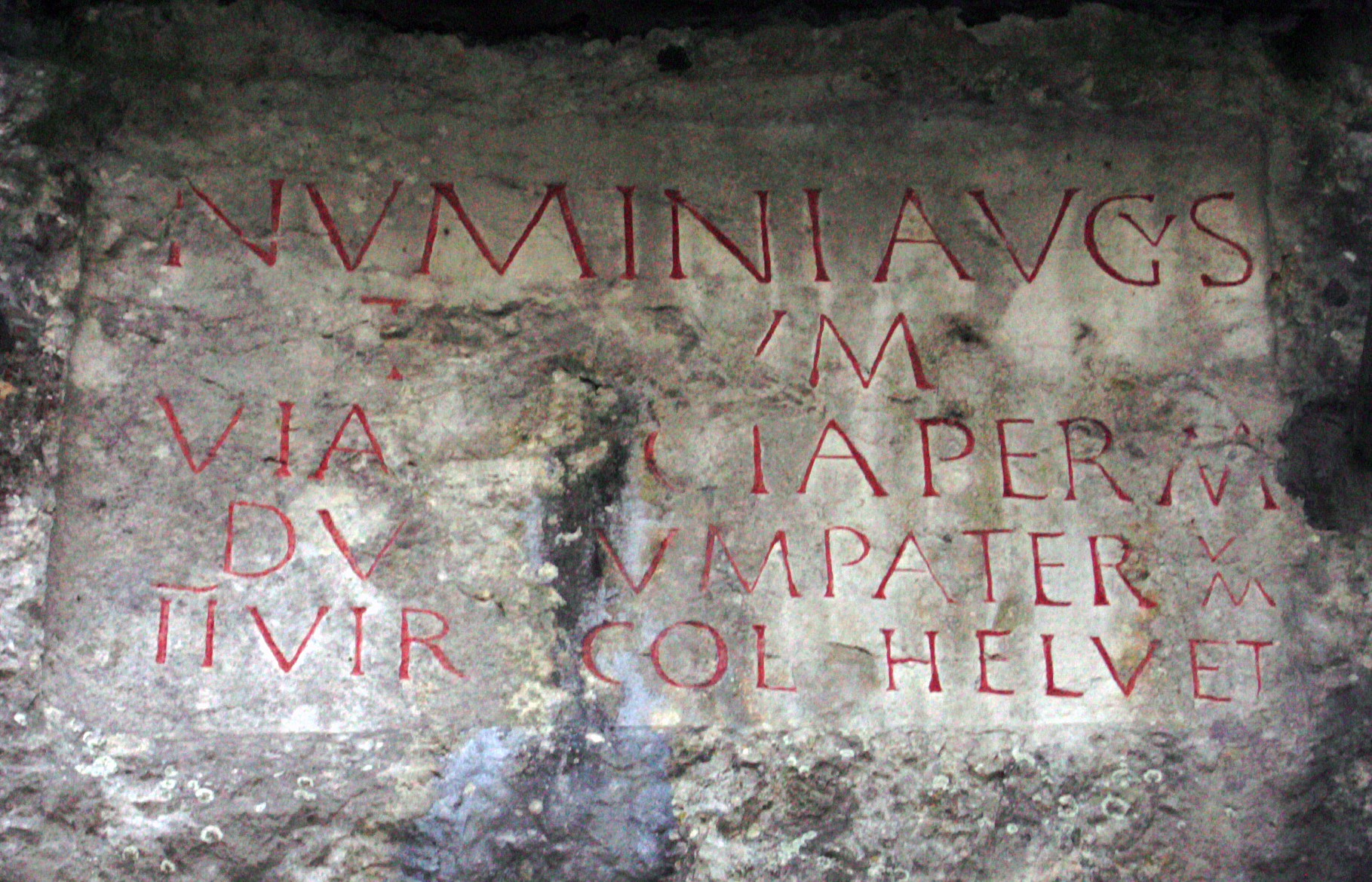
Inscription above the Pierre Pertuis

== Politics ==
In the 2011 federal election the most popular party was the Swiss People's Party (SVP) which received 29% of the vote. The next three most popular parties were the Social Democratic Party (SP) (28.4%), another local party (7.8%) and the Green Party (7.5%). In the federal election, a total of 819 votes were cast, and the voter turnout was 36.2%.

== Economy ==
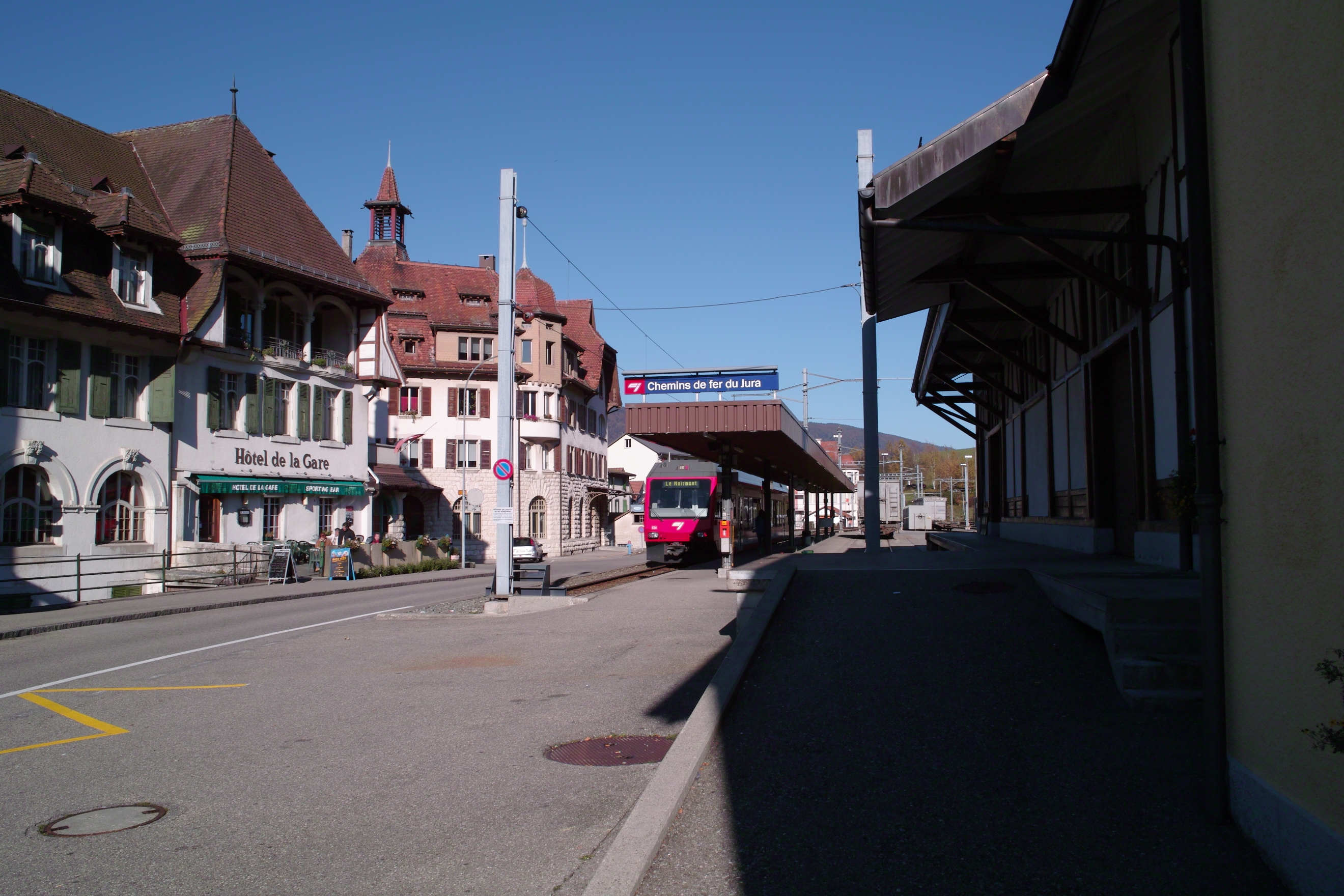
Chemins de Fer Jura rail station in Tavannes.

As of 2011, Tavannes had an unemployment rate of 2.72%. As of 2008, there were a total of 1,212 people employed in the municipality. Of these, there were 57 people employed in the primary economic sector and about 21 businesses involved in this sector. 476 people were employed in the secondary sector and there were 50 businesses in this sector. 679 people were employed in the tertiary sector, with 120 businesses in this sector. There were 1,686 residents of the municipality who were employed in some capacity, of which females made up 43.0% of the workforce.

In 2008 there were a total of 987 full-time equivalent jobs. The number of jobs in the primary sector was 42, of which 39 were in agriculture and 3 were in forestry or lumber production. The number of jobs in the secondary sector was 434 of which 246 or (56.7%) were in manufacturing and 170 (39.2%) were in construction. The number of jobs in the tertiary sector was 511. In the tertiary sector; 148 or 29.0% were in wholesale or retail sales or the repair of motor vehicles, 42 or 8.2% were in the movement and storage of goods, 39 or 7.6% were in a hotel or restaurant, 14 or 2.7% were in the information industry, 14 or 2.7% were the insurance or financial industry, 35 or 6.8% were technical professionals or scientists, 70 or 13.7% were in education and 95 or 18.6% were in health care.

In 2000, there were 672 workers who commuted into the municipality and 1,008 workers who commuted away. The municipality is a net exporter of workers, with about 1.5 workers leaving the municipality for every one entering. A total of 678 workers (50.5% of the 1,343 total workers in the municipality) both lived and worked in Tavannes. About 1.0% of the workforce coming into Tavannes are coming from outside Switzerland.

Of the working population, 13.6% used public transportation to get to work, and 60.4% used a private car.

In 2011 the average local and cantonal tax rate on a married resident, with two children, of Tavannes making 150,000 CHF was 13.1%, while an unmarried resident's rate was 19.2%. For comparison, the rate for the entire canton in the same year, was 14.2% and 22.0%, while the nationwide rate was 12.3% and 21.1% respectively. In 2009 there were a total of 1,503 tax payers in the municipality. Of that total, 407 made over 75,000 CHF per year. There were 18 people who made between 15,000 and 20,000 per year. The greatest number of workers, 410, made between 50,000 and 75,000 CHF per year. The average income of the over 75,000 CHF group in Tavannes was 119,231 CHF, while the average across all of Switzerland was 130,478 CHF.

In 2011 a total of 8.5% of the population received direct financial assistance from the government.

== Religion ==
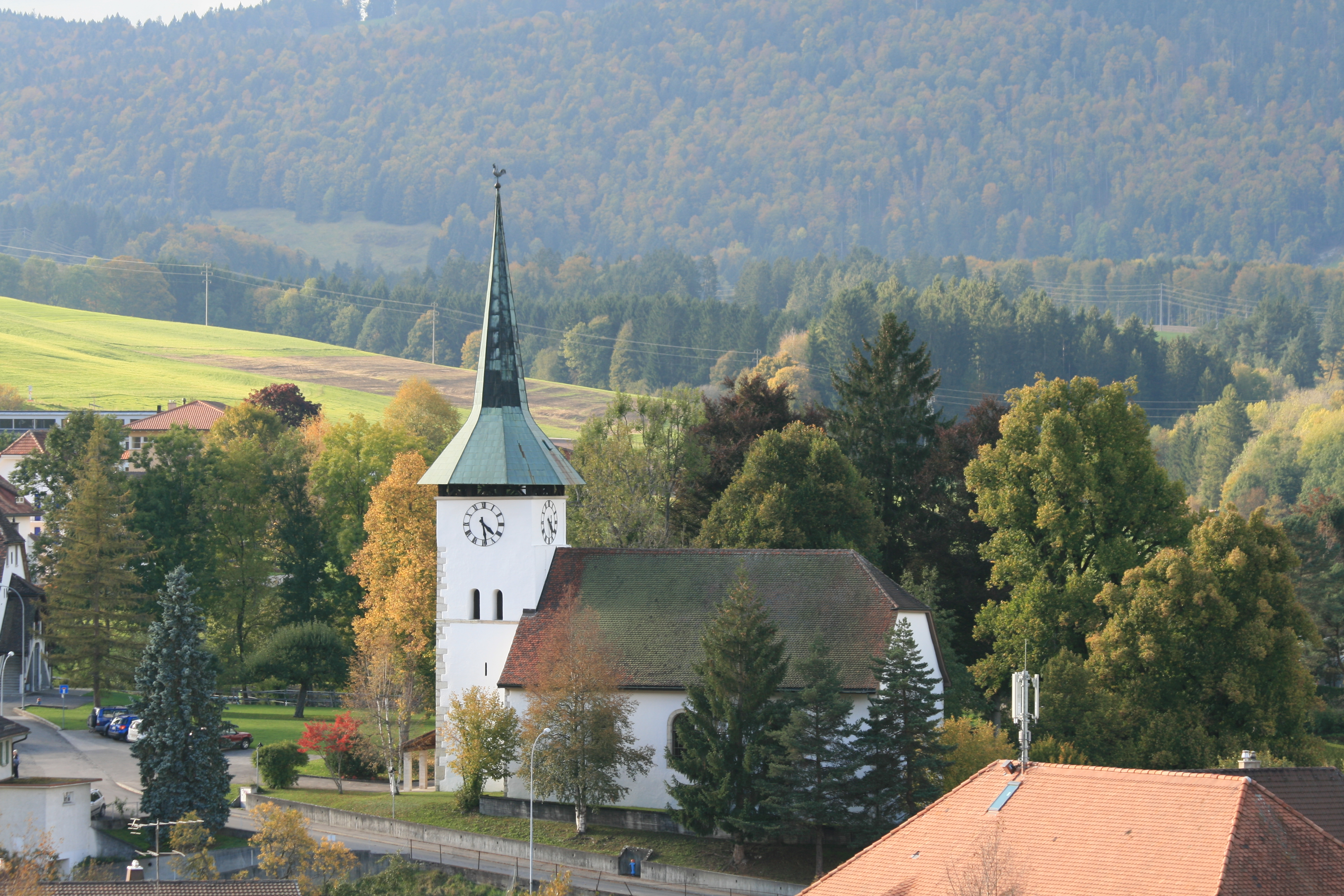
Reformed church in Tavannes

As of the 2000 census, 1,369 or 40.6% belonged to the Swiss Reformed Church, while 1,124 or 33.3% were Roman Catholic. Of the rest of the population, there were 13 members of an Orthodox church (or about 0.39% of the population), there was one individual who belonged to the Christian Catholic Church, and there were 298 individuals (or about 8.83% of the population) who belonged to another Christian church. There were 119 (or about 3.53% of the population) who were Islamic. There were five individuals who were Buddhist and six individuals who belonged to another church. 319 (or about 9.46% of the population) belonged to no church, are agnostic or atheist, and 119 individuals (or about 3.53% of the population) did not answer the question.

== Education ==
In Tavannes about 49.6% of the population have completed non-mandatory upper secondary education, and 11.9% have completed additional higher education (either university or a Fachhochschule). Of the 247 who had completed some form of tertiary schooling listed in the census, 59.9% were Swiss men, 27.9% were Swiss women, 8.9% were non-Swiss men and 3.2% were non-Swiss women.

The canton of Bern school system provides one year of non-obligatory kindergarten, followed by six years of primary school. This is followed by three years of obligatory lower secondary school, where the students are separated according to ability and aptitude. Following the lower secondary, students may attend additional schooling, or they may enter an apprenticeship.

During the 2011–12 school year, there were a total of 455 students attending classes in Tavannes. There were four kindergarten classes, with a total of 69 students in the municipality. Of the kindergarten students, 13.0% were permanent or temporary residents of Switzerland (not citizens) and 10.1% have a different native language than the classroom language. The municipality had 12 primary classes and 241 students. Of the primary students, 14.9% were permanent or temporary residents of Switzerland (not citizens), and 14.1% have a different native language than the classroom language. During the same year, there were six lower secondary classes with a total of 111 students. There were 20.7% who were permanent or temporary residents of Switzerland (not citizens), and 26.1% have a different native language than the classroom language. The remainder of the students attended a private or special school.

As of 2000, there were a total of 469 students attending any school in the municipality. Of those, 415 both lived and attended school in the municipality, while 54 students came from another municipality. During the same year, 83 residents attended schools outside the municipality.

Tavannes is home to the Bibliothèque régionale de Tavannes. The library has (as of 2008) 13,301 books or other media and loaned out 38,099 items in the same year. It was open a total of 230 days, with an average of 17.5 hours per week during that year.

== Transportation ==
The municipality has a railway station, Tavannes. It is located on the standard gauge Sonceboz-Sombeval–Moutier line and the narrow gauge Tavannes–Noirmont line and has regular service to Biel/Bienne, Moutier, and Le Noirmont.

== Attractions ==
- The Big Boss' Festival, a Christian music festival is held here annually.
- Expo Digger, run by the Digger Foundation, retraces the daily lives of the victims of landmines and shows how the solutions implemented restore hope and dignity to thousands of people.

== See also ==
- Sandoz watches
- Ivan Farron (born 1971), French speaking writer
