= Dig (disambiguation) =

To dig is to remove solid material from a surface.

Dig or DIG may also refer to:

== Arts, entertainment, and media ==
=== Films ===
- Dig!, a 2004 documentary
- Dig, a 1971 animated film by John Hubley and Faith Hubley
- Dig, a 2011 short film by Joshua Caldwell
- Dig (2022 film), a film by K. Asher Levin

=== Music ===
==== Groups and labels ====
- Dig (band), an American rock band
- Directions in Groove, or DIG, a defunct Australian acid jazz band

==== Albums ====
- Dig (Adam Again album) or the title song, 1992
- Dig (Boz Scaggs album), 2001
- Dig (Dig album), 1993
- Dig (I Mother Earth album), 1993
- Dig (Miles Davis album) or the title song, 1956
- Dig (Toshiko Akiyoshi album) or the title song, 1993
- Dig?, by Bill Bruford's Earthworks, 1989

==== Songs ====
- "Dig" (composition), a jazz standard by Miles Davis, 1951
- "Dig" (Incubus song), 2007
- "Dig" (Mark Lizotte song), 1999
- "Dig" (Mudvayne song), 2000
- "Dig", by Collective Soul from Collective Soul, 2009
- "Dig", by NOFX from the album Punk in Drublic, 1994
- "Dig", by Quiet Riot from Down to the Bone, 1995

=== Periodicals ===
- Dig (magazine), a children's magazine associated with the Archaeological Institute of America
- Weekly Dig, an alternative newsweekly in Boston, Massachusetts

=== Other arts, entertainment, and media ===
- Dig (2015 TV series), an American action series
- Dig (upcoming TV series), an American comedy series
- ABC DiG, an Australian digital radio service
- Carl Diggler, a fictional American journalist whose nickname and column are called "The Dig"
- Dig (Clune book), a 1937 non-fiction book by Frank Clune
- Dig (novel), a 2019 young adult novel by A. S. King

== Computing and technology ==
- dig (command), a Unix network utility for querying DNS name servers
- DIG, a filename extension referring to either Digilink or Sound Designer files

== Law and law enforcement ==
- Deputy inspector general of police, an Indian, Pakistani or Sri Lankan police service officer
- Deputy inspector general of prisons, an Indian or Pakistani provincial prison service officer
- Dismissed as improvidently granted, in the procedures of the U.S. Supreme Court, a decision regarding a previously granted appeal

== Transport ==
- Digby & Sowton railway station, Devon, England; National Rail station code DIG
- Diqing Shangri-La Airport, Yunnan, China; IATA airport code DIG

== Other uses ==
- Archaeological dig, an excavation
- Volleyball dig, often shortened to "dig"
- Dig (woreda), a district of Somali Region, Ethiopia
- DIG: an archaeological adventure, an educational resource in York, England
- Digoxigenin or dig, a plant-produced steroid used for biochemical "tagging"
- Dig (restaurant), an American fast-casual restaurant chain
- Disablement Income Group, a British disability rights organization

== See also ==
- The Dig (disambiguation)
- Big Dig, a megaproject in Boston, Massachusetts, U.S.
- Deeg, a city in Rajasthan, India
- Digg, a community-based popularity website
- Digger (disambiguation)
