= Garden Railways =

- Editor: Hal Miller
- Categories: Hobby magazine, model train magazine
- Frequency: Quarterly
- Publisher: Kalmbach Media Co.
- Founder: Marc Horovitz
- Founded: 1984
- First issue: December 1984
- Final issue: September 2020
- Country: United States
- Based in: Waukesha, Wisconsin
- Language: English
- Website: gardenrailways.com
- ISSN: 0747-0622

Garden Railways (GR) was an American magazine about the hobby of running large-scale trains outdoors, also called garden railroading. During its run, it was the world's leading magazine on that subject. Each issue featured hobby news, product reviews, how-to articles, featured railroads from around the world, photo galleries, and much more. Publication ceased after the Fall 2020 issue.

Garden Railways magazine began publication in 1984 by Sidestreet Bannerworks. The magazine evolved from the company's newsletter, the Sidestreet Banner, which dealt primarily with the small scale live-steam locomotives that the company was importing at that time. Marc Horovitz was the Editor and Barbara Horovitz the Horticultural Editor.

Garden Railways' first issue

The first issues of Garden Railways were published in black-and-white. Text was generated on a typewriter. In 1985, a primitive IBM computer and a daisy-wheel printer were acquired, which allowed text to be printed out in justified columns. These columns, printed out in strips, were then pasted up by hand in the old-fashioned way.

Petria MacDonnell joined GR's staff at the beginning of 1986 as the magazine's first gardening editor, later succeeded by Chip Rosenblum, Barbara Abler, and Don Parker. Among the regular contributors in the magazine's early years was Peter Jones, who had a column in every issue until his death in 2009.

The magazine continued to grow, becoming an international publication with contributors from all over the world. In August 1985, Garden Railways, along with the Denver Garden Railway Society, sponsored the first ever Garden Railway Convention, in Denver, Colorado. The National Garden Railway Conventions continue today, though they are events hosted by local clubs and are no longer affiliated with Garden Railways magazine.

The May–June 1986 issue of GR was the first that appeared with an arched title on the cover, which became a trademark of the magazine. With the November–December 1986 issue, Garden Railways appeared with its first full-color cover. After that, color was gradually incorporated into the inside of the magazine, too.

In 1996, Garden Railways was sold to Kalmbach Publishing Company in Wisconsin. Marc Horovitz remained as editor of the magazine in Denver while Barb Horovitz, the magazine's former Horticultural Editor, retired the following year. Pat Hayward was Horticultural Editor from 1997 to 2008. Nancy Norris joined the staff in 2008 as Horticultural Editor.

Marc Horovitz stepped down as editor in October 2018 and Kent Johnson became editor in November 2018. In October 2019, Kent was promoted to Producer of MR Video Plus, and Hal Miller became editor. Rene Schweitzer, the magazine's production editor, joined the staff in 1998 and is currently editor of Classic Toy Trains magazine. Cody Grivno and Dana Kawala, both from Model Railroader magazine, help the staff by writing in-house product reviews and offering technical support.

On July 15, 2020, it was announced that the magazine would cease publication after the Fall 2020 issue. Some aspects of the magazine moved to Model Railroader.

== The magazine's content ==
Garden Railways' Summer 2019 issue

Garden Railways was published bi-monthly until 2019, when it changed to quarterly publication. Each issue contained hobby-related articles on a variety of subjects, including featured garden railroads, how-to projects, landscaping and gardening, photo galleries, new product information and reviews of products relating to large-scale trains, such as locomotives, rolling stock, sound systems, books, and more.

Regular departments included "Garden railway basics," aimed at beginners; "Plant portraits," a featured miniature plant targeted toward railroad gardeners; "Greening your railway," a gardening/hardscaping column; "One-page project", where readers shared a short how-to project.
