= Ladybug (magazine) =

American illustrated children's literary magazine

- Editor: Kathleen Anderson
- Categories: Children's, literary
- Frequency: 9 per year
- Founder: Marianne Carus
- Founded: 1990
- Company: The Cricket Magazine Group; Carus Publishing Company
- Country: United States
- Based in: Chicago, Illinois
- Language: English
- ISSN: 1051-4961 (print); 2769-8661 (web)
- OCLC: 1099135722

Ladybug is an illustrated literary magazine for children ages 2 to 6. It is published in the United States by The Cricket Magazine Group/Carus Publishing Company, and appears 9 times a year, every month except for combined May/June, July/August, and November/December issues. The magazine is based in Chicago, Illinois.

== History and profile ==
Ladybug was founded in 1990 by Marianne Carus, the editor-in-chief of Cricket magazine. Carus wanted to provide an art and literary publication for young children as a precursor to Cricket.

Ladybug features four regular serials in each issue. “Max and Kate” is written and illustrated by the British team Mick Manning and Brita Granström, and chronicles the everyday adventures of two best friends, Max and Kate. “Mop and Family” is a comic strip by the Dutch husband-and-wife team Alex de Wolf and Martine Schaap centering on a brother and sister and their sheepdog, Mop. “Molly and Emmett” is the longest-running serial in the magazine, created by children's illustrator Marylin Hafner, and follows a young girl named Molly and her mischievous cat, Emmett. In January 2008, Ladybug introduced the rollicking trio, Ladybug, Muddle, and Thud, characters that appear in the margins of the magazine in their own parallel universe and draw kids into the content.

In addition to original stories and poems, Ladybug offers non-fiction articles on the natural and cultural world, as well as songs, games, and activities to introduce children to language and reading. As with the other magazines published by the Cricket Magazine Group, Ladybug accepts no advertising.

In 2008, the magazine launched a website for children, www.ladybugmagkids.com. The site features book reviews by Ladybug, Muddle, and Thud, and recordings of songs.
