= Digger Foundation =

Swiss non-profit organisation

Digger Foundation is a non-profit organization, recognized as being of public utility in Switzerland, located in Tavannes, in the Bernese Jura. It promotes technological assistance projects in the field of humanitarian demining. Under the name Digger DTR, it develops, manufactures, and markets mine clearance machines to assist deminers by significantly increasing the efficiency of their work, making it less dangerous, and making technological investment accessible.

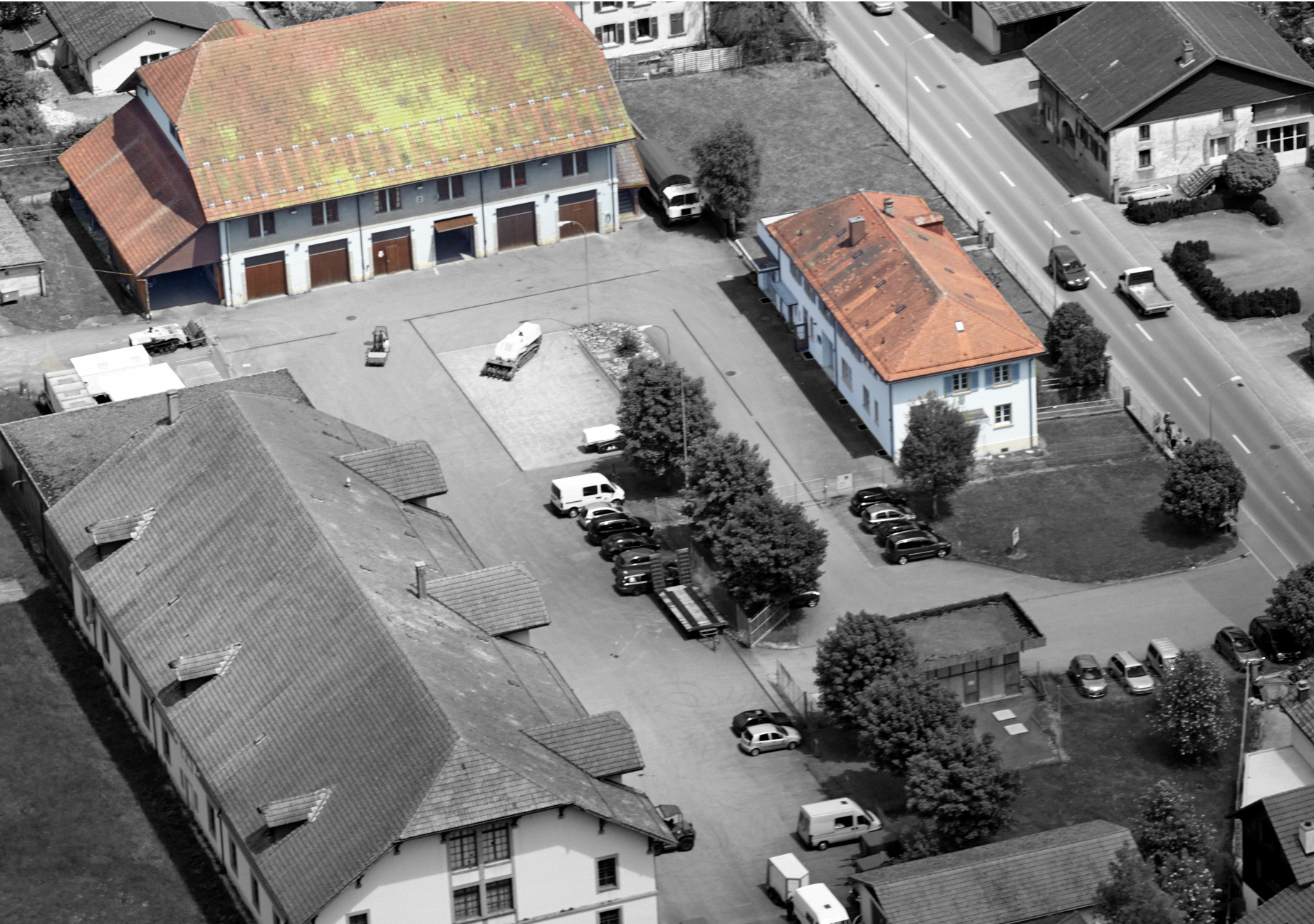
Usine Tavannes

== History ==
In 1998, Frédéric Guerne, an electronics engineer, completed a two-year mine detection project at École Polytechnique Fédérale de Lausanne (EPFL.) He subsequently met Michel Diot, co-founder of the Swiss Foundation for Mine Action (Fondation Suisse de Deminage), who encouraged him to focus his efforts on the design and production of a land clearing tool designed to facilitate and make the work of deminers safer. Frédéric Guerne then brought together around thirty volunteers, ranging from 14 to 30 years old, from different backgrounds around this project, which lasted four years and cost approximately 150,000 Swiss francs. During that time, none of the volunteers received a salary.

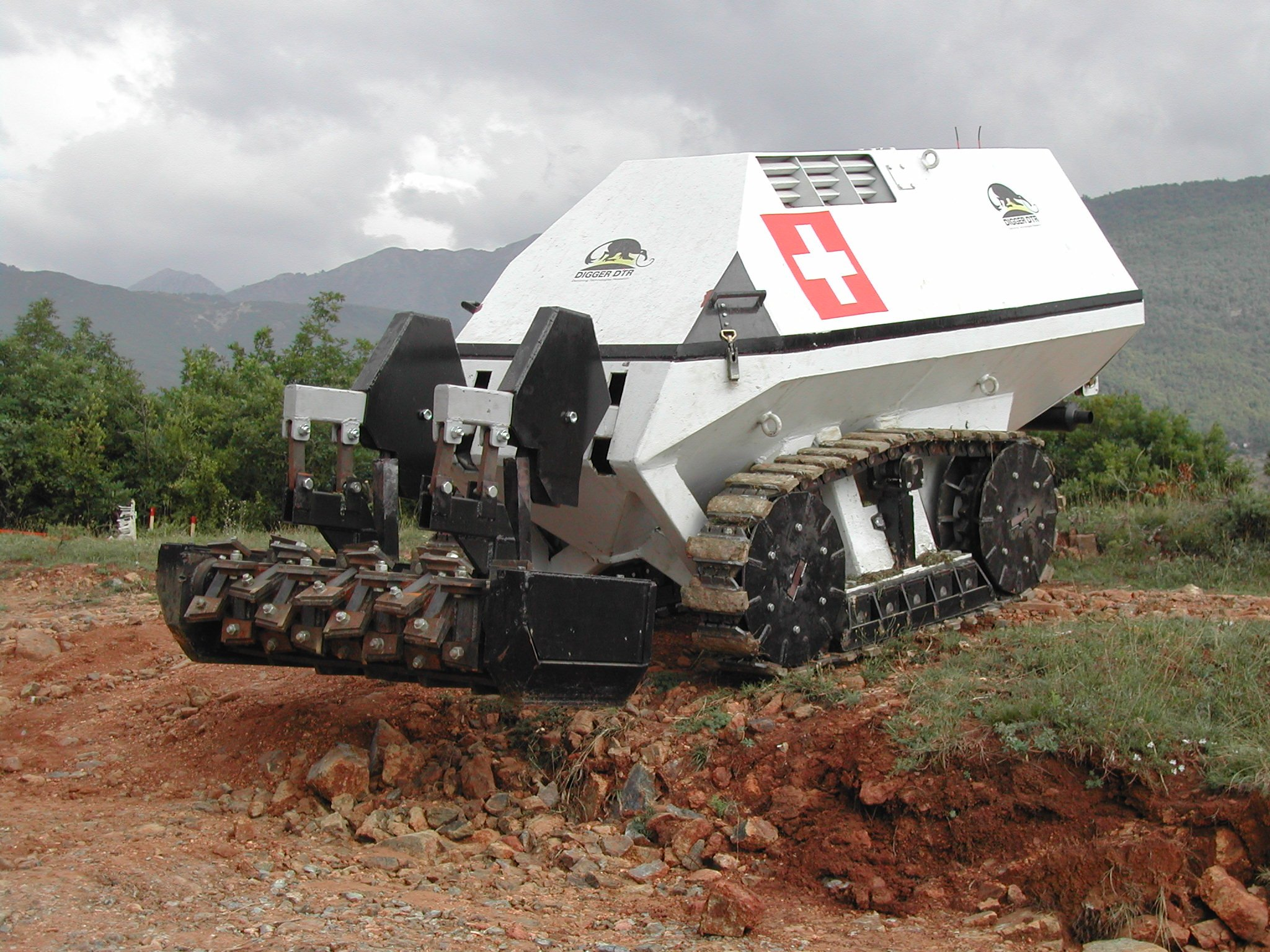
DIGGER D-1

After an initial prototype, called DIGGER D-1, which was used in Kosovo,. the specifications evolved: not only did the land have to be cleared of vegetation, but it also had to be demined by turning over the soil. The increased power of the machine, driven by this new demand, required three years of development and a thorough revision of the initial design.

The second machine was sent to South Sudan, to clear parts of the border between Sudan and Ethiopia, to which many Sudanese had fled during the war, in order to provide them mine-free areas to cross the border when returning to Sudan. During an interview, Frédéric Guerne stated that "When we destroyed the first real mine in the field, I said we probably saved one person's life. It was the most beautiful gift I have ever received in my life." In 2004, the organization was officially recognized as being of public utility by the Swiss government. For the first six years, the organization operated entirely on a volunteer basis. The scale of this commitment gradually led it to become more professional. Digger now relies on a team of employees based in Tavannes.

== A Weapon Against Mines ==
Digger's proposed solution to the problem of mines took the form of a blast-resistant armored vehicle that was light enough to be transported to regions where road conditions were far below Western standards.

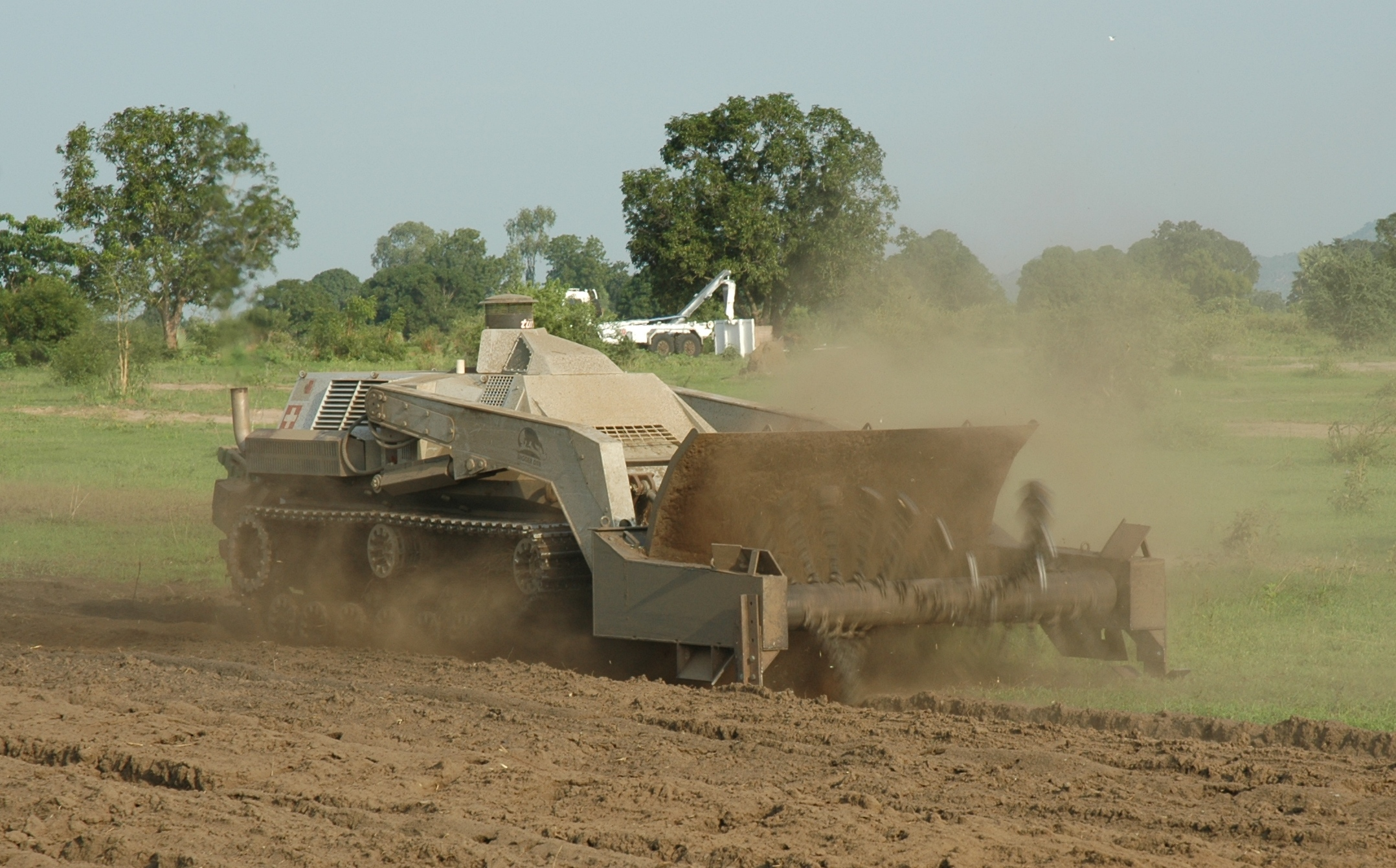
DIGGER D-2

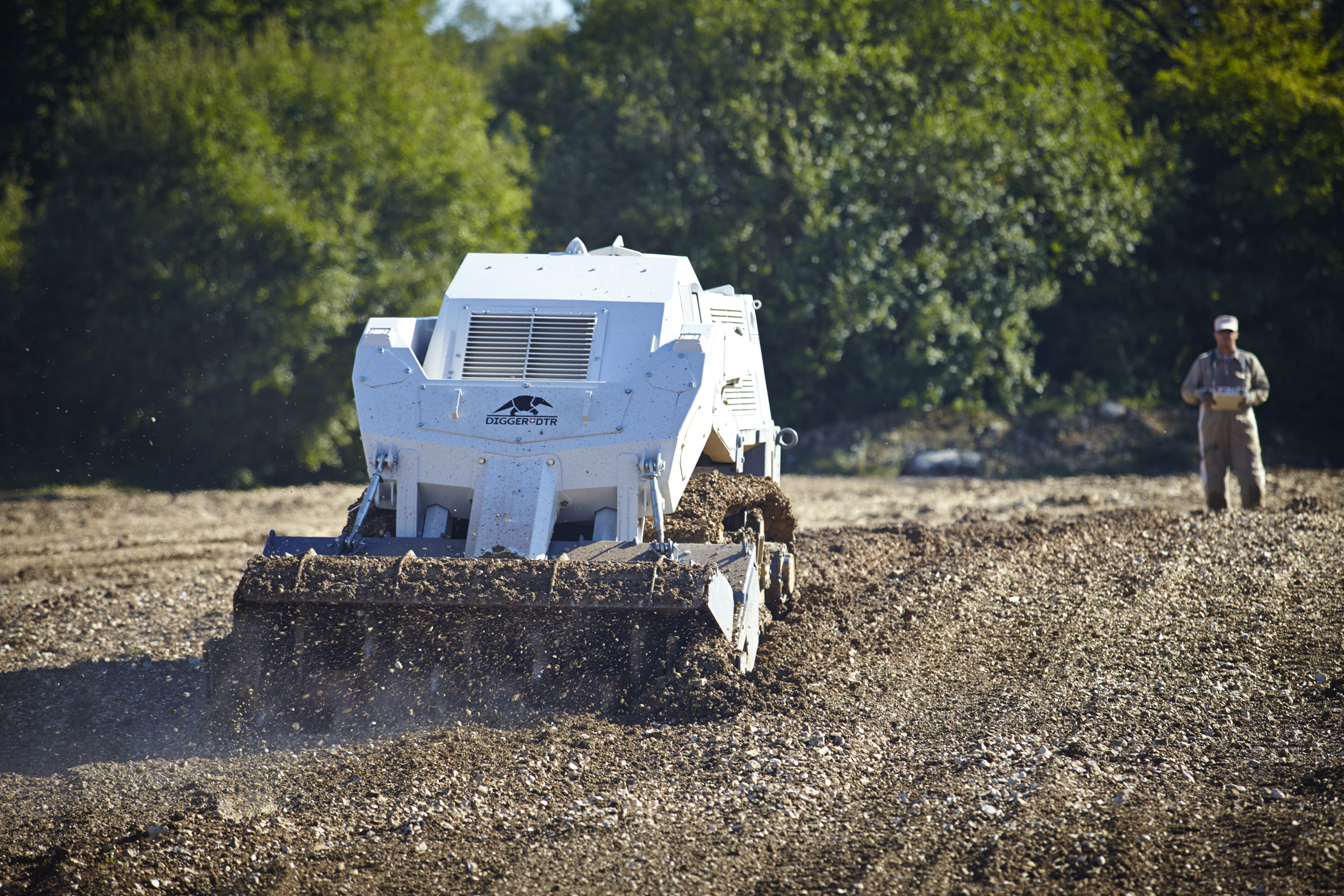
DIGGER D-250 3

To ensure complete safety for the operator, who remains a safe distance from the danger zone, the vehicle is remote-controlled. It is equipped with a device that clears the densest vegetation and turns over the soil to a depth of 25 cm. (10 inches.) This operation neutralizes the mines while preparing the ground for post-operation inspection under optimal conditions. This final step allows the area to be declared permanently safe, according to the current stringent standards of humanitarian demining. According to the foundation, a machine with a team of ten people (deminers, mechanics, drivers, cooks, and medical staff) has an output equivalent to that of a team of 200 to 300 manual deminers with their supervisors. Considering that a manual deminer is paid an average of $250 per month, this brings the annual cost of manual demining to more than $750,000 The machine represents an initial investment, but it reduces the risk for deminers and lowers the price per square meter cleared of mines. According to the foundation, after 18 months of using a DIGGER D3, Handicap International in Senegal has seen the price per square meter cleared of mines reduced tenfold.

Digger's machines have been used for demining in Angola, Benin, Bosnia-Herzegovina, Cambodia, France, Israel, Macedonia, Mali, Mozambique and Senegal. The current fourth generation machine, the D-250, has a 250-horsepower engine, weighs seven tons and is able to destroy anti-tank mines with up to the explosive power of 8 kg. of TNT.

== New Challenges ==
While continuing to work in forgotten conflict zones such as Cambodia, Frédéric Guerne is designing machines capable of operating in the rubble of urban areas in Syria, Iraq, Yemen, and Ukraine and dealing with more powerful bombs. These machines for urban removal of mines and unexploded bombs resemble construction machinery and are remote-controlled. The pilot is thus safe, guiding operations from a distance of 500m using virtual reality goggles.

Due to the increased demand for demining machines as a result of the war in Ukraine, where it is estimated that one-third of the country's surface is contaminated with land mines and unexploded ordnance, Digger undertook to triple its production from its current level of two per year to between five and seven machines per year. Although the original goal was to set up a production facility in Ukraine, this was not possible; therefore in 2024 Digger increased its production facilities in Tavannes by 200 square meters and tripled its machine construction personnel.

The first Digger demining machine was sent to Ukraine in early 2024 and was financed by the Swiss Confederation at a cost of 1.2 million Swiss francs, including the machine, a truck to transport it, a trailer with spare parts, and training for machine operators. This was the first time that Digger has sent one of its demining machines to a zone of active conflict, and Frédéric Guerne expressed concern that, as the machine moves at a top speed of 6 km/h under its own power, or 1 km/h when demining, the machine could become a target. .

== Expo Digger ==
In addition to its active role in the field, Digger has been active since its inception in communicating about mining issues through numerous conferences. To strengthen this educational and awareness-raising approach, the project for a Digger museum came to fruition in May 2011.

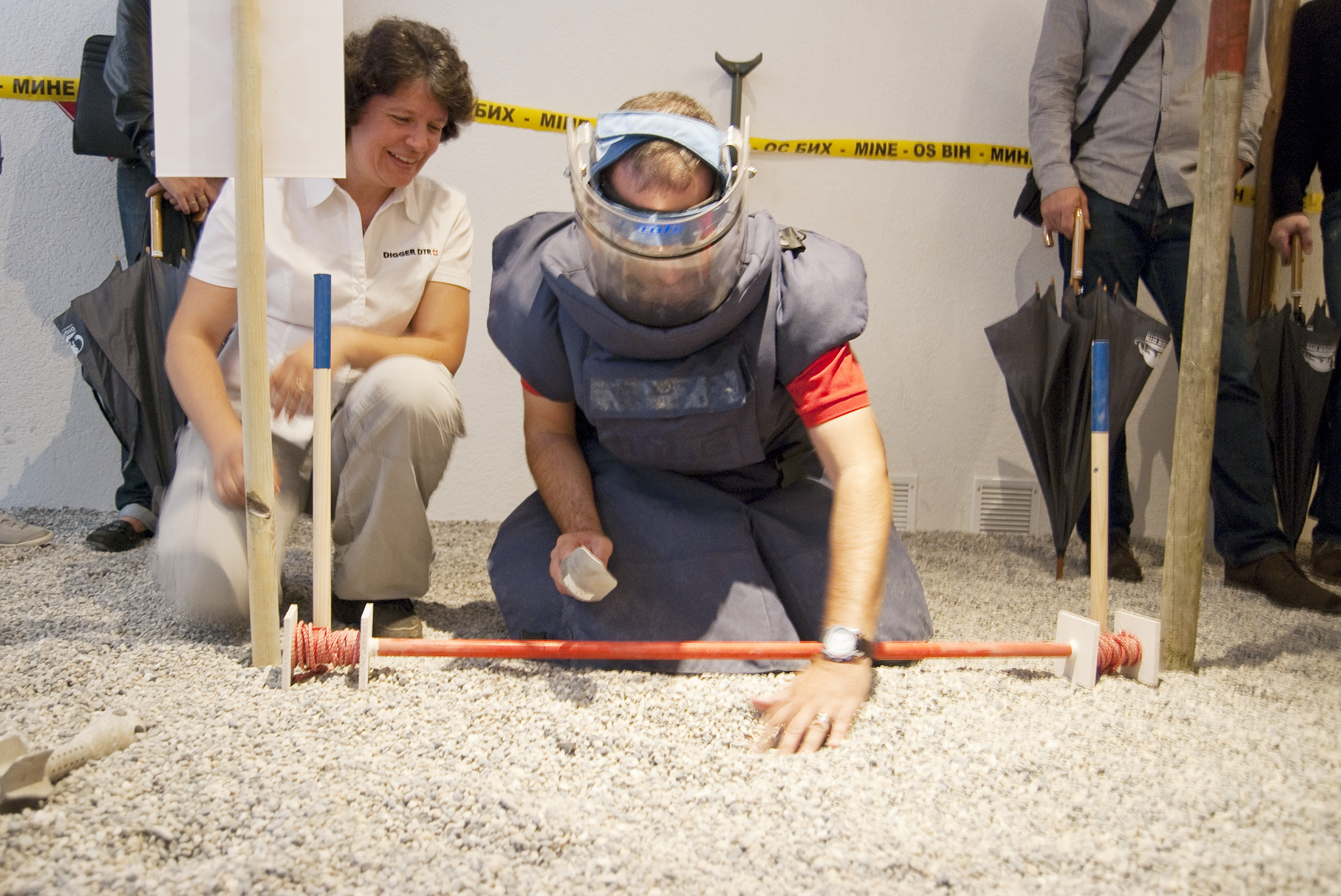
Expo Digger

Expo Digger, located on the production site in Tavannes, retraces the daily lives of the victims and shows how the solutions implemented restore hope and dignity to thousands of people.
