= Digger Okonkwo =

Maltese footballer

Personal information
- Full name: Digger Ifeanyi Okonkwo
- Date of birth: 30 August 1977 (age 49)
- Place of birth: Nigeria
- Position: Defender

Senior career*
Years	Team	Apps	(Gls)
- Għajnsielem
1998–2001	Naxxar Lions	61	(4)
2001–2004	Pietà Hotspurs	58	(1)
2004–2006	Mosta F.C.	22	(2)
2006–2007	Pietà Hotspurs	8	(0)
2007–2008	Senglea Athletic		

International career
1999–2001	Malta	8	(0)
- * Club domestic league appearances and goals

Digger Ifeanyi Okonkwo (born 30 August 1977) is a former professional footballer who last played for Senglea Athletic. Born in Nigeria, he represented the Malta national team.

== Career ==
Digger has previously played for many different Maltese clubs such as Għajnsielem, Pietà Hotspurs, Mosta F.C. and Naxxar Lions, before ending his career at Senglea Athletic.

== International career ==
Okonkwo has also represented the Malta national side and played his first match on 21 August 1999.
