= Carus Publishing Company =

American publisher

- Parent company: Cricket Media
- Founded: 1973
- Founder: Marianne Carus
- Country of origin: United States
- Headquarters location: Chicago
- Publication types: Magazines, Books
- Imprints: Cricket, Cobblestone, Open Court

The Carus Publishing Company, now subsumed into Cricket Media, was a publisher with offices in Chicago, Peterborough, New Hampshire and Peru, Illinois. Its Peterborough office was closed June 30, 2015. Its Peru offices have closed as well, and operations primarily occur in Chicago. It owns the Open Court Publishing Company as well as the Cricket Magazine Group, and Cobblestone Publishing. Open Court is known for their Popular Culture and Philosophy books, while Cricket and Cobblestone produce a range of children's magazines.

Their magazines for children and teens are Ask, Babybug, Click, Cobblestone, Cricket, Faces, Ladybug, Muse, and Spider.

Carus was founded in 1973 and was acquired by the Canadian company ePals Corporation in December 2011. The ePals Corporation was renamed Cricket Media in 2014. Cricket Media was acquired by ZG Ventures in 2016.
