= The Digger (Scottish magazine) =

Scottish crime magazine

- Type: Weekly magazine
- Format: Tabloid
- Owner: James Cruickshank
- Founded: 2004
- Headquarters: Glasgow
- Price: £1.25
- Website: www.the-digger.com

The Digger is a 24-page magazine in Glasgow, Scotland which focusses on crime stories. It is published weekly, in an A5 newsletter format. In 2012, the magazine went from newsprint to glossy.

== Background ==
The magazine was founded by James Cruickshank in 2004, and currently has eight full-time staff members, of which five are accredited journalists. Two are full-time court reporters. The Digger also employs lawyers to legal the magazine every week.

In 2007, the magazine claimed to have a circulation of up to 10,000. Distribution is through 600 shops in the Greater Glasgow area. Sales fluctuate between 6,500 and 10,000 each week.

The paper focusses on stories about local organised crime, and alleged corruption within Police Scotland and Glasgow City Council, sometimes also naming alleged local drug dealers and paedophiles. At one stage Cruickshank was banned from covering stories at Glasgow Sheriff Court.
