= Muse (children's magazine) =

American children's magazine

Muse Magazine
- The cover of the May/June 2007 issue of Muse.
- Editor: Joseph Taylor
- Contributing Editor: Kathryn Hulick
- Contributing Editor: Tracy Vonder Brink
- Assistant Editor: Hayley Kim
- Company: Cricket Media
- Based in: Chicago
- Website: cricketmedia.com
- ISSN: 1090-0381

Muse is a children's magazine published by Cricket Media, the publishers of Cricket. Launched in January 1997, it is published in Chicago, Illinois, and has readers throughout the United States and around the world. From 1997 to today, Muse has been published by Carus Publishing, Cricket Media and been sponsored by Smithsonian. Recommended for ages nine and above, it features articles about science, technology, and the arts. It is edited by Joseph Taylor. Until 2015, nine cartoon characters, known as the Muses, appeared in the margins throughout the magazine as well as in the Kokopelli & Company comic strip. After merging with its sister magazine Odyssey in September 2015, Muse added new content, changed its layout, and replaced the Muses with a comic titled "Parallel U" featuring different characters.

== Magazine contents ==
Muse is a science and arts magazine intended for kids 9 to 14 and up. It consists of 48 pages with no advertising and is published nine times each year. Issues regularly contain a comic strip ("Parallel U"), letters from readers (Muse Mail), news items (Muse News), a contest, a question-and-answer page featuring experts, a page about technology, a page about math, a hands-on activity, as well as feature articles on various topics. Issues are themed. In 2023, issue subjects included space exploration, tree secrets, and brainpower. Past issues have included articles about vegetarianism, pie throwing, extraterrestrial life, naked mole-rats, the origin of the Moon, pirates, urban legends, insects, mummies, tenrecs, New Zealand's exploding trousers, Rube Goldberg inventions, The Lord of the Rings, and blind cavefish.

== Muses ==
The Muses were drawn by cartoonist Larry Gonick. Among them, only Urania was one of the original Greek muses; Kokopelli, a trickster, is a god in many Native American tribes.

- Kokopelli: Muse of tunes and tricks, who often throws pies
- Chad: Muse of Hardware
- Aeiou: Muse of Software
- Bo: Muse of Factoids
- Urania: Muse of Astronomy
- Feather: Muse of Plants
- Crraw: Muse of Bad Poetry
- Pwt: Muse of Animals
- Mimi: Muse of getting along with people

In addition, Devil, Kokopelli's dog, and Angel, Mimi's cat, were occasionally featured, more so in older issues.

As of September 2015, the Muses have been removed from the magazine, replaced with a new comic called "Parallel U" drawn by Caanan Grall.

== Awards ==
- 2019 Parents’ Choice Gold
- 2018 Parents’ Choice Gold
- 2017 Parents’ Choice Gold
- 2016 Parents' Choice Gold
- 2015 Parents' Choice Gold
- 2014 Parents' Choice Gold
- 2013 Parents' Choice Gold
- 2012 Parents' Choice Gold
- 2010 Parents' Choice Gold
- 2008 Parents' Choice Silver
- 2005 Parents' Choice Gold
