= Digger (nickname) =

Digger is a nickname for:

- Russell Aitken (RAF officer) (1913–1989), New Zealand pilot and Royal Air Force group captain during the Second World War
- John Barnes (born 1963), Jamaican-born English former footballer and manager
- Arthur Brown (footballer, born 1858) (1859–1909), English footballer
- Duane G. Carey (born 1957), former NASA astronaut and retired US Air Force lieutenant colonel
- Al Cervi (1917–2009), American National Basketball League and National Basketball Association player and coach
- Digger Dawson (1905–?), English footballer
- Dale DeGray (born 1963), former National Hockey League player
- Paul Diggin (born 1985), English rugby union player
- William James (1930–2015), Australian Army major general
- Digger Kettle (1922–1999), English footballer
- Peter Martin (born 1968), English former cricketer
- Rupert Murdoch, media baron, so named by Private Eye
- Billy O'Dell (1933–2018), former Major League Baseball pitcher
- Ken Phelps (born 1954), former Major League Baseball player
- Digger Phelps (born 1941), American basketball coach and sportscaster
- Digger Robertson (William Robertson, 1861–1938), Australian cricketer
- Digger Stanley (1876–1919), English boxer
- William "Digger" Thomas (1890–1953), Australian rules footballer

== Fictional characters ==
- Willard "Digger" Barnes, a character from the TV series, Dallas
- George "Digger" Harkness, the first Captain Boomerang appearing in DC Comics
