= Dig (woreda) =

- District
- Country: Ethiopia

Dig is a district of Somali Region in Ethiopia.

== See also ==
- Districts of Ethiopia
