= The Dig (podcast) =

- Genre: Political

Cast and voices
- Hosted by: Daniel Denvir

Music
- Theme music composed by: Jeffrey Brodsky

Production
- Production: Alex Lewis
- Length: 1.5 − 2.5 hours

Publication
- Original release: 2015
- Provider: Jacobin Magazine
- Updates: Weekly

Related
- Website: https://thedigradio.com/

The Dig is an American podcast by Daniel Denvir featuring scientific and political analyses of politics, history, and economics from the perspective of the American Left. The Dig is published by Jacobin magazine and affiliated with Verso Books. The episodes are available free of charge, and the podcast is primarily funded by voluntary contributions from listeners on the Patreon platform. The podcast features interviews, mostly conducted by Daniel Denvir, with scholars, theorists, and political organizers, which enable an in-depth examination of individual topics from a socialist, unorthodox Marxist perspective and serve as political education for left-wing movements.

== Content and orientation ==
The aim of the podcast, which is broadcast from Denvir's garage in Providence, Rhode Island, is to bring together the intellectual and academic left with the practical political left. The Dig aims to serve a new socialist movement which, according to Denvir, “must understand the world in order to change it.” Well-known guests have included Alexandria Ocasio-Cortez, Bernie Sanders, Nancy Fraser, and Quinn Slobodian.

Denvir initially worked as a journalist for the Philadelphia City Paper, The Atlantic's CityLab, and Salon.com. Shortly before the presidential election in November 2016, in which Donald Trump was elected US president, he lost his job at Salon. Together with Alex Lewis as producer and his partner, political scientist Thea Riofrancos, he now revived an old idea (a single episode had already been broadcast in September 2015): a podcast that aims to combine the intellectual and academic side of the left with that of practical organizing:

“I had long thought that the academic left was far too cloistered from the activist left in the United States [...] and that activists and organizers outside of academia would greatly benefit from understanding the world better in their efforts to change it.”

— Daniel Denvir: Interview with The Guardian

The first episode was released on December 6, 2016, shortly after the presidential election, and attempted to answer the question Why Trump Won in an interview with feminist historian Stephanie Coontz and historians and racism researchers Khalil Gibran Muhammad and Matt Karp. Already at this point, a frequently recurring theme of the podcast emerged: a profound analysis and critique of current American politics, encompassing not only the political right around Trump, the Republican Party, and right-wing movements, but also the Democratic Party leadership, which is understood as neoliberal.

From both a practical political and a theoretical (materialist) perspective, the podcast also consistently critiques what it understands as the idealism of liberal politics. In doing so, it not only draws on classical Marxist class analysis, but also combines it with anti-racist, queer-feminist, and anti-imperialist analyses, as well as perspectives on climate justice and eco-socialism. It addresses both current local politics in the US, such as the successes and future prospects of organizing in Philadelphia (interview with organizers from Reclaim Philadelphia), and international politics, for example in analyses of Chinese history, politics, and society by Ho-fung Hung. During the Gaza war in 2023 and 2024, the podcast placed a strong focus on the background of the Middle East conflict from an anti-Zionist perspective, in particular with the 16-part series Thawra, a 40-hour discussion with historian Abdel Razzaq Takriti on Arab radical movements. The episodes on the Middle East conflict had reached a quarter of a million listeners by August 2024.

In 2023, Denvir described the podcast as an attempt to continue the intellectual and political work of Mike Davis (who was a guest on the podcast several times), who died in 2022:

“Davis was [...] an intellectual who attempted to articulate an analysis of the totality of this country and the world. [...] His inevitably quixotic but utterly necessary attempt to connect all the dots is a model for what I'm trying to accomplish with The Dig—again, by listening to others and asking questions. He ruthlessly critiqued everything while insisting on hopefulness.”

— Daniel Denvir: Interview with Daniel Steinmetz-Jenkins

== Distribution and influence ==
The podcast has been downloaded over 20 million times (as of December 2025). According to the weekly newspaper The Nation, it is considered to be “an essential part of a radical education” and one of the most popular podcasts on the American left. The Guardian describes the podcast as “a hub of the left-wing media ecosystem.” Andrew Epstein, a staff member of the successful campaign team of socialist New York City Mayor Zohran Mamdani, notes: “In my world of left-wing organizers, former academics, and political campaign staffers [...] the show is incredibly influential.”
