= Dig (magazine) =

Children's archaeology magazine

Dig was a children's archaeology magazine, published by Cricket Media and associated with the Archaeological Institute of America. The magazine targeted children aged nine to fourteen.

== History and profile ==
Dig was founded in 1999 by the Archaeological Institute of America, with offices in New York's financial district. The AIA had commissioned magazine editor and writer Stephen Hanks, who at the time was working for Scholastic News, to create a prototype for a children's archaeology magazine. With New York-based magazine art director Mooki Saltzman doing the design, Hanks presented an eight-page prototype to the AIA Board of Directors during the summer of 1998. The board approved a January 1999 launch of a 48-page bi-monthly magazine.

Under Hanks' guidance as editorial director, DIG won multiple awards from the Association of Educational Publishers and was acclaimed as one of America's best magazine launches of 1999 by Temple University's "Acres of Diamonds" Award. Hanks was also featured in a full-page profile in the New York Daily News.

Although a critical success, circulation and advertising revenue were not large enough for the AIA to sustain publishing Dig, so the magazine was sold in late 2001 to the Peterborough, New Hampshire company Cobblestone Publishing.

The magazine was published several times per year, and most issues were based on the theme of archaeological finds from various countries. It illustrated what archaeologists have found, and also explored the cultural, scientific, and architectural accomplishments of the societies that left these artifacts. Themes included "Who Were the First Americans?" in April 2007, "Australia: Land of the Unknown" (April 2006), and "Machu Piccu" (November 2005). In other issues, the theme might be a broad cultural constant between several ancient civilizations, such as "For the Love of Money" in March 2007, "Disaster" in Feb. 2007, and "High Fashion" in May 2006. Most issues also included puzzles and hands-on projects.

Dig ceased publication in 2014 and was replaced by Dig into History, which combined Dig and Calliope magazines.
