= Digger wasp =

The common name digger wasp is a broad term which may refer to any member of the wasp families that make underground nests:

- Bembicidae, including Bembix (sand wasps)
- Crabronidae, including Oxybelus (spiny digger wasps)
- Philanthidae, including Philanthus (beewolves)
- Sphecidae, including Sphex (digger wasps) and Ammophila (sand wasps)
