= Digging (disambiguation) =

Digging is the act of removing solid material from a surface. Digging may also refer to:

- "Digging", a poem by Seamus Heaney
- "Digging...", a poem by Gopi Kottoor

== See also ==
- Diggings, a colloquial term for the gold rush locations in Australia and the United States
- Dig (disambiguation)
