= Spider (magazine) =

American children's literary magazine

Spider is an illustrated literary magazine designed for children from 6 to 9 years old. Started in January 1994, the magazine is published in the United States by the Cricket Magazine Group, which is owned by the Carus Publishing Company. The headquarters of the magazine is in Chicago, Illinois.

== Internet ==
Since June 2008, Cricket, Spider, and Ladybug magazines have had websites for their child readers and families.

== Awards ==
The magazine was a 2007 and 2008 winner of a Gold Parents' Choice Award for excellence in children's publishing.
