= Cobblestone (magazine) =

American children's magazine

- Categories: Children's magazine
- Frequency: 9 per year
- Founder: Hope Pettegrew and Frances Nankin
- Founded: 1979
- Company: Carus Publishing Company
- Country: United States
- Based in: Chicago
- Language: English
- Website: cricketmedia.com
- ISSN: 0199-5197

Cobblestone is a magazine that is published by Cricket Media and part of Carus Publishing Company.

== History and profile ==
Cobblestone Magazine was established in 1979. The founders were Hope Pettegrew and Frances Nankin, New Hampshire natives. The first issue was published in January 1980.

Carus Publishing Company acquired the magazine in 2000. The publisher of the magazine, Cobblestone Publishing, became part of its Cricket Magazine Group publications. Until January 2015 Cobblestone Magazine was headquartered in Peterborough, New Hampshire.

Cobblestone Magazine is aimed at children ages between 9 and 14 and focuses on American history, especially the history of early America. Each issue is 48 pages and focuses on a particular subject, such as John Adams or the Battle of Gettysburg. Each issue contains several historical articles on the subject, as well as fun activities related to the culture of the times.
