= Marianne Carus =

American children's magazine publisher (1928–2021)

- Born: June 16, 1928; Dieringhausen, Germany
- Died: March 3, 2021 (aged 92); Peru, Illinois
- Known for: Cricket Magazine

Marianne Carus (June 16, 1928 – March 3, 2021) was a German-born American editor and publisher known for creating the children's magazine Cricket.

Responding to educators who were using the basic readers created by her and her husband, Carus began outlining a children's literary magazine. She was inspired by St. Nicholas, started in 1873 and edited by Mary Mapes Dodge. Carus was not personally knowledgeable about publishing so she brought together a team of experts to act as her editorial board including Eleanor Cameron, Virginia Haviland, Clifton Fadiman, Lloyd Alexander, Isaac Bashevis Singer, and art director Trina Schart Hyman. Unlike other children's publications of the time, the magazine had hand-drawn covers which included a volume and issue number.

Carus served as editor-in-chief of the publications for more than 35 years. She was known for encouraging children to write in or submit drawings to the publication, and would often hire people from other types of publications and train them to work in children's literature. She was also highly competitive as to which submissions she would accept for publication. Cricket Magazine Group expanded to publish Ladybug in 1990, Spider in 1994, Babybug in 1995 and Cicada in 1998. While other children's publications at the time avoided topics that could be considered "edgy," Carus tried to make Cricket reflect gender and ethnic diversity, often specifically soliciting stories about girls to balance the existing stories she had.

Carus founded Carus Publishing Company in 1973 which owned Open Court Publishing Company as well as Cricket Magazine Group, and Cobblestone Publishing. The company was acquired by ePals Corporation in 2011.

== Early life and education ==
Carus was born on June 16, 1928, in Dieringhausen, Germany, to Dr. Günther Sondermann (a descendant of Johann Wilhelm Sondermann), an ophthalmologist, and Elisabeth Sondermann (née Gesell). She grew up in Gummersbach, Germany. She married Milton Blouke Carus on March 3, 1951. The couple had three children and often spent time in Germany. Carus was unsatisfied with the overly simplistic books their children brought home from school in the United States compared to what they were reading in German schools. Together with her husband, whose family owned Open Court Publishing Company, she created a set of books called the Open Court Basic Readers for elementary school students learning to read in 1963.
