= List of pet magazines =

Following is a list of pet magazines.

== Dogs ==
- THE NEW BARKER
- Dog Fancy
- Dog World
- Dogster
- FIDO Friendly
- Modern Dog (magazine)
- Doggozila (magazine)

== Cats ==
- Cat Fancy
- Catster

== Fish ==
- Aquarium Fish International
- Aquarium Fish Magazine
- Tropical Fish Hobbyist

== Ferrets ==
- Ferrets Magazine
