= Sassafras Patterdale =

American author and dog trainer (born 1984)

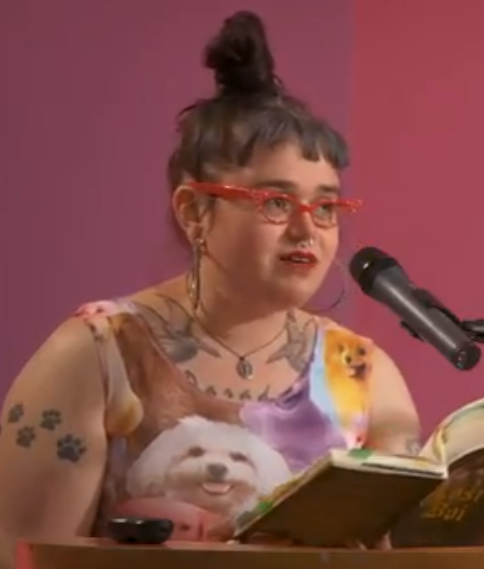
- Patterdale reading at the San Francisco Public Library in 2015
- Born: May 16, 1984 (age 42)
- Education: Goddard College (MFA)
- Occupations: Author; dog trainer
- Writing career
- Notable awards: Betty Berzon Emerging Writer Award (2013)
- Website: sassafraspatterdale.com

Sassafras Patterdale (formerly Lowrey; born May 16, 1984) is an American author and dog trainer. In 2013, the Lambda Literary Foundation awarded them (Note: Patterdale uses both they/them and ze/hir pronouns. This article uses they/them for consistency.) the Betty Berzon Emerging Writer Award.

== Personal life ==
In the early 2000s, at age 17, Patterdale came out as non-binary and genderqueer. Patterdale was homeless as a teenager and no longer has a relationship "with the family that raised [them]".

In 2024, Patterdale divorced their partner of nineteen years. They live with their dogs in Portland, Oregon.

== Education ==
Patterdale received a Master of Fine Arts in Fiction from Goddard College.

== Career ==
=== Dog trainer ===
Patterdale is an All Star Trainer of the Year-certified trick dog instructor, and American Kennel Club Canine Good Citizen and Tricks evaluator. They "[have] trained and competed in canine sports from dog agility and rally obedience to canine parkour and tricks and has appeared on AKC TV and BBC radio". They are authorized by American Kennel Club.

=== Writer ===
Patterdale's writing includes characters of varied genders who use a variety of pronouns. They said, "I'm equally committed to normalizing the presence of non-binary characters as I am to non-binary language in literature."

Their writing has been published through traditional and self-publishing means. Discussing the reason why they sometimes opt for self-publishing, They noted, "Although traditional publishing has made a lot of progress in prioritizing and uplifting #OwnVoices work, many marginalized writers, including LGBTQ writers and writers of color, are still locked out of lucrative book deals. Even if traditional publishers buy books, they may not pour resources into them, leaving the labor of promoting and marketing to the authors." They continued, "Self-publishing can also mean not having to adjust a story or voice to fit with a publisher's vision... [it] can be the best way to reach readers who need them most, and to maintain artistic control over their projects."

Aside from full-length books and anthology contributions, Patterdale has written for HuffPost, The New York Times, Publishers Weekly, Wired, the American Kennel Club, Narratively, Dogster, Modern Dog, Whole Dog Journal, Bark, Catapult, Catster, Lambda Literary, and others.

Patterdale has taught creative writing at LitReactor and the New York City Center for Fiction, as well as led the Queer Shelter Project Stories Workshop as part of the arts programming for Queers for Economic Justice. they have also mentored for Association of Writers & Writing Programs twice and "provides writing coaching to private clients".

== Selected awards and honors ==
Year	Work	Award	Result	Ref.
2017	A Little Queermas Carol	Lambda Literary Award for Science Fiction, Fantasy, and Horror	Finalist	
2016	Lost Boi	American Library Association's Over the Rainbow Project List	Selection	
2016	Lost Boi	Lambda Literary Award for Transgender Fiction	Finalist	
2013	Self	Betty Berzon Emerging Writer Award	Recipient	
2011	Kicked Out	Lambda Literary Award for Anthology	Finalist	
2011	Kicked Out	ALA Rainbow Book List	Top 10	
2011	Kicked Out	American Library Association's Over the Rainbow Project List	Top 11	

== Publications ==
=== Anthology contributions ===
- Visible: A Femmethology, Volume One, edited by Jennifer Clare Burke (2009)
- Trans/Love: Radical Sex, Love & Relationships Beyond the Gender Binary, edited by Morty Diamond (2011)
- No Safewords: A Marketplace Fan Anthology, edited by Laura Antoniou (2013)
- The Complete Guide to Writing for Young Adults, edited by Gabrielle Harbowy (2014)
- The Queer South: LGBTQ Writers on the American South, edited by Douglas Ray (2014)
- Believe Me: How Trusting Women Can Change the World, edited by Jessica Valenti and Jaclyn Friedman (2020)
- Between Certain Death and a Possible Future: Queer Writing on Growing Up with the AIDS Crisis, edited by Mattilda Bernstein Sycamore (2021)

=== Anthologies edited ===
- Kicked Out (2010)
- Leather Ever After: An Anthology of Kinky Fairy Tales (2013)

=== Select articles ===
- "A Guide To Non-binary Pronouns And Why They Matter", in HuffPost (2017)
- "I Was A Homeless Teen; My Dog, Mercury, Helped Me Through It", in HuffPost (2017)
- "Lost Cause: On Estrangement and Chosen Family", in Catapult (2018)
- "4 Things Pet Owners Regret Doing When Buying a Home", in Apartment Therapy (2019)
- "Confessions of a Misfit on the Dog Show Circuit", in Narratively (2019)
- "5 New Year's Resolutions You Can Make for Your Dog", in Apartment Therapy (2020)
- "Before You Adopt: Planning a Lifelong Commitment to Your Pet's Health", in The New York Times (2020)
- "The Dog Park is Bad, Actually", in The New York Times (2020)
- "Helping Your Dog Survive During a Quarantine", in The New York Times (2020)
- "I Shopped Around for a House That Was Perfect for My Dogs. Yes, Really", in Apartment Therapy (2020)
- "Robot Dogs Can Help Seniors Cope—Especially During Covid", in Wired (2020)
- "The Tech That Can Help Keep Your Dogs Happy and Healthy", in Wired (2020)
- "What We Can Learn From European Dog Culture", in The New York Times (2020)
- "How to Throw Your Dog a Birthday Party, According to a Professional Trainer", in Apartment Therapy (2021)
- "I Turned a Spare Bedroom into a Dog Gymnasium Using Everyday Household Items", in Apartment Therapy (2021)
- "In Praise of Positive Reinforcement for Your Pets", in Wired (2021)

=== Standalone books ===
- Roving Pack (2012)
- Lost Boi (2015)
- A Little Queermas Carol (2016)
- Healing/Heeling (2019)
- Tricks in the City: For Daring Dogs and the Humans that Love Them (2019)
- William To The Rescue (2019)
- Chew This Journal: An Activity Book for You and Your Dog (2020)
- Pandemic Pets (2020)
- Dog Training Planner (2021)
- With Me (2021)
