= Bird Talk =

Bi-monthly American magazine for bird owners

- Editor: Jessica Pineda
- Categories: Animal Magazine
- Frequency: Bi-Monthly
- Publisher: Parrot Publications
- First issue: 1982
- Final issue: January 2019
- Company: Parrot Publications, Inc.
- Country: United States
- Based in: Irvine, California
- Language: English
- Website: NewBirdTalk.com
- ISSN: 0891-771X
- OCLC: 607318848

Bird Talk was a bi-monthly magazine for bird owners and enthusiasts published by Parrot Publications, Inc. Each issue had articles which were generally focused around a specific topic, as well as several regular features. The topics varied from bird care, training, behavior, and health to discussion of new products and bird food recipes or raising a colony of mealworms.

== Overview ==
Thomas A. Bell published the first issue of Bird Talk magazine in 1982. The "Fledgling Editor" was Dave Bonnot. The "Fledgling Art Director" was Dianne Shannon. The fledgling magazine experienced publishing issues which forced its sale. The publisher offered Bird Talk magazine to Fancy Publications, a small publishing company, which also published Dog Fancy, Cat Fancy and Horse Fancy magazines. Under Fancy Publications, Bird Talk was redesigned and published, in April 1984, with a new focus to provide bird care information to pet bird owners. The redesigned issued introduced new columns including Watch the Birdie and Causes and Cures. Its motto is Dedicated To Better Care For Pet Birds. The current editor Laura Doering, has worked for Bird Talk since 1998. In November 2006, Bird Talk launched their website BirdChannel.com. One of Bird Talk's recent features interactive contests was the World's First Bird Dance-Off, where bird owners sent in videos of their birds dancing and BirdChannel.com visitors voted on the Top Bird Dancer. ZuPreem sponsored the contest and Avian Fashions was the dance-off Official Outfitters. Bird Talk abruptly ceased publication with the September 2012 issue.

In early 2018, the company Parrot Publications, Inc., purchased the trademark for Bird Talk to start publishing the magazine again. The latest issue was published in May 2018.

The new company, Parrot Publications, became unavailable. No new magazines were issued after January 2019, the subscription page is down, and there are no responses to email or to Facebook posts. The magazine seems to be out of business.
