= Kicked Out =

Kicked Out may refer to:

- Kicked Out (film), a 1918 short comedy film
- Kicked Out (book), a 2010 anthology compiled and edited by Sassafras Lowrey
