= Flash Gordon (disambiguation) =

Flash Gordon is a science fiction hero.

Flash Gordon may also refer to:

- A 1935 26-episode Flash Gordon radio serial
- Flash Gordon (serial), a 1936 serial film
- Flash Gordon (1954 TV series), a 1954 live-action television series
- The New Adventures of Flash Gordon, a 1979-1982 animated television series
- Flash Gordon (film), a 1980 science fiction film
  - Flash Gordon (soundtrack), an album by Queen, the soundtrack album of the 1980 film
- Flash Gordon: The Greatest Adventure of All, a 1982 animated television film
- Flash Gordon, a 1983 video game by 20th Century Fox
- Flash Gordon (1983 video game), a 1983 Atari 2600 game by Fox Video Games
- Flash Gordon (1986 video game), a 1986 computer game by Mastertronic
- Flash Gordon (1996 TV series), a 1996 animated television series
- Flash Gordon (2007 TV series), a 2007 live-action television series from the Sci Fi Channel
- Flash Gordon (pinball), a pinball machine produced by Bally

== People ==
- Joe Gordon (born 1915), nicknamed Flash, US baseball player
- Tom Gordon (born 1967), nicknamed Flash, US baseball player
- Gordon Watson (footballer, born 1971), nicknamed Flash, former English professional footballer
- Donald "Flash" Gordon (1920–2010), World War II flying ace
- Flash Gordon (physician), physician and author
- Josh Gordon, nicknamed Flash, American wide receiver for the Seattle Seahawks
