= WildBird =

Defunct birding magazine

- Categories: Wildlife
- Frequency: Bimonthly
- Total circulation: 79,095 (2011)
- Founded: 1987
- Final issue: 2012
- Company: BowTie Inc.
- Country: United States
- Based in: Irvine, California
- Language: English
- Website: www.wildbirdmagazine.com
- ISSN: 0892-5534

WildBird was a bimonthly magazine about birding or birdwatching in North America, Central America and South America. It was published by BowTie Inc.

== History and profile ==
WildBird was founded in 1987, as a monthly magazine and changed to every other month in 2000. BowTie Inc. published it from the Irvine, California, office. The Statement of Ownership in the January/February 2010 issue shows a paid circulation of more than 81,000 copies.

WildBird’s slogan was “birding at its best,” and the articles talk about birding at home and away from home. Like one reader wrote,

“This is a magazine for those who enjoy feeding birds, setting up avian habitats in the backyard, watching birds, and identifying birds. We are guilty of all those pursuits, and a magazine such as Wild Bird just feeds our passion. It's a bimonthly magazine with informative articles embellished by striking bird photography. Its mission is to educate readers with useful details about North American birds and birding. Its ultimate goal is the preservation and well being of North America's avian species.”

The magazine usually had four feature articles in every issue, and it had three columnists and other regular writers. In some sections, readers could send photos that might be published, and they can enter contests like the photo contest and the Birder of the Year contest. The photo contest gives away a Canon digital camera, and the Birder of the Year winner gets a Swarovski binocular and a birding trip.

== Editors and contributors ==
Editors
1987–1992 Bob Carpenter
1992–1998 Paul M. Konrad
1998–1999 John Hollon
1999–2002 June Kikuchi
2002–present Amy K. Hooper

Contributors
High-profile birders regularly contribute articles and photographs. The advisory board includes Pete Dunne, Kenn Kaufman, Arthur Morris and Brian E. Small as well as Shawneen Finnegan, Kevin T. Karlson and Peter Stangel. The magazine has submission guidelines for freelance writers and photographers. The magazine's articles sometimes give tips from the photographers, like the woodpecker setup by Alan Murphy.

== Special issues ==
WildBird has special issues every year about hummingbirds and raptors. In 2009, the May/June issue was the 19th hummer issue, and the July/August issue was the 17th birds of prey issue. The September/October issue always shows the winners of the photo contest.

== Related magazines ==
The editors also did a magazine called “Popular Birding Series: Backyard Birding” in 2008 and “Popular Birding Series: Hummingbirds.” They're not subscription magazines and are only in stores or for sale on Animal Network.
