= MaryJane Butters =

American farmer and author

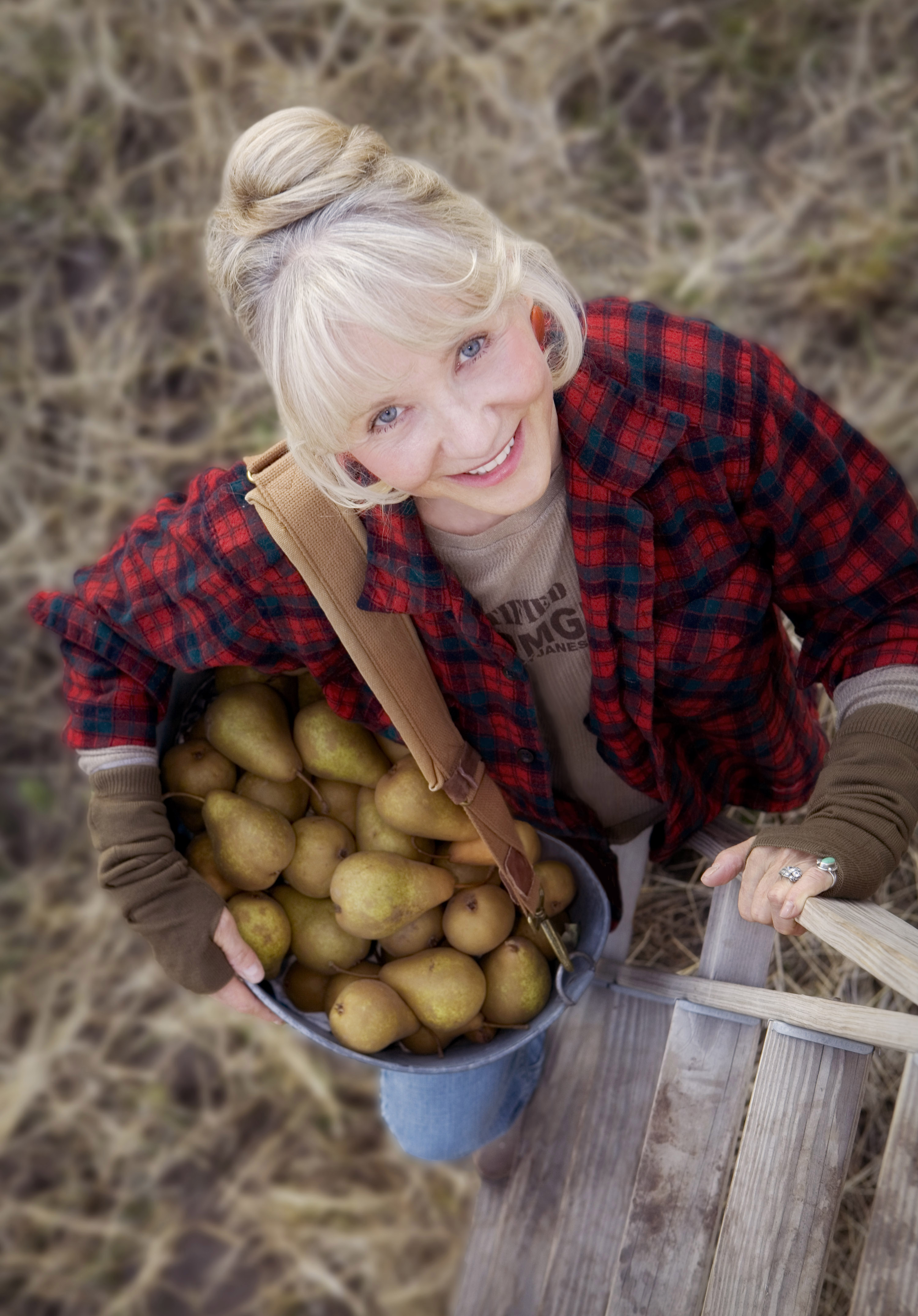
MaryJane Butters from the cover of her MaryJane Farm Magazine Oct/Nov 2011 issue.

Mary-Jane Butters (born May 6, 1953) is an American organic farmer, author, environmental activist, food manufacturer, and the publisher of MaryJane Farm magazine. She lives with her family on a farm in Moscow, Idaho. Her farm and business were featured in the December 1995 issue of National Geographic magazine.

== Daily life ==
Butters was the second youngest of five children born to Mormon parents Allen and Helen Butters. The family made their own food, made their own clothing, and camped on weekends, where they fished and hunted. Butters credits her father with teaching her carpentry, organic gardening and her mother with teaching her homemaking, fishing, and camping.

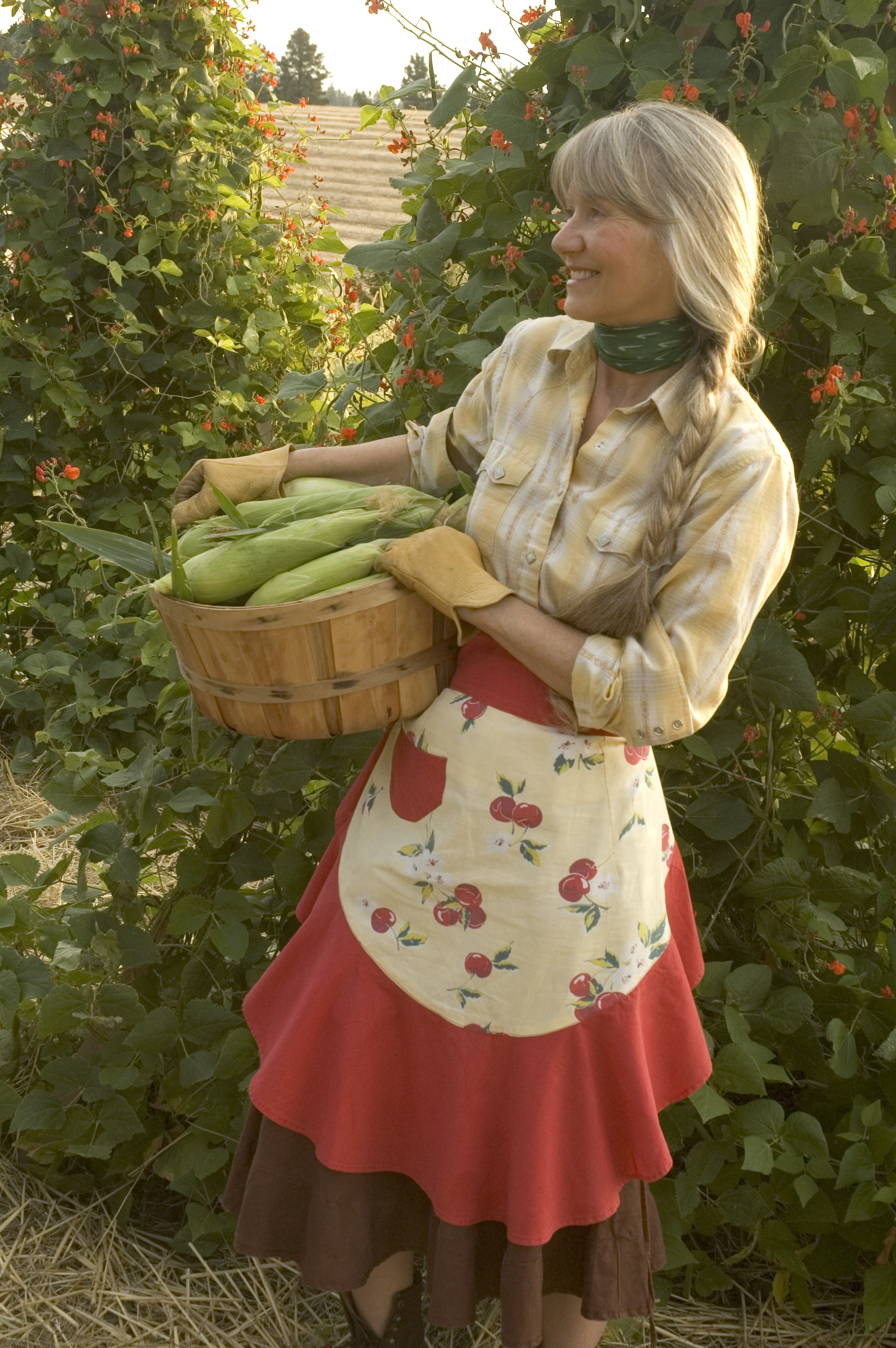
MaryJane harvests corn at her farm in Moscow, ID.

In 1971, Butters graduated from Ben Lomond High School in Ogden, Utah. In 1972, Butters took a job at a mountaintop lookout tower in Weippe, Idaho, as a Clearwater-Potlatch Timber Protective Association fire watcher. She briefly studied forestry at Utah State University, but dropped out. In 1974, Butters was one of the three women who became the first female wilderness rangers in the U.S.A, maintaining trails and cleaning sheepherder camps in the Uinta Mountains of northern Utah. After that summer, she earned her carpentry proficiency certificate and was hired as the only woman on a crew building houses at Hill Air Force Base. Early in 1976, Butters became the first woman station guard at the remote Moose Creek Ranger Station. There she met Emil Keck, a fire-control officer, and construction-crew chief who lived at the wilderness station year round, and who became her mentor and the namesake for her second child.

== Career ==
=== Paradise Farm ===
In 1986, Butters purchased a five-acre homestead and farmhouse at the base of Paradise Ridge in Moscow, Idaho, for $45,000. The 1905 farmhouse was destroyed by fire in 1996, but the farm continues to be the headquarters for Butters' businesses.

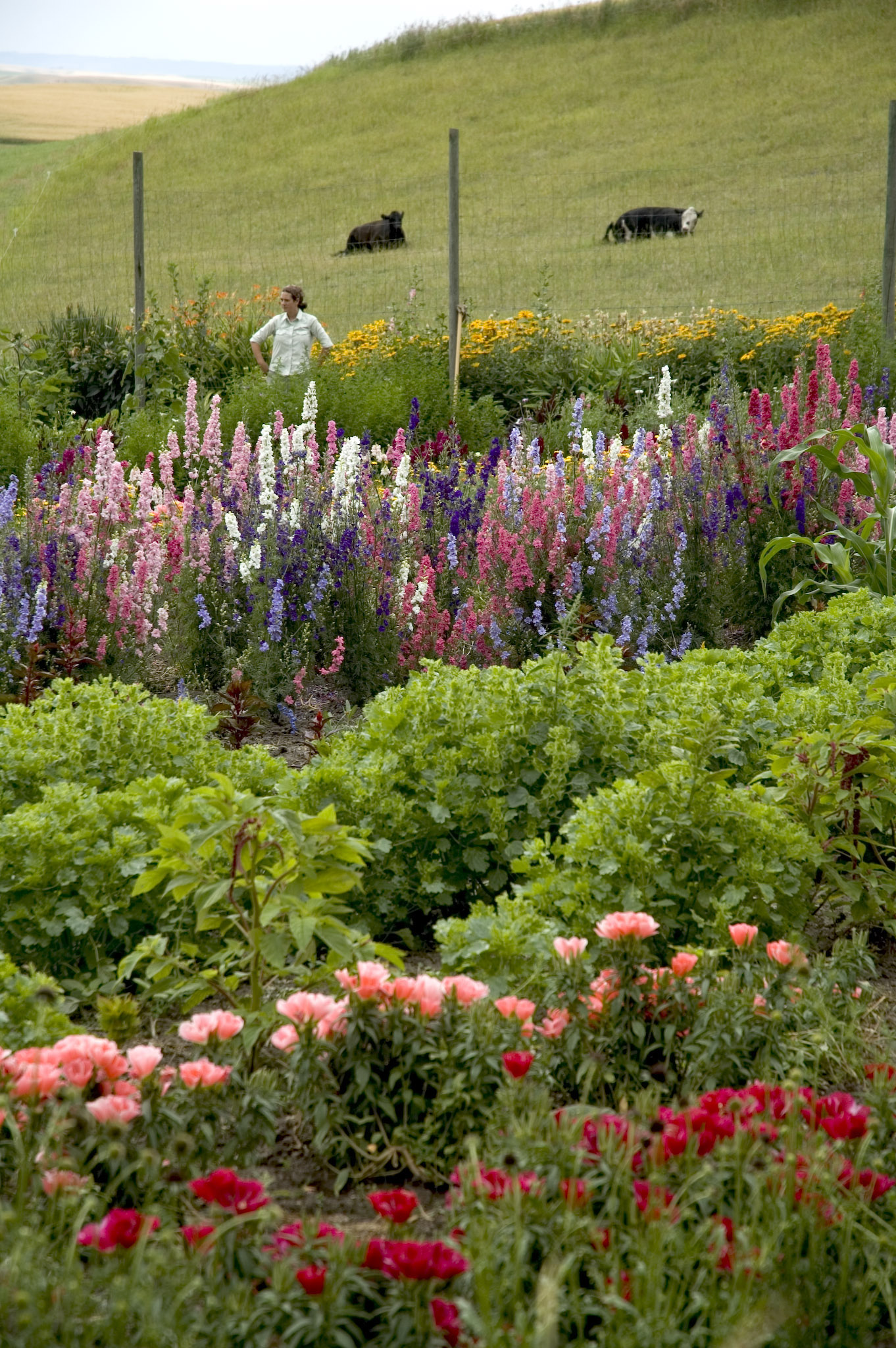
MaryJanesFarm is located in Moscow, ID.

In 1989, Butters met a farmer who grew organic, pest-resistant "desi" garbanzo beans that had proven to be unmarketable. Butters bought and experimented with the beans, eventually developing a dried falafel mix that she began to market under the Paradise Farm label in 1990. She began marketing other unused organic crops and incorporated her food business in 1993 as "Paradise Farm Organics, Inc." Today, she grosses more than $1 million annually from her line of over 60 dried organic foods. Butters is the company's president, and her husband, Nick Ogle, oversees production. In 1997, the company reached an agreement with Mountain Safety Research, a division of REI, to label and market her products.

By 2001, the black-and-white food catalog she had been printing since 1996 had evolved into a self-published magazine, MaryJane's Farm, and customers placing food orders over $50 received free subscriptions. Butters has since branded her farm and her food line with the name "MaryJane's Farm" in order to "create loyalty and trust." In 2007, the company was profitable for the first time.

In 1993, Paradise Farm changed its name to Paradise Farm Organics, Inc. to reflect its incorporation. In 1999, Butters took Paradise Farm Organics, Inc. public in an initial stock offering. Shares in the company were valued at $9 per share with a minimum purchase of 600 shares. At the time, the company was attempting to raise $500,000 to build a facility for shipping dried-food orders, and was still recovering from the 1996 fire, which had left her with $100,000 in credit-card debt. The company raised the funds with 45 investors, who receive "dividends" in the form of fresh produce, free-range eggs, and stay at her bed and breakfast. Butters has said she prefers supportive shareholder relationships to bank loans, which she thinks tie farmers to prolonged obligations with legal entities that have no interest in the future of small farmers.

=== MaryJane's Farm magazine and "Everyday Organic" newspaper column ===
MaryJane's Farm is an organic-focused lifestyle magazine based on farm life with Mary Jane. The magazine began in 1996 as a mail-order catalog. Later editions included gardening articles, recipes, farmer bios, homemaking projects, photography, and essays. In 2008, Butters partnered with Belvoir Media Group to re-launch the magazine as a bi-monthly. Belvoir marketed the publication to environmentally- and health-conscious women between the ages of 25 and 49. Advertisers include Mountain Rose Herbs and Eden Foods. As of 2022, the magazine claims a circulation of 150,000 and is sold at Walmart, Whole Foods Markets, and Barnes & Noble.

The magazine also operates a website to sell its product lines to readers. Marketed items include dried foods, products for the home and garden, crafting supplies, clothing, and household goods. Some items are made by artisans in Project F.A.R.M. (First-class American Rural Made), an organization Butters created to support rural businesses. The website includes a chatroom, "Farmgirl Connection", for current and aspiring women farmers. Butters says that the chatroom is her attempt to replicate the support system she witnessed between her mother and other Mormon women in Utah.

For three years, Butters also wrote a weekly "back-to-the-land" syndicated newspaper column, "MaryJane's Everyday Organic", which was distributed through United Feature Syndicate. The column provided concrete suggestions for green and organic living and was targeted at current and aspiring women farmers who wished to have good fields and crops.

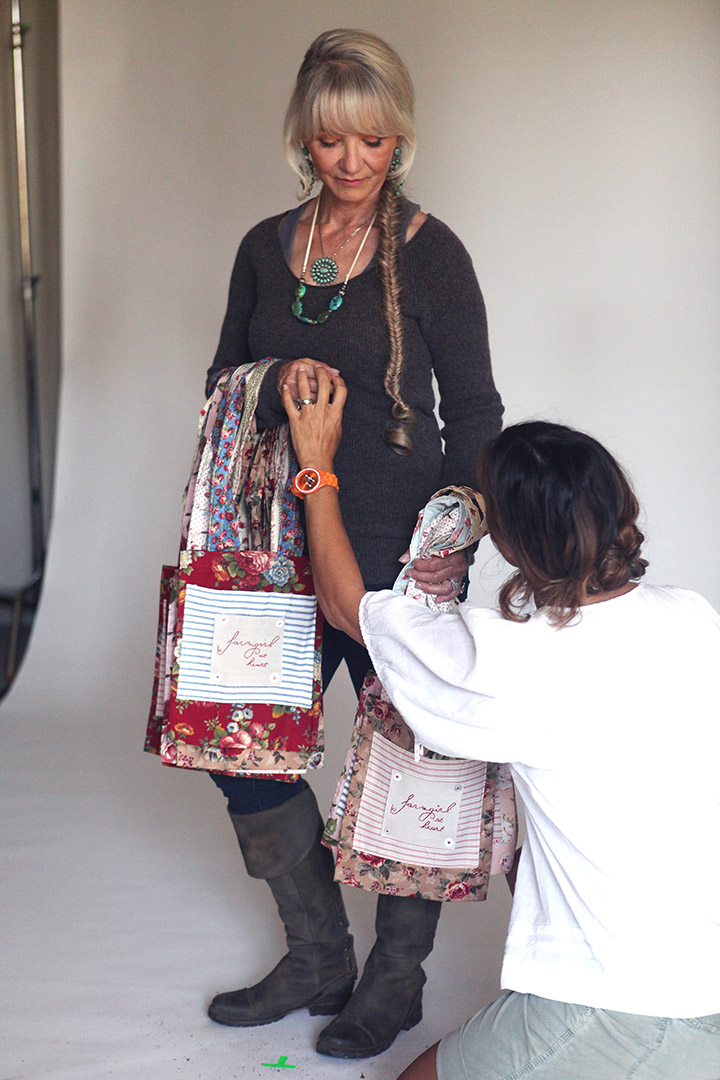
MaryJane poses with products from her brainchild Project F.A.R.M. (First-class American Rural Made), for a feature in More magazine.

=== MaryJane Farm Bed & Breakfast ===
Butters opened a bed & breakfast on the farm in 2004. Butters has used her bed & breakfast to diversify her business and promote the agritourism industry and “glamping"—glamour camping—a term now widely used in the media. Butters’ brand and merchandising rely on the notions of “glamorous camping” and feminized outdoor activities in a marketing approach she has described as “the juxtaposition of rugged and really pretty, grit and glam, diesel and absolutely darling.”

=== Pay Dirt Farm School ===
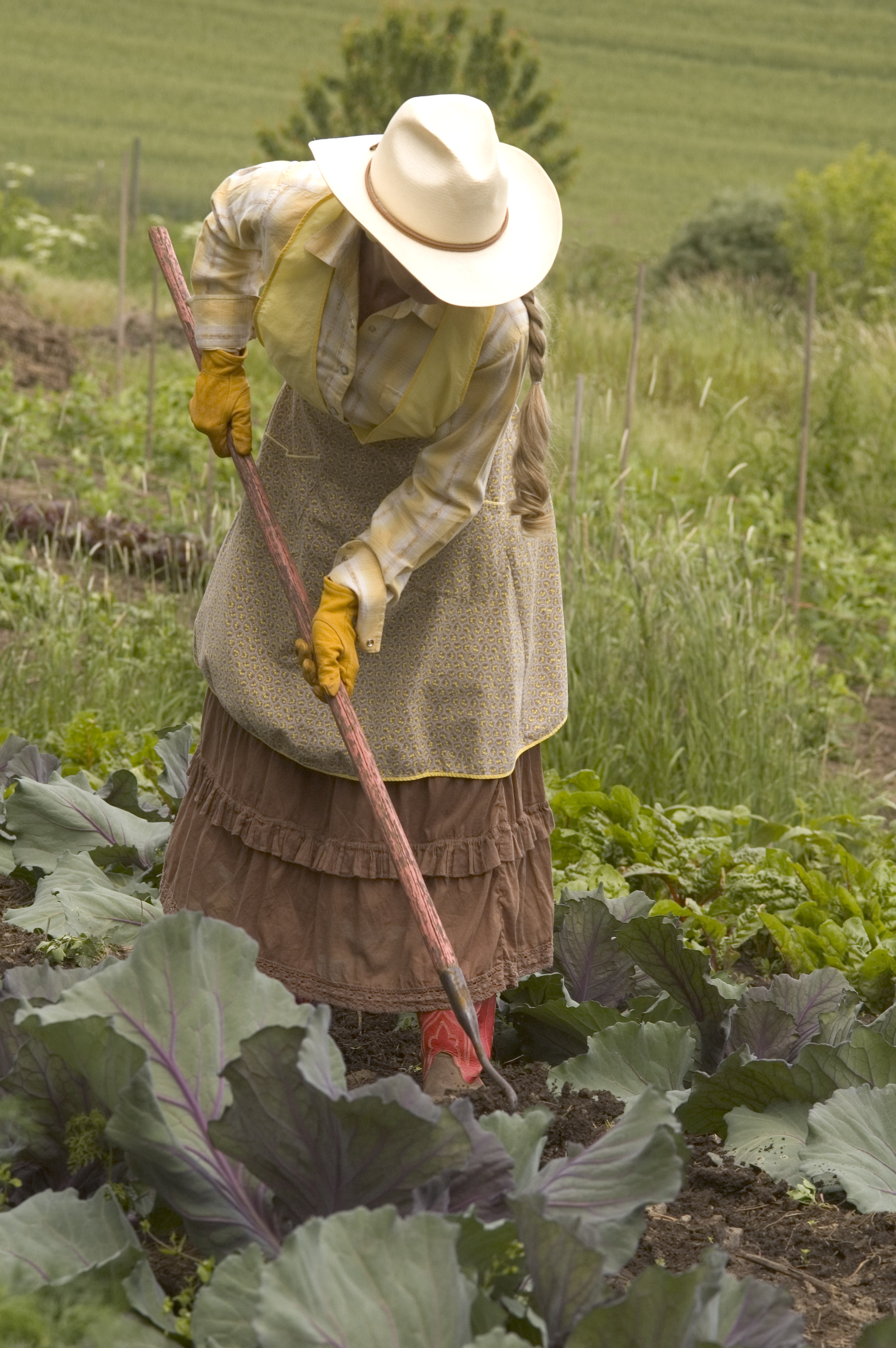
MaryJanesFarm is located on Paradise Ridge in Moscow, ID

In 1995, Butters founded a not-for-profit organization called Pay Dirt Farm School, designed to teach the business of organic farming to new farmers. Skills taught include chopping firewood, budgeting, composting, biofuel production, food preserving, and craft selling, and the curriculum is customized to the students’ interests.

=== The U-Pick Country Club ===
Butters also ran a u-pick membership organization. For a $100 fee and the cost of production, a household was given permission to collect produce and eggs from the greenhouses, fields, orchard, and chicken coop during daylight hours, seven days a week. Members could also gather flowers, picnic on the farm, or visit animals. Butters’ goal in starting the country club, according to son-in-law Lucas Rae, was to give others a chance to live out their “farm fantasy” and educate families about the source of their food. Butters has also said that she wanted to combat the culture of convenience food, which has “created a nutritional famine”.

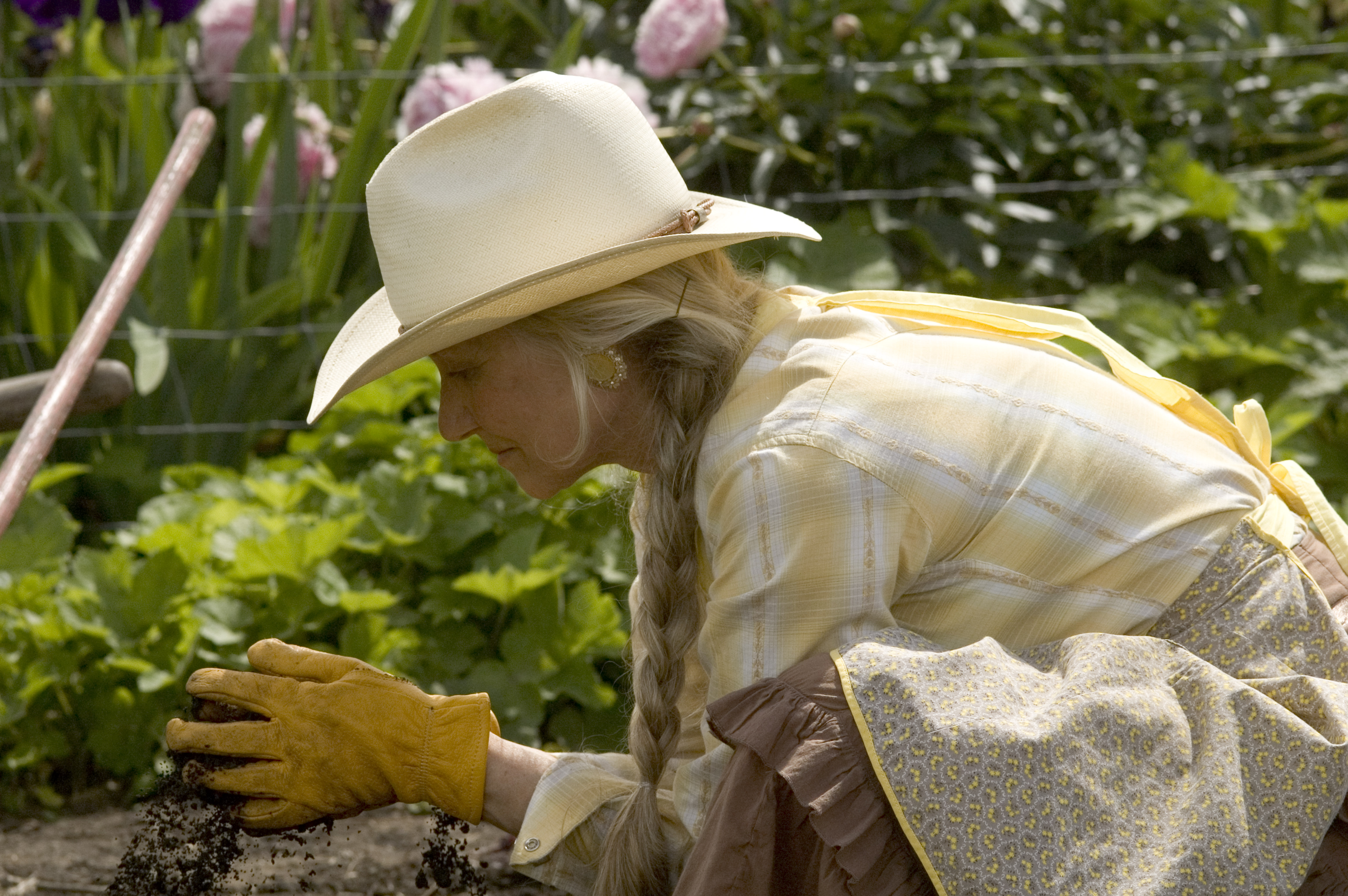
MaryJane at her farm in Moscow, ID.

=== Historic schoolhouse ===
MaryJane Butters and her husband, Nick Ogle, serve on the board of a group dedicated to preserving the historic schoolhouse where Ogle's mother attended classes. The school and the half acre of land it occupies are owned by members of the Blaine Community Association, and the space is used during the summer for parties, weddings, dances, and Quaker services throughout May, June, July, and August.

=== Historic flour mill ===
In 1997, MaryJane Butters and her husband, Nick Ogle, bought the organic flour business owned for 40 years by Joseph Barron in Oakes dale, Washington. The mill was the only one left of the many mills once standing in the area. The deal included an electric grinding mill machine and an old, four-story mill building with the original equipment. The grinding mill was moved to Moscow, Idaho, and is used by Butters to grind flours, cereals, and legumes for her line of dried organic foods. The historic mill building, built in 1890, is maintained in its original location. Butters has invested over $300,000 of her own funds toward restoring and preserving the mill.

== Books and Special Publications ==
Butters is the author of three Random House books: MaryJane's Ideabook, Cookbook, Lifebook: For the Farmgirl in All of Us, MaryJane's Stitching Room, and MaryJane's Outpost: Unleashing Your Inner Wild; four published by Gibbs Smith: Glamping with MaryJane, Milk Cow Kitchen, MaryJane's Cast Iron Kitchen, and Wild Bread: Sourdough Reinvented, Flour + Water + Air; and a self-published children's book, Moo-n Over Main Street Metropolis.

In the Fall of 2003, Butters signed a Random House book deal of $1.35 million for MaryJane's Ideabook, Cookbook, Lifebook: For the Farmgirl in All of Us. The book was published on May 24, 2005. Butters said the book was designed to be an uncomplicated manual for all things “farmgirl,” including making a wall tent, sewing a French seam, and staying in a lookout tower. The book's promotional tour included New York, Illinois, Vermont, Missouri, Indiana, and the Northwest.

MaryJane's Stitching Room was published on May 1, 2007, by Clarkson Potter. It includes essays and patterns relating to stitching handicrafts, including doilies, christening gowns, quilts, embroidery, and a how-to section on the basics of crochet.

MaryJane's Outpost, published by Clarkson Potter on June 24, 2008, is a romanticized and feminine look at camping, farming, and outdoor activities. Projects include building willow furniture, sleeping in outdoor canopy beds, using outdoor bathtubs, fishing, and hunting. The book is divided into three major sections: "Outbound" ... going out to the yard, engaging children in the outside world, making natural gifts, and creating family rituals, such as the simple act of having tea outside; "Outrigged" ... weekend camping and picnics, enjoying fishing or hunting; and "Outstepping" ... backpacking, enjoying wild foods, being safe in the water and wild, and outdoor jobs. The New York Times Book Review had this to say: "MaryJane Butters was once a single mother of two and a forest ranger, among other tough jobs. She is now an organic farmer, a grandmother, and an activist, living on a farm in Northern Idaho … MaryJane's Outpost: Unleashing Your Inner Wild is her third book, and it's a dilly. It lures readers outdoors with its Ralph Lauren styling (Ms. Butters' long blond braid and handsomely weathered face are complemented by an atmospheric tractor) and instructions on how to do all sorts of things, like make willow furniture and build an outdoor bed or bathtub … Ms. Butters has a way with words: Glamping, or glamour camping, one of her pet concepts, is about “the juxtaposition of rugged and really pretty, grit and glam, diesel and absolutely darling,” she writes."

Other books include Glamping with MaryJane (2012), Milk Cow Kitchen (2014), Moo-n Over Main Street Metropolis (2015), MaryJane's Cast Iron Kitchen (2017), and Wild Bread: Sourdough Reinvented, Flour + Water + Air(2018).

She wrote the introduction for the second edition of Traditional American Farming Techniques by Frank D. Gardner. Butters also wrote forewords for Costco’s Household Almanac, Women of the Harvest: Inspiring Stories of Contemporary Farmers, and Traditional American Farming Techniques. Butters was also featured as a bread-baking expert in the book The Experts’ Guide to Life at Home.

== Activism and awards ==
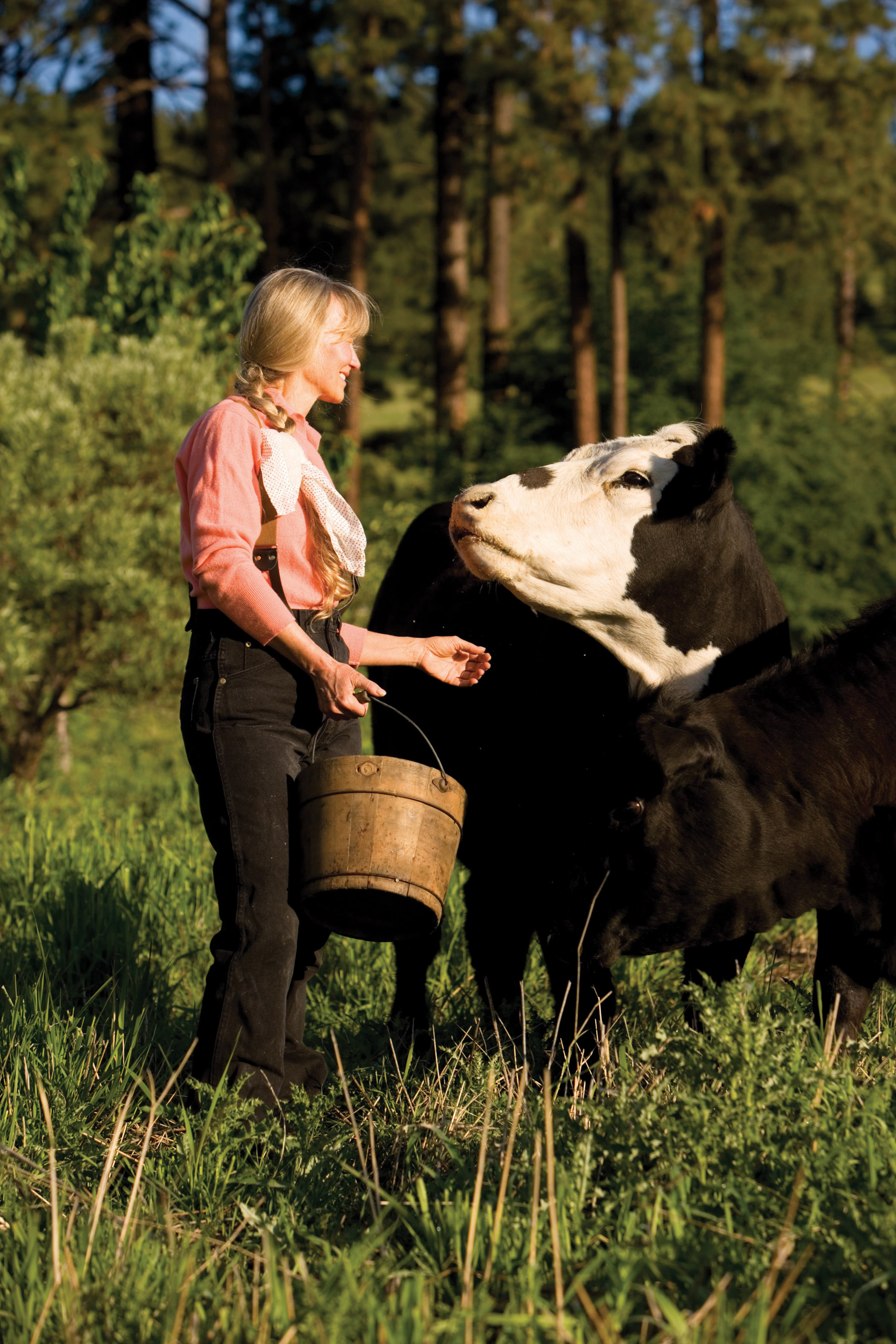
MaryJane Butters feeds livestock on her farm in Moscow in 2005

Butters became active in environmental issues in May 1986, when the accident at the Chernobyl Nuclear Power Plant in Ukraine dosed the Pacific Northwest with radioactive contamination. Butters called a public meeting to discuss an unsafe reactor similar to the one at Chernobyl at the Hanford Nuclear Reservation in nearby eastern Washington. She founded the Palouse-Clearwater Hanford Watch and succeeded in having the reactor shut down. She then founded and became director of the Palouse Clearwater Environmental Institute, taking on broader issues like water quality and transportation. The group began to discuss and address agricultural issues as well, marking the beginning of her public activism for organic farming methods. Between 1986 and 1990, under her leadership, the Institute's annual budget grew from $30 to $100,000 and garnered grants from national nonprofits. In 2011, PCEI celebrated their 25th anniversary of commitment to regional environmental issues.

In 2001, Butters received the Idaho Progressive Businessperson of the Year Award in recognition toward “social, economic, and environmental justice in Idaho”. In 2002, The Moscow Chamber of Commerce awarded Butters the Small Businessperson of the Year award for her business achievements, including the launch of her magazine.

In March 2003, The Western SARE (Sustainable Agriculture Research and Education) Administrative Council appointed Butters as their Organic Farming Representative and charged her with awarding over $4 million in grant funds to farmers, research, and nonprofit organizations in the Western U.S.

On March 14, 2008, Butters was recognized for her environmental activism with the Cecil D. Andrus Leadership Award for Sustainability and Conservation, awarded by a four-term Idaho Governor and former U.S. Secretary of the Interior. Andrus stated, “MaryJane Butters exemplifies the best of rural America—tireless commitment to stewardship of the land and community, a relentless entrepreneurial drive that recognizes no barriers, and boundless creativity and can-do spirit that inspires all who meet her and buy her products.”

Butters has served a term as chair of Idaho's Organic Advisory Council, as well as chair of Moscow's Health and Environment Commission. She helped to draft the first U.S. legislation denoting organic standards, and served as a spokesperson for Physicians for Social Responsibility. Laura Johnson of the Idaho Department of Agriculture has called Butters "a pioneer for organic production in Idaho."

Butters has also used her website and sales to support various causes. Some of the products sold on Butters’ website are made by artisans with Project F.A.R.M. (First-class American Rural Made), an organization Butters founded to help revitalize rural business. She organized a weeklong effort to raise funds for Courageous Women, a Haitian program designed to help homeless women and children after the 2010 earthquake. Butters also donated 20% of sales between March 17, 2011, and March 24, 2011 ($4,485), to the Japanese Red Cross following the 2011 earthquake and tsunami in Japan and 20% of sales between November 7, 2012, and November 14, 2012 ($2468), to the American Red Cross following 2012's super storm Sandy.

In December 2011, Butters learned an article in her magazine had been instrumental in helping rebuild the library at Rota after it was destroyed in December 1997 when Typhoon Paka hit the island. In response to a story in MaryJane Farm magazine, readers sent over 10,000 books to Rota.

In 2011-2012, More magazine, a women's lifestyle magazine, featured 10 women, each with a full-page article throughout the year, in a year-long campaign detailing companies started by women who were intent on creating jobs for other women. Butters was chosen for her Project F.A.R.M., as many of the project members' retail products on her website and her retail store “come with a face” so that the shopper can meet the person behind the product. Readers were invited to vote for one of the 10 women to receive the magazine's Job Genius Award and a $20,000 donation to help her organization's continued efforts.

== Personal life ==
MaryJane had two children with her first husband John McCarthy: Megan Butters (born 1979) and Emil McCarthy (born 1983). In 1986, she bought a five-acre farm in Idaho's Palouse region.

In 1993, Butters married farmer Nick Ogle, whose 600 acres bordered her farm on two sides, and the couple merged their landholdings. Family members who work on the farm include MaryJane's daughter Megan and son-in-law Lucas, and Ogle's son Brian and daughter-in-law Ashley. MaryJane has seven grandchildren.

MaryJane no longer identifies as Mormon. She once said, "For church, I have shareholders”.
