= Cat people and dog people =

Terms referring to pet preferences

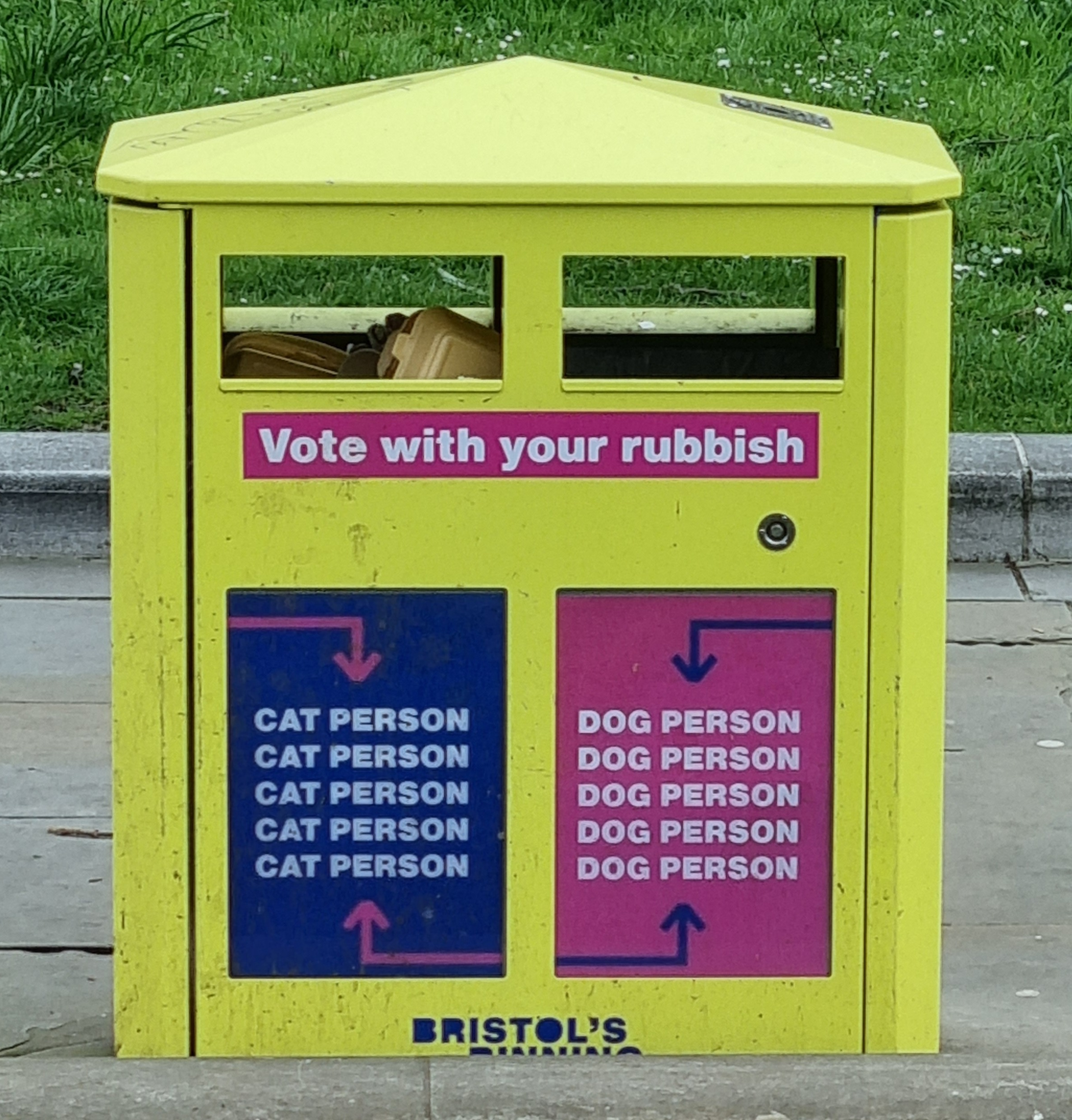
A rubbish bin in Bristol asking people to vote on whether they identify as a "cat person" or "dog person" by placing their rubbish in their preferred slot

The terms cat people and dog people refer to a person's domesticated pet animal preference. Through research completed at research institutions, it was found that there were differences in character and behaviour between those who prefer cats and those who prefer dogs. It was also found that some people base a significant portion of their identity around their affinity for either cats or dogs. This builds on the perceived dichotomy between cats and dogs as pets in society. In some cases, the two terms refer to people's self-identification, regardless of what pets they actually own, if any.

== Research ==
Research has shown a link between some personality traits and the type of domesticated animal owned. A 2010 study at the University of Texas found that those who identified as "dog people" tended to be more social and outgoing, whereas "cat people" tended to be more neurotic and "open", meaning creative, philosophical, or nontraditional. In a 2014 study at Carroll University, Wisconsin, by Denise Guastello, of the 600 people surveyed those who said they were dog lovers were found to be more energetic and outgoing, and tended to follow rules closely. Cat lovers were more introverted, open-minded and sensitive. Cat people also tended to be non-conformists, as well as scoring higher on intelligence tests than dog lovers. Guastello, a professor of psychology, stated the reasons behind these personality differences stem from the pet owners themselves and the particular environment they prefer. This is supported by the study completed by the psychology department at the University of Texas as it stated that the two species have "real and perceived differences" meaning that they display their own personalities that would be best suited to particular people.

== See also ==
- Cat lady, a usually derogatory depiction of a female cat person
