= Cat fancy =

Humans who like cats

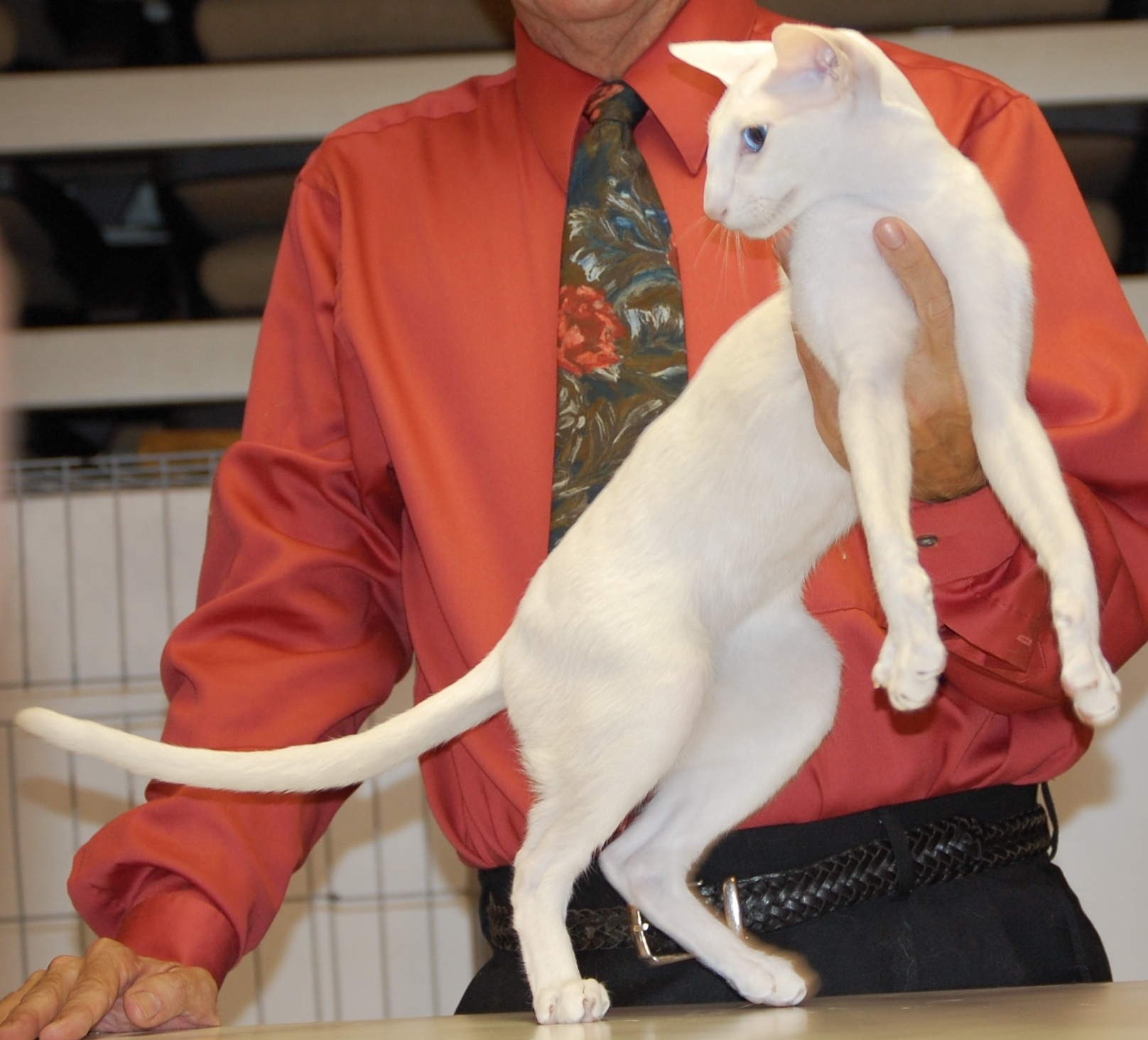
Oriental Shorthair shown at the 2008 Ft. Lauderdale Cat Show

Cat fancy describes the subculture that surrounds cat lovers and their hobbies involving the appreciation, promotion, showing, or breeding of cats. Animal fanciers of cats may refer to themselves as "cat people", "cat fanciers", or "cat lovers". The term "cat culture" has also been used, though is ambiguous. (Note: "Cat culture" more often refers to the animal culture that develops among cats living in close proximity to each other.)

== Description ==
Cat fanciers often wear clothing that identifies the wearer as a cat person. Some of them use cat puns such as meowvalous for 'marvelous', and pawsome for 'awesome', among many others. Cat terms such as "purrfect" have been used in article titles such as CBS Sacramento's article about two cats living alone in a Silicon Valley studio. According to a 2013 article by Psychology Today, self-identified cat people have more unusual and distinctive personality traits than dog people. The article also speculates that due to the sensitive nature of cats, some people of a similar nature would feel an affinity with cats.

== Around the world ==
In Pasadena, California, there is a cat festival called CatCon Worldwide. In 2018, the POP Cats Convention was held in Austin, Texas. There is a cat-themed cruise in the US (operating out of both Florida and Alaska), named Meow Meow Cruise, on which cat lovers can meet people with the same interest and have cat-themed parties.

In Morocco, cats are an inherent part of the country's culture. A 2018 article by Morocco World News suggested that people visiting there could think that the Moroccan person-to-cat ratio is fairly close to 1:1. Many Moroccans are said to love cats, and around the cities are piles of food and water trays left for the cats.

Cat Nation, a film by Tim Delmastro about cat fancy in Japan, features Chris Broad, a British YouTube personality. Broad made his way across the country where he documented the numerous strange and interesting cat-centric activities, including cat bars, cat temples, cat islands, and cat cafés.

Singapore has many cat lovers, cat cafés, and a cat museum. It had its first cat festival in 2018.

== Online ==
Cat subculture has transferred to and been amplified by the Internet, where it now flourishes. Cats, especially in the form of LOLcats, have long been a staple of Internet meme pictures. Cat fans often engage in a "Caturday" pastime (which originated on 4chan) of posting cat pictures on social media on Saturdays. There are numerous websites devoted to cats, such as The Catnip Times and The Purrington Post. There are many online cat-themed games, such as Cat-Opoly which is based on the board game Monopoly; players buy cats instead of properties.

== See also ==
- Animal fancy – Hobby regarding pets or domestic animals
- Cat lady – Cultural archetype of a woman who owns many cats
- Cats in ancient Egypt
- Human interaction with cats
- Kedi (2016 film) – 2016 Turkish documentary film by Ceyda Torun
- List of pet magazines § Cats
