= Belvoir Media Group =

American mass media company

- Country of origin: United States
- Headquarters location: Norwalk, Connecticut
- Key people: Robert Englander, Chairman & CEO; Timothy H. Cole, Chief Content Officer; Philip L. Penny, Chief Operating Officer; Ron Goldberg, Chief Financial Officer; Greg King, Chief Marketing Officer; Tom Canfield, Chief Circulation Officer
- Publication types: websites, newsletters, magazines and books
- Nonfiction topics: human health, pets, marine, aviation and organic farming
- Official website: belvoir.com

Belvoir Media Group is an American publisher of consumer-interest websites, newsletters, magazines and books. It publishes more than 30 monthly titles across a wide range of interest sectors, including human health, pets, marine, aviation and organic farming. Belvoir also publishes more than 100 special health reports, which are 30,000-word white papers. The company owns numerous websites published in concert with its many titles, and runs the publishing operations of Harvard Medical School and Tufts University.

== History ==
The progenitor of Belvoir Media Group was Belvoir Publications Inc. It was purchased by Belvoir Chairman Robert Englander in 1972, and consisted of a single title, Aviation Consumer. The publication was characterized by an advertising-free, subscriber-supported, high-value-content format modeled on Consumer Reports magazine that would become a Belvoir trademark.

Practical Sailor was acquired in 1975, and Aviation Safety, also for pilots, was launched in 1980. During this period, Belvoir acquired additional titles in the aviation and marine domains—Light Plane Maintenance, IFR (which stands for “instrument flight rules”), and Boatbuilder. The company started Powerboat Reports in 1989. An audio information service, Pilot's Audio Update, and a newsletter titled IFR Refresher were acquired in 1992.

The mid-1990s witnessed an energetic effort to apply Belvoir's ads-free, consumer newsletter format to the equine world. The company started Michael Plumb's Horse Journal, purchased The Horse (from Tufts University) and started John Lyon's Perfect Horse, a training and horse-care publication with a western horsemanship focus. Later equine acquisitions included Rodeo (formerly Spin to Win) and Trailrider. In 2012, The company sold the equine division to Active Interest Media.

In 2002, the company acquired AVweb.com, an online news and information service for pilots. In 2003, it acquired Kitplanes for builders of full-size aircraft.

== Health media ==
In 1998, Belvoir Media Group purchased the health newsletter division of the Toronto Star. The acquisition came with eight monthly publications: Cleveland Clinic Heart Advisor, Cleveland Clinic Men’s Health Advisor, Mount Sinai School of Medicine (now Icahn School of Medicine) Focus on Healthy Aging, Weill-Cornell Women’s Health Advisor, Weill-Cornell Women’s Food and Fitness Advisor (now Women’s Nutrition Connection), Cornell Dogwatch, and Cornell Catwatch. Since that period, the company has steadily started or acquired additional health titles including UCLA Healthy Years, Duke Medicine Health News (formerly published by the Massachusetts Medical Society, publishers of The New England Journal of Medicine), Environmental Nutrition, Cleveland Clinic Arthritis Advisor, and Mind, Mood and Memory with Massachusetts General Hospital.

Belvoir Media Group is now regarded as one of the largest circulation health information publishers in the world, and manages health newsletters and special health reports for Harvard Health Publishing, and Tufts Media. Harvard's titles include Harvard Health Letter, Harvard Heart Letter, Harvard Women’s Health Watch, and Harvard Men’s Health Watch. Tufts Media publishes Health and Nutrition Letter with the Friedman School of Nutrition Science and Policy at Tufts University.

Belvoir manages the website for Harvard Health Publishing.

In 2016, they launched the health website University Health News

In 2020, Belvoir acquired Bottom Line Health (2022 circulation: 85,000) from Bottom Line Inc., followed in 2021 by the acquisition of Bottom Line Personal (2022 circulation: 225,000). The Bottom Line periodicals interview subject-matter experts in fields ranging from human wellness, to financial strategies, to meaningful lifestyle changes that contribute to readers' personal growth. The 2021 acquisition also included Bottom Line’s book division, and website BottomLineInc.com.

== Pet media ==
Belvoir Media Group manages a number of pet publications and websites. In 1998, as part of the Toronto Star deal, Belvoir began managing Dogwatch and Catwatch newsletters with Cornell University College of Veterinary Medicine. Also in 1998, Belvoir launched Whole Dog Journal, which features articles about aspects of dog care and training.

In conjunction with Tufts Media, Belvoir has published Your Dog and Catnip, monthly newsletters that partner with the Cummings School of Veterinary Medicine at Tufts University, since 2009.

In 2017, Belvoir Media Group acquired the bimonthly publications Catster and Dogster, previously branded as Cat Fancy and Dog Fancy, from Lumina Media. In October 2023, Pangolia acquired Catster and Dogster.

== Titles ==
=== Health and wellness ===
- Bottom Line Health
- Bottom Line Personal
- Cleveland Clinic Arthritis Advisor
- Cleveland Clinic Heart Advisor
- Cleveland Clinic Men's Health Advisor
- Duke Medicine Health News
- Environmental Nutrition
- Harvard Health Letter
- Harvard Heart Letter
- Harvard Women's Health Watch
- Harvard Men's Health Watch
- Harvard Health Publications Licensing
- Harvard Special Health Reports
- Belvoir Health Special Reports
- Massachusetts General Hospital Mind, Mood & Memory
- Mount Sinai School of Medicine Focus on Healthy Aging
- Tufts University Health and Nutrition Letter
- Weill Cornell Medical College Women's Nutrition Connection
- Weill Cornell Medical College Women's Health Advisor
- UCLA Medical Center Healthy Years
- University Health News

=== Aviation ===
- AVWeb
- Aviation Consumer
- Aviation Safety
- IFR Magazine
- IFR Refresher
- Kitplanes

=== Pets ===
- Whole Dog Journal
- Cornell University DogWatch
- Cornell University CatWatch
- Tufts University Catnip
- Tufts University Your Dog
- Dogster
- Catster

=== Other ===
- Practical Sailor
- MaryJanesFarm
