= Julian Sprung =

American zoologist

- Born: 1966 (age 59–60)
- Occupations: Author and Writer
- Writing career
- Subject: Zoology

Julian Sprung (born 1966) is an American writer on marine aquarium fishkeeping. He is an alumnus of the University of Florida where he studied zoology, graduating in 1988.

Sprung has authored articles in aquarium hobby publications such as Freshwater And Marine Aquarium, Seascope, Advanced Aquarist Online, Aquarium Frontiers, Marine and Reef Aquarium USA, Practical Fishkeeping, Tropical Fish Hobbyist, and Coral. Sprung is one of the authors of The Reef Aquarium 3-volume book series (self-published), and is a frequent lecturer at reef aquarium hobby conventions and gatherings.

In 1991 Sprung, with fellow marine aquarium enthusiast Daniel Ramirez, co-founded the company Two Little Fishies, Inc., a manufacturer of marine aquarium supplements, media, and accessories.
