= Motorcycle Consumer News =

Monthly motorcycling magazine

- Editor: David Hilgendorf
- Former editors: Fred Rau, Lee Parks, Dave Searle
- Categories: Motorcycle magazine
- Frequency: Monthly
- Publisher: Lumina Media
- Founder: Roger Hull
- Founded: 1969
- Final issue: January 17, 2020
- Country: USA
- Based in: California
- Language: English
- Website: Official site
- ISSN: 1073-9408

Motorcycle Consumer News (MCN) was a monthly motorcycling magazine that reviewed motorcycles and accessories, and covered motorcycle safety, training and industry news. Unlike most publications, it was wholly subscriber-supported and did not accept advertising.

== History and profile ==
Roger Hull founded the magazine in 1969, with the name Road Rider, and was publisher and editor until 1982. The title was changed to Motorcycle Consumer News (MCN) in 1991, when it became subscriber-supported and ad-free.

While not financially beholden to advertisers, Motorcycle Consumer News was dependent on motorcycle manufacturers to furnish the motorcycles tested, rather than anonymously purchasing test vehicles, as is done by Consumer Reports.

Contributors have included many motorcycle training and safety specialists, including Motorcycle Hall of Fame member David L. Hough, Ken Condon, Tracy Martin, Lee Parks, Walt Fulton, and Gary LaPlante. Numerous physician contributors have included Flash Gordon M.D., Cary Tanner M.D., John Alevizos D.O., Charles L. Rosen M.D., Ph.D., and psychologist Mark Barnes Ph.D. Additional contributors include Motorcycle Mechanics Institute curriculum developer Kevin O'Shaughnessy, global motorcycle adventurer and author Gregory W. Frazier Ph.D., motorcycle designer Glynn Kerr, Moshe K. Levy, and Mike Kneebone, president of the Iron Butt Association.

Motorcycle Consumer News was printed monthly, and had also been available digitally since 2013.

On February 1, 2020, Motorcycle Consumer News publisher Lumina Media LLC announced that it had been dissolved as of that date and had ceased its business operations, due to the company having insufficient assets to satisfy all of its liabilities. The last publication of Motorcycle Consumer News was distributed on January 17, 2020.
