= Dog Fancy =

US magazine

- October 2010 cover of Dog Fancy
- Categories: Pets
- Frequency: Monthly
- Founded: 1970
- Final issue: February 2015
- Company: BowTie Inc.
- Country: USA
- Based in: Irvine, California

Dog Fancy was a monthly magazine dedicated to dogs, owners of dogs, and breeders of dogs. It was founded in 1970 and was described by its publishing company, BowTie Inc., as "the world’s most widely read dog magazine". BowTie Inc. also published its sister magazine Dog World, and Cat Fancy for cats and their owners.

The editorial office was in Irvine, California, and the statement of ownership in the December 2009 issue says the paid circulation was 202,000 copies. In 2014, the circulation was reported as 149,088.

In August 2008, it began publishing a quarterly double issue entitled Natural Dog on the flip side of Dog Fancy. In late 2014, new owners Lumina Media announced that the monthly magazines Cat Fancy and Dog Fancy would be combined with the Dogster and Catster website brands, alternating bimonthly issues of Catster and Dogster beginning in February 2015. Dogster magazine and website were sold to Belvoir Media Group in April 2017.

== See also ==
- Animal fancy
