= Cat Fancy =

Monthly hobbyist magazine (1965–2015)

- December 2007 cover of Cat Fancy
- Categories: Lifestyle
- Frequency: Monthly
- Total circulation (2013): 155,179
- Founded: 1965; 60 years ago
- Final issue: February 2015
- Company: I-5 Publishing
- Country: United States
- Based in: Irvine, California, U.S.
- Language: English
- Website: Archived website
- ISSN: 0892-6514

Cat Fancy was a popular North American monthly magazine dedicated to cats, owners of cats, and breeders of cats. It was originally published by Fancy Publications later named BowTie Inc., sold to Lumina Media in 2013, and shortly thereafter to I-5 Publishing.

In late 2014, I-5 announced that the monthly magazines Cat Fancy and Dog Fancy would be cancelled, and replaced with alternating bimonthly issues of Catster and Dogster (based on websites of the same titles) beginning in February 2015.

== The magazine ==
The first issue was published in 1965. Each issue was dedicated to a certain breed, which was shown on the cover and on a poster inside. The magazine also had health tips, polls, editor's notes, stories written by cat owners, cat product information, cat themed fashions, and a cat picture gallery, among other features.

Cat Fancy's publishers also offered Dog Fancy for dogs and their owners. Cat Fancy magazine's main rival in North America was Cats and Kittens.

In 2007, Cat Fancy was awarded 14 Certificates of Excellence Awards at the 14th Annual Cat Writers' Association Awards Banquet.

Cat Fancy magazine changed its name to Catster magazine and became a bimonthly magazine in 2015. In 2017, it was bought by Belvoir Media Group and continues to publish. Belvoir Media Group is based in Norwalk, Connecticut, and publishes a variety of special interest magazines, newsletters and websites. In addition to Dogster and Catster, Belvoir Media Group's pet publications include Whole Dog Journal, Cornell University DogWatch, Tufts University Your Dog, Cornell University CatWatch, and Tufts University Catnip.

Catster began as a sister site to the Dogster community site.

== Writers and editors ==
Cat Fancy had a number of high-profile pet experts as writers and editors to the magazine. Susan Logan, editor in chief since 2003, also blogs on the company website. Current staff includes Sandy Robbins, a pet lifestyle expert; Helen Jablonski, a cat behavior expert; Elain Wexler-Mitchell, DVM; and Cimeron Morrissey, Animal Planet's Cat Hero of the Year. During the years 1981 to 1983 one of the most popular features was a cartoon series under editor Linda Lewis penned by writer and artist Michael T. Ganci.

== Natural Cat ==
In the summer of 2009, Cat Fancy launched a short-lived spin-off magazine named Natural Cat, about alternative nutrition and medicine, such as organic cat foods and herbal therapy. It premiered in June 2009 in a special double issue of the main magazine. Actress and cat lover Jenna Fischer appeared on the cover and was interviewed about her cats for the feature article. Its slogan was "Caring for Your Whole Cat".

== See also ==
- Animal fancy – Hobby regarding pets or domestic animals
- Cat fancy – Humans who like cats
