= Aquarium Fish International =

- Cover of Aquarium Fish International
- Frequency: Monthly
- Total circulation (2011): 31,170
- First issue: October 1988
- Final issue Number: October 2012; Vol. 24, No. 10
- Company: BowTie
- Country: USA
- Based in: Irvine, California
- Website: www.fishchannel.com
- ISSN: 1942-5678

Aquarium Fish International (AFI) was a North American monthly magazine, published by BowTie Inc. of Irvine, California, and dedicated to freshwater and saltwater fishkeeping and the aquarium/fishkeeping hobby in general.

== History ==
Originally titled Aquarium Fish Magazine (AFM), the first issue of the magazine was in October 1988. The title of the publication changed slightly beginning with the February 2007 issue; the new title was Aquarium Fish International. It had a circulation of 31,170. In June 2010, the former Freshwater and Marine Aquarium magazine ceased publication, and several of its columns were merged into AFI. Aquarium Fish International abruptly ceased publication in October 2012.

== Content and contributors ==
The magazine contained articles and columns on subjects including freshwater/tropical, saltwater/marine and brackish fish, as well as corals and invertebrates, planted tanks and aquascaping, fish breeding, species tanks, new species, fish food and nutrition, water chemistry, tank cycling, filtration, disease and health, fish husbandry and many other subjects such as aquarium equipment, setup, and maintenance.

Monthly columns included Freshwater Q&A, The Aquabotanist, Reef Aquarist, Adventures in Fish Breeding, Secrets to Society Success, Saltwater Q&A, FishKidz, Aquarist Notebook, Aquatic Maestro, Wet Vet, Sand Mail, Popular Freshwater Tropicals, Reef Notes, Freshwater Forum, In the Fish Room and Species Profile.

Animals that have appeared in the magazine include: clownfish, lionfish, cichlids, discus, butterflyfish, tetras, live-bearers, rasboras, triggerfish, starfish, freshwater shrimp, jellyfish, Acropora and brain corals, and more.

Over the years, Scott W. Michael, J. Charles Delbeek, Dick Au, Julian Sprung and many other members of the fishkeeping industry have contributed to Aquarium Fish International.

== FAMA ==
Freshwater and Marine Aquarium (FAMA) magazine was first published in January 1978, and continued publication as a monthly consumer title under R/C Modeler until March 2005, when it was sold to BowTie Inc. Due to publication difficulties, FAMA's production schedule was interrupted until June 2005, when it resumed normal monthly publication under BowTie Inc. FAMA ceased publication with the June 2010 issue, when it was incorporated into AFI.

== See also ==
- Fishkeeping
- List of United States magazines
