= Reptiles (magazine) =

American pet magazine

- Categories: Pet magazine
- Frequency: Bi-monthly
- First issue: October 1993
- Company: Living World Media
- Country: United States
- Based in: Irvine, California
- Language: English
- Website: www.reptilesmagazine.com
- ISSN: 1068-1965

Reptiles magazine is a North American magazine devoted to the reptile and amphibian pet hobby, specializing in the keeping and breeding of these animals. It is based in Irvine, California

== History ==
Fancy Publications, later BowTie Inc., introduced the magazine in October 1993. After a year of publishing bimonthly, Reptiles went monthly in December 1994.

In February 2013, BowTie's magazine titles, including Reptiles, was purchased by I-5 Publishing, LLC.

In December 2013, the Reptiles website was launched.

In 2017, Reptiles magazine was sold again, this time to Living World Media.

== Profile ==
Tips and information on keeping and breeding distinct herps typically make up the bulk of an issue's feature articles, but other topics covered by the magazine include field herping, reptile and amphibian health, conservation, and current trends in the hobby. The magazine occasionally holds contests sponsored by reptile product manufacturers.

Although popular pet animals, such as bearded dragons, corn snakes, red-eared sliders, leopard geckos, crested geckos, Pac Man frogs, ball pythons, red-footed tortoises and many other common species often appear in the magazine, Reptiles also publishes articles about less commonly kept animals, such as Asian box turtles, Aldabra giant tortoises, various types of chameleons, black headed pythons, and occasionally venomous snakes and crocodilians.

Reptiles articles are drafted for a broad range of reptile enthusiasts, from the novice hobbyist to the veteran herpetoculturist. Respected reptile experts and breeders in the industry have written for the magazine.

Usually a reptile or amphibian species is featured on the cover. However, Slash (February 1995) and Mark O'Shea (February 2003) were both cover subjects due to interviews they provided. A two-part interview with Steve Irwin appeared in the October and November 1999 issues.
