= Apartment Therapy =

Interior design electronic media publisher

- Website type: Interior design electronic media publisher
- Owner: Maxwell Ryan
- Website: apartmenttherapy.com
- Launched: 2004

Apartment Therapy is a lifestyle blog and publishing company focused on home design and decor. The website was founded in 2004 and is currently led by Maxwell Ryan. A companion blog, The Kitchn, is dedicated to home cooking, kitchen design, and entertaining.

== History ==
=== Early 2000s ===
Apartment Therapy was founded in 2004 by brothers Maxwell Ryan, an interior designer, and Oliver Ryan, a new media businessperson. Maxwell Ryan, formerly a Waldorf school teacher, started a design consultancy business in 2001. Early on, he created a weekly email list offering further decorating ideas to his clients, particularly to help them make their own design decisions. In 2004, Maxwell Ryan joined Oliver Ryan to turn the email list into a daily blog of design advice. Using ApartmentTherapy.com as the URL, their stated objective was to help readers solve problems without extensive professional guidance.

=== Growth ===
In the mid-2000s, Apartment Therapy established companion sites focused on more specific topics including a children's division called Ohdeedoh and the ecologically friendly blog Re-Nest. Maxwell Ryan and his then-wife, Sara Kate Gillingham-Ryan, a food writer (they have since separated), also started The Kitchn, a page dedicated to recipes and entertaining tips. The diversity of its readership also led Apartment Therapy to launch city-specific blogs for Los Angeles, San Francisco, Chicago, Boston, and Washington, D.C.

As the site became more widely known, Ryan began making regular appearances on the HGTV programs Mission: Organization and Small Space, Big Style. Later, Apartment Therapy was named to best-of lists by periodicals including Time in 2008, Forbes in 2009, and The Daily Telegraph in 2011.

=== Consolidation ===
In early 2012, Apartment Therapy incorporated three of its companion blogs into the main site. Ohdeedoh moved to the "Family channel" on Apartment Therapy.com, Unplggd to the "tech channel," and Re-Nest relocated to the "Green Living" category of the main page. The Kitchn kept its separate URL but was linked from Apartment Therapy's site.

Apartment Therapy won the 2020 Webby Award for Lifestyle in the category Social.

== Site features ==
In addition to sharing design tips, Apartment Therapy features house tours in which readers post pictures of their apartments and solicit suggestions for specific improvements.

In 2005, the site held its first annual "Smallest, Coolest Apartment Contest," open only to New Yorkers with a residence of 500 square feet or less. The year following, Apartment Therapy partnered with furniture manufacturer Design Within Reach to expand the pool of participants nationwide, open to those with a home of no more than 650 square feet. To enter, readers submitted photos to one of five categories ranging from "teeny-tiny" to "small."

According to a 2006 profile in The New York Times, Maxwell Ryan and Sara Kate Gillingham-Ryan used the site to blog about renovations to their apartment, which they expanded from 265 square feet to 700 square feet.

=== The Kitchn ===
Apartment Therapy's companion site, The Kitchn, is dedicated to cooking, entertaining, and life in the kitchen. The blog's founding editor is Sara Kate Gillingham-Ryan. The blog's executive editor is Faith Durand.

== Books ==
Apartment Therapy has published three books of home improvement advice: Apartment Therapy: The Eight-Step Home Cure (Bantam, 2006); Apartment Therapy Presents: Real Homes, Real People, Hundreds of Real Design Solutions (Chronicle, 2008); and Apartment Therapy's Big Book of Small, Cool Spaces (Clarkson Potter, 2010).

In Apartment Therapy: The Eight-Step Home Cure, Ryan compiled his ideas for a healthy residence, describing the home as an extension of oneself.

Apartment Therapy Presents: Real Homes, Real People, Hundreds of Real Design Solutions collects 40 of the apartments featured in the site's house tours. Each section includes an introduction of the resident and overview of the home, including floorplans and an explanation of how the overall effect was accomplished.

Apartment Therapy's Big Book of Small, Cool Spaces presents 40 household examples of how to maximize the use of floor space in small apartments.
