= Lumina Media =

American publisher

- Founded: 1974; 52 years ago (as Fancy Publications)
- Founder: Norman Ridker
- Defunct: February 2020; 6 years ago
- Country of origin: United States
- Headquarters location: Ann Arbor, Michigan, United States
- Publication types: Magazines, books
- Nonfiction topics: Pets, lifestyles, and hobbies
- Official website: luminamedia.com

Lumina Media was an American publisher of magazines, books, and associated websites. Throughout all its incarnations, the business has focused on the pet-keeping and -breeding market, though also with some other topical lifestyle and hobby publications. The original company was founded in 1974 as Fancy Publications (later renamed BowTie Inc.) by Norman Ridker, absorbing Kennel Club Books in 2004, which made BowTie a main competitor to TFH Publications in the pet-book market. In 2002, Bob Garfield of On the Media called Fancy Publications "the Time Warner of the pet magazine business". After some financial difficulties, BowTie was restructured as I-5 Publishing in 2013 under the new ownership of David Fry and Mark Harris, and took on its present name in 2016.

Over the years, the company has launched, acquired, divested, or consolidated many pet-related paper and digital publications, including a number that have been dominant in their niches among North American speciality magazines and sites during various periods, including Bird Talk, Cat Fancy (merged into the Catster website and magazine), Dog Fancy (merged to Dogster), Dog World (purchased from Primedia/Rent Group, and dating to 1916), Ferrets Magazine (merged to the Small Animal Channel website), and Reptiles. Lumina has also dominated the American market for magazine-format newsstand specials about pets (usually annually issued). In 2016, Lumina sold its book division – responsible for more than 400 paper books and e-books, mostly about specific breeds – to Fox Chapel Publishing, forming the new imprint CompanionHouse Press. Some other noteworthy Lumina publications have included Motorcycle Consumer News, Veterinary Practice News (later published by Kenilworth Media), and the first magazine devoted to animal rescue, Rescue Me (later Rescue Proud). As of February 2020, Lumina Media was dissolved and had ceased their business operations. A letter was sent to subscribers without explanation as to why.

== History ==
Fancy Publications was started by Norman Ridker in 1974. Ridker subsequently renamed the company to BowTie Inc. (publishing books as BowTie Press) to show his love of bow ties. By 2013, BowTie had experienced months of financial difficulties caused in part by significant decreases in readership and in advertisement proceeds. In 2013, I-5 Publishing LLC, a new company founded by David Fry and Mark Harris, bought BowTie's businesses for an eight-figure sum. I-5 started to decrease their "breeder-centric" publications in favor of rescue-focused content, and launched a topically unique magazine titled Rescue Me, later followed up by Rescue Proud. The company was renamed to Lumina Media in 2016.

=== Timeline ===
- 1993 – Fancy Publications published the magazines Aquarium Fish, Bird Talk, Cat Fancy, Dog Fancy, Horse Illustrated, Pet Product News, Reptiles, and Wild Bird.
- 1998 – Fancy Publications operated the website Animal Network and published Bird Breeder magazine.
- 1998 – Fancy Publications sued Primedia (now Rent Group) over alleged copyright infringement by Primedia's Cats magazine.
- 1999 – Fancy Publications published Bird Talk, Critters, Dog Fancy, Ferrets, Koi World, Natural Cat, Natural Dog, Rabbits, and Reptiles.
- 2004 – BowTie acquired Kennel Club Books, a publisher in Allenhurst, New Jersey, that specialized in dog-breed books, adding about 200 titles to their then-current collection of around 100 titles. The Library of Congress has 265 books published under the Kennel Club Books imprint.
- 2012 – BowTie stopped publishing a print version of Bird Talk magazine.
- 2012 – Thoroughbred Times magazine filed for bankruptcy and terminated operations. The Times had been started in 1985 and was acquired by BowTie in 1993.
- 2013 – I-5 Publishing signed a 10-year deal to print and distribute Rat Rod Magazine, adding to its several auto titles, including Auto Restorer magazine.
- 2013 – Lumina Media purchased Dog Fancy and Cat Fancy magazines from BowTie.
- 2013 – I-5 Publishing acquired the Dogster and Catster websites from Say Media.
- 2013 – I-5 Publishing acquires Poultry World (previously The Poultry Magazine)
- 2014 – Lumina Media launched alternating bimonthly print magazines for Dogster and Catster and stopped publishing Dog Fancy and Cat Fancy magazines.
- 2016 – Lumina Media sold its book division to Fox Chapel Publishing, including 330 print books and 440 e-books to be sold under the new imprint CompanionHouse Press.
- 2017 – Lumina Media sold Veterinary Practice News to Kenilworth Media, Inc.
- 2017 – Lumina Media sold the Web publication Petcha and Reptiles magazine to PetSmart.
- 2017 – Lumina Media sold Horse Illustrated, Young Rider, Hobby Farms, and Chickens magazines to EG Media Investments.
- 2017 – Lumina Media sold Dogster and Catster to Belvoir Media Group.

== Magazines ==
Magazines published by I-5 Publishing (monthly, unless otherwise noted) include or formerly included:

- Aquarium USA (annual)
- Auto Restorer
- Bird Talk
- Cats USA (annual)
- Chickens
- Cigar & Spirits (50% stake, sold back to the magazine's original founder in 2015)
- Critters USA (annual)
- Dog World (annual)
- Dogs USA (annual)
- Dogs in Review
- Ferrets Magazine (bimonthly, later online-only)
- Hobby Farms
- Horse Illustrated
- Horses USA (annual)
- Kittens USA (annual)
- Lucky Puppy
- Marine Fish and Reef USA (annual)
- Motorcycle Consumer News
- Popular Horse (series of specials)
- Puppies USA (annual)
- Puppies 101
- Quarter Horses
- Rabbits USA (annual)
- Rat Rod (pertaining to hotrods, not rodents)
- Reptiles
- Reptiles USA (annual)
- Rescue Proud
- Road Rider
- Urban Farm (bimonthly)
- Young Rider (pertaining to horses, not motorcycles)
- Your New Horse

== Websites ==
I-5 Publishing has operated several websites (with domain names corresponding to their titles, e.g. SmallAnimalChannel.com for Small Animal Channel) including:

- Bird Channel
- Cat Channel
- Dog Channel
- Fish Channel
- Horse Channel
- Reptile Channel
- Small Animal Channel (devoted primarily to rabbits and rodents)
