= Mountain Rose Herbs =

American herb company

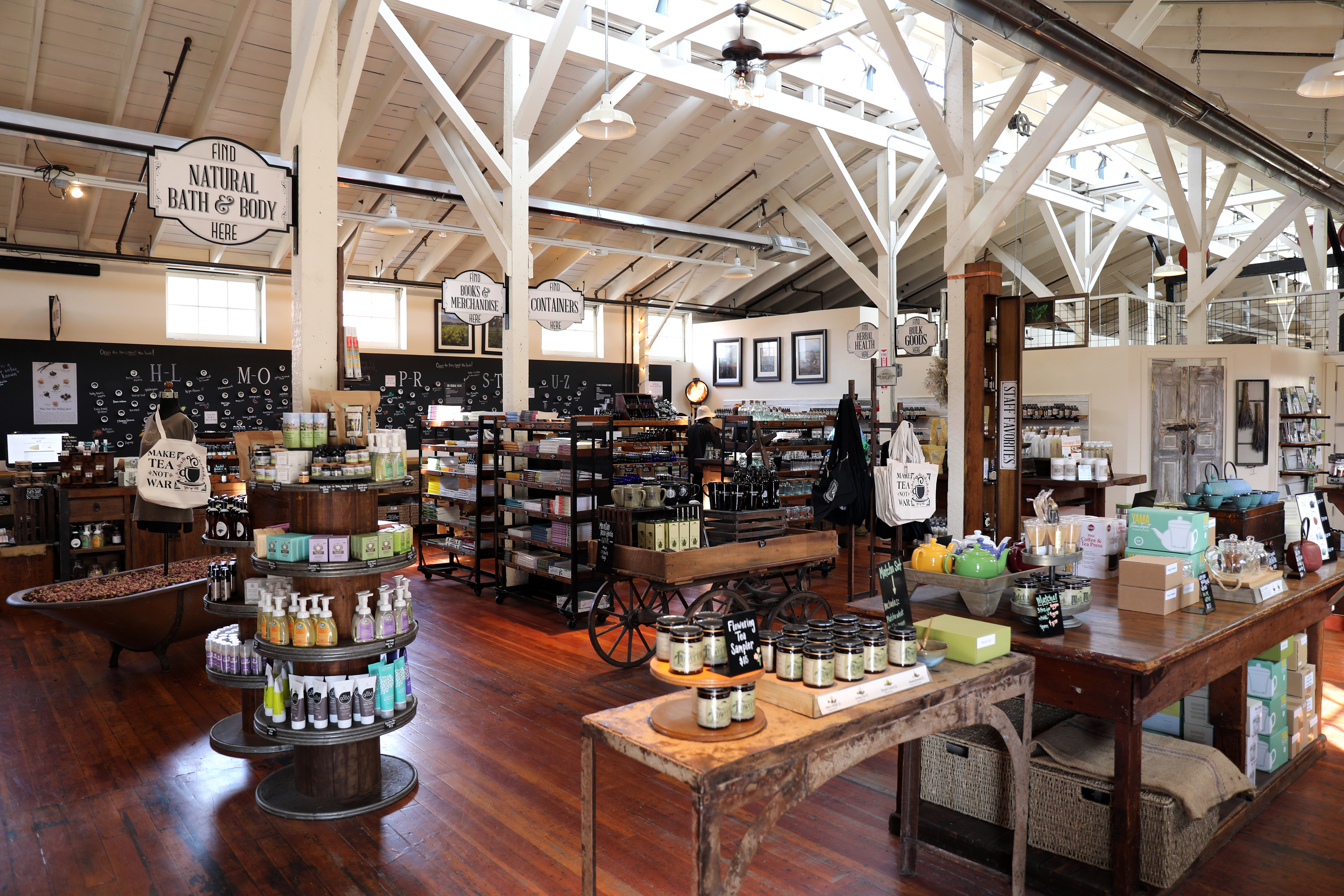
- Type: Private
- Industry: Alternative & Holistic Health
- Founded: 1987
- Headquarters: Eugene, Oregon, United States
- Key people: Owner:Shawn Donnille; CEO:Cameron Stearns
- Products: Organic herbs, spices, teas, essential oils, carrier oils
- Number of employees: 200 (2018)
- Website: www.mountainroseherbs.com

Mountain Rose Herbs is an American grower, processor, distributor, and retailer of herbs, spices, teas, essential oils, and DIY ingredients used in herbalism. Founded in 1987, the company is based in Eugene, Oregon. Mountain Rose Herbs is known for organic, sustainably sourced, and wild harvested products. By 2010, it was the second-largest distributor of organic dried herbs in the nation. The e-commerce company opened its first retail location, Mountain Rose Herbs Mercantile, in 2016 in downtown Eugene, selling organic botanicals and DIY supplies.

== History ==
Herbalist, educator, and author Rosemary Gladstar established what would become Mountain Rose Herbs in 1987 in Northern California, as a mail-order company that provided supplies for students of the California School of Herbal Studies. In 1991, herbalist Julie Bailey purchased the business. She continued to run Mountain Rose Herbs from her Humboldt County, California home, filling orders by mail. The company grew steadily through the 1990s and adopted rigorous guidelines for the harvesting of wild plants. In 1997, Mountain Rose Herbs moved to larger premises in North San Juan, California. In 2000, environmental activist Shawn Donnille was promoted to management. They obtained organic certification for the company, and built the first Mountain Rose Herbs website to sell products online.

In 2001, Shawn Donnille became a part owner and the business moved to Pleasant Hill, Oregon to be closer to the company's farm operations, wild harvesters, and processors. This move enabled the creation of a full-time laboratory and quality control department. The home-based retailer became a certified organic processor through Oregon Tilth in 2002.

Between 2001 and 2010, Mountain Rose Herbs experienced steady growth, and in July 2010, the retailer moved to their current facility in West Eugene. This 60,600-square-foot factory and a separate 10,000-square-foot building next door tripled the retailer's space. By 2010, it was the second-largest distributor of organic dried herbs in the nation.

Mountain Rose Herbs has been recognized multiple times for ethical business practices. In 2010, the company was a finalist for the Oregon Ethics in Business Award. In 2011, they were awarded the Oregon Organic Coalition of Excellence award. The Oregon Sustainability Board selected Mountain Rose Herbs as the 2012 Grand Champion for the Governor's Sustainability Award, recognizing the company as a leader in socially and environmentally responsible business practices. In 2013, Shawn Donnille was a recipient of a 20 under 40 Award, for helping to "foster growth from an ‘out of the garage’ operation into one of Eugene's largest and most dynamic employers."

In 2015, Mountain Rose Herbs was working with fifteen certified organic farms throughout the Pacific Northwest.

The e-commerce company opened its first retail location, Mountain Rose Herbs Mercantile, in 2016 in downtown Eugene, selling organic botanicals and DIY supplies.

In January 2017, Mountain Rose Herbs purchased the assets of Eugene herbal products company, Terra Firma Botanicals. Shawn Donnille became an equal partner with Julie Bailey; via marriage, in the business. Mountain Rose Herbs now employs over 200 people in six separate Eugene facilities.

Mountain Rose Herbs expanded their facilities again in 2018 with the opening of a new milling facility in West Eugene.

In 2020, Mountain Rose Herbs was impacted by the COVID-19 pandemic. Shawn Donnille became the CEO and restructured the business and leadership team. On September 30, 2020, after 30 years of leadership, Julie Bailey retired, passing full ownership to Shawn Donnille.

In December 2020, Mountain Rose Herbs purchased the Phoenix Industrial Park in Eugene. This purchase was to consolidate six facilities into one 12-acre campus to reduce the business's carbon footprint. “We are continually striving for a carbon-neutral business model,” said Shawn Donnille in an interview with KLCC Radio.

In 2024 they opened their second location in Seattle, Washington.

== Products ==
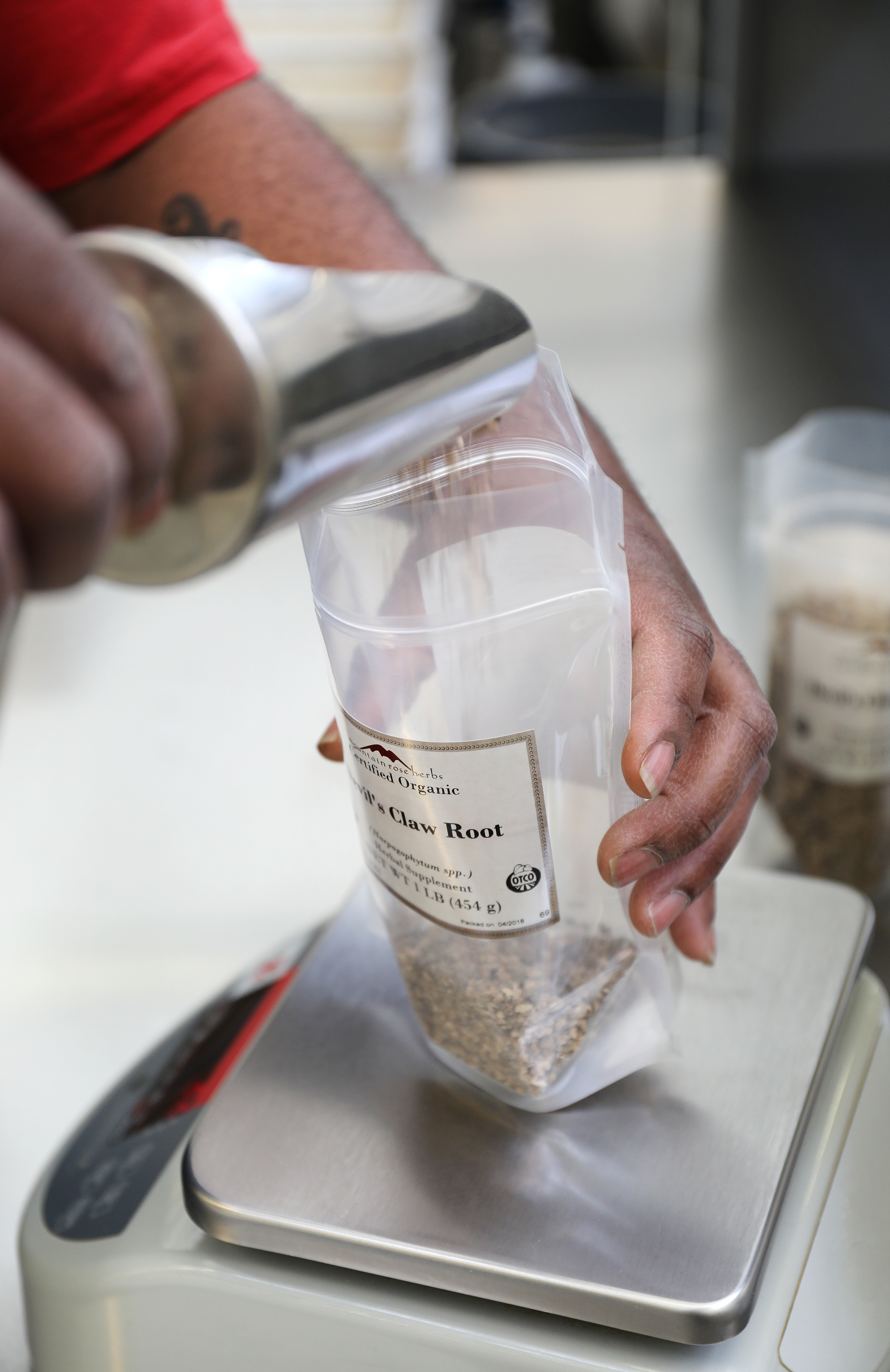
Mountain Rose Herbs order being filled

Mountain Rose Herbs carries approximately 1,500 botanical items, with 6,000 finished products. These include bulk herbs, spices, culinary salts, sprouting seeds, teas, aromatherapy products, extracts, tinctures, salves, balms, natural bath and skincare products, books, and tools. In 2023, owner Shawn Donnille published his first book, The Mountain Rose Herbs Book of Natural Body Care.

== Herbal Education ==
As part of their ongoing support for herbal education, the company established Free Herbalism Project events, an annual community event with botanically inspired lectures from experts in the field. Additionally, the company provides educational podcasts called Herbal Radio and how-to videos on YouTube.

In 2011, Mountain Rose Herbs founded Rootstalk Festival, a three-day benefit festival that brought together 40 experts and environmental groups to present classes on sustainable living, herbal medicine, wilderness skills, urban farming, and homesteading projects.

In 2015, Mountain Rose Herbs and Oregon Tilth presented a free Organic Land Care Peer Learning Session for landscape professionals.

== Community ==
In 2009, Mountain Rose Herbs established the Mountain Rose River Project, a grassroots action team. Each year, employees carry out six to eight restoration projects through a Paid Time for Community Involvement program. The company partners with the state of Oregon, federal government, and nonprofit agencies to work on projects primarily focusing on local riparian ecosystems, stream health, and fish habitat.

Since 2012, Mountain Rose Herbs has maintained a comprehensive fair trade certification in accordance with the IMO Fair for Life standard. The company has worked directly with organic herb and spice growers through its Fair for Life Project. This project helps small organic farms in India comply with fair trade requirements by acting as mandator of the project, funding the certification process, and paying fair trade premiums for the goods.

In 2017, Mountain Rose Herbs was awarded the Innovation in Philanthropy Award from the Portland Business Journal in recognition for the Mountain Rose River Project, and for its charitable giving and nonprofit partnerships.

== Sustainability ==
Mountain Rose Herbs advocates for organic farming, the environment, and fair trade. Most products are certified organic, all packaging is environmentally friendly, bottles and labels are made from post-consumer plastics and paper, tea boxes are compostable, and printing is done with soy-based inks. Additionally, the company conserves water with a satellite-controlled irrigation system, and a bioswale filters runoff water from the roof and pavement.

Mountain Rose Herbs was the first Oregon company to receive Zero Waste Facility Certification. Companies that are awarded the Zero Waste Facility Certification must meet all local, state, and federal waste regulations, and also divert at least 90% of all non-hazardous waste from landfills and incineration. Mountain Rose Herbs holds the highest level of certification: Platinum.

In 2014, the retailer became the first company in Eugene to be salmon-safe certified.

In 2015, Mountain Rose Herbs installed over 100 photovoltaic solar panels to generate electricity for the main facility in Eugene. The 25 kWh solar array installed on the roof was expected to produce about 32,604 kWh of energy in the first year. Over the expected 35-year lifespan of the system, it is anticipated to offset 470 tons of CO_{2}, which is equivalent to the conservation of 10,980 trees or 48,170 US gallons (182,300 L) of gasoline.

Additionally, Mountain Rose Herbs is a Bicycle Friendly Business, and offers an Alternative Commute Program that pays cash incentives to employees who carpool with fellow staff members, use public transportation, bicycle, or walk to work.

The company has received numerous awards for its sustainability leadership, including The 100 Best Green Companies to Work for in Oregon, the Beyond Toxics Visionary Leader Award, and the Charities@Work Corporate Excellence Award for overall excellence in employee engagement and corporate social responsibility.
