= ZuPreem =

Animal feeds manufacturing company

- Founded: 1993
- Owner: The Carlyle Group
- Website: zupreem.com

ZuPreem, a brand of Compana, manufactures and sells animal feeds, particularly for zoo animals and exotic pets. It is based in Shawnee, Kansas.

== History ==
ZuPreem was founded in 1993 by David R. Morris.

In April 2021 the company was sold to St. Louis-based Manna Pro, which is managed by the investment firm The Carlyle Group.
