= Flash Gordon (physician) =

American physician

- Born: New York, NY
- Occupations: M.D., activist, humorist and author
- Partner: none
- Children: none

Flash Gordon is a practicing primary care physician in Greenbrae, California, who has been described as the premier physician and medical spokesperson for the motorcyclist community in the US. He has written two books on motorcycling medicine: Blood, Sweat & Gears (1995) and Blood, Sweat & 2nd Gear (2008), and was a contributing columnist for Motorcycle Consumer News magazine, as well as San Francisco's monthly CityBike.

== Education ==
Gordon was awarded a physics honors scholarship at the University of Miami before going on to study medicine.

== Career ==
Flash Gordon was director of the medical section of Haight Ashbury Free Clinics in the late 1980s. He directed the emergency medicine residency at San Francisco General Hospital from 1978 until 1980. He currently is a primary care physician seeing patients in Greenbrae, California.

== H.E.A.R. ==
Gordon is a founder of H.E.A.R., a group devoted to protecting musicians' hearing.

== Interests ==
As a member of the national board of directors of Doctors Ought to Care (DOC), which is a nationwide organization of physicians and medical students who work with young people to promote healthy lifestyles. Through DOC Gordon used humour to promote a ban on tobacco advertising.

Gordon has commuted on motorcycles since 1961 and rides from San Francisco to Greenbrae, California almost daily. A regular medical columnist in San Francisco's CityBike magazine, Gordon published a collection of his articles as Blood, Sweat, and Gears: Ramblings on Motorcycling and Medicine, a first aid book for motorcyclists, in 1995. His second book, Blood, Sweat & 2nd Gear: More Medicine for Motorcyclists is a collection of his columns from Motorcycle Consumer News and was published in 2008.

== Published work ==
- Blood, Sweat & Gears: Ramblings on Motorcycling and Medicine (1995). ISBN 1-884313-03-5.
- Blood, Sweat & 2nd Gear: More Medicine for Motorcyclists January 1, 2008. ISBN 1-884313-63-9.
