= Kicked Out (book) =

2010 anthology compiled and edited by Sassafras Lowrey

Kicked out
- Language: English
- Subject: Homelessness, LGBT youth
- Publisher: Homofactus Press
- Publication date: 2010
- Publication place: United States
- Media type: Print
- Pages: 222 pp
- Awards: Lambda Literary Award finalist, Over the Rainbow book (American Library Association)
- ISBN: 9780978597368
- OCLC: 557899298

Kicked Out is a 2010 anthology compiled and edited by Sassafras Lowrey. The book includes personal narratives from homeless and formerly homeless LGBT youth, as well as policy essays from service providers. The book is intended to serve both as a "guidebook" and to draw attention to youth homelessness to the broader LGBT community.

The book calls for not only "more and better resources for at-risk LGBTQ youth, but also a transformation of the structures that maintain the epidemics of homelessness, suicidality, mental illness and addiction in this marginalized population."

The book's editor, Sassafras Lowrey, lived through homelessness, and shares her story as part of the anthology.

== Reception ==
The Lambda Literary Foundation gave the book a positive review, noting that while it acknowledged challenges facing LGBTQ youth, "the work emphasizes coping and resiliency." Kicked out was a finalist for the Lambda Literary Award and was included on the American Library Association's Rainbow book list and Over the Rainbow book list.
