= Kicked Out (film) =

1918 American film

- Directed by: Alfred J. Goulding
- Produced by: Hal Roach
- Starring: Harold Lloyd
- Distributed by: Pathé Exchange
- Release date: May 5, 1918
- Running time: 10 minutes
- Country: United States
- Languages: Silent; English intertitles

Kicked Out is a 1918 American silent comedy short film featuring Harold Lloyd. A print of Kicked Out exists.

== Cast ==
- Harold Lloyd
- Snub Pollard
- Bebe Daniels
- William Blaisdell
- Sammy Brooks
- Lige Conley (as Lige Cromley)
- Billy Fay (as B. Fay)
- William Gillespie
- Helen Gilmore
- Marvin Loback
- Belle Mitchell
- James Parrott
- Dorothea Wolbert
