= Cat lady =

Cultural archetype of a woman who owns many cats

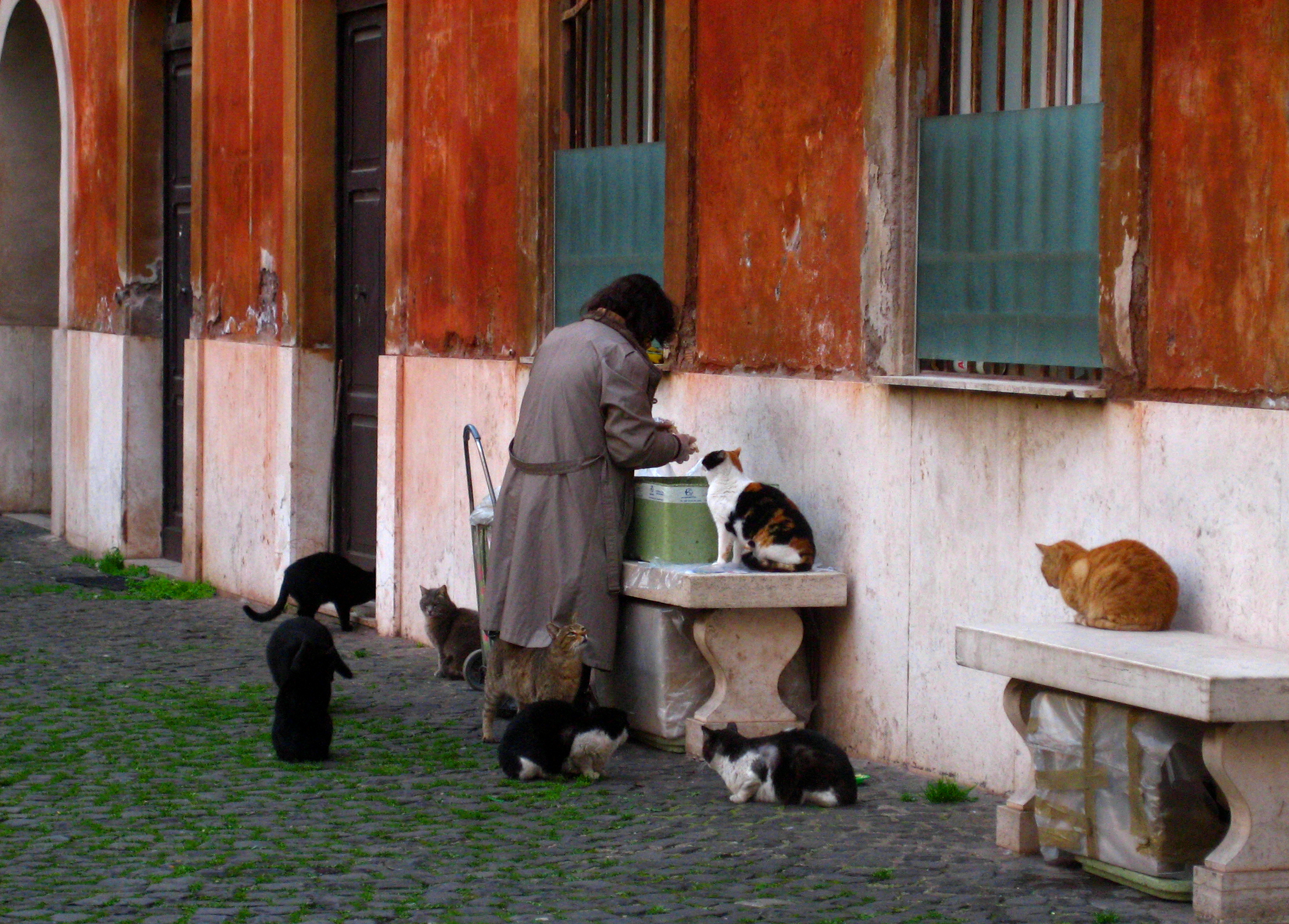
A woman feeding cats in Rome

A cat lady is a cultural archetype or stock character, most often depicted as a middle-aged or elderly spinster or widow, who has many cats. The term may be pejorative, or it may be affectionately embraced.

== Usage and association ==
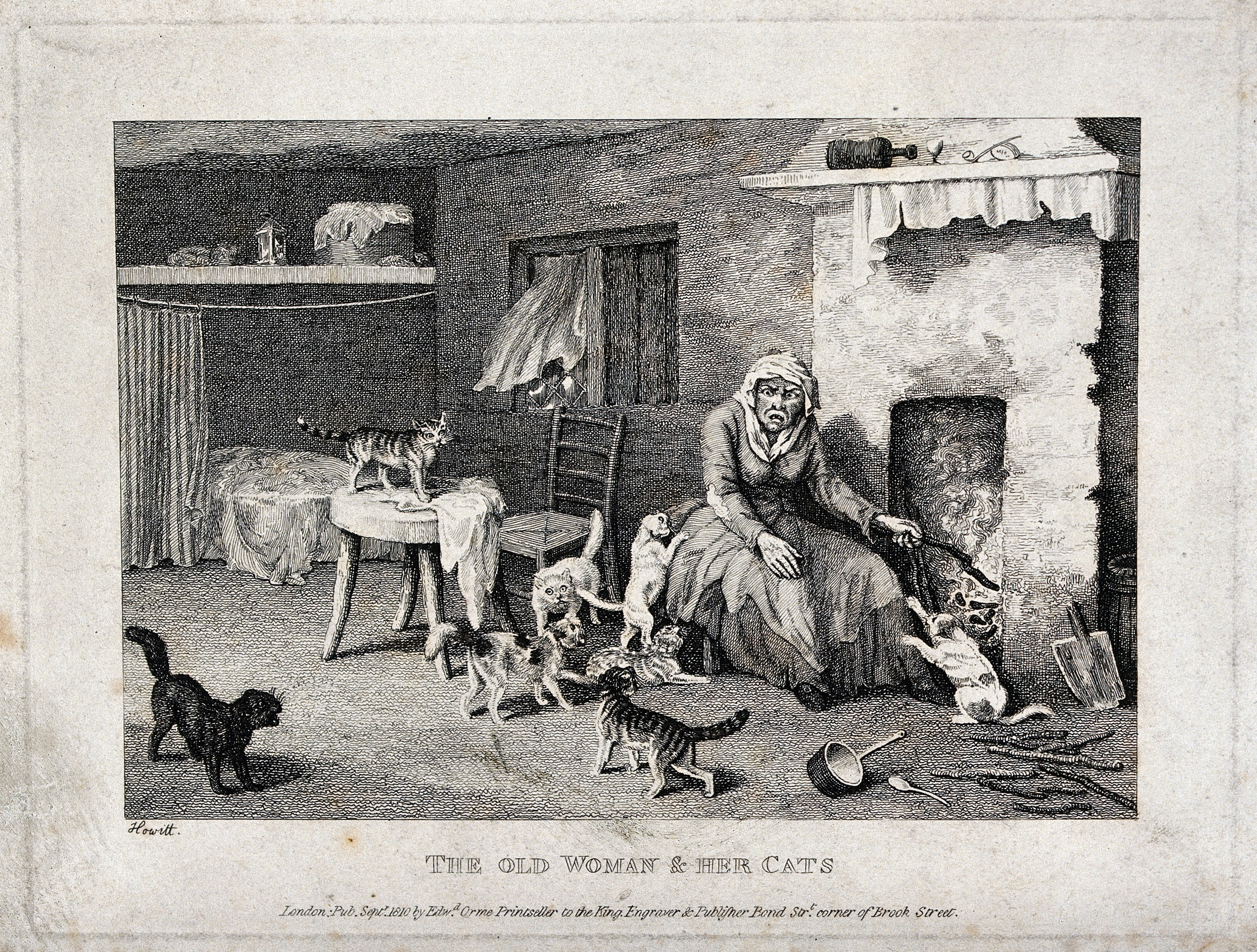
The old woman and her cats, 1811 by Samuel Howitt

Women who have cats have long been associated with the concept of spinsterhood, widowhood or even witchcraft. In more recent decades, the concept of a cat lady has been associated with "romance-challenged (often career-oriented) women". The term "cat lady" has also been used as a pejorative term towards women without children, regardless of if they actually own cats.

Depending on context, the ordinarily pejorative word "crazy" may be prepended to "cat lady" to indicate either a pejorative or a humorous and affectionate label. Some writers, celebrities, and artists have challenged the gender-based "Crazy Cat Lady" stereotype, and embraced the term to mean an animal lover or rescuer who cares for one or multiple cats, and who is psychologically healthy. Naftali Berrill, Ph.D., Director of the New York Center for Neuropsychology and Forensic Behavioral Science, told AOL Health, "These may be people who have a very hard time expressing themselves to other people. They may find the human need for affection is met most easily through a relationship with a pet." This devotion can sometimes signal mental or emotional issues such as depression. A cat lady may also be an animal hoarder who keeps large numbers of cats without having the ability to properly house or care for them.

== Toxoplasma gondii ==
Some studies indicate a link between the parasite Toxoplasma gondii, which sexually reproduces exclusively in cats, and numerous psychiatric conditions, including obsessive compulsive disorder (OCD) and schizophrenia, whereas other studies have shown that T. gondii is not a causative factor in later psychoses. The compulsive hoarding of cats, a symptom of obsessive compulsive disorder (OCD), has been associated with "crazy cat ladies". Crazy cat-lady syndrome is a term coined by news organizations to describe scientific findings that link Toxoplasma gondii to several mental disorders and behavioral problems.

== Notable examples ==
- Edith Ewing Bouvier and her daughter Edith Bouvier Beale had many cats living with them in their decrepit home Grey Gardens. Reportedly, some 30 cats lived in the house by the time Little Edie sold it in 1979.
- Bertha Rand was Winnipeg's notorious Cat Lady, who for years battled her neighbours and city hall to save her dozens of cats; even years after her death, she still holds a place in Canadian popular culture. The Venetian Snares song For Bertha Rand, from the 2001 album Songs About My Cats, pays homage to her, and Maureen Hunter's play The Queen of Queen Street is based on Rand's life.
- In a 2021 interview on Fox & Friends, then-senator, future 2024 Republican vice presidential candidate, and future vice president JD Vance called the leadership of the country "a bunch of childless cat ladies who are miserable at their own lives", and explicitly mentioned Kamala Harris, Pete Buttigieg and Alexandria Ocasio-Cortez. He later received some negative reaction for the comment.
- Celebrity Taylor Swift has referred to herself as a cat lady on multiple occasions. In an Instagram post endorsing Democratic presidential candidate Kamala Harris in the 2024 United States presidential election, Swift signed the post off referring to herself as "Childless Cat Lady" in reference to Vance's comment.

== See also ==
- Cat people and dog people
- Pet humanization
- Think Think and Ah Tsai
