= Ferrets Magazine =

American ferret magazine

Ferrets Magazine was published by BowTie Inc. (later named I-5 Publishing LLC) from 1997 until 2008, targeted at ferret owners. The magazine was based in Mission Viejo, California. In April 2008, the magazine converted to an online-only format and merged with other material into the website Small Animal Channel, which also included coverage of rabbits and rodents.
