= Dog World =

US magazine

- Frequency: Monthly
- First issue: January 1916
- Final issue: September 2012
- Company: BowTie Inc.
- Country: USA
- Based in: Chicago

Dog World was a monthly magazine aimed at the community of serious dog enthusiasts and participants, including breeders; conformation exhibitors; obedience, agility, herding, and field trial competitors; veterinarians; groomers; and trainers. The magazine is owned by BowTie, Inc. The first issue was published in January 1916, and the final issue was published in September 2012.

== Early history ==
The first issue of Dog World magazine was published in January 1916 by the Dog World Publishing Co. of Oak Park, Ill. It was one of the first dog magazines. The magazine was sold for 10 cents per copy or one dollar per year. The magazine's tagline was "A Monthly Journal Devoted to the Interests of the Dog, Dog Breeders and Dog Fanciers."

The Judy-Berner Publishing Co. of Chicago, Ill. published Dog World magazine from January 1923 to Spring 1981 when it was sold to the Maclean-Hunter Publishing Corp. of Chicago, Ill. Maclean Hunter published Dog World until the mid-1990s, when the magazine was sold to Primedia (now Rent Group). Fancy Publications, of Irvine, California (and now named Lumina Media) purchased Dog World in late 2001 and took over publication of the magazine starting with the March 2002 issue.

From 1923 to 1948, the magazine's tagline was "A Monthly Journal for Breeders, Fanciers and Dog Lovers". In October 1948, the tagline changed to "All Breeds---All Dog News," and in May 1976, Dog World's tagline was "The World's Largest All Breed Dog Magazine." From the late-1990s until 2003, the magazine's tagline was "The Authority on Dog Care." In 2003, the tagline was changed to "Active Dogs, Active People."

== BowTie Inc. ==
BowTie, Inc. publishes many other animal-focused magazines, such as Dog Fancy, Cat Fancy, Bird Talk, Horse Illustrated, Aquarium Fish International, and Dogs In Review, as well as several websites devoted to pets, including DogChannel.com. BowTie declared bankruptcy and all of the magazines went out of business.
