= Catster =

North American monthly magazine for cats

- Categories: Lifestyle
- Frequency: Every Two Months
- Founded: 2015; 11 years ago
- Final issue: December 2023
- Company: Belvoir Media Group
- Country: United States
- Language: English
- Website: catster.com
- ISSN: 2376-8258

Catster was a North American monthly magazine dedicated to cats, owners of cats, and breeders of cats and also a website that publishes content for cat lovers. Its sister publication was Dogster, a website for dog lovers.

In October 2023, Pangolia acquired the historic Catster and Dogster brands from Belvoir Media Group.

== History ==
Catster began as a cat-centric community website by the creators of Dogster in the early 2000s. The sites were created by Ted Rheingold and Steven Reading.

As the online community grew, the Catster website published a wide variety of award-winning cat-related content, from informative articles about cat care to heartwarming personal stories and anecdotes about life with cats.

Catster and Dogster partnered with the PAWS Foundation to sponsor America's Favorite Pet photo contest, an annual online voting competition and cause-based marketing campaign benefiting the non-profit organization. The grand prize was a feature in Catster or Dogster magazine and $5,000 cash.

In 2015, Catster via Lumina Media acquired Cat Fancy magazine and rebranded the publication as Catster magazine. At the time of the transaction, Cat Fancy print circulation stood at 155,000 copies per year.

== Cat Fancy ==
The first issue of Cat Fancy was published in 1965 by Leslie Slawson-Smith. It was eventually published by BowTie Inc. (restructured as I-5 Publishing). Each issue was dedicated to a certain cat breed, which was shown on the cover and on a poster inside. The magazine also had health tips, polls, editor's notes, stories written by cat owners, cat product information, cat-themed fashion, and a cat picture gallery, among other features.

Cat Fancy magazine's main rival in North America was Cats and Kittens.

In 2007, Cat Fancy was awarded 14 Certificates of Excellence Awards at the 14th Annual Cat Writers' Association Awards Banquet.

The magazine was acquired by SAY Media (now part of The Arena Group) in 2011. The final issue of Cat Fancy magazine was published in February 2015 as Lumina Media acquired Cat Fancy and Dog Fancy (now Dogster). Cat Fancy magazine changed its name to Catster magazine, and became a bimonthly magazine in 2015.

== Catster ==
Catster issued its first print edition in May/June 2015. In 2017, the Catster brand was bought by Belvoir Media Group, who continued to publish the print magazine and run the website. Belvoir Media Group will issue its final print edition with the November/December 2023 issue, following the sale of the Catster and Dogster brands to Pangolia in October 2023.

== Awards ==
Catster publications have won numerous awards, both online and print. Notable winners include:

- 2023: Certificate of Excellence, Periodical/National Circulation Publication—Annie Butler Shirreffs, September/October 2022 issue
- 2022: Special Award, Kari Winters Rescue & Rehabilitation Award—Dusty Rainbolt, “Save a Life: Foster a Kitten”
- 2020: MUSE Medallion, Written Article: Wild Felines (under 800 words)—Deborah Barnes, ”Cool Cats: From Motherless Kittens to Ambassadors”
- 2019: MUSE Medallion, Periodical/National Circulation Publication—Annie Butler Shireffs
- 2018: Special Award, Lorie Huston Health Award—Helen Fitzsimons, ”Tanya’s Comprehensive Guide to Feline Chronic Kidney Disease”
- 2017: MUSE Medallion, Color Photograph: Single—Andrew Martilla, Catster Cover Photo
- 2017: Special Award, Lorie Huston Health Award—Lisa Richman, ”Is Fish in Cat Food Bad for Cats?”
