= Dogster =

Magazine and website for dog lovers

- Categories: Dogs
- Frequency: Bimonthly
- Publisher: Belvoir Media Group LLC
- First issue: 1970
- Based in: Norwalk, Connecticut
- Language: English
- Website: dogster.com
- ISSN: 2376-8266

Dogster is a bimonthly magazine and website for dog lovers. Its sister publication is Catster, a bimonthly magazine and website for cat lovers. Dogster magazine (formerly Dog Fancy) has been continuously published since 1970, celebrating 50 years in 2020.

Dogster began as a community site and in 2005 won a Webby Award in the category for best community site.

It was acquired by SAY Media in 2011. In July 2014, Dogster and Catster were sold to Lumina Media. In 2015, Lumina Media combined its two large cat and dog brands — Dog Fancy magazine and Dogster.com and Cat Fancy magazine and Catster.com — under the brand names of Catster and Dogster. The Dogster and Catster brands were sold to Belvoir Media Group in April 2017.

In late 2023, Dogster was acquired by Pangolia.
