= Modern Dog (magazine) =

Quarterly dog-centric magazine

- Editor: Connie Wilson
- Categories: Hobby magazine
- Frequency: Semi-Annually
- Publisher: Connie Wilson
- Founder: Connie Wilson
- Founded: 2002
- Country: Canada
- Based in: Vancouver, British Columbia
- Language: English
- Website: moderndogmagazine.com
- ISSN: 1703-812X

Modern Dog is a dog-centric magazine published semi-annually. Started in 2002 by current publisher and editor-in-chief Connie Wilson, the magazine has grown to be one of the largest dog-related publications in North America.

Regular features in the magazine include Body & Soul, featuring health and wellness-focused articles such as "10 People Foods for Dogs", breed profiles, photo contests, behaviour and training, dog-friendly travel guides, new products, and expert advice and information.

An interview and photo spread with a celebrity (and their dogs) is featured in every issue. Past celebrities have included Ellen DeGeneres (with Wolf and Mabel), supermodel Niki Taylor, and Paula Abdul (with Chomps, Thumbelina, Tulip and Bessie Moo).
