= Animal fancy =

Hobby regarding pets or domestic animals

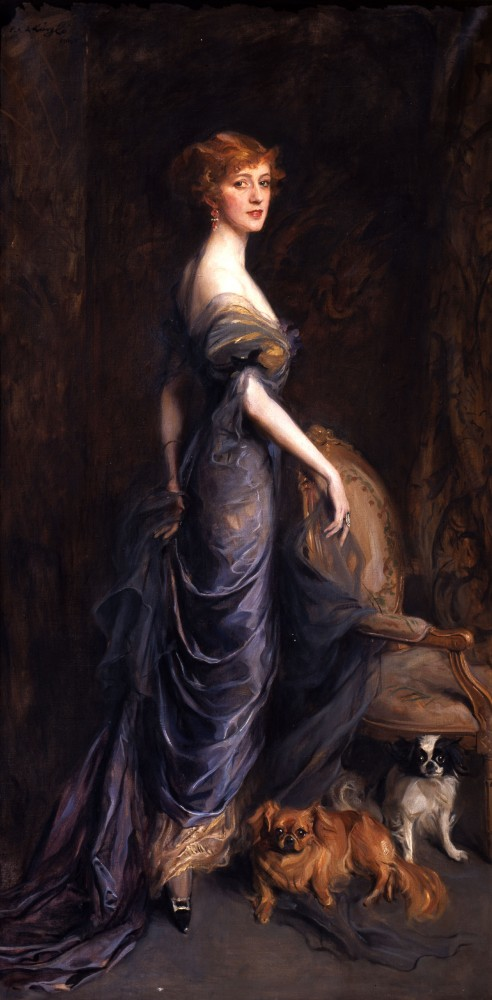
Mrs. George Owen Sandys and her pets, painted by Philip de László, 1915

Animal fancy is a hobby involving the appreciation, promotion, or breeding of pet or domestic animals.

Fancy may include ownership, showing, animal sports and other competitions, and breeding. Hobbyists may simply collect specimens of the animal in appropriate enclosures (vivaria), such as an aquarium, terrarium, or aviary. Some fanciers keep hobby farms, or menageries (private zoos). There are many animal fancy clubs and associations in the world, which cater to everything from pigeons to Irish Wolfhounds. Fanciers and fancierdom may collectively be referred to as the fancy for that kind of animal, e.g. the cat fancy.

Animal fancy includes the keeping of animals considered exotic pets; a rapidly growing example is herpetoculture, the keeping of reptiles and amphibians.

== Organizations ==
Some examples of international animal fancy organizations are:

- Avicultural Society, an organization for the keeping and breeding of all types of birds other than domesticated varieties, with various national chapters; founded in 1894.
- Fédération Cynologique Internationale (FCI), an international federation of many national kennel clubs (dog fancier and breeder organizations), founded in 1911. Not all prominent national clubs are affiliated, including the American Kennel Club.
- Fédération Internationale Féline (FIFe), an international federation of many national cat fancier and breeder organizations, founded in 1949. Many notable national clubs are not affiliated; the US-based Cat Fanciers' Association (CFA) is not, while the UK has a FIFe affiliate it also has the competing Governing Council of the Cat Fancy (GCCF).
- International Butterfly Breeders Association (IBBA), an organization for commercial butterfly "farmers", as well as hobbyists, founded in 1998.
- International Herpetological Society (IHS), an organization for both research regarding and propagation of reptiles and amphibians, founded in 1969.

For many species of domesticated animal there are no international groups, but numerous unrelated national organizations, e.g. the American Poultry Association, and the New Zealand Cavy Club. They may commingle the interests of keepers of pet and show animals, and breeders of livestock and working animals (e.g. the British Horse Society), or focus on one or the other (e.g. the British Show Horse Association). For some species, there are few multi-breed organizations, but many breed-specific clubs, e.g. the Australian Stock Horse Society, the Parthenais Cattle Breeders Association, the Bernese Mountain Dog Club of New Zealand, etc. Single-breed clubs often exist regardless of the establishment of multi-breed groups, and may or may not affiliate with them, while national organizations often have subnational affiliates. Organizations at any level may combine the features of a breed registry, a fanciers' membership organization, a competition governing body, a trade association, a preservation group, and other categories, and may be nonprofits or commercial enterprises. Similar species-specific clubs exist for various non-domesticated species, e.g. the Golden Conure Society and the American Fancy Rat and Mouse Association.

== See also ==
- Animal show
- Animals in sport
- Novelty pet
- Fandom, more generally
