= List of rail transport–related periodicals =

This is a list of some periodicals related to rail transport (or rail transportation).

== Asia ==
=== Japan ===
- Hobby of Model Railroading (1947– )
- Japan Railfan Magazine (1961– )

=== Sri Lanka ===
- Lanka Railway Digest - ISSN 2279-1213

== Australasia ==
=== Australia ===
==== National ====
- Australian Railway History ISSN 1449-6291
- Australian Transport ISSN 0311-628X 1974-1981
- Green over Red, 1966–1972
- Light Railways ISSN 0727-8101 1963-
- Locomotion ISSN 1835-4890
- Motive Power ISSN 1442-7079 1998–
- Narrow Gauge Down Under ISSN 1834-5565
- Network ISSN 0159-7302 1964–1999
- Railway Digest ISSN 0157-2431 1963–
- Railway Transportation 1954–1972
- Track & Signal ISSN 1327-418X
- Transit Australia ISSN 0818-5204 1946–2018
- Trolley Wire ISSN 0155-1264

==== New South Wales ====
- Roundhouse
- Tin Hare Gazette

==== Queensland ====
- Sunshine Express ISSN 0726-5093

==== South Australia ====
- Catch Point ISSN 2207-9114
- The Recorder ISSN 0158-1856 1963–1992

==== Tasmania ====
- Tasmanian Rail News ISSN 1321-0238

==== Victoria ====
- Newsrail ISSN 0310-7477

==== Western Australia ====
- The Westland ISSN 1835-6370

=== New Zealand ===
- New Zealand Railway Observer ISSN 0028-8624
- Tramway topics (196?-2015) ISSN 0110-599X

== Africa ==
=== Algeria ===
- Le Rail Maghreb

=== South Africa ===
- Railways Africa ISSN 1029-2756

== Europe ==
=== Croatia ===
- Željeznice 21
- Željezničar

=== France ===
- fr:Le Journal des chemins de fer
- La Vie du Rail

=== Germany ===
- Bahn-Report
- Der Eisenbahningenieur
- Eisenbahn Kurier
- Eisenbahntechnische Rundschau
- Modellbahntechnik aktuell ISSN 1866-2803 (2006- )
- Rail Business
- Signal und Draht

=== Italy ===
- Ingegneria Ferroviaria
- Tecnica Professionale
- Mondo Ferroviario
- Tutto Treno
- iTreni

=== Norway ===
- Lokaltrafikk ISSN 0802-1007
- På Sporet

=== Poland ===
- Concrete
- Rynek Kolejowy

=== Russia ===
- Tekhnika zheleznykh dorog

=== Switzerland ===
- Schweizer Eisenbahn-Revue

=== United Kingdom ===
- BackTrack ISSN 0955-5382 1987-
- British Railways Illustrated ISSN 0961-8244
- Continental Railway Journal ISSN 0306-6177
- European Rail Timetable (formerly the Thomas Cook European Timetable), 1873– , ISSN 1748-0817
- Great Western Railway Journal ISSN 0964-6809
- Heritage Railway ISSN 1466-3562 1999-
- International Railway Journal
- Locomotives International ISSN 1353-7091
- Metro Report International
- Modern Railways ISSN 0026-8356
- Modern Tramway ISSN 0144-1655
- Narrow Gauge World ISSN 1466-0180
- Rail ISSN 0953-4563
- Rail Business Intelligence (formerly Rail Privatisation News)
- Rail Express ISSN 1362-234X - also modelling
- Railnews 1963-
- Rail Professional ISSN 1476-2196
- Railway Bylines ISSN 0000-0000
- Railway Gazette International
- The Railway Magazine ISSN 0033-8923
- The Railway Observer ISSN 0952-7133
- Railways Illustrated ISSN 1479-2230
- Steam Days ISSN 0000-0000
- Steam Railway, 1979– , ISSN 0143-72320
- Railway World ISSN 0033-9032
- Steam World ISSN 0959-0897
- Thomas Cook Continental Timetable (now the European Rail Timetable), 1873–
- Today's Railways Europe ISSN 1354-2753
- Today's Railways UK (formerly Entrain) ISSN 1475-9713
- Tramway Review ISSN 0041-1019
- Tramways & Urban Transit (formerly Modern Tramway), ISSN 1460-8324 1938–

==== Defunct ====
- Bradshaw's Guide 1831–1961
- Diesel Railway Traction
- Herapath's Railway and Commercial Journal (incorrectly spelled "Herepath" in some sources)
- Locomotive, Railway Carriage & Wagon Review
- The Locomotive Magazine 1896–1959
- Locomotives Illustrated ISSN 0307-1804 (1975-2008)
- MLI Plus (2021-2024)
- Modern Locomotives Illustrated ISSN 1756-8188 (2008-2021)
- Railway Herald 1885–1903
- The Railway System Illustrated
- Trains & Railways

==== Modelling ====
- British Railway Modelling ISSN 0968-0764
- GardenRail ISSN 0969-952X
- Model Rail ISSN 1369-5118
- Model Railway Constructor ISSN 0026-735X (Mid-1930s – June 1987)
- Model Railway Journal (Jan 1985-date)
- Model Railway News (1925-Aug 1971), thereafter Model Railways (Sep 1971-Sep 1984), thereafter Your Model Railway ISSN 0026-7368 (Oct 1984-Jun 1985), thereafter Your Model Railway ISSN 0267-7016 (Jul 1985-Jun 1987), thereafter back to Model Railways (Jul 1987-Feb 1994), ceased
- Narrow Gauge and Industrial Railway Modelling Review ISSN 0958-0808 (1989 to present)
- Practical Model Railways ISSN 0265-3087 (Dec 1983-Feb 1989), ceased
- Railway Modeller ISSN 0033-8931

== North America ==
=== Canada ===
- Canadian Rail

=== United States ===
- Classic Trains
- Classic Toy Trains
- CTC Board, ISSN 0164-8373
- Electric Railway Journal, ISSN 0095-9715
- Extra 2200 South, ISSN 0014-1380
- Live Steam and Outdoor Railroading
- Model Railroader ISSN 0026-7341
- Narrow Gauge and Shortline Gazette
- The New Electric Railway Journal; ISSN 1048-3845
- Pacific RailNews ISSN 8750-8486
- Passenger Train Journal, ISSN 0160-6913
- Progressive Railroading
- Rail News
- Railfan & Railroad ISSN 0163-7266
- Railroad Gazette
- Railroad Man's Magazine ISSN 0033-8761
- Railroad Model Craftsman ISSN 0033-877X
- Railroads Illustrated ISSN 1071-8311
- Railway Age, ISSN 0079-9505
- Railway Track & Structures, ISSN 0033-9016
- Tall Timber Short Lines
- Trains, ISSN 0041-0934

== International ==
- European Rail Timetable (formerly the Thomas Cook European Timetable, or Continental Timetable before 1988), 1873– , ISSN 1748-0817
- International Railway Journal (IRJ), ISSN 0744-5326
- Janes World Railways, ISSN 0075-3084
- Metro Report International
- Railway Gazette International, ISSN 0373-5346
- Today's Railways Europe, ISSN 1354-2753
- Tramways & Urban Transit (formerly Modern Tramway), ISSN 1460-8324 1938–

== Institutional ==
- Institution of Civil Engineers
- Institution of Mechanical Engineers
- Institution of Railway Signal Engineers
- Permanent Way Institution - Journal and report of proceedings

== See also ==
- Rail transport periodical
