= Railfest =

Rail festival held at the National Railway Museum, York, England

Railfest (or Railway Festival) is a term used by railway museums and heritage railways around the world on open days and special annual events.

The events are usually fundraising-oriented, and also involved with showing features of museums and their contents not always available in normal visiting times. The term is found in the United States, United Kingdom and Australia for such events.

== National Railway Museum ==
Railfest is the name given to occasional railway festivals at the National Railway Museum in York, England. There was a Railfest in 2004, and another in 2012. The 2012 event was sponsored by EMAP magazines Rail, Steam Railway and Model Rail.

=== 2000 ===
The 2000 event was promoted as being a celebration of 200 years of Steam.

=== 2004 ===
The 2004 event featured a Class 171 Turbostar DMU, a Class 375 Electrostar EMU, a Class 390 Pendolino EMU and a Eurostar train.

=== 2012 ===
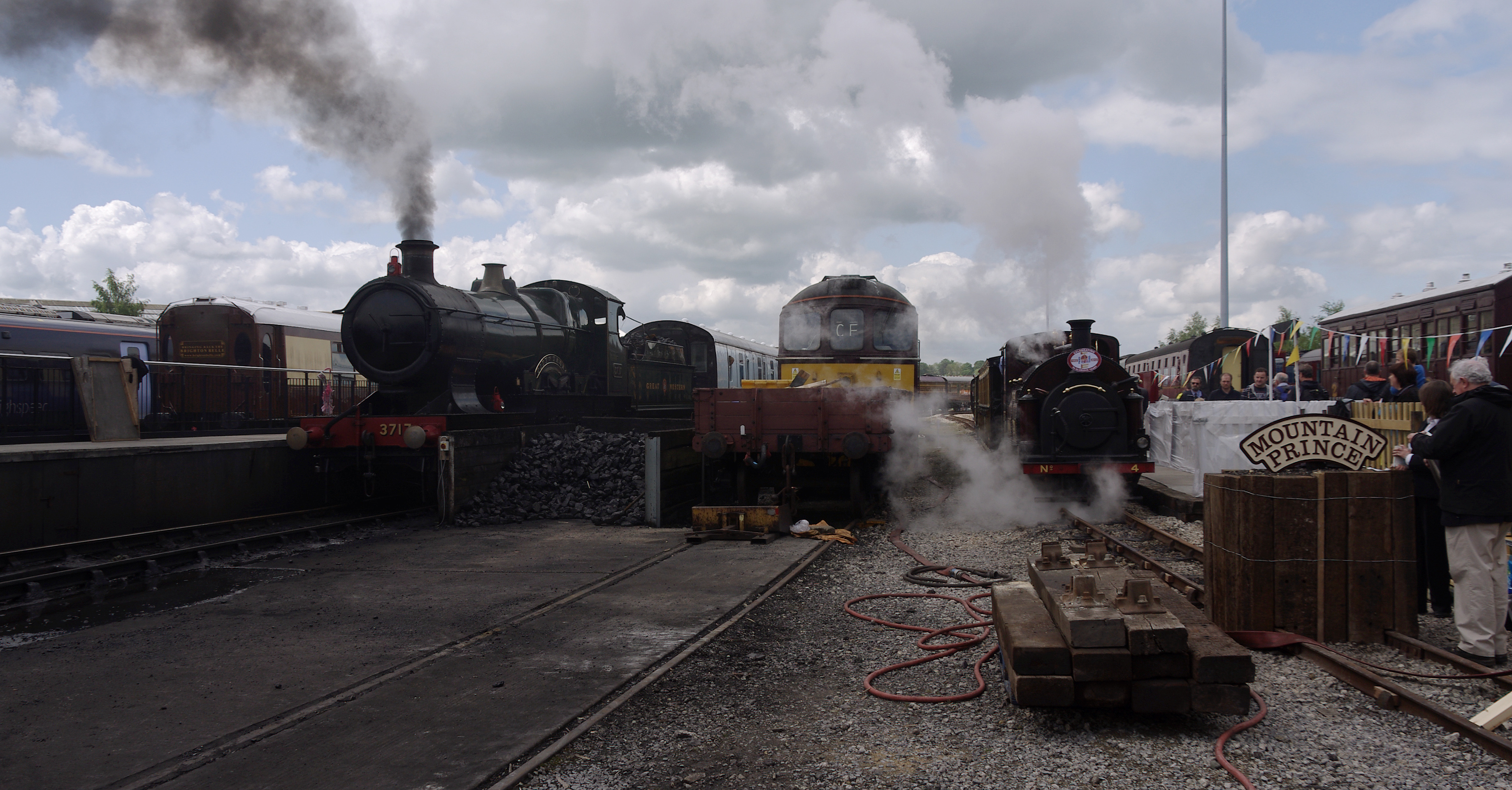
City of Truro, 33207 and Palmerston at NRM York Railfest 2012.

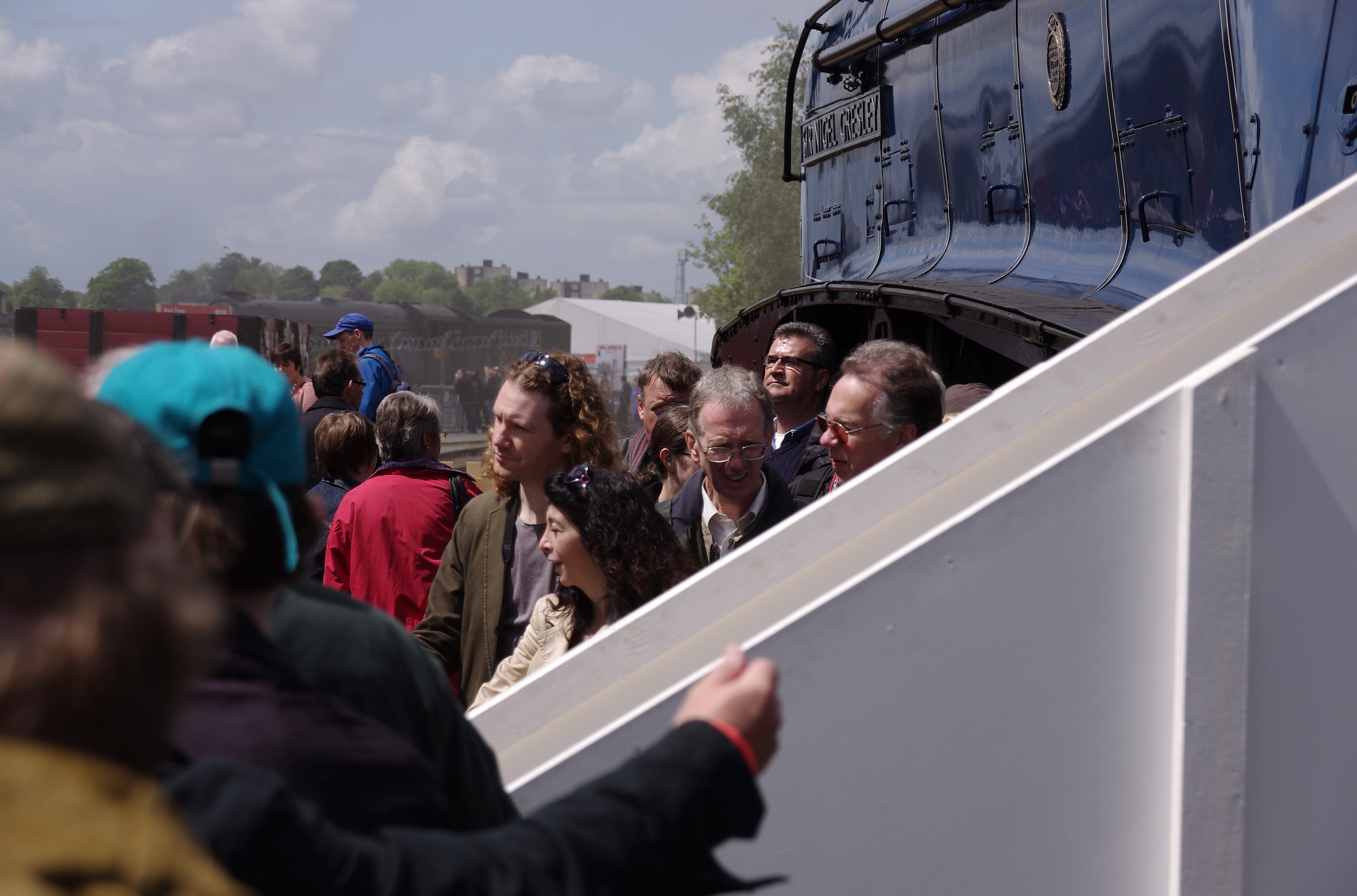
Visitors queue up to climb into the cab of 60007 Sir Nigel Gresley at Railfest 2012

The 2012 event had the theme of record breakers, and featured exhibits such as

- Prototype HST power car 41001
- HST power car 43159, which jointly holds the diesel rail speed record.
- LNER Peppercorn Class A1 60163 Tornado
- GWR 3700 Class 3440 City of Truro
- LNER Class A4 4468 Mallard, holder of the steam rail speed record.
- Class 395 Javelin EMU 395019
- GNR Class N2 No. 1744
