= Today's Railways =

Today's Railways may refer to two railway magazines published by Platform 5 Publishing:

- Today's Railways Europe, ISSN 1354-2753
- Today's Railways UK, ISSN 1475-9713
