= TAUT =

TAUT is an acronym or initialism and may refer to:

- Tramways & Urban Transit, a monthly magazine published in the United Kingdom

== See also ==
- Taut, for the word or name
