= Pilatus Railway =

Steepest rack railway in the world, in Switzerland

Coordinates: 46°57′20″N 8°16′37″E

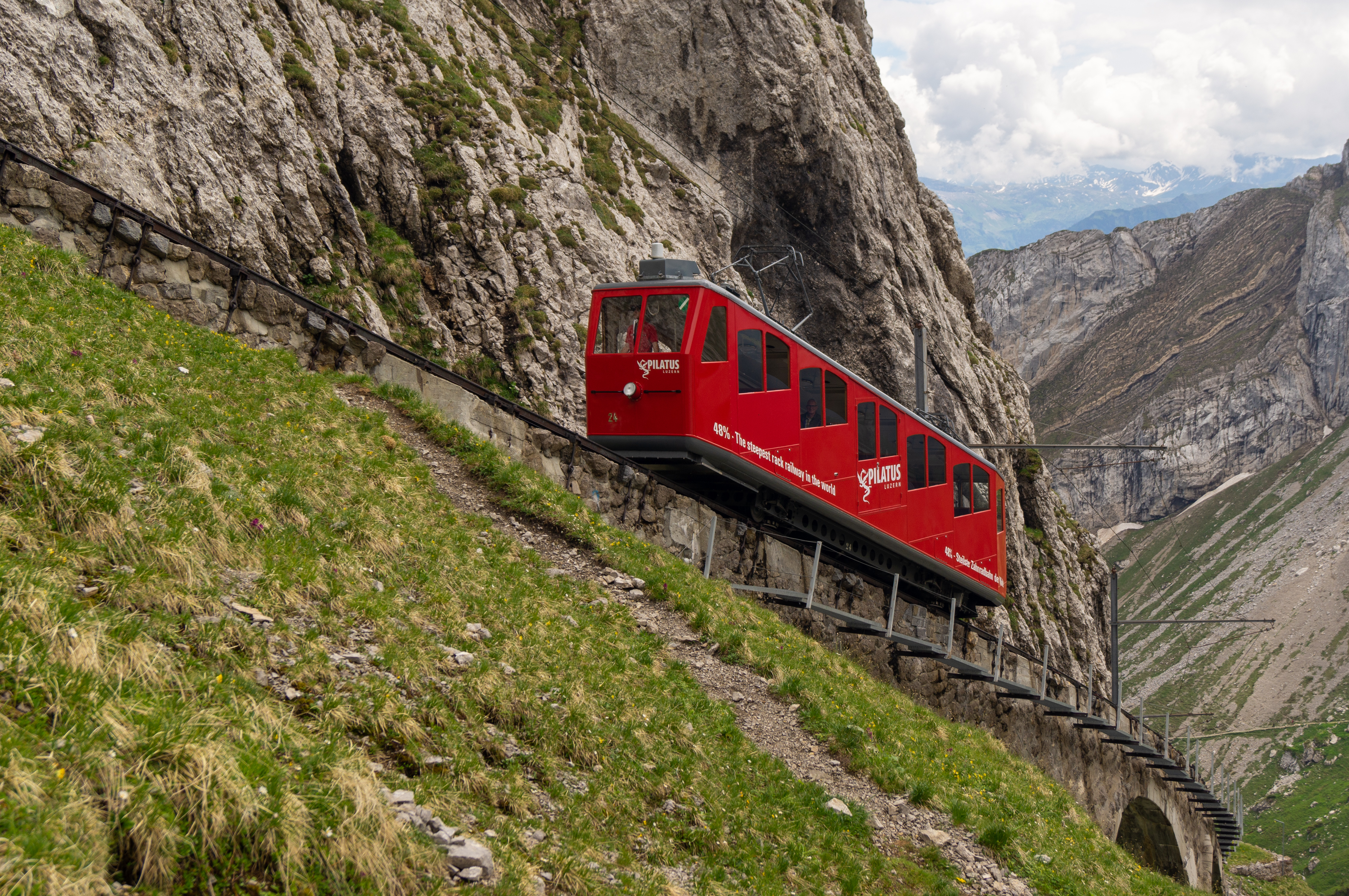
- A train on the final section

Overview
- Native name: Pilatusbahn
- Status: Operational
- Owner: Pilatus-Bahnen AG
- Locale: Obwalden, Switzerland
- Termini: Alpnachstad; Pilatus Kulm
- Stations: 5

Service
- Services: 1

History
- Opened: 4 June 1889 (steam), reopened 15 May 1937

Technical
- Line length: 4.6 km (2.86 mi)
- Rack system: Locher
- Track gauge: 800 mm (2 ft 7 1/2 in)
- Electrification: 1,650 V DC overhead line
- Operating speed: 9 km/h (5.6 mph) downhill, about 10 km/h (6.2 mph) uphill.
- Highest elevation: 2,073 m (6,801 ft)
- Maximum incline: 48 %

The Pilatus Railway (German: Pilatusbahn, PB) is a mountain railway in Switzerland and the steepest rack railway in the world, with a maximum gradient of 48% and an average gradient of 35%. The line runs from Alpnachstad, on Lake Alpnach, to a terminus near the Esel summit of Pilatus at an elevation of 2,073 m (6,801 ft), which makes it the highest railway in the canton of Obwalden and the second highest in Central Switzerland after the Furka line. At Alpnachstad, the Pilatus Railway connects with steamers on Lake Lucerne and with trains on the Brünigbahn line of Zentralbahn.

== History ==
The first project to build the line was proposed in 1873, suggesting a 1,435 mm (4 ft 8 1/2 in) standard gauge and 25% maximal gradient. It was concluded that the project was not economically viable. Eduard Locher, an engineer with great practical experience, proposed an alternative project with the maximum grade increased to 48%, cutting the distance in half. Conventional systems at the time could not negotiate such gradients because the cogwheel that is pressed to the rack from above may, under higher gradients, jump out of engagement with the rack, eliminating the train's driving and braking power. Instead, Locher placed a horizontal double rack between the two rails with the rack teeth facing each side. This was engaged by two flanged cogwheels mounted on vertical shafts underneath the car.

This design eliminated the possibility of the cogwheels climbing out of the rack, and prevented the car from toppling over, even under severe crosswinds common in the area. The system was also capable of guiding the car without the need for flanges on the wheels. Indeed, the first cars on Pilatus had no flanges on running wheels, but they were later added to allow cars to be moved through tracks without rack rails during maintenance. Construction began in March 1886, and it took four hundred working days during the summer months of three years to complete. Six hundred laborers, mostly Italians, were employed. The line was opened on 4 June 1889, and was electrified in 1937, using an overhead electric supply of 1,650 V DC. The first year the line counted 35,000 passengers, by 1901 a million had travelled on top of the Pilatus by rail.

The government provided no subsidy for the construction of the line. Instead, Locher established his own company "Locher Systems" to build the railway. The railway was built entirely with private capital and has remained financially viable throughout its life. New energy-efficient trains built by Stadler Rail were introduced in 2023.

The Pilatus Railway was named a Historic Mechanical Engineering Landmark by the American Society of Mechanical Engineers in 2001.

== Gallery ==
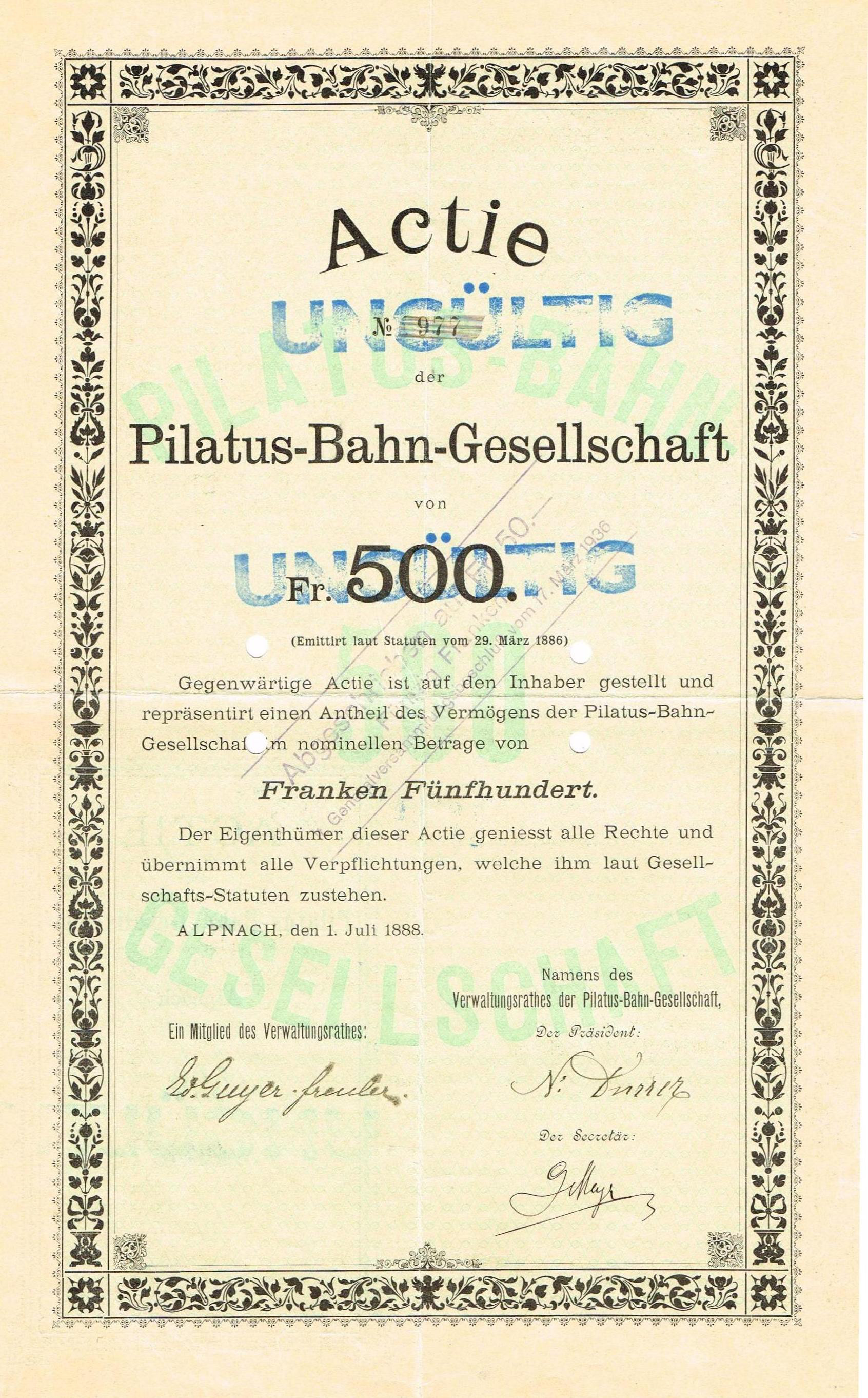
Share of the Pilatus Railway Company, issued 1. July 1888; founder's share

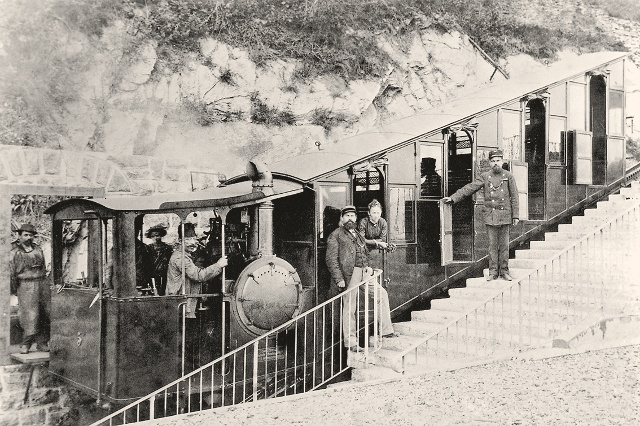
The train ready to leave, 4 June 1889

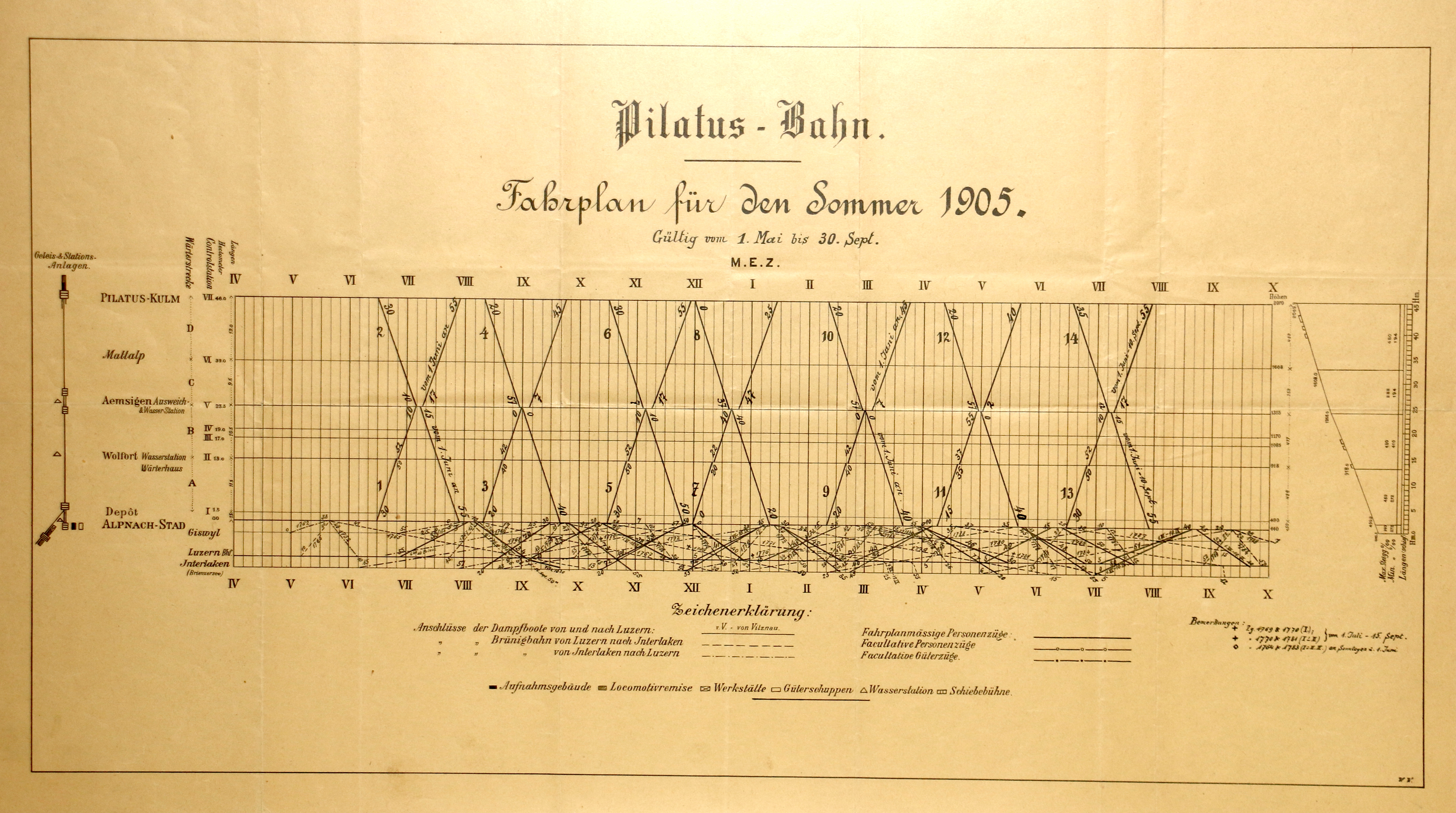
Pilatus Railway Time Table from 1905

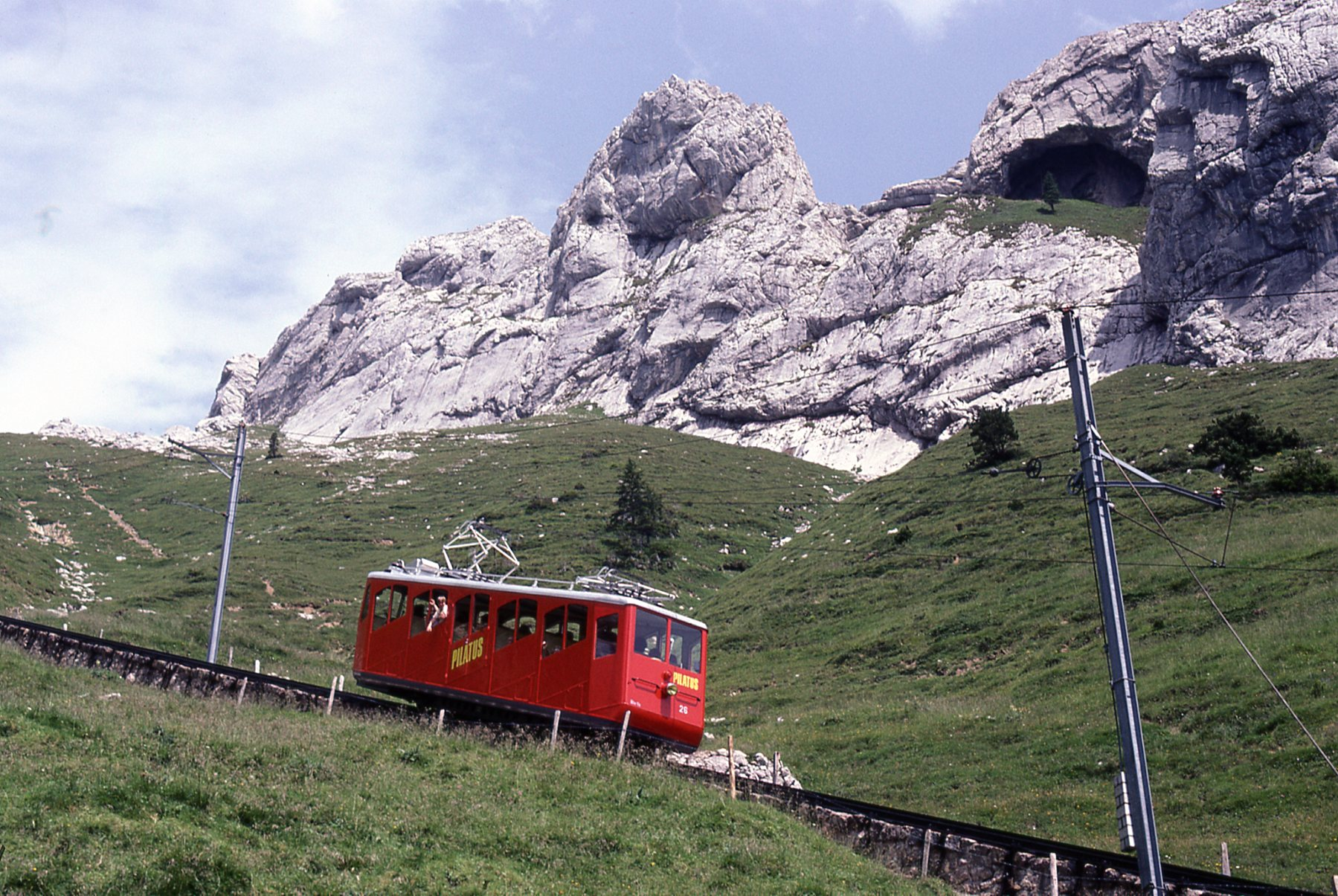
Railcar in 1981

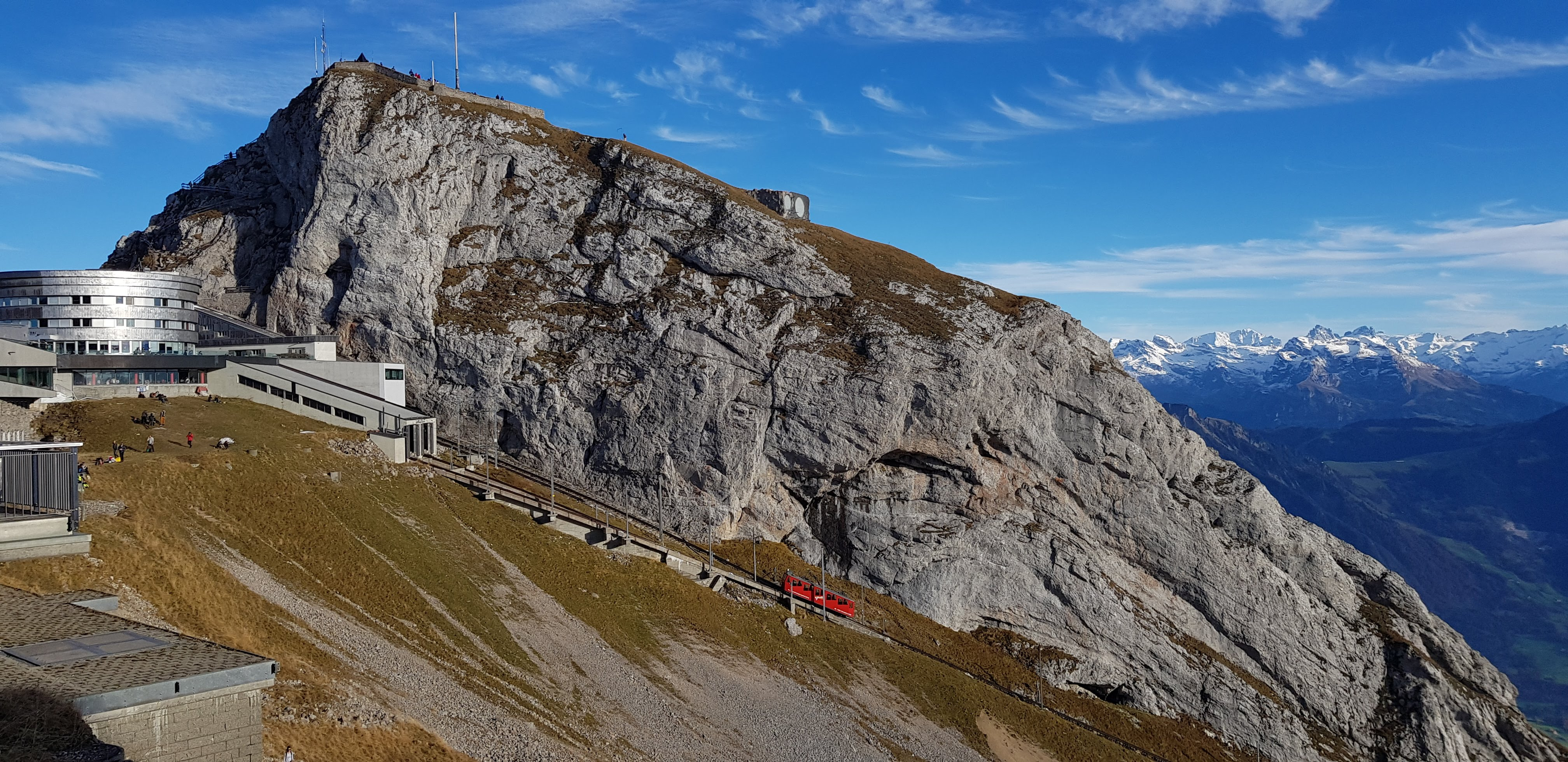
Railcar approaching the summit station

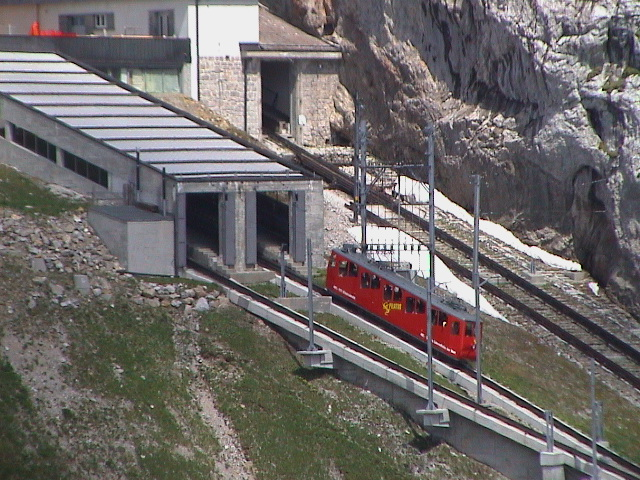
A railcar at the summit station

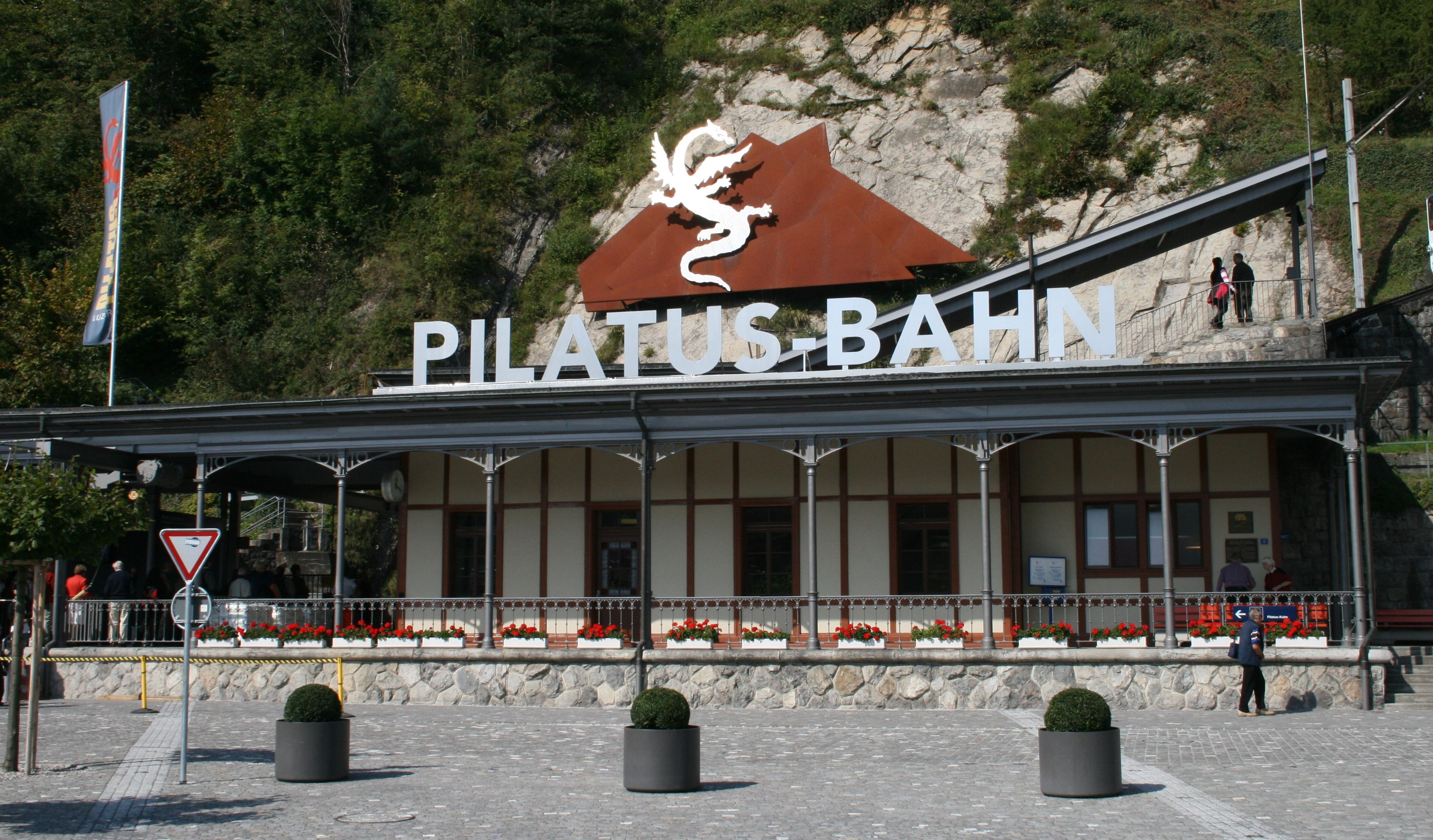
Alpnachstad station; note the inclination of the platform behind the building

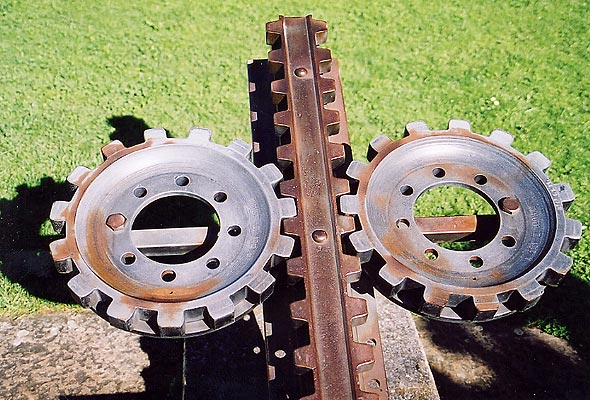
The Locher system rack and pinion

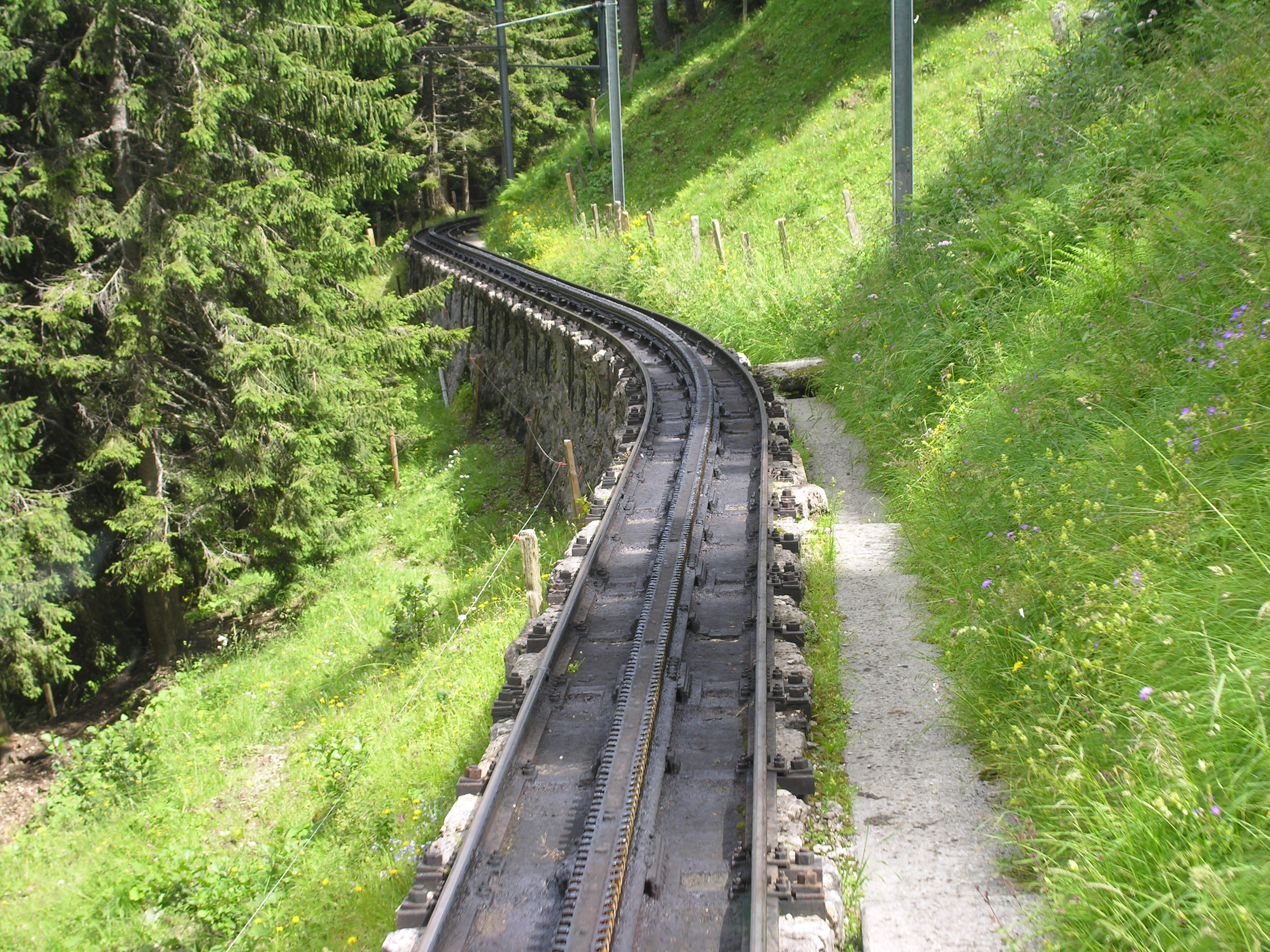
The tracks are laid without ballast.

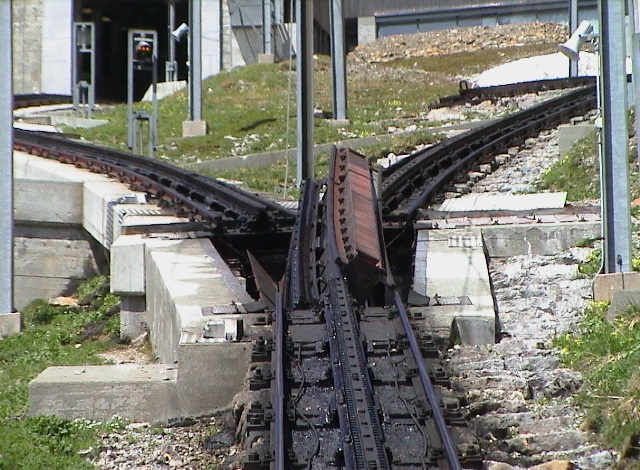
A turnout consisting of a bridge that rotates about its lengthwise axle

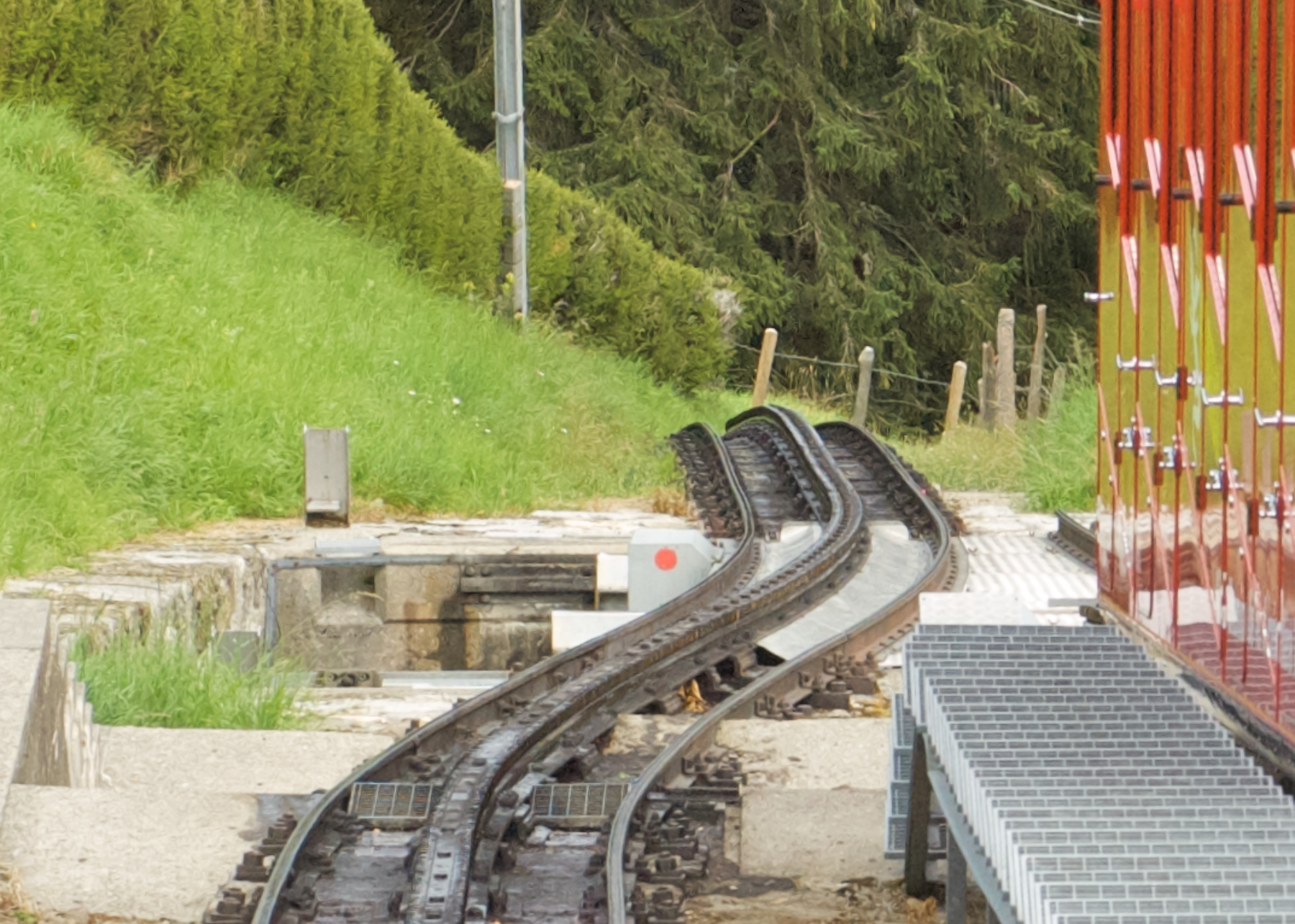
Pilatus Railway Sliding Switch

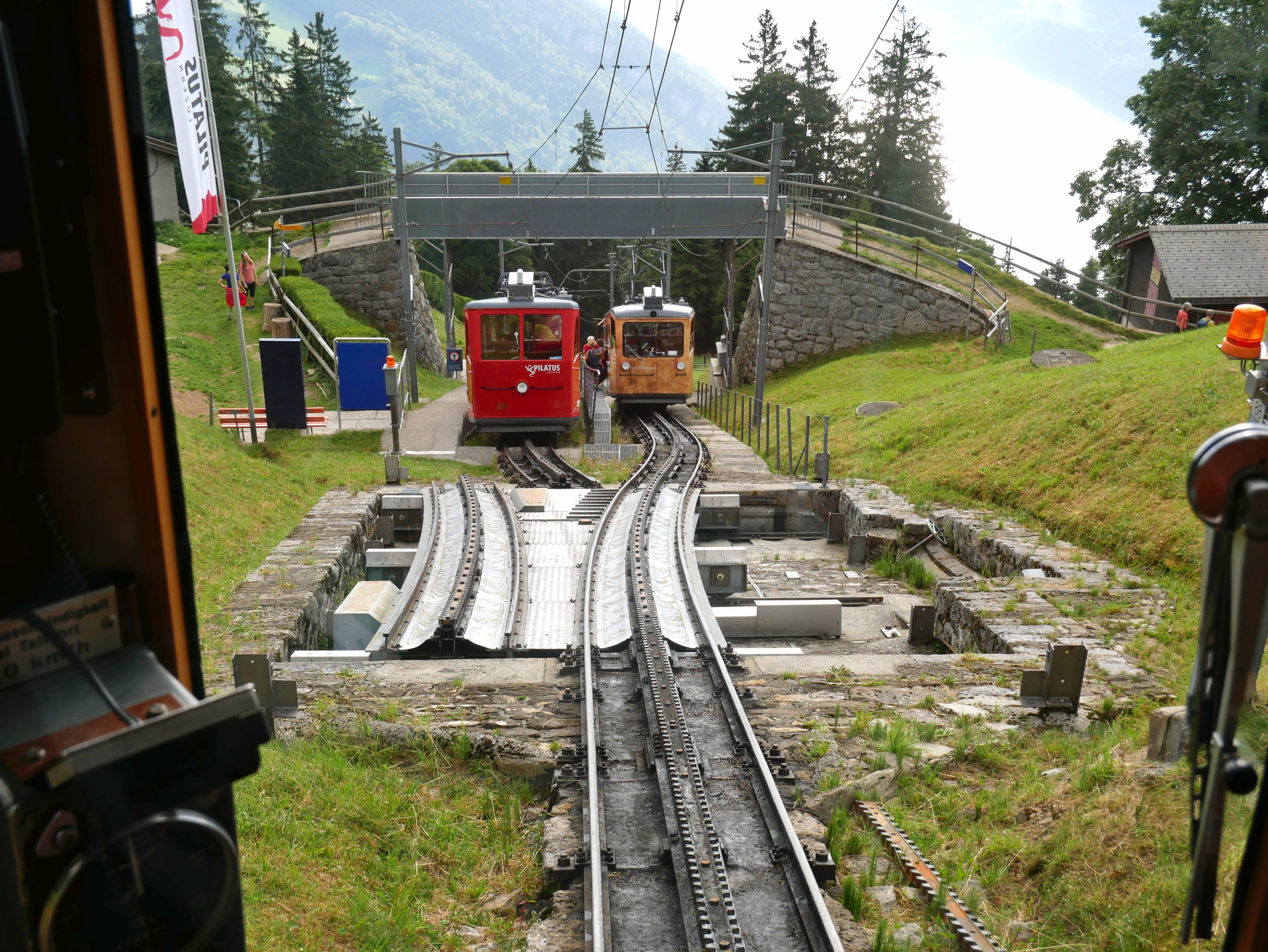
Railcars at the midpoint switch

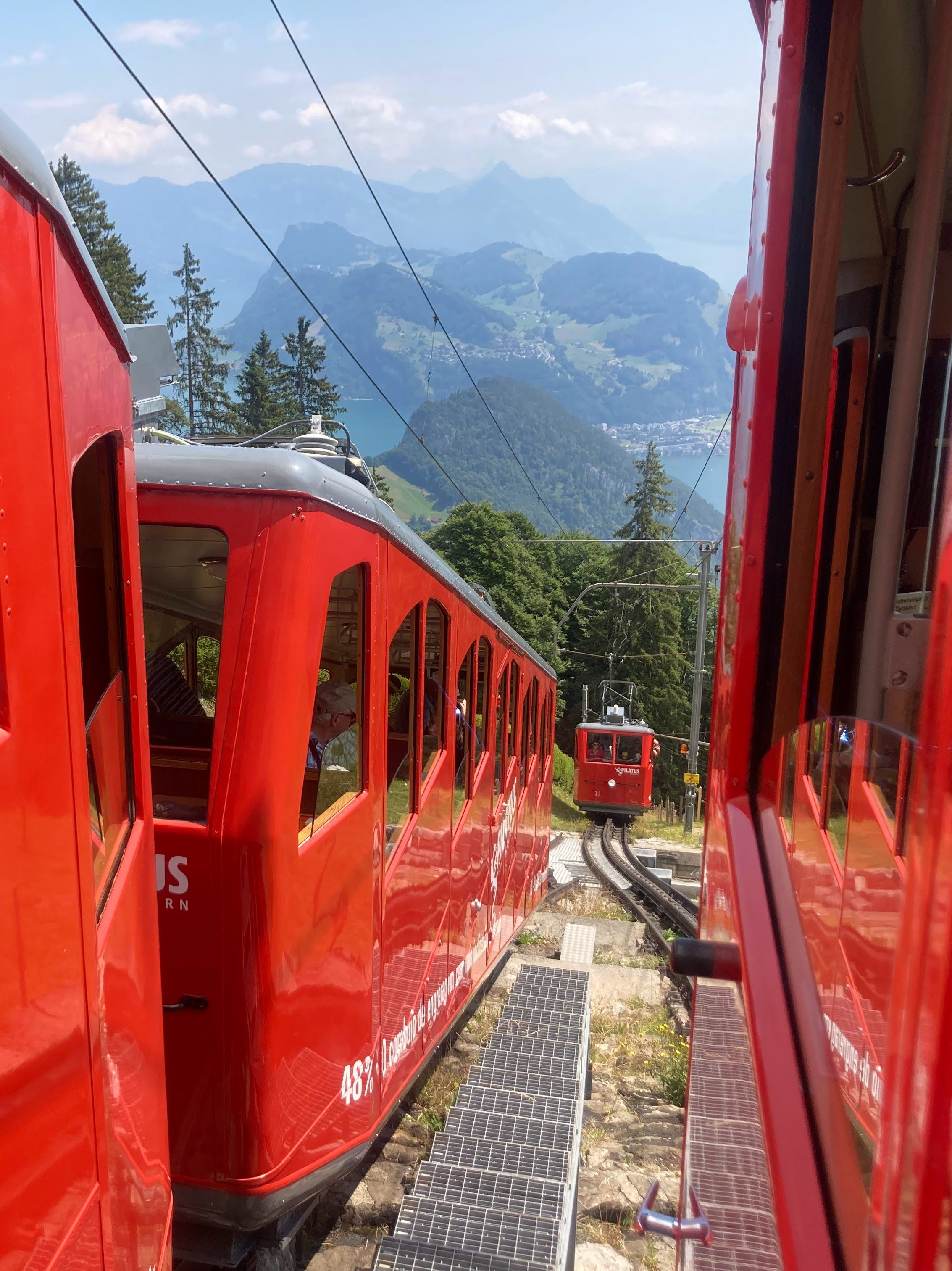
Final railcar of a group approaches the midpoint

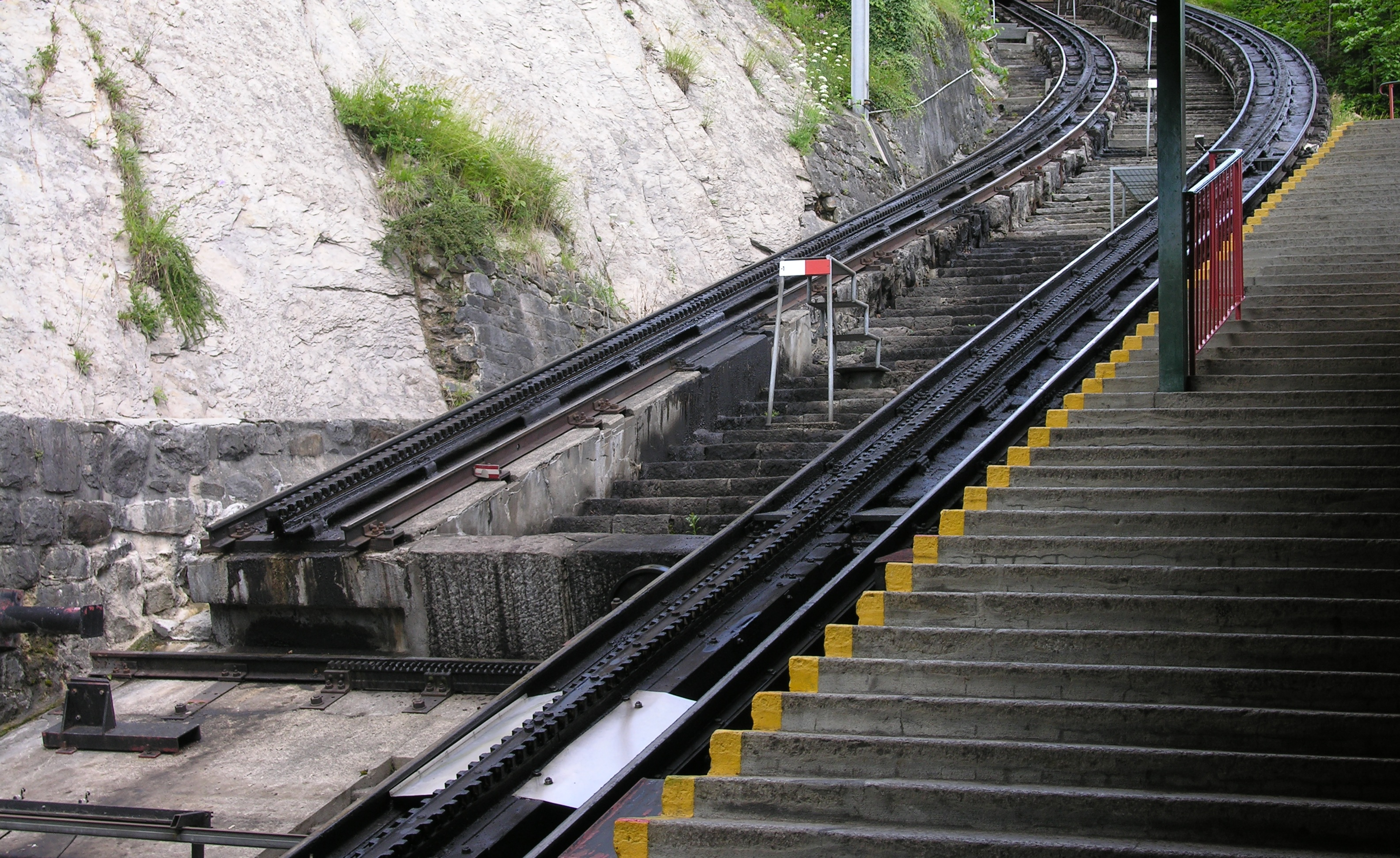
The two row transfer table in Pilatus Railway, one edge also serving as a passenger platform

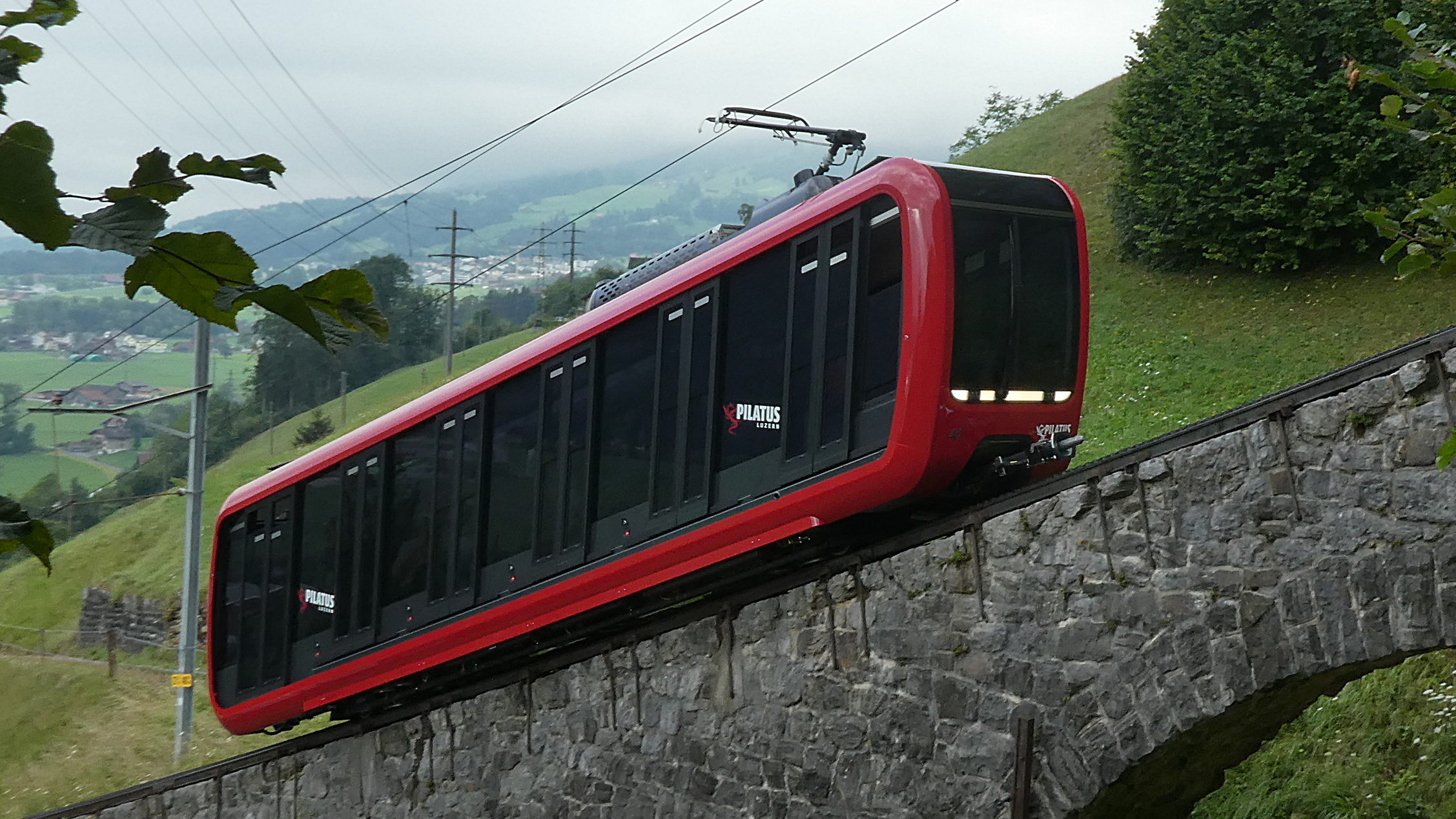
Pilatus Bahn Bhe 2v2 railcars by Stadler Rail, introduced in 2022

== Operation ==
The line is 4.6 km (2.86 mi) long, climbs a vertical distance of 1,629 m (5,344 ft), and is of 800 mm (2 ft 7 1/2 in) gauge. Because of the rack-system, there are no conventional points or switches on the line, only rotary switches (see photograph) and traversers. All rails are laid on solid rock, securing rails by high-strength iron ties attached to the rock, without using any ballast.

The line still uses original rack rails that are now over 100 years old. Despite being worn down, it was discovered that this can be fixed by simply turning the rails over, providing a new wearing surface that would be sufficient for some time. The cars' electric motors are used as generators to brake the car during descent, but this electricity is not reused — it is dissipated as heat through resistance grids. Originally, the steam engines were used as compressors to provide dynamic braking, since the use of friction brakes alone is not practical on very steep slopes.

The line is operated seasonally from May to October. The cable car, which approaches from the other side, runs all year except for a short maintenance period.

== See also ==
- List of mountain railways in Switzerland
- List of heritage railways and funiculars in Switzerland
- Rail transport in Switzerland

== Sources ==
- Book Tramways and Light Railways of Switzerland and Austria, ISBN 0-900433-96-5, by R.J.Buckley, published by the Light Rail Transit Association, 1984.
