= Richard Bowker (British businessman) =

English businessman (born 1966)

- Born: 23 April 1966 (age 60); Oldham
- Education: Queen Elizabeth's Grammar School; Leicester University
- Occupation: chief executive

Steven Richard Bowker CBE (born 23 April 1966) is former chairman and chief executive of the Strategic Rail Authority, a former chief executive of National Express and Etihad Rail, and also a former chairman of UK Athletics and independent director of the English Football League.

== Career ==
Bowker was born in Oldham in 1966. He was the son of Roger Bowker (born 1941), who would go on to have a long career as a senior manager in the bus industry, latterly working for Stagecoach Group and Brian Souter. Bowker attended Queen Elizabeth's Grammar School, Blackburn, read economics at Leicester University, and played as a professional session pianist for a year.

In 1989 he joined the London Underground as a graduate finance trainee, where he qualified as a chartered management accountant. In the course of this work, he was credited with the launch of a new leasing system for trains in 1997. Bowker was appointed co-chairman of Virgin Rail Group in 1999 and commercial director of the Virgin Group in 2000. He also founded the transport consultancy Quasar Associates.

In 2001 he was appointed chairman and chief executive of the Strategic Rail Authority. While in this role he was made a CBE in the 2004 New Year's Honours List. In 2006, he was appointed chief executive of National Express Group. From 2009 to 2012 he acted as chief executive of Etihad Rail in the United Arab Emirates.

In 2012 he was appointed as the second ever independent non-executive director of the English Football League. In 2017 he replaced Ed Warner as chairman of UK Athletics. Less than two years later he resigned ahead of a vote of no confidence.

He has also served as a non-executive director of British Waterways and of the London Marathon.

Since 2023 Bowker has co-presented Green Signals, a regular podcast discussing current events in the UK rail sector, together with Nigel Harris, former managing editor of the UK industry magazine Rail.
