= Rail Enthusiast =

Rail Enthusiast may refer to:

- Railfan
- Rail (magazine); English magazine originally named Rail Enthusiast
