= Tramway Review =

- A cover of Tramway Review from 2024
- Categories: Tramway enthusiasm
- Frequency: Quarterly
- Format: A5
- Founded: 1950
- Company: Light Rail Transit Association
- Country: United Kingdom
- Based in: Orton Southgate
- Language: English
- Website: www.lrta.org/category/tramway-review/
- ISSN: 0041-1019
- OCLC: 7109602

Tramway Review, initially known as The Tramway Review, is a British quarterly magazine about the history of tramways in Great Britain and, to a lesser extent, neighbouring countries, published since 1950. Its content is intended for tramway enthusiasts interested in the history of the town tramway systems of the United Kingdom and Ireland.

From 1950 until 2007 the magazine was published by the Light Railway Transport League (LRTL), since 1979 known as the Light Rail Transit Association (LRTA). The same organisation has published the monthly magazine, Tramways & Urban Transit (also known as Modern Tramway, a longstanding previous title), since 1938. The LRTL launched Tramway Review in 1950 to allow Modern Tramway to focus on present and future tramways and ongoing news developments, with Tramway Review focussed on history and closed systems.

In mid-2007, publication of Tramway Review and Tramways & Urban Transit was taken over by a newly formed company, LRTA Publishing Ltd.

== Format ==
With some very minor variations, the magazine has always been published in A5 format. Initially only printed in black-and-white, colour graphics were introduced on the cover in the 1960s. The cover photograph remained black-and-white, but in 2004 a colour photograph appeared on the cover for the first time, with issue 200.

== See also ==
- List of railway-related periodicals
- List of modern tramway and light rail systems in the United Kingdom
- List of town tramway systems in the United Kingdom
