= LRMT =

LRMT may refer to:

- Lahore Rapid Mass Transit System, a planned transit system in Pakistan
- Light Rail and Modern Tramway, a monthly international magazine published in the United Kingdom
- Lagos Rail Mass Transit, Rail Transit system in Lagos, Nigerria
