= Motive power =

Motive power may refer to:

- In thermodynamics, natural agents such as water or steam, wind or electricity, that do work
- In mechanics, the mechanical energy associated with the motion and position of an object
- In physics, a synonym for power
- In mechanical engineering, the source of mechanical power of a propulsion system

It may also refer to:

- Motive power, a colloquial term for a railway locomotive
- Motive Power, an Australian railway magazine
- Motive power depot, a railway running shed
- Electric Motive Power, an English electric car
- MotivePower, a subsidiary of Wabtec
