= Eduard Locher =

Swiss engineer (1840–1910)

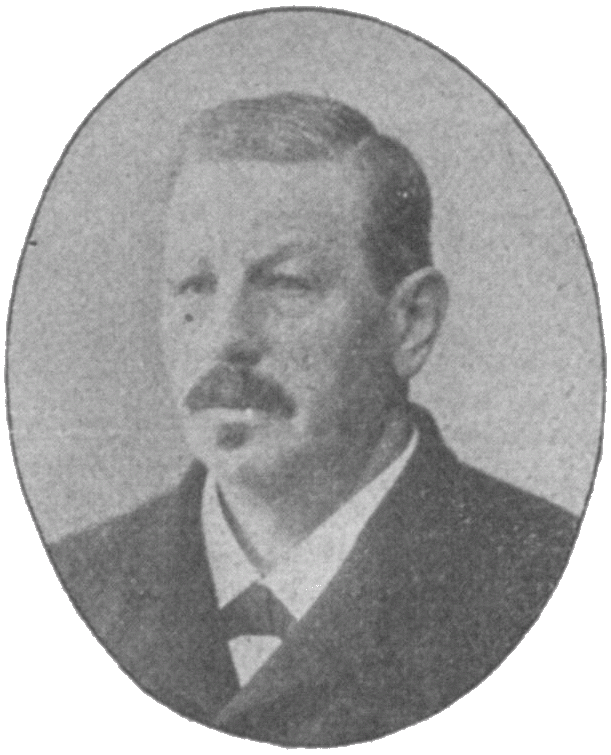
Eduard Locher

Eduard Locher (15 January 1840 in Zurich – 2 June 1910 in Zurich) was a Swiss engineer, inventor and independent contractor who received a doctorate honoris causa for his work. He devised the Locher rack railway system and built his privately owned Pilatus Railway that uses this system.

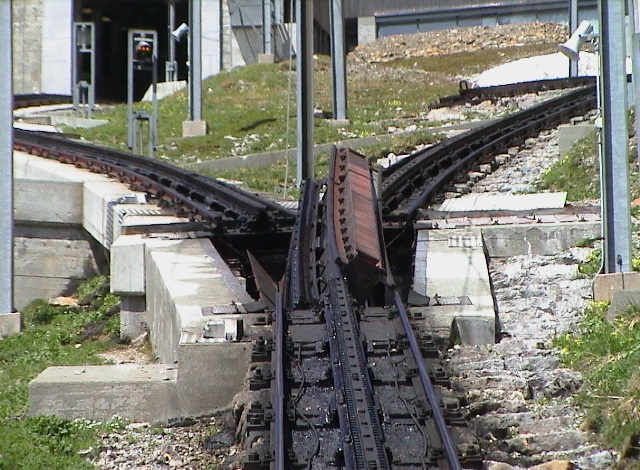
A turnout consisting of a bridge that rotates about its lengthwise axle

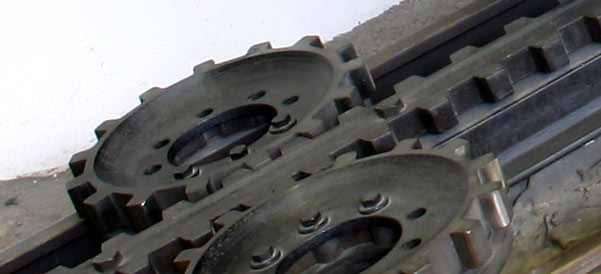
Locher rack system

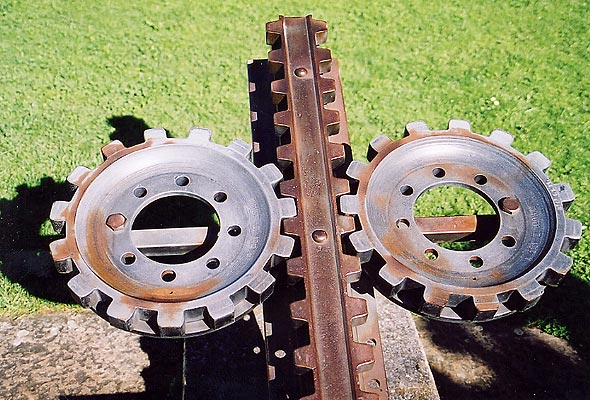
Locher rack system (seen from above)

The Locher rack system invented by Eduard Locher, has gear teeth cut in the sides rather than the top of the rail, engaged by two cog wheels on the locomotive. This system allows use on steeper grades than the other systems, whose teeth could jump out of the rack. It is used on the Pilatus Railway.

Locher set out to design a rack system that could be used on gradients as steep as 1 in 2 (50%). The Abt system - the most common rack system in Switzerland at the time - was limited to a maximum gradient of 1 in 4 (25%). Locher showed that on steeper grade, the Abt system was prone to the driving pinion over-riding the rack, causing potentially catastrophic derailments, as predicted by Dr. Abt. To overcome this problem and allow a rack line up the steep sides of Mt. Pilatus, Locher developed a rack system where the rack is a flat bar with symmetrical, horizontal teeth. Horizontal pinions engage the centrally mounted bar, both driving the locomotive and keeping it centered on the track.

This system provides very stable attachment to the track, also protecting the car from toppling over even under the most severe crosswinds. Such gears are also capable of leading the car, so even flanges on running wheels are optional. The biggest shortcoming of the system is that the standard railway switch is not usable, and a transfer table or other complex device must be used where branching of the track is needed.

Following tests, the Locher system was deployed on the Pilatus Railway, which opened in 1889. No other public railway uses the Locher system, although some European coal mines use a similar system on steeply graded underground lines.
