= 1922 Locomotive Cyclopedia of American Practice =

American locomotive dictionary and encyclopedia

The 1922 Locomotive Cyclopedia of American Practice, published by Simmons-Boardman – its 6th edition – is the most recent locomotive [en]cyclopedia to be in the public domain. At 1141 pages of main text, plus indexes, front matter, and other content, it is a substantial book.

The cyclopedia is essentially a combined catalog for all the major builders of railroad locomotives and associated equipment in North America, who provided the information. It contains a dictionary of terms and photographs and scale drawings of several hundred locomotive types exemplifying those that North American builders were producing in the early 1920s.

The book resulted from a resolution at the 38th annual convention of the Railway Master Mechanics' Association in 1905 that

whereas it is deemed desirable to change the arrangement of data in the book formerly known as the Locomotive Dictionary, be it resolved that ... the editorial and manufacturers' data be grouped in sections as follows: definitions; locomotives as complete units; locomotive details; tenders; electric locomotives; materials; industrial and foreign locomotives; shop equipment and operation; rules; miscellaneous.

The book can sometimes be purchased second-hand. Google Play Books has published the first 572 pages electronically, and the entire 1232-page 1938 (10th) edition. Depending on whether or not copyright was renewed, the latter edition may be in copyright.

== Picture gallery ==
Illustrations from the 1922 Locomotive Cyclopedia:

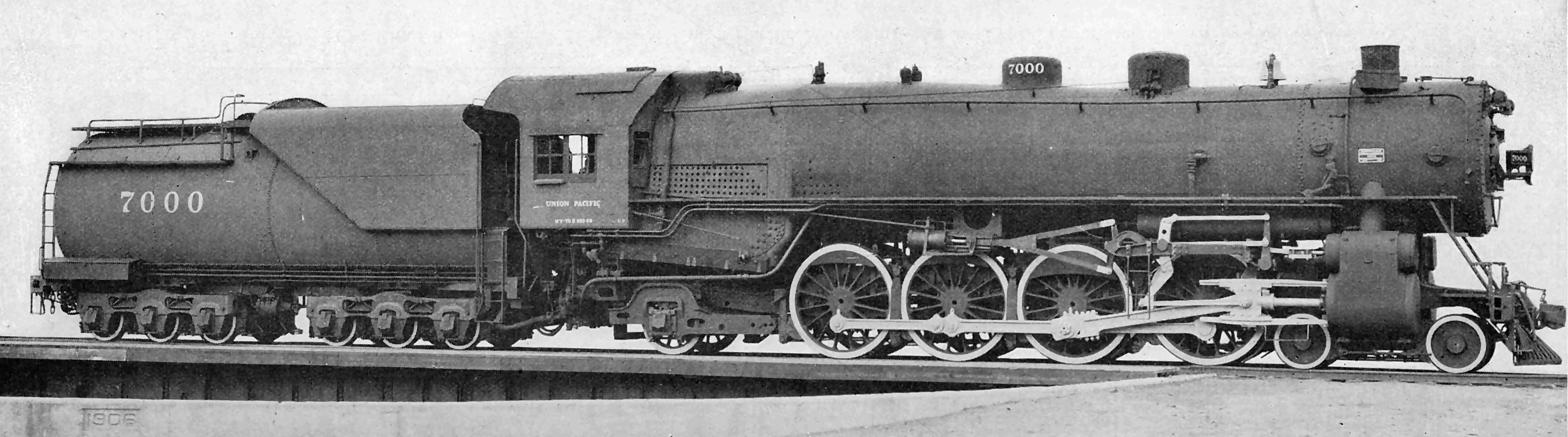
4-8-2 locomotive

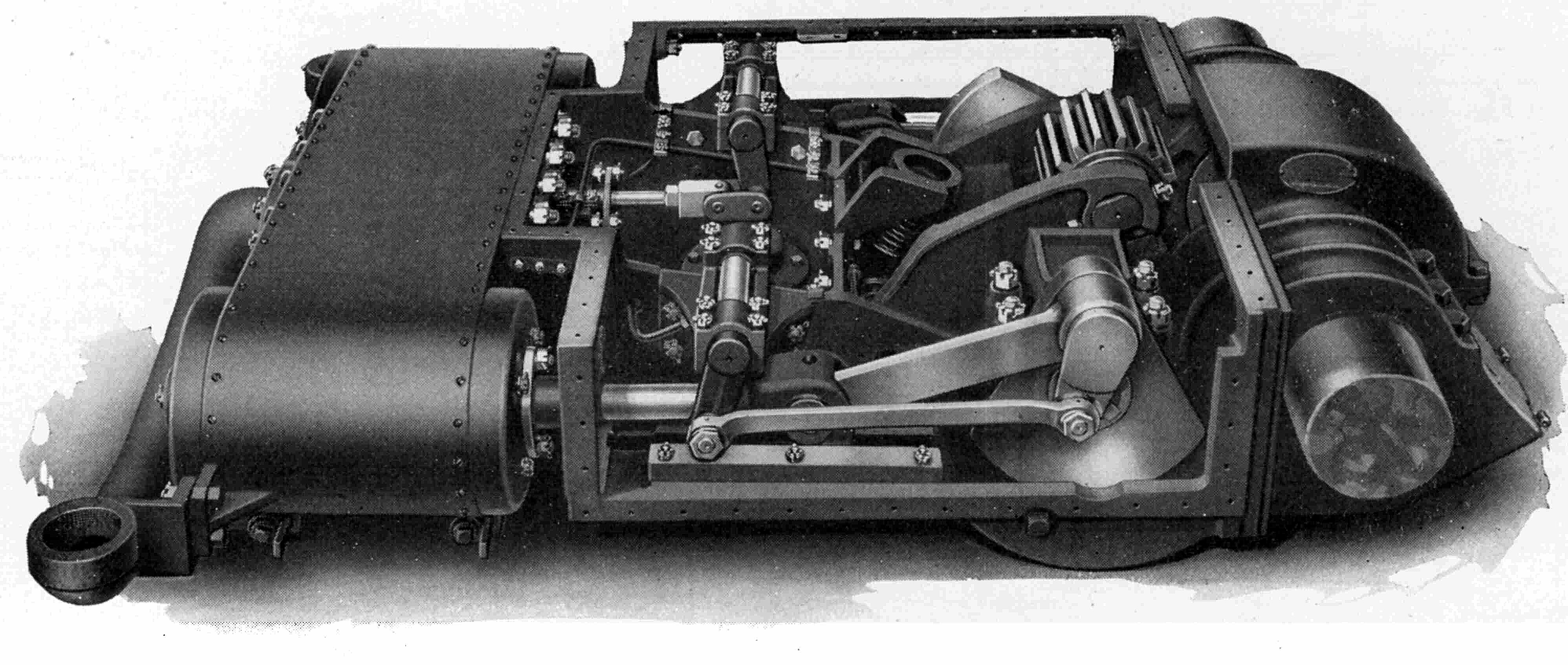
Franklin Booster

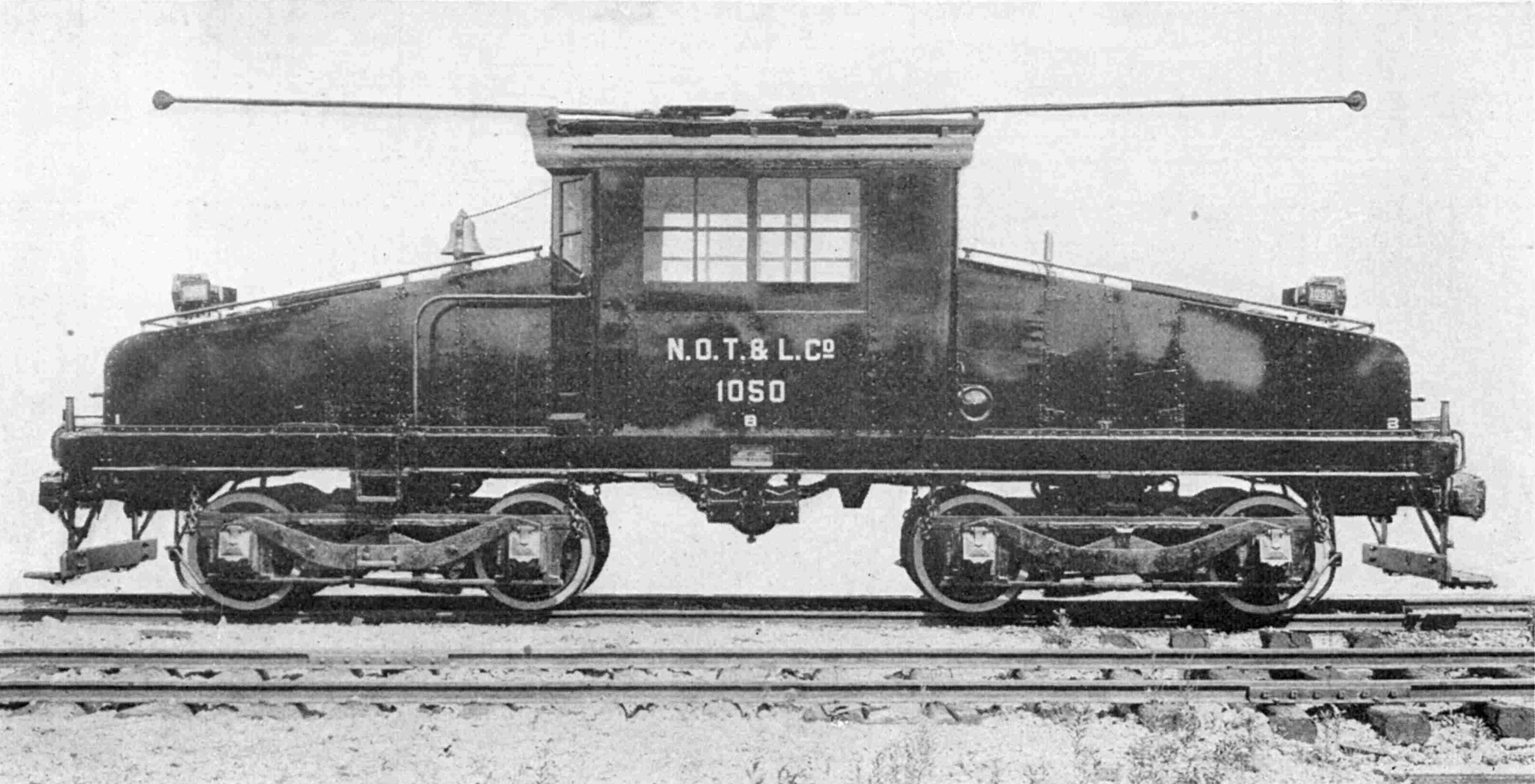
GE Steeplecab
