= Concrete (disambiguation) =

Concrete is a composite material composed of aggregate and a binder.

Concrete may also refer to:

== Arts and entertainment ==
- Concrete (comics), a comic book series by Paul Chadwick
- Concrete (film), a 2004 Japanese film based on the Junko Furuta murder
- Concrete (novel), a 1982 novel by Thomas Bernhard

=== Music ===
- The Concretes, a Swedish indie pop band

=== Albums ===
- The Concretes (album), 2003
- Concrete (Fear Factory album), 2002
- Concrete (Pet Shop Boys album), 2006
- Concrete (Izzy Stradlin album), 2008
- Concrete (Sunny Sweeney album), 2011
- Concrete, by 999, 1981

=== Songs ===
- "Concrete", by Shame
- "Concrete", by As It Is from Never Happy, Ever After
- "Concrete", by Crystal Castles from Amnesty (I)
- "Concrete", by E-40 from Revenue Retrievin': Graveyard Shift
- "Concrete", by Haley Blais from Wisecrack
- "Concrete", by Lovejoy from Pebble Brain
- "Concrete", by Poppy from I Disagree
- "Concrete", by Teyana Taylor from The Album
- "Concrete", by Tom Odell from Wrong Crowd

=== Publications ===
- Concrete (student newspaper), at the University of East Anglia in Norwich
- Concrete (magazine), a Polish graffiti magazine
- Concrete Magazine, a publication of The Concrete Society

== Places in the United States ==
- Concrete, Colorado, an unincorporated community and former factory town
- Concrete, North Dakota, a community
- Concrete, DeWitt County, Texas, an unincorporated community
- Concrete, Guadalupe County, Texas, a former town
- Concrete, Washington, a town

== Other uses ==
- Concrete (Alserkal Avenue), a building in Dubai
- Concrete (perfumery), a product of solvent extraction from plants
- Concrete (philosophy), the opposite of abstract
- Concrete CMS, an open source content management system popularly called concrete
- Concrete, a style of milkshake
- Concrete category, in category theory

== See also ==
- Concrete art or concretism, an abstractionist movement
- Concrete poetry, a form of poetry
- Musique concrète, making music from unusual sounds including "real world" sounds
