= Nigel Harris (editor) =

English journalist

Nigel Harris (born March 1957) is an English journalist and media commentator. He was managing editor of RAIL, a UK rail industry magazine and then became co-presenter of the Green Signals podcast with Richard Bowker. He has been in the railway publishing industry since 1981 where he started as assistant editor of the publication Steam World. He has spoken on British television about accidents and other rail related matters. He has testified before the Transport Select Committee of the UK Parliament. In November 2024 he had a Class 66 locomotive named after him.

== Education and early career ==
Harris was born in March 1957 in Burnley, Lancashire and educated at Burnley Grammar School. He then attended and graduated from the University of Wales, Lampeter, in 1978 with Honours in History. He started his career in journalism at The Westmorland Gazette in 1979 as a trainee reporter. In 1981 he started as assistant editor of the publication Steam World. He has also edited Steam Railway and Trains Illustrated. He co-founded and managed a book publishing company, Silver Link, from 1984 to 1990 which has since been acquired.

== Journalistic and publishing career ==
Harris was appointed editor of Rail in 1995. The magazine is produced every two weeks by Bauer Consumer Media. Since 1995 he has written about the privatisation of British Rail and the impact of the privatisation of British Rail. He has written opinion and analysis for The Times, and provided specialist rail industry comment for, among others, the BBC's Today programme. He has published books on the topic of the rail industry. One major project has been editing and researching for A New Illustrated History of Her Majesty's Railway Inspectorate, by Ian Prosser and David Keay.

Harris has provided expert evidence to the Transport Select Committee of the UK Parliament. He was the principal witness at a televised select committee meeting on 26 May 2021 discussing the Williams-Shapps White Paper on Great British Railways formation. He has also given evidence to the Rail Accident Investigation Branch.

=== Conferences ===
Rail moved into the business events sector, launching the National Rail Awards, with categories including station of the year. Harris has planned and presented NRA presentation ceremonies at Grosvenor House in London's Park Lane. Later events have included the National Rail Conference, the RAIL 100 Breakfast Clubs, and the National Rail Recovery conference (February 2021). Speakers at the latter included Huw Merriman (chair of the Transport Select Committee), Jim McMahon (Shadow Transport Secretary) and Lord Peter Hendy CBE (chairman of Network Rail). The 2021 Awards were again held at Grosvenor House on 16 September 2021.

=== Television and radio appearances ===
Harris also has produced, scripted and presented programming for this rail industry market. His description of British Rail Class 46 locomotive number 46009 being destructively smashed into a nuclear flask to demonstrate safety was shown on national television.

His opinion was sought by the BBC after the Ufton Nervet rail crash in 2004. In January 2012, he was interviewed by the BBC for a mini-documentary news item "Inside the new-look London King's Cross railway station". The BBC also sought his opinion after the 2015 Wootton Bassett rail incident, a near-miss that later led to spot hire railway company West Coast Railways losing its operating permit. After the August 2020 Stonehaven derailment, he appeared on Sky News and Channel 4 News and others. Other media appearances include on ITV News at Ten and LBC. He also provided media comments after the Salisbury rail crash reporting. In 2020 he appeared in the top 10 of railway influencers.

He has written about HS2, and was described by the Yorkshire Post as a "top rail expert". When the Integrated Rail Plan for the North and Midlands was published in November 2021, he called it an act of political spinelessness, saying it created a new east-west divide in the country. He further accused the government of selling the public total lies. He had previously warned that the whole purpose of HS2 is destroyed if the eastern leg was scrapped. He called it hugely damaging for the public and raised concern about the blight on people's lives with the cancellation. When interviewed by The Independent he said the Leeds station upgrade being called part of the IRP by the government was not spin but dishonesty.

=== Voluntary work ===
Harris also works in a volunteer role for Great Central Railway Development Ltd, a company aiming to reinstate part of the old Great Central Railway, though he resigned as an officer in October 2019.

== See also ==
- Robert Adley
- Cecil J. Allen
- G. Freeman Allen
- Roger Ford
- O. S. Nock
- Jack Simmons (historian)
- Christian Wolmar
