= Railway Track & Structures =

- Editor: Mischa Wanek-Libman
- Categories: Trade journal
- Frequency: Monthly
- Publisher: Simmons-Boardman Publishing
- Founded: 1905
- Country: United States
- Based in: Bristol, Connecticut
- Language: English
- Website: www.rtands.com
- ISSN: 0033-9016
- OCLC: 317224687

Railway Track & Structures (RT&S) is an American trade journal for the rail transport industry, focusing on the fields of railroad engineering, communication and maintenance. It was founded in 1905 as Railway Engineering & Maintenance and is published monthly by Simmons-Boardman Publishing.

== See also ==
- List of railroad-related periodicals
