= Platform 5 =

British rail transport publisher

- Founded: 1977
- Founders: Peter Fox; Neil Webster
- Country of origin: England
- Headquarters location: Sheffield
- Publication types: Books, magazines
- Nonfiction topics: Rail transport
- Official website: www.platform5.com

Platform 5 is a publisher that specialises in rail transport books and magazines. The full name of the company is Platform 5 Publishing Limited. It was founded by Peter Fox and Neil Webster in 1977. It initially produced books with a target market of the rail enthusiast in the United Kingdom before diversifying into magazines and also Europe. Today's Railways (later Today's Railways Europe) was launched in 1994 and Entrain (later Today's Railways UK) in 2002. During the COVID-19 pandemic it temporarily suspended publication of its journals. It is based in Sheffield.

== External Websites ==
- Platform 5 publishing Ltd website
