= Narrow Gauge and Shortline Gazette =

- Editor: Bob Brown
- Categories: Narrow-gauge railways, Shortline railroads, Rail transport modeling
- Frequency: Bi-monthly
- Publisher: White River Productions
- Founded: 1975
- Country: USA
- Website: www.ngslgazette.com
- ISSN: 0148-2122

Narrow Gauge and Shortline Gazette, subtitled Accurate Information for Fine Modelbuilding, is a magazine published bimonthly (every two months) in the United States. It was published by Benchmark Publications, Ltd. of Mountain View, California, until the title was acquired by White River Productions in 2017. The editor and publisher is Robert W. Brown. As of 2007, the listed regular columnists include Gene Deimling, Mallory Hope Ferrell, Charlie Getz, Boone Morrison, Lane Stewart, and Jim Vail. The magazine is distributed to hobby shops by Kalmbach Publishing. The first issue of the magazine was March/April 1975, and the magazine has been published continuously since then.

The magazine specialises in, as the title says, narrow gauge and short-line railroads from both a prototype and modeling perspective. The vast majority of articles are on North American subjects, but the magazine regularly publishes articles with a more international perspective, especially on modeling matters.

On January 10, 2017, White River Productions announced their acquisition of the magazine title from Benchmark Publications. Bob Brown remains as editor.

== See also ==
- List of railroad-related periodicals
