= Hobby of Model Railroading =

Monthly magazine

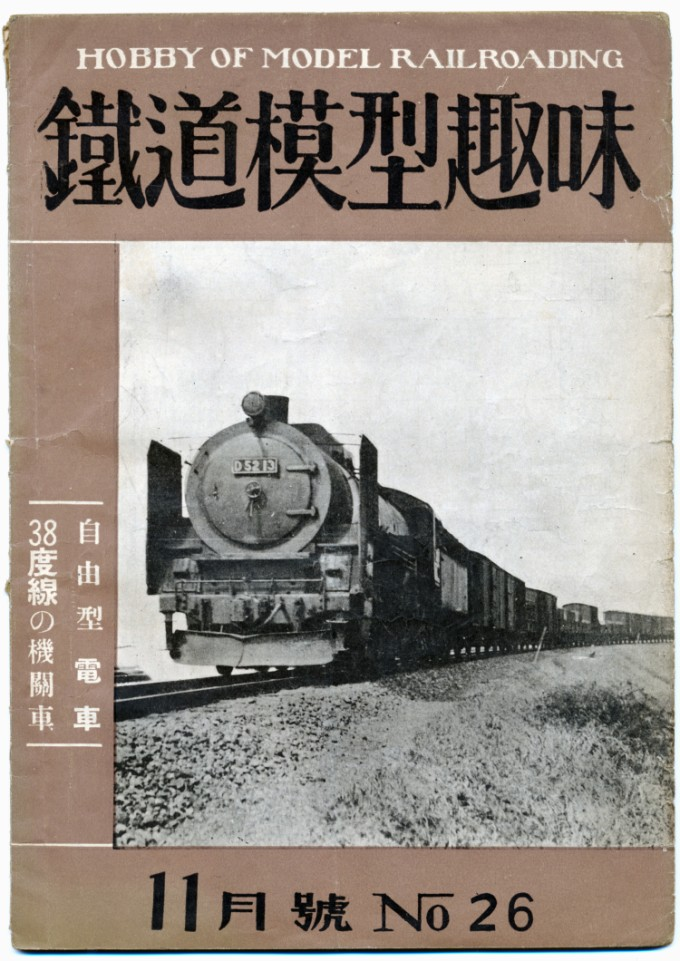
- An issue of Hobby of Model Railroading from November 1950 showing a Class D52 locomotive
- Editor: Noriyuki Natori
- Categories: Rail transport modeling
- Frequency: Monthly
- Publisher: Kigei Publishing
- Founded: 1947
- Country: Japan
- Based in: Tokyo
- Language: Japanese

Hobby of Model Railroading (Japanese: 鉄道模型趣味, romanized: Tetsudō Mokei Shumi, TMS) is a Japanese monthly magazine on railway modelling published by Kigei Publishing. It has been published in Japan since 1947.

== History ==
The magazine was first issued in 1947, produced by Haruo Ishibashi and Kiyo Yamazaki. Early editions were mimeographed, with no photographs, and hand-written diagrams. Following the death of Yamazaki, Ishibashi became editor-in-chief of the magazine and president of the publisher in 2003. The magazine celebrated its 800th issue in January 2014, although the magazine had actually been issued 860 times including special editions. In April 2019, Noriyuki Natori (former editor-in chief of "Rail Magazine") became editor in chief of this magazine, and Yoshihiro Imon became the president of the Kigei Publishing.

== Circulation ==
The magazine had a peak circulation of around 30,000 in the 1970s, but this had fallen to around 10,000 by 2014.

== See also ==
- Densha otaku
- List of railroad-related periodicals
