= Taut =

A taut object is one under tension.

Taut is also a surname, and may refer to:

- Bruno Taut (1880–1938), prolific German architect, urban planner and author
- Max Taut (1884–1967), German architect

Taut may also refer to:

- Tauț, a commune in Arad County, Romania
- Tăut, a village in Batăr Commune, Bihor County, Romania
- Taut International, sports drink company acquired by A.G. Barr

TAUT, an acronym, may refer to:

- Tramways and Urban Transit, a monthly magazine published in the UK
- The complement of the SAT-problem; testing if a formula is a tautology, known to be co-NP-complete.
