= Railways Africa =

2017 issue 6

Railways Africa ISSN 1029-2756 is a publication covering railways in Africa. It is published 6 times per year in print and weekly online.

== See also ==
- List of railroad-related periodicals
