= Lokaltrafikk =

Norwegian magazine

- Categories: Rail transportation
- Frequency: Quarterly
- Publisher: Lokaltrafikhistorisk forening
- First issue: 1986; 39 years ago
- Country: Norway
- Based in: Oslo
- Language: Norwegian
- ISSN: 0802-1007
- OCLC: 476260972

Lokaltrafikk is a quarterly magazine published by Lokaltrafikkhistorisk Forening and Sporveishistorisk Forening in Oslo, Norway.

== History and profile ==
Lokaltrafikk was founded in 1986. It is dominated by news and feature articles about domestic tram, rapid transit and light rail, but also has a news section and featured articles about international urban rail transport and domestic bus transport.

== See also ==
- List of railroad-related periodicals
