= Narrow Gauge Down Under =

Australian transportation magazine

Narrow Gauge Down Under is an Australian magazine that covers narrow-gauge prototype and model railways. The headquarters is in Clifton Hill, Victoria.

The magazine was first published in 1996, and is published 4 times per year.

== Parameters ==
- Coverage : Modelling & some International
- Size : A4
- Publisher : Gavin & Louise Hince
- ISSN 1834-5565
- Issue : Number 39 is October 2010

== See also ==
- List of railroad-related periodicals
