= Track & Signal =

Track & Signal is a railway-related periodical published in Australia. It covers the railway operations and equipment industries.

Track & Signal was established in October 1996 and the first issue was the January–March 1997 issue. The magazine is published by the Australasian Railway Association. The headquarters is in Melbourne. The last issue was published in December 2019, before production was temporarily suspended due to the COVID-19 pandemic. As at July 2022, production had yet to resume.

== See also ==
- List of railroad-related periodicals
