= Le Rail Maghreb =

Le Rail Maghreb was a rail transport related magazine covering the countries of North Africa and the Maghreb. It was published in French. It was the only specialist rail transport news publication covering Algeria, Morocco and Tunisia.

The magazine was published by Groupe Actis on a bimonthly basis with a readership of public and private rail sector professionals. The first issue appeared in November 2007. The magazine ended publication in June 2014.

== See also ==
- List of railroad-related periodicals
