= Model Rail =

British magazine

- Cover of the November 2024 issue
- Editor: Richard Foster
- Categories: British
- Frequency: Four-weekly
- Circulation: 28,337 (2009)
- First issue: 1997
- Company: Bauer
- Country: UK
- Language: English
- Website: Official website
- ISSN: 1369-5118

Model Rail is a British railway magazine focusing on rail transport modelling. It was first published in 1997, after running as a supplement to Rail.

Model Rail is published 13 times a year. It contains articles about railways in Britain, layouts, weathering, building kits, kitbashing, scratch building, and other model-making techniques.

== History ==
The original Model Rail ran as a supplement to Rail magazine. It became an individual magazine in Autumn 1997. The original Editor was Dave Lowery (who is now the Model Consultant).Originally published termly, it became bi-monthly, and then monthly. In March 2007, Model Rail began publishing 13 issues per year, including Spring and Christmas editions. Recently, editor Chris Leigh has stepped down, and Ben Jones took the role with Leigh becoming Consultant Editor.

== Layout of magazine ==
The 'Masterclass' for the first magazine was the Class 31, and which showed readers how to detail their Lima model. From magazine No. 114, MR had a new look, with more articles, "Show and Tell", and a gallery. The order of the regular features changed, with "Window Shopping" moving to the back, and Reviews moving to the front, next to "The Big Picture".

== See also ==
- List of railroad-related periodicals
