= Tall Timber Short Lines =

Railroad enthusiast magazine

Tall Timber Short Lines was a magazine dedicated to logging railroads and short line railroads, and was published by Oso Publications. The magazine was founded in 1993 with the title Plan Finder for its first 8 issues, before changing its title. It was read both by model railroaders and those interested in logging history and modeling. It was headquartered first in Tacoma, Washington, and then in Hamilton, Montana. The magazine ended publication in August 2008 after 90 issues.

== See also ==
- Railroad-related periodicals
