= Locomotion (periodical) =

Locomotion is a railway-related magazine published irregularly in Australia by the Australian Railway Historical Society, New South Wales Division. It is edited by the same team who produce Railway Digest.

== Aim ==
The editorial slant is towards locomotives, both steam and diesel.

== ISSN ==
- ISSN 1835-4890

== Issues ==
- Summer 2008 (January) was Issue 1. It concentrated on diesel locomotives
- Winter 2008 (August) was Issue 2. It concentrated on steam locomotives and included overseas preserved items.

== See also ==
- List of railroad-related periodicals
