= Steam World =

British railway magazine

Steam World is a UK-based railway magazine mainly covering the British Railways steam era (1945–1968). It is published monthly by Steam World Publishing.

== History and profile ==
Steam World was founded in 1981. The magazine ceased publication following its issue 23 in 1983. It was reestablished in 1990.

=== Parameters ===
- Size = A4
- Issue = No. 361 is July 2017

== ISSN ==
- ISSN 0959-0897

== See also ==
- List of railroad-related periodicals
