= Motive Power =

Australian railway magazine

Motive Power is a bi-monthly railway related magazine that focuses on diesel locomotives in Australia. The first issue was published on 23 August 1998. Its headquarters is in Sydney. The content includes photographs of locomotives & trains, news about newly delivered and repainted locomotives, technical articles, and fleet listings of the various Australian railway operators. Articles about railway photography itself are sometimes included, as well as articles and advertisements about railway modelling.

== Parameters ==
- Size : A4
- Issue : Number 111 is May/Jun 2017
- Issue : Number 143 is Jan/Feb 2023 Year 2022 Pictorial issue (84 pages)
- Issue : Number 154 is Jul/Aug 2024 Price $14.50
- Coverage : Australia & some modelling
- ISSN : 1442-7079
- Publisher : Motive Power Publications Pty. Ltd.

== See also ==
- List of railroad-related periodicals
