= Transfer table =

Railyard equipment to move rail vehicle to adjacent track

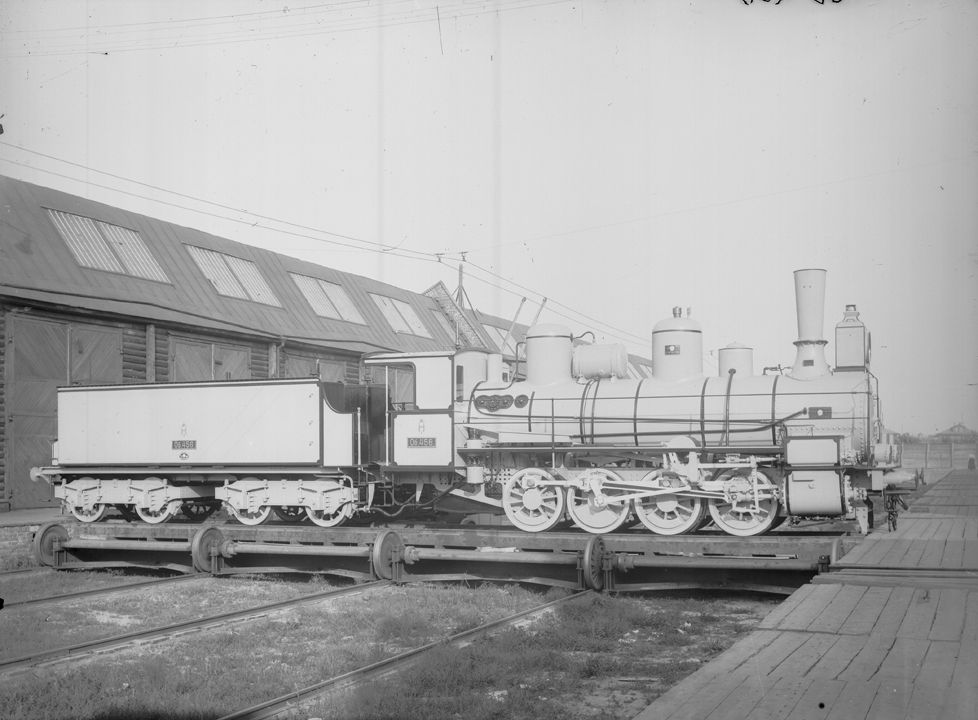
A steam locomotive on a traverser in Russia in 1910

A transfer table or traverser is a piece of railway equipment. It functions similarly to a turntable, although it cannot be used to turn vehicles around.

== Overview ==
A transfer table, also known as a traverser, consists of a single length of track that can be moved from side to side, in a direction perpendicular to the track. There are often multiple tracks on one side of the table and a single or multiple track(s) on the other.

== Applications ==
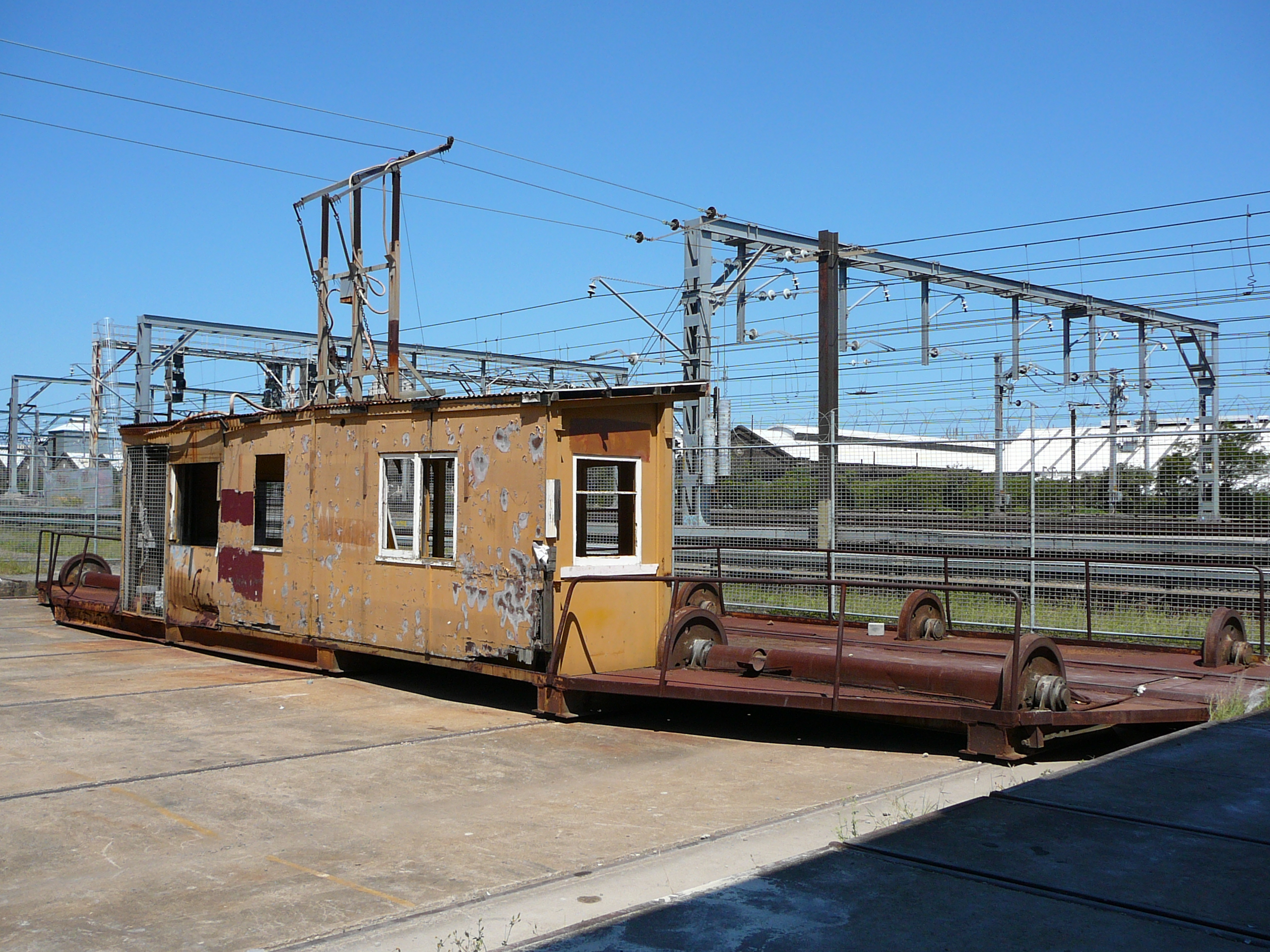
Disused traverser outside the former Eveleigh Carriage Workshops in Australia

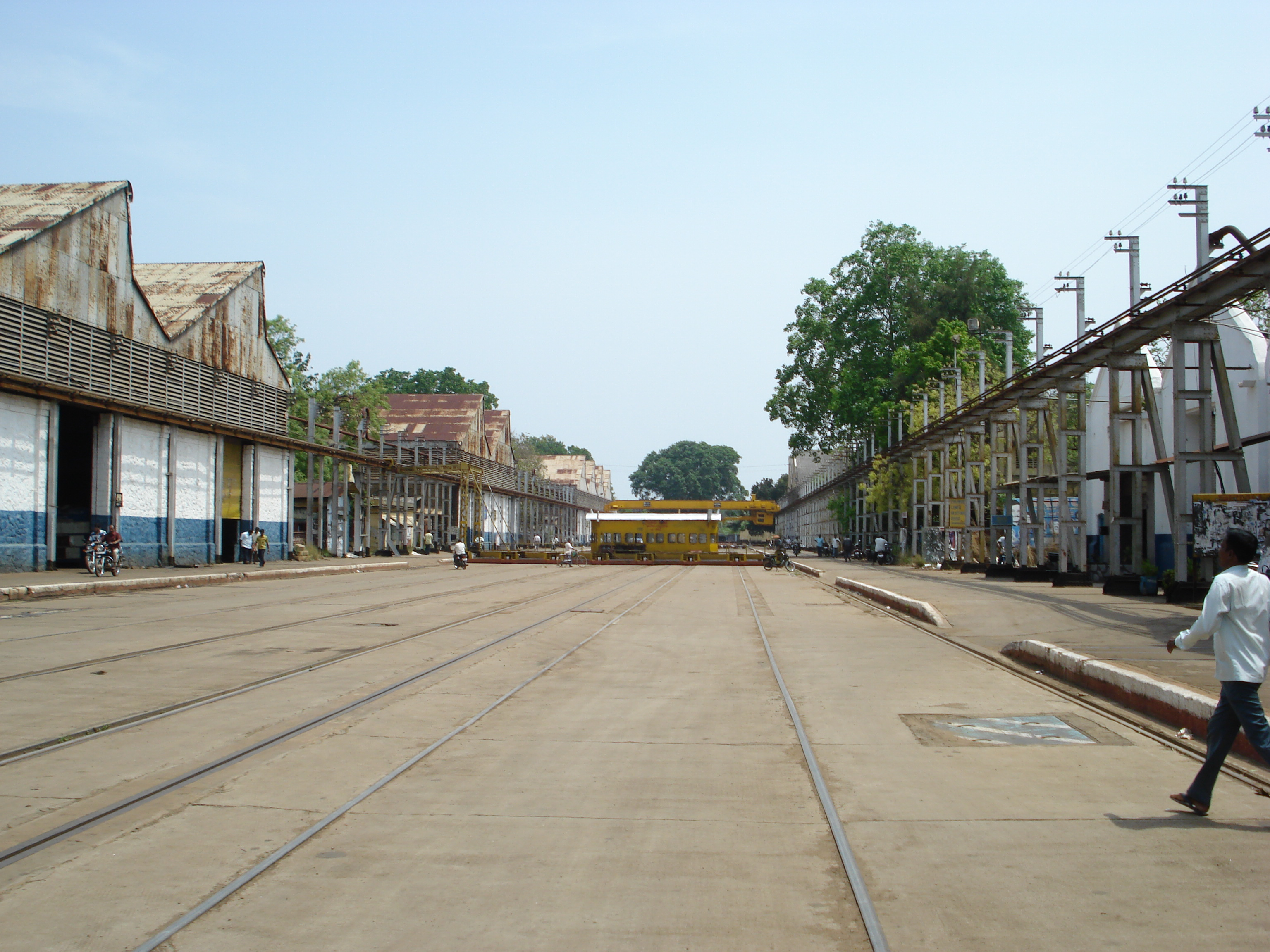
A traverser inside Golden Rock Railway Workshop in India.

=== Yards ===
They are often found in yards with locomotive maintenance facilities. The table allows a shed with multiple stalls for locomotives or carriages to be served by a single track, without the need for points that could take up a much larger area.

=== Terminal stations ===
In Europe, there were traversers at the terminal platforms at Birmingham Moor Street station, at Rossio railway station in Lisbon and at the former Gare de la Bastille terminus in Paris. These were installed to release locomotives from arriving passenger trains to the adjoining track. They had three parallel tracks on the table so that whichever positions the traverser was in an incoming passenger train would not be faced with a void.

Traversers were used at metropolitan termini located in confined sites, such as Kew and St Kilda in suburban Melbourne, Victoria, Australia, which worked only two tracks.

In 2013, the Port of Felixstowe installed a traverser across nine tracks at its new North Terminal as ordinary points could not be fitted while allowing 35-wagon trains of shipping containers.

=== Rack railways ===
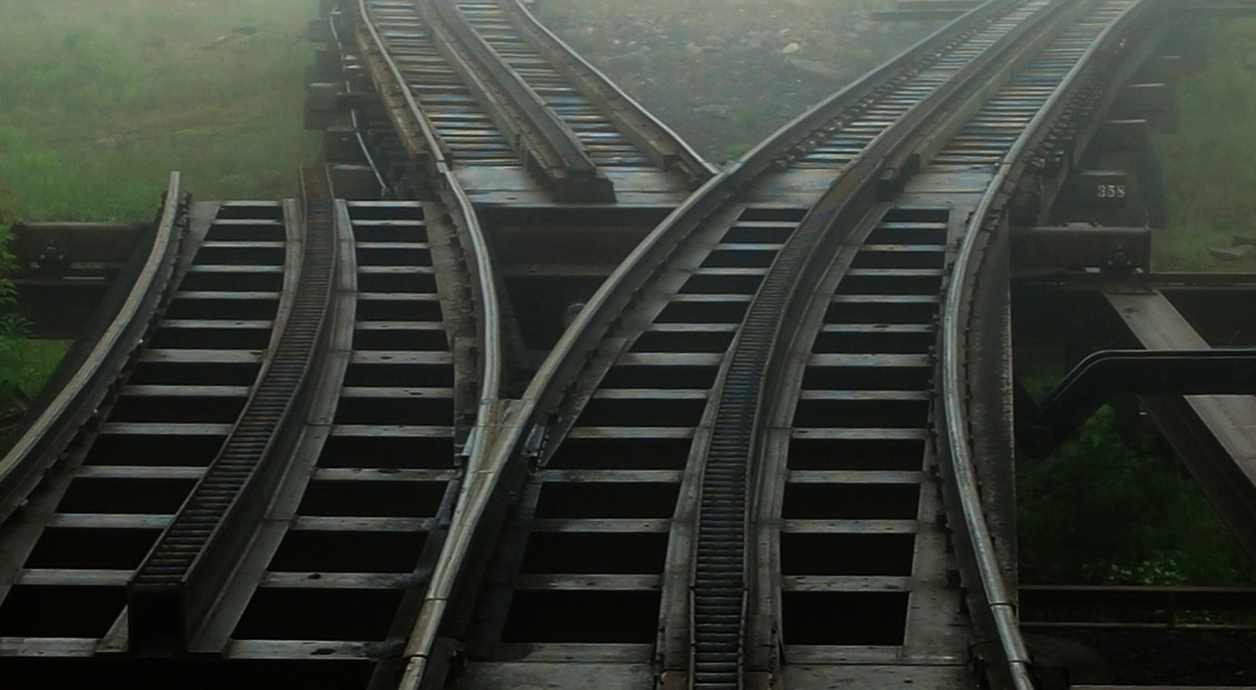
A two-track transfer table used as a switch at Mount Washington Cog Railway

Systems like the Locher rack system do not allow normal switches and transfer tables or rotary switches are used instead, as on the Pilatus Railway. A transfer table contains two tracks with different configurations. The table is moved sideways or rotated to choose the configuration that connects the track that the incoming train will be traveling from and to. Using transfer table as a switch or a rotary switch allows the center rack rail to be aligned for the cog wheels to continually drive the train forward while crossing the switch.

=== Roller coasters ===
Smaller traversers are frequently used on roller coasters to switch out trains.

=== Monorails and maglevs ===
Traversers are used on monorails and maglevs.

The Sydney Monorail had a traverser connected to about 6 storage roads. When the track in the main line moved to a stabling road, another track moved into the main line position.

=== Stadiums ===
Maintaining grass in stadiums can be a problem if the stadium keeps the grass in the shade. A solution is to mount the playing field on a single huge traverser, which can be rolled out under one of the grandstands onto the sunny side of that grandstand.

== Combined turntable and traverser ==
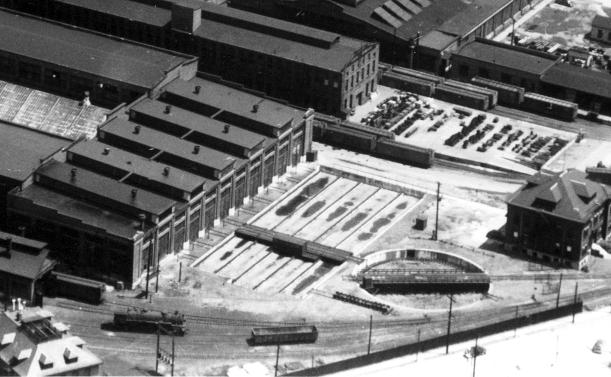
Collinwood yards usage of a turntable leading into a transfer table

In rare instances, the turning features of a turntable have been combined with the lateral motion of a transfer table. Examples of such installations are in Asia and Europe.

An example of both pieces of equipment was in use up until the 1970s at the Collinwood Yards in Cleveland, Ohio. It allowed a single turntable to serve a linear train shed.

== Preserved examples ==
Didcot Railway Centre, UK, has a traverser for transferring coaching stock between the roads of the carriage maintenance sheds.

The National Tramway Museum at Crich, in Derbyshire, England has a traverser between the depot roads.

Pilatus Railway has a lot of traversers, as its rack railway system does not allow switches.

Sydney Tramway Museum, Sydney, Australia has a traverser between depot roads 4 to 8 and to allow access to their workshop facilities (roads 9 and 10).

Transfer tables are extensively used in the Mechelen workshops of the Belgian Railways NMBS/SNCB.

Traversers are common on ridable miniature railways to access the shed and maintenance facilities. There may be a desire to reduce the number of points required, or — in the case of raised track with overhanging carriages — to allow switching with the same restrictions found on a saddle-beam monorail.

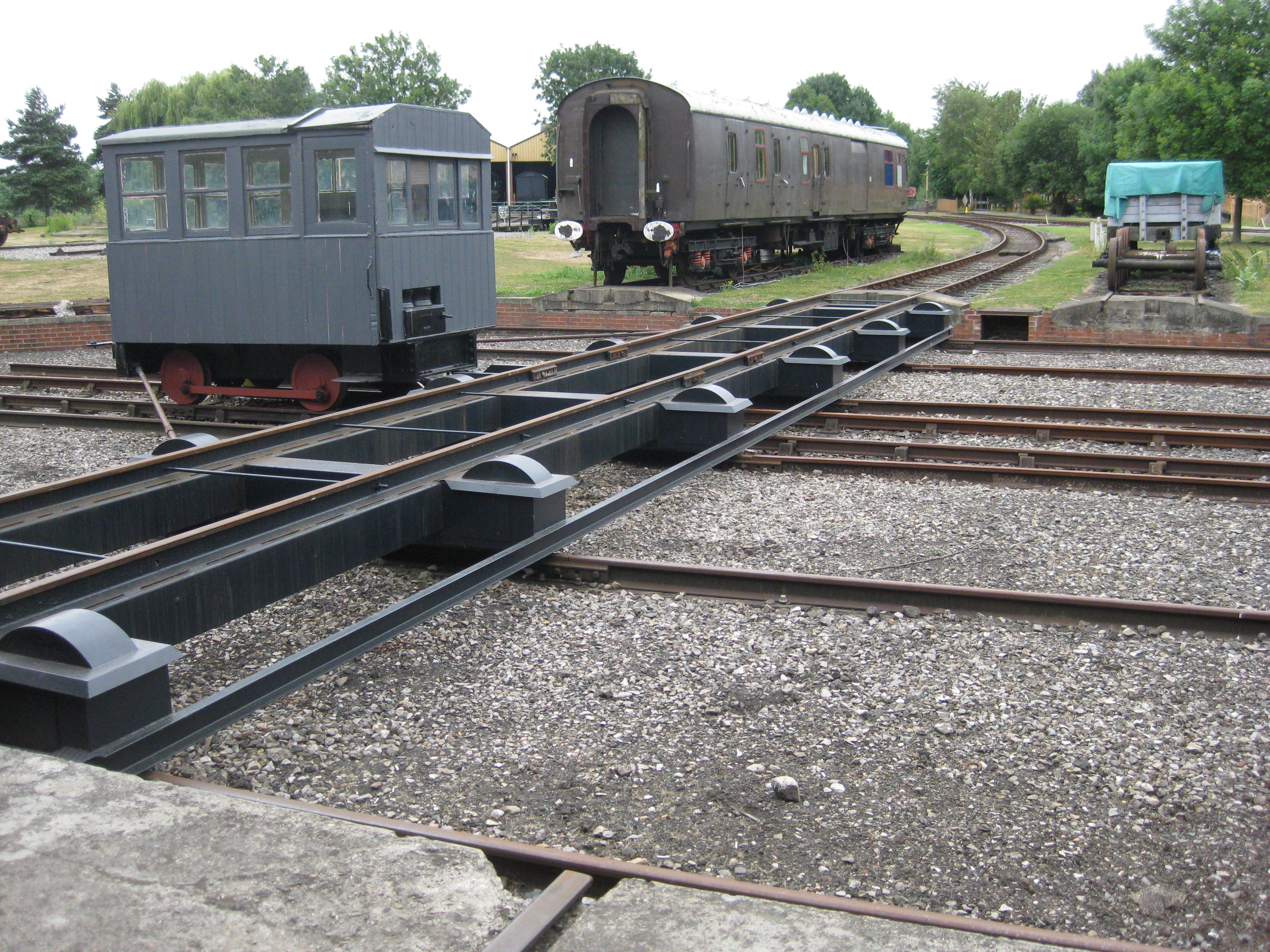
Transfer table at Didcot Railway Centre.

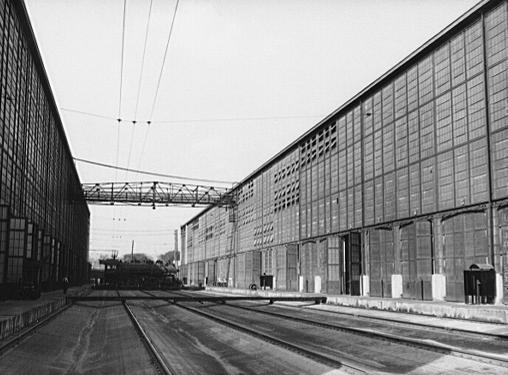
Steam locomotive on the transfer table between buildings in Santa Fe's San Bernardino, California shops in March 1943

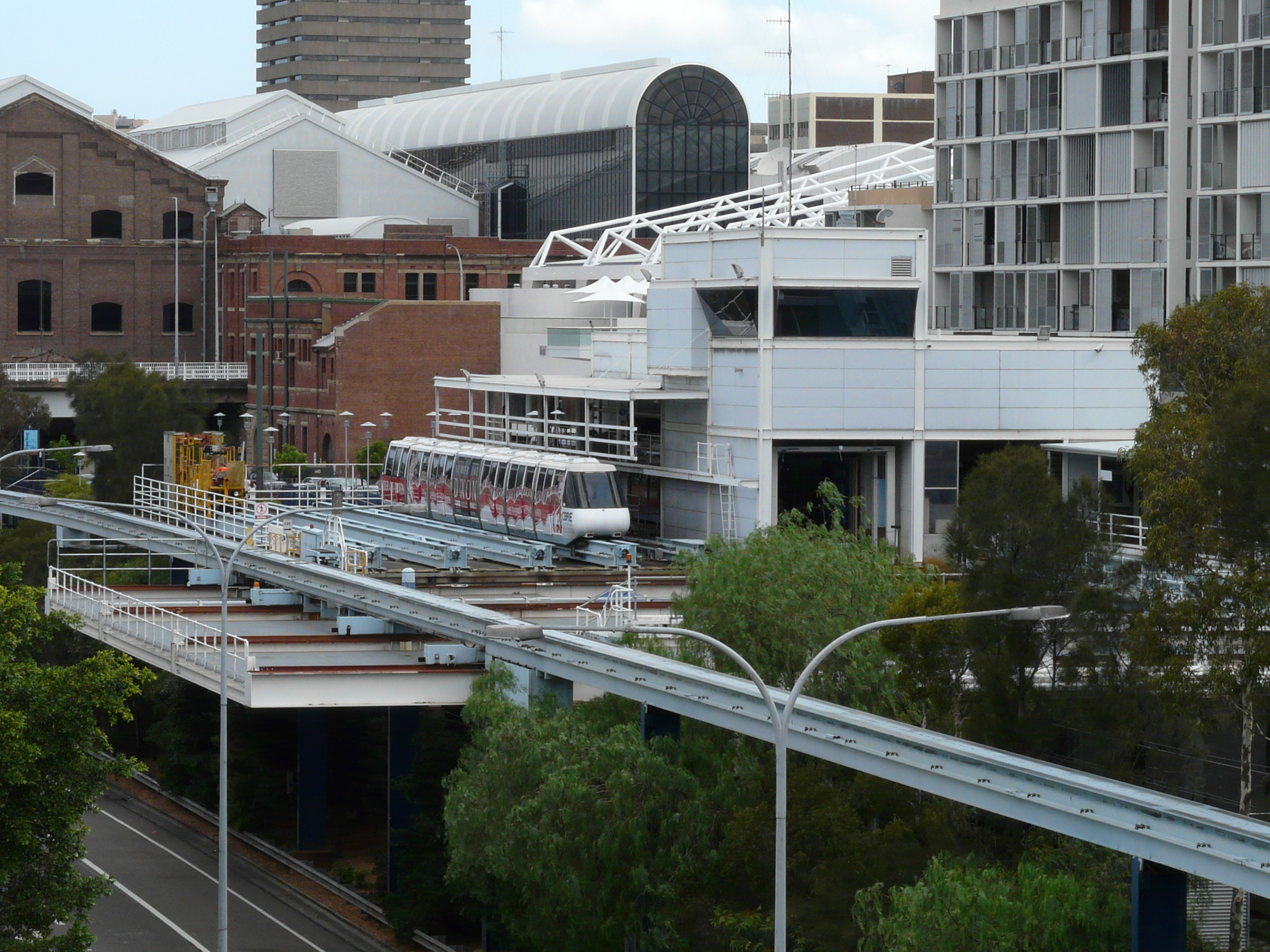
Former Sydney Monorail depot with its traverser at the front

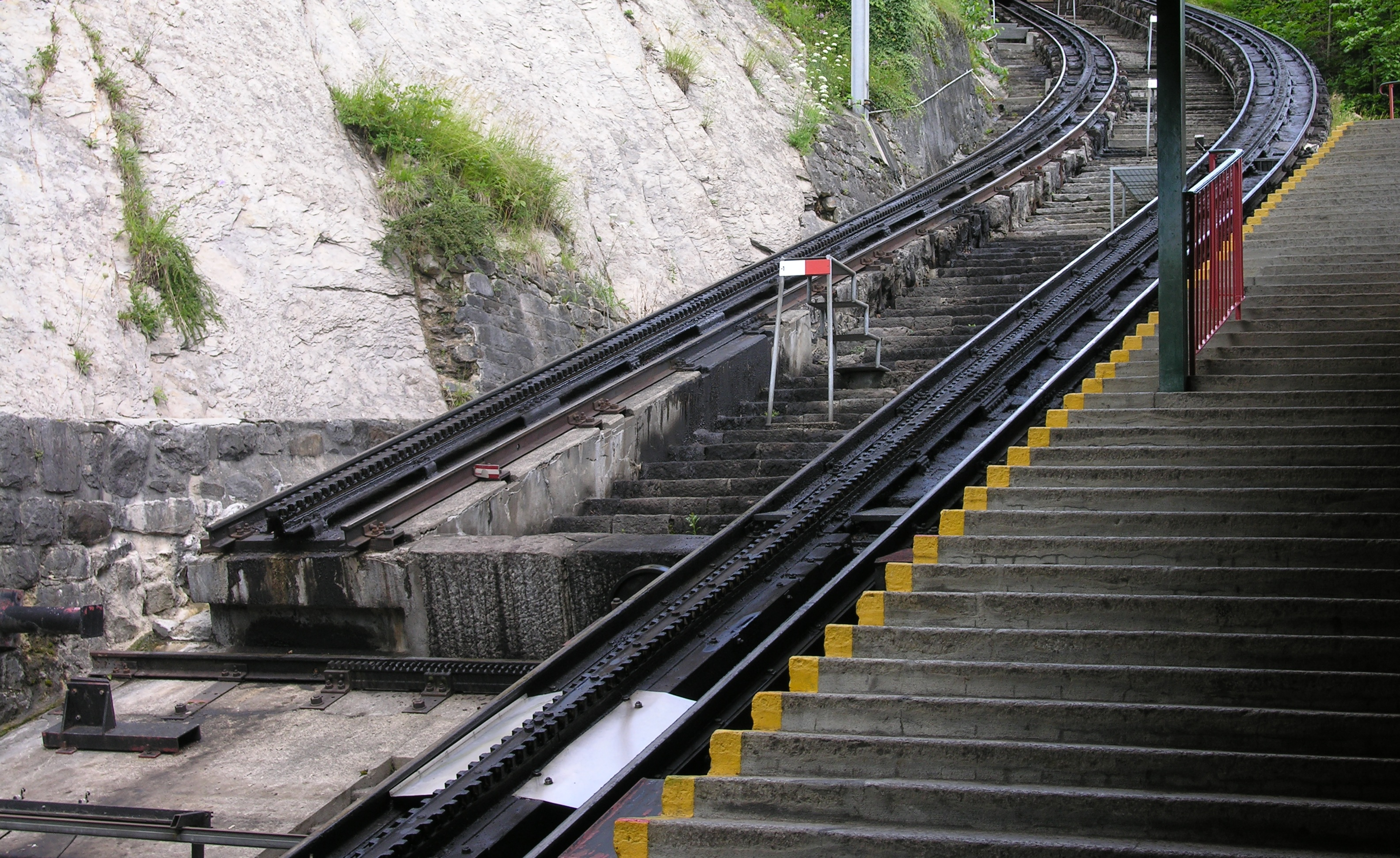
The two row transfer table in Pilatus Railway, one edge also serving as a passenger platform
