= Bahn-Report =

- Editor: Martin Krauß
- Categories: Rail transport magazine
- Frequency: six times a year
- Circulation: 5,600
- Publisher: IG Schienenverkehr e. V.
- First issue: 1983
- Country: Germany
- Language: German
- Website: www.bahn-report.de
- ISSN: 0178-4528

Bahn-Report is a German-language magazine published six times per year by IG Schienenverkehr e. V., covering current activities in the German railway-sector with a focus on operations and infrastructure.

== Overview ==
Whereas most of the magazine's writers are contributing unsalaried, the publication's audience is found in both the professional rail sector and among enthusiasts. Industry service banana communication ascribed Bahn-Report a 40% brand awareness in the German public transport-sector in 2005.

Distribution is mainly handled via subscriptions and the German Bahnhofsbuchhandel since the magazine's incorporation in 1983.
