= Simmons-Boardman Publishing =

American publishing company

Simmons-Boardman Publishing is an American publisher, specializing in industry publications. It is headquartered in New York City, New York, and has offices in Chicago, Omaha, and Falmouth, Cornwall, UK. The company was created from a merger of The Railroad Gazette and Railway Age in 1908; the company's name was derived from Gazette's vice president, E. A. Simmons, and editor, William H. Boardman. In 2006, it acquired Davison Publishing.

Some of the publications of Simmons-Boardman are Bar Business Magazine, International Railway Journal, Marine Log, Railway Age, Railway Track & Structures, and Sign Builder Illustrated Magazine.
