= International Railway Journal =

Global trade magazine

- Editor: Kevin Smith
- Categories: Rail transport
- Frequency: Monthly
- Circulation: 10,234 (2020)
- Publisher: Simmons-Boardman Publishing
- Founder: Robert Lewis; Luther Miller
- First issue: October 1960
- Country: England
- Based in: Falmouth
- Language: English
- Website: railjournal.com
- ISSN: 0744-5326

The International Railway Journal (IRJ) is a monthly international trade magazine published by Simmons-Boardman Publishing in Falmouth, England.

== History ==
Founded by Robert Lewis and Railway Age editor Luther Miller as the world's first globally distributed magazine for the railway industry, the first edition of IRJ was published as a pilot in October 1960. Monthly production commenced in January 1961.

== Content ==
The magazine covers a range of rail-related content, covering sectors including passenger, freight, high-speed, metro and light rail. Regular subject matters include financial news, fleet orders, infrastructure, new technologies and government policy.

== Circulation and distribution ==
IRJ publishes regular content on its website, and also publishes a monthly print edition, distributed through controlled circulation. IRJ's print edition had a circulation of 10,234 copies in 2020, according to the Audit Bureau of Circulations (UK).
