= Light Rail Transit Association =

Non-profit transport organisation

The Light Rail Transit Association (LRTA), formerly the Light Railway Transport League (LRTL), is a non-profit organisation whose purpose is to advocate and encourage research into the retention and development of light rail and tramway/streetcar systems. The LRTA publishes the monthly magazine Tramways & Urban Transit (formerly Modern Tramway), and is based in the United Kingdom but with an international membership and remit.

== History ==
The Light Railway Transport League was formed in 1937, and renamed to the LRTA in 1979. It was formed at a time when Britain's urban tramways were starting to decline.

Because of the decline, the association campaigned for modern light rail in the UK, as typified by some "Stadtbahn" systems in Germany. The openings of the Tyne and Wear Metro in 1980, Manchester Metrolink in 1991 and new tram systems in Sheffield, Birmingham, Croydon and Nottingham are very much in line with the aims of the LRTA.

== See also ==
- National Tramway Museum
- Scottish Tramway and Transport Society
- Campaign for Better Transport
