= Concrete (magazine) =

Polish graffiti magazine

- Categories: Graffiti; Railways
- Frequency: Annual
- Format: A4
- Publisher: Concrete
- Paid circulation: 1000-1500
- First issue: 2005
- Country: Poland
- Based in: Gdańsk
- Language: English / Polish
- Website: concretemagazine.org
- ISSN: 1895-1481
- OCLC: 839222045

Concrete is a long-running publication from Poland, which focuses on train graffiti from Central and Eastern Europe.

== Magazine scope ==
The majority of content in Concrete consists of graffiti on rolling stock in the regions of Central and Eastern Europe, with the magazine's subtitle, 'East Europe Graffiti Magazine', reflecting this scope.

== Publication history ==
The first issue of Concrete was released in 2005. In this period, other graffiti magazines in Poland had ceased publication and there was a gap in the market for a new magazine that extended its geographical scope across the wider region to cover burgeoning scenes in Belarus, Russia, and Ukraine.

=== Stance on Russo-Ukrainian War ===
Due to its geographical scope, Concrete has espoused a pro-Ukrainian editorial line in relation to the Russo-Ukrainian War. This has meant that, while the magazine does continue to publish submissions from Russian graffiti artists, as of 2024 it no longer publishes the works of those who openly support the special military operation.
