= Today's Railways Europe =

English rail transport magazine

- Cover of Today's Railways Europe №303, featuring an image of a PKP class EP07
- Editor: Keith Barrow
- Former editors: David Haydock
- Categories: Rail transport
- Frequency: Monthly
- Publisher: Platform 5
- Founder: Platform 5
- First issue: July 1994
- Country: England
- Based in: Sheffield
- Language: English
- Website: platform5.com
- ISSN: 1354-2753

Today's Railways Europe is an English-based monthly magazine covering rail transport in Europe. It was founded by Platform 5 in July 1994. Initially published bimonthly, from August 1997 it was published monthly. It also covered rail transport in Great Britain, and was named simply Today's Railways, until a sister publication Entrain (later Today's Railways UK) was launched in 2002, and from then on Today's Railways Europe concentrated on rail transport in Continental Europe. Production of the magazine as of 3 April 2020 was suspended due to the coronavirus (COVID-19) outbreak. Production resumed with the July 2020 issue.

The magazine was edited by Peter Fox until his death in 2011. Fox wrote the monthly "Grumpy Old Man" column. The present editor is Keith Barrow.
