= Today's Railways UK =

English rail transport magazine

- Editor: Robert Pritchard
- Former editors: Peter Fox; Paul Abell; Jonathan Webb
- Staff writers: Alan Yearsley; Ian Beardsley
- Categories: Rail transport
- Frequency: Monthly
- Publisher: Platform 5
- Founder: Platform 5
- First issue: January 2002
- Country: England
- Based in: Sheffield
- Language: English
- Website: www.platform5.com
- ISSN: 1475-9713

Today's Railways UK is an English-based monthly magazine covering rail transport in Great Britain. It was founded by Platform 5 in January 2002 as Entrain as a sister publication to Today's Railways Europe, in January 2006 it was rebranded as Today's Railways UK.

The magazine was set up by Peter Fox, who wrote a monthly "Grumpy Old Man" Column. It is owned by Platform 5 publications. Fox was editor-in-chief of the magazine until his death in 2011.

Robin Sisson, the rail campaigner, worked for Today's Railways UK as assistant editor, under editor-in-chief Peter Fox, from 2006 until his death in 2008. Sisson wrote the monthly "Just the Ticket" feature.

Production of the magazine was suspended in April 2020 due to the COVID-19 pandemic; it resumed with the July 2020 issue.
