= Tramways & Urban Transit =

British monthly magazine

- Editor: Matt Johnston (2023–present)
- Former editors: W. J. Wyse (1967–1995), Howard Johnston (1995–2010), Simon Johnston (2011–2023), et al.
- Categories: Urban rail transit – primarily trams and light rail
- Frequency: Monthly
- Publisher: 1938–62: Light Railway Transport League; 1962–2007: Jointly, LRTL/LRTA and Ian Allan Publishing; 2007–17: LRTA Publishing Ltd; 2018 to date: Mainspring Enterprises Ltd
- First issue: January 1938 (under the name Modern Tramway or similar until 1998)
- Country: Worldwide coverage
- Based in: United Kingdom
- Website: www.lrta.org/tramways-and-urban-transit/
- ISSN: 1460-8324

Tramways & Urban Transit (TAUT or T&UT), also known as Modern Tramway, is a British monthly magazine about tramways and light rail transport, published continuously since 1938. Its content is orientated both to tramway enthusiasts and to persons working in the tram transport field or studying tramways. It has been issued monthly from the beginning. Although published in Britain, the magazine's coverage is international, and its regular "World News" column includes detailed news on electric trams (called streetcars or trolleys in American English) and light rail worldwide.

From 1938 until 2007 the magazine was published by the Light Railway Transport League or, after a change of name in 1979, the Light Rail Transit Association (LRTA), but starting in 1962 publication was jointly by that body and Ian Allan Limited, which partnership allowed the magazine to be carried at bookshops and other trade outlets. With effect from the July 2007 issue, publication was taken over by a newly formed company, LRTA Publishing Ltd (LRTAP), who also publish a quarterly historical magazine, Tramway Review, for the LRTA. Circulation is around 9,000, worldwide.

The editors of the annual reference book, Jane’s Urban Transport Systems (JUTS), have used TAUT or its predecessor, Modern Tramway, as the principal data source for keeping up-to-date JUTS’ annotated worldwide list of all "Urban Tram and Light Rail Systems", and have done so for more than 25 years. The magazine has also been an important source of news and information on European tram developments for transport writers in the United States.

== Title changes ==
Originally titled The Modern Tramway, the magazine's first issue was published in January 1938. The title retained the words "Modern Tramway" for the next 60 years, but with variations. From 1962 the word "The" was dropped, and a title extension—in smaller letters and not used in abbreviations of the magazine's name—was added, changing slightly a few times over the next 30 years, as shown below.

- Modern Tramway and Light Railway Review, January 1962–December 1973
- Modern Tramway and Rapid Transit Review, January 1974–December 1976
- Modern Tramway and Light Rapid Transit (ISSN 0309-8222), January 1977–March 1980
- Modern Tramway and Light Rail Transit (ISSN 0144-1655), April 1980–December 1991

The last variation survived for nearly 12 years, but a more substantial name change was made in January 1992, when Modern Tramway and Light Rail Transit became Light Rail and Modern Tramway (LR&MT) (ISSN 0964-9255). This in turn was replaced by the magazine's current title, Tramways & Urban Transit (ISSN 1460-8324), in January 1998. This was abbreviated as "T&UT" until mid-2007 and thereafter as "TAUT".

== Description ==
While content has varied over the years, each issue typically includes two to four feature articles, describing a particular tram or light rail system, manufacturer or related topic; news sections for international, UK and museum or heritage tram news; editorial content, and a letters section. Some issues also include reviews, of books, DVDs, etc. Feature articles usually include maps. Since 1995, each issue has had 40 pages, counting the front and back covers. Although histories of existing tram systems are sometimes included, coverage of long-closed systems was moved out of Modern Tramway in 1950 with the launch of a second LRTA magazine, Tramway Review, which continues in publication today and is focused on histories of tram systems in Britain.

TAUT's current editor-in-chief is Matt Johnston, who was named to the post in April 2023 following the death of the previous editor and his brother, Simon Johnston. The editor with the longest tenure was W. J. Wyse, who was the magazine's editor for 28 years, from June 1967 to April 1995, a longer period than any other MT or TAUT editor to date. Other editors-in-chief who held the post for more than five years were K. G. Mansell (July 1952–April 1960), James Joyce (May 1960–June 1967), Howard Johnston (1996–2011), and Simon Johnston (2011–2023).

=== Format changes ===
The January 1990 issue brought a small increase in Modern Tramway's page size, from 8 1/4 in x 5 1/2 in to ISO size A5, and the first regular inclusion of colour photographs—on the front and back covers and a two-page centre spread in each issue. Most illustrations remained black-and-white. With effect from the January 1992 issue, concurrent with the change of name to Light Rail & Modern Tramway, the magazine's page size was doubled, to A4 size. The number of pages per issue was reduced from 40 to 32 at that time, but the two changes in combination yielded a net increase of 60% in page area. The number of pages was restored to 40 from the April 1995 issue (and has remained 40 ever since). The use of colour illustrations was later expanded, as colour printing became less expensive, and since May 2002 TAUT has been fully in colour.

== See also ==
- List of railway-related periodicals
- List of modern tramway and light rail systems in the United Kingdom
- List of town tramway systems in the United Kingdom
