= Rail (magazine) =

British railway magazine

- Cover of an issue from July 2024
- Editor: Dickon Ross
- Former editors: Nigel Harris
- Staff writers: Christian Wolmar
- Categories: Rail transport
- Frequency: Fortnightly
- Circulation: ▲20,063 (January–December 2015)
- Publisher: Bauer Consumer Media
- Founded: Emap
- First issue: 1981
- Country: England
- Based in: Peterborough
- Website: www.railmagazine.com
- ISSN: 0953-4563

Rail is a British magazine on the subject of current rail transport in Great Britain. It is published fortnightly by Bauer Consumer Media.

It was launched as Rail Enthusiast in 1981 initially as a bi-monthly publication, becoming monthly in April 1982 and fortnightly in March 1989. It was renamed Rail in January 1988.

Nigel Harris was the editor for 28 years, from 1995 until September 2023. Dickon Ross took over as editor in 2024. He was later joined on the staff by industry editor Richard Wilcock, news editor Dave Stubbings and features editor Andy Comfort.
