= Railroads Illustrated =

- Editor: Steve Jessup
- Categories: rail transport photography
- Frequency: Annual
- Publisher: White River Productions
- Founded: 2007 (1970)
- Final issue: 2014
- Country: USA
- Based in: Bucklin, Missouri
- Language: English
- Website: railroadsillustrated.com
- ISSN: 1071-8311

Railroads Illustrated, formerly known as CTC Board, was a monthly magazine, published by White River Productions (WRP), devoted to railroad photography. WRP purchased CTC Board magazine from Hundman Publishing after the May 2006 issue, and rebranded the magazine as Railroads Illustrated, and used the CTC Board name for the news section. December 2014 marked the final monthly issue, with future expanded editions to be released annually. The news section and some feature content now appears in an expanded Railfan & Railroad, which was acquired by WRP in 2014.

== CTC Board (1970-2006) ==
Railroads Illustrated was originally published as CTC Board (ISSN 0164-8373), a monthly magazine devoted to railroad photography, rail industry and tourist railroad news, and historical articles, from 1970 to 2006. The magazine's name referred to the centralized traffic control displays used by train dispatchers to control rail traffic across a given territory. The magazine's well-known cover logo was an Alaska Railroad F-unit.

January 1995 issue

It originally was a mimeographed leaflet by Dean Lewis of Castro Valley, California, and later was published by David Styffe in Southern California; HyRail Productions of Denver, Colorado; then Hundman Publishing, of Edmonds, Washington. The editor until the July 2005 issue was Dale Sanders. From August 2005 until the final issue, the magazine was edited by author Paul D. Schneider. Mark W. Hemphill (later editor of Trains magazine), then rail photographer Brian Rutherford, were production editors for many years.

While the magazine's focus was on railroad photography, it included current news for railfans, as well as articles from railroad professionals such as Jack Wheelihan of General Motors' Electro-Motive Division, and Bob Eisthen, a private investment analyst. Among CTC Board's notable works was a series devoted to the last logging railroads in North America, the race for high-horsepower locomotives in the U.S. during the 1960s, photo essays showcasing the work of U.S. railroad photographers, and a retrospective on the end of the Milwaukee Road's Pacific Coast Extension. In addition, the magazine explored thematic issues, such as "Storm Light," (photographs taken under stormy weather conditions), "Black and White Forever" (showcasing contemporary black-and-white photography), and photographs taken on a single day, entitled a "Day in North America."

Final monthly edition, December 2014

== Railroads Illustrated (2007-2014) ==
CTC Board ended production in 2006, with the June issue (No. 332) becoming the final issue using that name. With owner/publisher Bob Hundman seeking retirement, the magazine was sold to White River Productions (WRP), publisher of Passenger Train Journal and other magazines. WRP renamed the magazine Railroads Illustrated (ISSN 1071-8311), the CTC Board name being retained for the news section. WRP's production began with No. 333, published in February 2007, with Cinthia Priest as editor.

== Railroads Illustrated Annual (2014-present) ==
When WRP acquired Railfan & Railroad magazine in 2014, it was decided to end monthly production of Railroads Illustrated. Future editions of Railroads Illustrated would be released on an annual special edition schedule. Monthly subscribers would receive Railfan & Railroad beginning with the January 2015 issue. When White River Productions acquired Railfan & Railroad magazine in September 2014, it was decided to transfer the best features of Railroads Illustrated to the new expanded monthly format including the news columns and the closing Parting Shot image on the final page. The last monthly edition was published in December 2014, and the publication was converted into an annual. The new 100-page Railroads Illustrated Annual publication focuses on creative railroad photography, featuring subjects both current and historical. All content is sourced from outside contributors who are regular readers of the publication.

In 2019, Steve Jessup succeeded Cinthia Priest as editor of Railroads Illustrated Annual.

== See also ==
- Railroad-related periodicals
