= Mac Sebree =

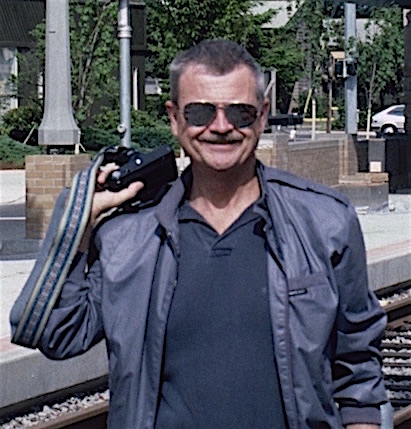
- Sebree in 1986
- Born: George McClelland Sebree III; August 26, 1932; Omaha, Nebraska, U.S.
- Died: March 7, 2010 (aged 77); Vancouver, Washington, U.S.
- Resting place: Fayette City Cemetery, Fayette, Missouri
- Other name: G. Mac Sebree
- Occupations: Journalist, editor, publisher; owner of Interurban Press

George McClelland Sebree III (August 26, 1932 – March 7, 2010), better known as Mac Sebree, was an American journalist, writer and publisher whose area of expertise was urban mass transit, particularly urban rail transit. He was also a businessman, being owner and president of the publishing company, Interurban Press, from 1975 until 1993. In addition to writing and publishing historical material, he also followed – and regularly reported on – contemporary developments concerning rail transit, and by the 1990s he had become an expert on light rail in North America.

== Early life and education ==
G. M. Sebree adopted the nickname "Mac" at an early age and went by the name Mac Sebree, both personally and professionally, for most of his life, only modifying this slightly in 1995, to G. Mac Sebree. Growing up in Omaha, Nebraska, he later lived in Albuquerque, New Mexico, and attended the University of New Mexico. He was editor of the university's student newspaper (at the time named the New Mexico Lobo) from June to September 1954, and graduated from the university in 1956 with a bachelor of arts degree.

== First career ==
He worked as a newspaperman from 1955 until 1982, including 20 years covering transportation for United Press International (UPI) and the Scripps newspapers, the UPI stint lasting 11 years. He was employed as a reporter for two Albuquerque newspapers, the Albuquerque Journal and The Albuquerque Tribune, and for the Avalanche-Journal, of Lubbock, Texas. He began working for the Avalanche-Journal in August 1955.

In 1956, he was hired by United Press to manage its Jefferson City, Missouri, news bureau. In November 1957, he was transferred to Tulsa, Oklahoma, to manage UP's bureau in that city. (United Press became United Press International the following year.) In 1961, at age 28, Sebree was appointed as UPI's manager for the state of Oklahoma. He later held an executive position at UPI's Houston, Texas office, moving in 1966 to its Dallas office. For several years he additionally worked as a salesman for a syndicated service providing illustrations for newspaper advertisements, the Stamps-Conhaim Creative Newspaper Advertising Service. He moved to Southern California in the late 1960s.

== Transit writing and publishing ==
In 1975, Sebree inherited from his friend Ira Swett a small publishing company named Interurbans, which published books about streetcars and interurban electric railways. A longtime railfan, particularly of streetcars and trolleybuses, Sebree had already done some writing and editing for Interurbans, including co-authoring the books, Transit's Stepchild: The Trolley Coach (LCCN 73-84356) and The Trolley Coach in North America (LCCN 74-20367), in 1973 and 1974, respectively. Sebree renamed the business "Interurban Press" and, after adding a partner, Jim Walker (as vice president), expanded the company's output.

Under Mac Sebree's ownership, Interurban acquired the monthly railfan-oriented magazines, Pacific RailNews (PRN) and Passenger Train Journal, and the bimonthly Private Varnish. In the case of PRN, Sebree was the magazine's publisher, and he also compiled a regular column of urban rail transit news, which was published in each issue from the mid-1980s until 1993, when PRN was sold. He followed with great interest the revival in the 1980s of streetcars as a significant public transit mode in North America, modernized as "light rail", telling a Los Angeles Times reporter in a 1983 interview, "The United States let a tremendous national asset go to waste when it junked its trolley systems, but the further the trolleys fade into the past, the larger the number of people who would like to have them back." Indeed, several cities did bring back rail transit, mostly in the form of light rail, in the 1980s and 1990s, and Sebree documented these developments as editor of three editions of the North American Light Rail Annual and User's Guide (in 1992–94, published by Interurban Press/Pentrex).

Although he authored few books himself, Sebree edited several books written by others, including When Oklahoma Took the Trolley (1980) and The Railroad Artistry of Howard Fogg (1999).

In 1993, Sebree retired from full-time work, sold Interurban Press to Pentrex and moved from southern California to Vancouver, Washington. From his Vancouver home, he worked part-time as a transit consultant. He also took on the job of editor of Motor Coach Age, the quarterly magazine of the Motor Bus Society, and held that position from January 1995 until fall 2003.

He was the "International Editor" (one of the contributing editors) for the quarterly New Electric Railway Journal from fall 1996 until the cessation of publication of that magazine, in late 1998. His contributions to TNERJ also included articles on New Orleans' plans to expand its heritage streetcar system, as well as on light rail and streetcars in Australia, Salt Lake City and Seattle.

In 2001, G. Mac Sebree introduced a new, monthly news column on rail transit in Trains magazine, entitled "City Rail", to report developments related to light rail, streetcars, rapid transit and commuter rail in North America, and he was the column's author/editor until 2003.

== Philanthropy ==
In 2005, Sebree donated $20,000 to the Railway & Locomotive Historical Society (based in Sacramento, California), to establish a trust fund to provide permanent support for publication of the organization's longtime journal, Railroad History. In 2008 Sebree donated $10,000, and pledged $90,000 more, to the Orange Empire Railway Museum to support the construction of a permanent library and archive building.

== Death ==
Mac Sebree died on March 7, 2010, at his home in Vancouver, Washington.
