= Model Railroad News =

American rail transport modeling magazine

- Editor: Tony Cook
- Categories: Rail transport modeling
- Frequency: Monthly
- Publisher: White River Productions
- First issue: 1995
- Country: USA
- Website: modelrailroadnews.com
- ISSN: 1533-4244

Model Railroad News is an American magazine specializing in the hobby of model railroading. The editor is Tony Cook, who also serves on the editorial staff of Railroad Model Craftsman and as editor of HO Collector magazine.

== Contents ==
Each issue of Model Railroad News features news and reviews of products in all popular scales, with HO scale, N scale, and O scale as the leading categories. Not owned or affiliated with any manufacturer, the magazine provides unbiased reviews and information. Editor Tony Cook authors "From the Archives," a monthly column that looks back at the history of the model railroad industry or a particular product.

== History ==
Model Railroad News was founded in 1995 by Mike Lindsay and Lamplight Publishing. During this period it was headquartered in Merlin, Oregon. The magazine temporarily ceased publication in October 2011.

The magazine has been published monthly by White River Productions since they acquired the title in 2012.
