= Illinois Central 790 =

Preserved 2-8-0 steam locomotive

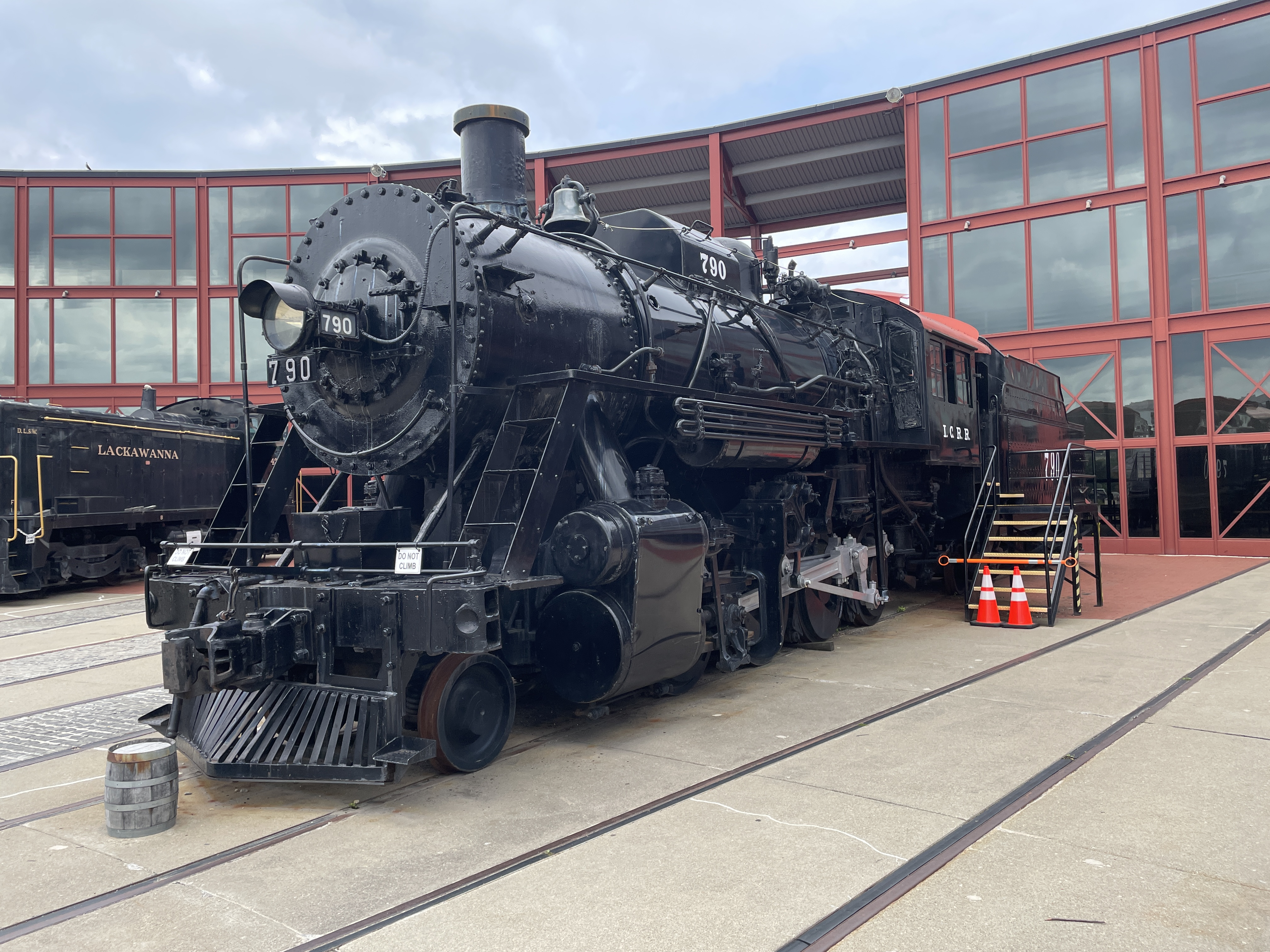
- No. 790 on static display at Steamtown National Historic Site, on July 24, 2023
Type and origin
- Power type: Steam
- Builder: American Locomotive Company (Cooke Works)
- Serial number: 28686
- Build date: September 1903
- Rebuild date: 1918
Specifications
- Configuration
  - Whyte: 2-8-0
- Gauge: 4 ft 8 1/2 in (1,435 mm)
- Driver dia.: 51 in (1,295 mm)
- Adhesive weight: 158,900 lb (72.1 t)
- Loco weight: 183,100 lb (83.1 t)
- Fuel type: Coal
- Boiler pressure: 190 psi (1,300 kPa)
- Cylinders: Two, outside
- Cylinder size: 22 in × 26 in (559 mm × 660 mm)
- Valve gear: Walschaerts
- Valve type: Piston valves
- Loco brake: Air
- Train brakes: Air
- Couplers: Knuckle
Performance figures
- Tractive effort: 41,946 lbf (186.59 kN)
Career
- Operators: Chicago Union Transfer Railway; Illinois Central Railroad; Steam Trains, Inc.; Clinton Corn Processing Company
- Numbers: CUTR 100; IC 641; IC 790
- Last run: April 1965
- Retired: 1950s (revenue service); 1966 (excursion service)
- Restored: September 1960 (1st excursion service); July 1, 2012 (cosmetically)
- Current owner: Steamtown National Historic Site
- Disposition: On static display

Illinois Central 790 is a preserved 2-8-0 "Consolidation" type steam locomotive, built in September 1903 by American Locomotive Company's (ALCO) Cooke Works. In 1959, No. 790 was saved from scrap and purchased by Lou Keller, and he used it to pull excursion trains in Iowa. In 1965, the locomotive was sold to a New York businessman, who, in turn, sold it the following year to F. Nelson Blount, the founder of Steamtown, U.S.A. As of 2026, No. 790 is on static display at Steamtown National Historic Site (NHS) in Scranton, Pennsylvania.

== History ==
=== Revenue service ===
No. 790 was constructed in September 1903 by the American Locomotive Company’s (ALCO) former Cooke Locomotive Works in Paterson, New Jersey. It was originally owned and operated by Chicago Union Transfer Railway and numbered 100. In 1904, No. 100 and its three sibling locomotives (Nos. 101–103) were sold to the Illinois Central Railroad (IC), and they were renumbered 641–644. No. 641 pulled heavy freight trains for the IC in Tennessee, and later, in 1918, the locomotive was rebuilt and modified with superheater equipment.

In January 1943, Nos. 641–644 were renumbered again as 790–793. During the 1950s, the IC—having discovered the financial benefits of dieselizing their fleet—was removing their steam locomotives from revenue service, and in doing so, they put Nos. 790–793 in storage. Two of the locomotives, Nos. 791 and 793, were scrapped in 1955, and No. 792 followed suit in August 1957. No. 790 was stored in Memphis, Tennessee while its scrap schedule was pending.

=== Preservation ===
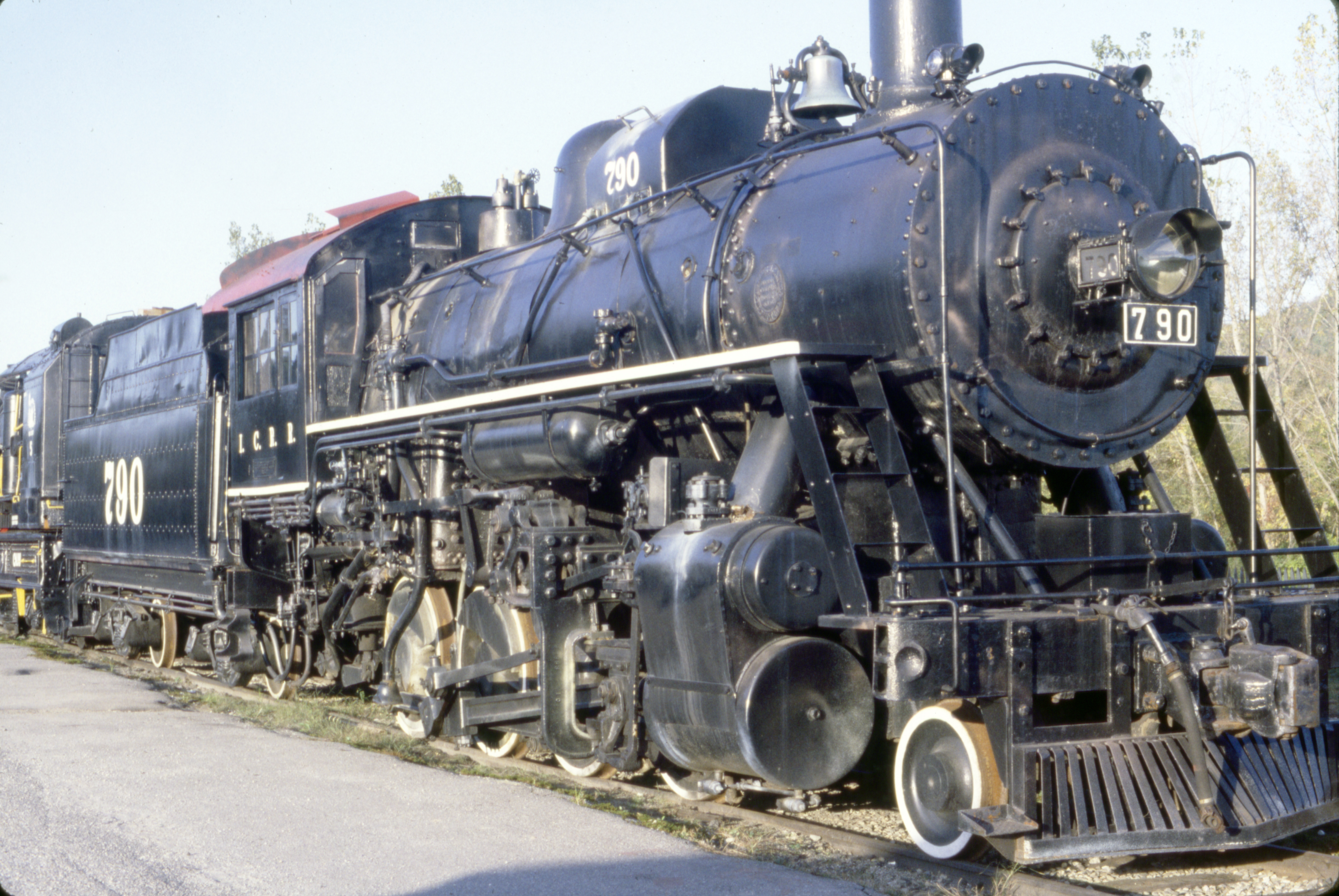
No. 790 on display at Steamtown, U.S.A., in October 1983

In 1959, No. 790 was purchased by Louis S. Keller, a member of the National Railway Historical Society’s (NRHS) Iowa Chapter, and he had it moved to a former Rock Island roundhouse near Cedar Rapids, Iowa for an overhaul. Keller made plans to host steam excursions with the locomotive, but the IC refused to operate it for him. Keller subsequently reached an agreement with the Milwaukee Road (MILW), and on September 17–18, 1960, No. 790 pulled two excursions on the MILW mainline between Cedar Rapids and Ottumwa, Iowa. 622 passengers were on board both trains, including Charles Jones, Sr., the son of IC engineer Casey Jones, and the No. 790 was named after Casey Jones, in his honor. Under Lou Keller’s new company, Steam Trains, Inc., No. 790 pulled some additional excursion trains during the annual All-Iowa Fair on the Cedar Rapids and Iowa City Railway between Cedar Rapids and Iowa City, and it was displayed at Hawkeye Downs when inactive.

In April 1965, the Clinton Corn Processing Company loaned No. 790 to switch freight cars of corn stock out of their plant in Clinton, Iowa, since their plant and some surrounding trackage were flooded from the nearby Mississippi River, prohibiting the use of water-sensitive diesel locomotives. This was considered the final commercial freight operation to be performed by an IC steam locomotive. Shortly after the flood operation, Lou Keller sold No. 790 to David de Camp of Old Westbury, New York, and he moved it to Lake Placid to eventually use the locomotive to pull excursion and ski trains on the New York Central (NYC) mainline in the Adirondack Mountains. By the end of 1965, the operation plans fell through, and de Camp put his locomotive up for sale. In January 1966, No. 790 was sold again to F. Nelson Blount, who added it to his Steamtown, U.S.A. collection in Bellows Falls, Vermont. The locomotive was eventually moved alongside the rest of the Steamtown collection to Scranton, Pennsylvania. After the nationalization of Steamtown, Steamtown National Historic Site retained the No. 790 locomotive on the suggestion of the Steamtown Special History Study.

== See also ==
- Canadian National 3254
- Canadian Pacific 2317
- Grand Trunk Western 4070
- Illinois Central 2613
- Soo Line 1003

== Bibliography ==
- Edson, William D. (Spring 1979). "Locomotive Rosters Illinois Central Railroad and Predecessor Lines". Railroad History. 140 (140). Railway and Locomotive Historical Society: 38. JSTOR 43523944.
- Downey, Cliff (January 1998). "The Last Decade of Illinois Central Steam". Railfan & Railroad. Vol. 17, no. 1. Carstens Publications. pp. 43–49.
