= Rail News =

Rail News may refer to:

- Railnews, a national newspaper for the British rail industry
- Rail News (South Australian Railways)
- RailNews, a defunct American railway magazine, previously named Pacific RailNews
