= Pacific Locomotive Association =

Coordinates: 37.597804°N 121.917918°W

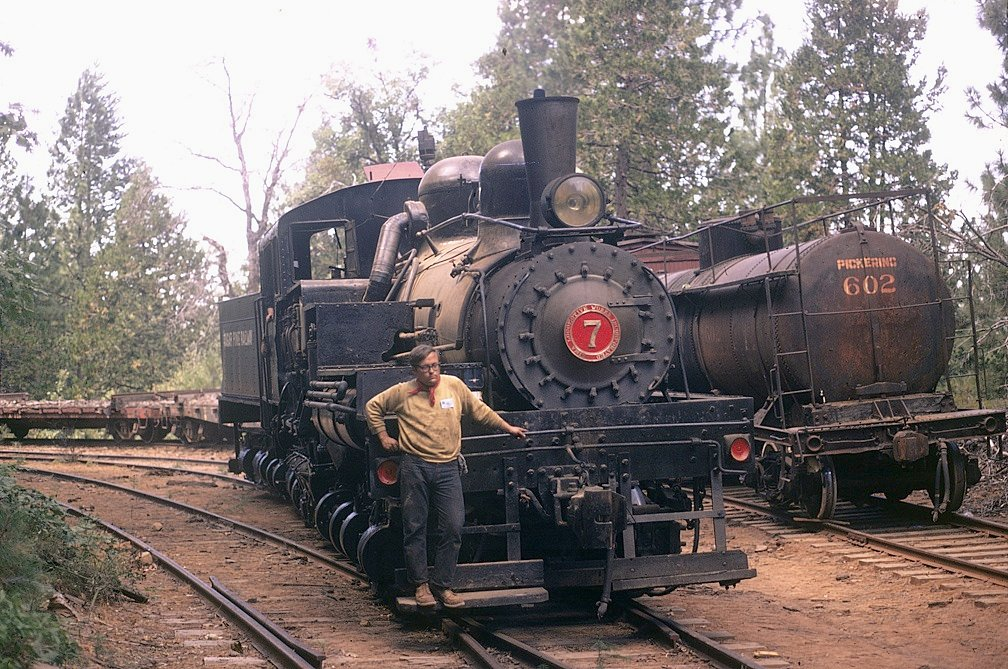
A PLA excursion, Labor Day 1971. Pickering Lumber Company Shay #7, Northern California, between Lyons Dam and Tramway.

The Pacific Locomotive Association, Inc. (PLA) is a non-profit organization dedicated to the preservation of the physical aspects and atmosphere of Pacific Coast railroading during the period from 1910 to 1960.

The Pacific Locomotive Association operates the Niles Canyon Railway, and has railroad artifacts on display in the Niles Depot Museum in Fremont, California. It also owns a collection of locomotives and other railroad cars, with restorations complete or in progress.

== History ==
The PLA was formed by six people from the San Francisco Peninsula in 1961. Prompted to take action by the recent demise of mainline steam railroading, the PLA was established to promote passenger excursion trains featuring unique and unusual locations and equipment. They also hoped to preserve elements of the steam era for future generations.

Two of the PLA's first trips set the stage for the organization's early activities. The first of these was a May 1961 visit to the Howard Terminal Railway, and featured their last steam locomotive, No. 6. Shortly afterward, this steam engine was officially retired. Three members purchased this engine for $250 from Peter and Harmon Howard, on the condition that 'the engine never be scrapped'. Thus No. 6 became the first artifact of railroad history to be preserved by the PLA. The bell of the locomotive was not part of the sale but was kept by Peter Howard for a number of years. He then gave it to the PLA gratis.

A second field trip was held the following month. This trip featured the Blake Brothers rail operation on the shore of San Francisco Bay at Point Molate, near the eastern end of Richmond-San Rafael Bridge. Their two-truck Heisler locomotive was operated over the railroad after many years of storage, but only after the group dug out the rails which had been buried by years of quarry dust.

The formal organization of the Pacific Locomotive Association took place at Burlingame, California, in July, 1961. The original members were Charles Heimerdinger, Jr., Karl R. Koenig, Henry Luna, Thomas Eikrenkotter, Bart Gregg and Robert Field. Henry Luna was elected as the first president. As there were six charter members, and the first field trip featured engine No. 6, the present PLA logo is in the form of a locomotive's number plate with '6' in the center.

In 1962 two trips open to the public were sponsored over the California Western Railroad. The first was from Ft. Bragg to Willits and return in August, using the railroad's M200 "Skunk". This trip sold out quickly, so it was repeated a month later. Round-trip fare, including coffee and donuts, was $6.35. The historic M200, built in 1926, was later purchased by PLA to save it from being scrapped, and now operates regularly on the Niles Canyon Railway.

In the mid 1990s a group of current and former Southern Pacific employees operating an organization known as "Project 2467 Inc." with the goal of restoring and maintaining former Southern Pacific steam locomotive number 2467 merged into the PLA.

The PLA news bulletin, sent to members each month, grew into a full-fledged railroad news magazine. Single issues and subscriptions to PLA's Pacific News were sold as a fund raiser. They were initially written, edited and produced by Karl R. Koenig on a Ditto machine, but as demand increased it eventually became cost-effective to use a professional printer. The magazine was eventually spun off and published independently, by Chatham Publishing Company until 1983 when it was sold to Interurban Press (and later Pentrex). The name was later changed to Pacific RailNews and, with expanded coverage and national distribution, it was later shortened to its final name, Rail News. Although successful for many years the magazine was discontinued by Pentrex in 1999.

In 1965 two other steam locomotives became available for preservation. A donation by Connell Brothers Trucking of Stockton gave the PLA two additional steam locomotives; No. 5, a rare three-truck Heisler locomotive, and No. 12, the oldest standard gauge three-truck Shay locomotive known to exist.

By 1967, the previously mentioned Blake Brothers quarry railroad, then owned by Quarry Products, Inc., had ceased rail operations at Point Richmond. Originally known as the Castro Point Railway and Terminal Co., this railroad had been a joint operation with the Key System, which used the railroad for its streetcars to reach the Richmond-San Rafael Ferry terminal. Quarry Products leased the railroad to the PLA for one dollar per year.

As other historic locomotives and cars were acquired, they were moved to the Castro Point Railway. An agreement was reached in 1973 to use trackage in the adjoining Point Molate Naval Fuel Depot for a terminal where PLA's equipment could be stored and maintained.

Over the years, eleven steam locomotives and ten internal combustion locomotives, plus more than 35 passenger and freight cars, have been added to PLA's historic collection. Many of these were restored to active status and operated over the Castro Point Railway. This operating railroad museum began in 1969, and ran for the public until December, 1985, when the U.S. Navy, concerned about security, canceled the agreement.

As operations were coming to an end at Castro Point, the Southern Pacific Railroad was in the process of ending service on its line through Niles Canyon and over Altamont Pass, transferring its right-of-way to Alameda County after removal of the track. The County agreed to lease the Niles Canyon portion of the right-of-way to the PLA as a new home for the PLA’s collection and operations.

Volunteer PLA members began relaying the track with some rail donated by both the Southern Pacific and Union Pacific Railroad. The first section, between Sunol and Brightside, was opened using California Western "Skunk" M200 on May 21, 1988. Between 1988 and 1994, track laying through the Canyon continued to Vallejo Mill Park, just short of Niles. Rails were extended to downtown Niles on September 19, 1998. Today the PLA operates the NCRy, a seven-mile railroad through the well-preserved and scenic Niles Canyon, and tens of thousands of people visit the railroad annually. Track reconstruction presently continues to the east along the five miles of right-of-way available between Sunol and Pleasanton.

== Current activities ==
Today, the PLA has over 1000 members and contributing sponsors. A variety of railroad activities are available to the membership. Some enjoy rail trips to unusual destinations. Others take pleasure from the social aspect, attending the monthly meetings, special barbecues, events and dinners. While others take an interest in preserving railroad history, whether through research, writing, photography or working on the Niles Canyon Railway, still others, not living near the Bay Area, take pride in the continuous improvements and expansion by making contributions to help the museum grow.

The PLA has continued to operate public excursions over most of California's railroads, including the Sierra, Santa Fe, McCloud and the Union Pacific. Other rail trips have taken members across Canada and as far as Ecuador, Chile, Cuba and China.

At Niles Canyon, all restoration, expansion and preservation work, including track building and maintenance work on locomotives, rail cars, buildings, etc., is accomplished by PLA volunteer members. Activities vary from simple tasks requiring no experience, to working as a skilled mechanical technician, locomotive engineer or other member of a train crew.
