= Illinois Central 2613 =

Scrapped 4-8-2 steam locomotive

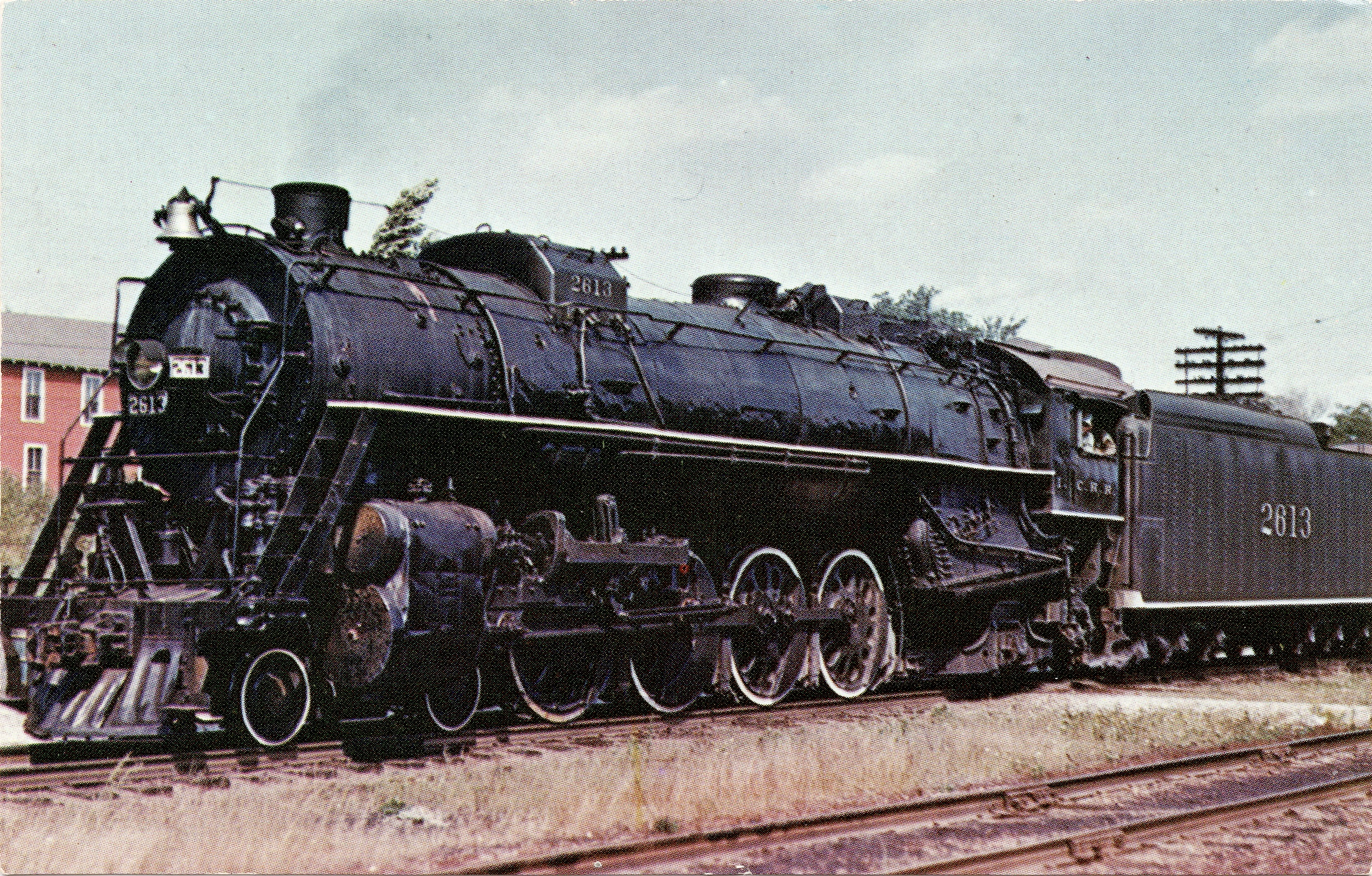
- IC No. 2613 at Central City, Kentucky during its final run on October 2, 1960
Type and origin
- Power type: Steam
- Builder: Paducah Shops
- Build date: April 1943
Specifications
- Configuration
  - Whyte: 4-8-2
  - UIC: 2’D1’
- Gauge: 4 ft 8 1/2 in (1,435 mm)
- Driver dia.: 70 in (1.778 m)
- Wheelbase: 92.34 ft (2,815 cm)
  - Engine: 42.25 ft (1,288 cm)
  - Drivers: 18.25 ft (556 cm)
- Adhesive weight: 293,880 lb (133,300 kg)
- Loco weight: 423,893 lb (192,275 kg)
- Tender weight: 370,500 lb (168,100 kg)
- Total weight: 794,393 lb (360,331 kg)
- Fuel type: Coal
- Fuel capacity: 26 t (57,000 lb)
- Water cap.: 22,000 imp gal (100,000 L; 26,000 US gal)
- Firebox
  - Grate area: 88.30 sq ft (8.203 m^{2})
- Boiler pressure: 275 psi (1,900 kPa)
- Heating surface
  - Firebox: 467 sq ft (43.4 m^{2})
- Superheater
  - Heating area: 1,619 sq ft (150 m^{2})
- Cylinders: Two, outside
- High-pressure cylinder: 28 in × 30 in (710 mm × 760 mm)
- Valve gear: Walschaerts
- Valve type: Piston valves
- Loco brake: Air
- Train brakes: Air
- Couplers: Knuckle
Performance figures
- Maximum speed: 70 mph (110 km/h)
- Tractive effort: 78,450 lbf (348.96 kN)
- Factor of adh.: 3.74
Career
- Operators: Illinois Central Railroad; Louisville and Nashville Railroad (leased)
- Class: IC 2600
- Number in class: 14 out of 20
- Numbers: 2613
- First run: 1943
- Last run: October 2, 1960
- Retired: 1960
- Scrapped: 1961
- Disposition: Scrapped

Illinois Central 2613 was a 4-8-2 "Mountain" type 2600 class steam locomotive, built in April 1943 by the Illinois Central Railroad's Paducah Shops in Paducah, Kentucky. No. 2613 and its classmates were the most powerful 4-8-2 locomotives ever built.

The locomotive was eventually used to pull the Louisville and Nashville Railroad's centennial train in 1959, and then it pulled two fantrip excursions on the Illinois Central in 1960. Despite efforts being made to preserve No. 2613, the Illinois Central scrapped it in 1961.

== History ==
=== Construction and design ===
No. 2613 was one of twenty 2600 class 4-8-2 locomotives, Nos. 2600-2619, constructed at the Illinois Central Railroad's (IC) Paducah Shops in Paducah, Kentucky, between November 1942 and August 1943. Construction involved fabricating new boilers and shipping in one-piece cast frames from General Steel Castings in Granite City, Illinois. The locomotives were also equipped with twelve-wheel tenders that held 20,000 US gallons (16,653 imp gal) of water and 26 tonnes (26,000 kg) of coal; a design feature that was rare on IC steam locomotives. The 2600 class was a step-up design of the IC 2500 class 4-8-2's, and their design was identical to the Baldwin-built 2800 series locomotives on the Wabash Railroad, but the 2600's were larger and heavier.

The 2600's were equipped with 70-inch (1,800 mm) diameter Boxpok and Baldwin spoke driving wheels, 28-by-30-inch (710 mm × 760 mm) cylinders—which were slightly smaller than those on the 2500's—and a boiler pressure of 275 psi (1,900 kPa). They were able to generate 78,450 lbf (349.0 kN) of tractive effort and travel at a top speed of 70 miles per hour (110 km/h), making the IC 2600's the most powerful 4-8-2 locomotives ever built. They also lacked new design features that were commonly used by other railroads, including feedwater heaters, boosters, and roller bearings, making the 2600 designs simplified.

=== Revenue service ===
No. 2613 and most of the other 2600's and 2500's were assigned to pull freight trains from Chicago to East St. Louis and Cairo, and in later years, they operated on the IC's primary route between Chicago and Memphis, Tennessee. In 1950, after EMD GP7 demonstrator No. 300 was tested on the IC, IC management decided to retire their entire steam locomotive fleet and replace them with locomotives from EMD. Many GP7's and GP9's were delivered to the railroad during the 1950s, and by the end of 1956, the Chicago-Memphis route was dieselized. No. 2613 was subsequently reassigned to operate in the St. Louis Division, where many coal mines the railroad served were located. In February 1959, No. 2613 was put into storage at Centralia, Illinois, after additional diesel locomotives were assigned to the St. Louis Division, and the railroad was completely dieselized by June.

=== Excursion service ===
Later that year, the Louisville and Nashville Railroad (L&N), which had already retired all of their steam locomotives, was looking for a steam locomotive for use in pulling a train that celebrated the 100th anniversary of their first passenger train. The IC agreed to lease No. 2613 to the L&N for the run, and the 2600 was cleaned and repainted at the Paducah Shops. On October 24, 1959, No. 2613 pulled the L&N's fifteen-car Centennial train from Louisville, Kentucky to Nashville, Tennessee and return, and 850 passengers were on board. Despite the locomotive running out of coal shortly before arrival in Nashville, it completed the run without incident. After the centennial run ended, No. 2613 returned to Paducah with a freight train in tow, and the IC had planned to put the locomotive back into storage.

A concurrent boost in coal traffic in the Kentucky Division encouraged officials to return some of their steam locomotives to service, and beginning on October 28, the No. 2613 pulled coal trains around Paducah alongside 2-10-2 No. 2807, and later, 2-10-2's Nos. 2739, 2802, and 4-8-2 No. 2524. By the end of March 1960, all steam locomotives in the Kentucky Division were put back into storage at Paducah. On May 14, No. 2613 pulled The Bluegrass Safari, a sight-seeing excursion train sponsored by Rail Museum Safaris, and it toured the IC between Louisville and Paducah. At Paducah, passengers were allowed to tour the IC shops and roundhouse, where No. 2739 was fired up as back-up power for whenever No. 2613 suffered a mechanical problem, but the latter ran without any problems. On October 2, No. 2613 pulled another excursion train between Louisville and Dawson Springs, and it was sponsored by the Louisville Chapter of the National Railway Historical Society (NRHS). No. 2613 became the very last steam locomotive to operate under IC ownership after the October 2 run.

=== Scrapping and legacy ===
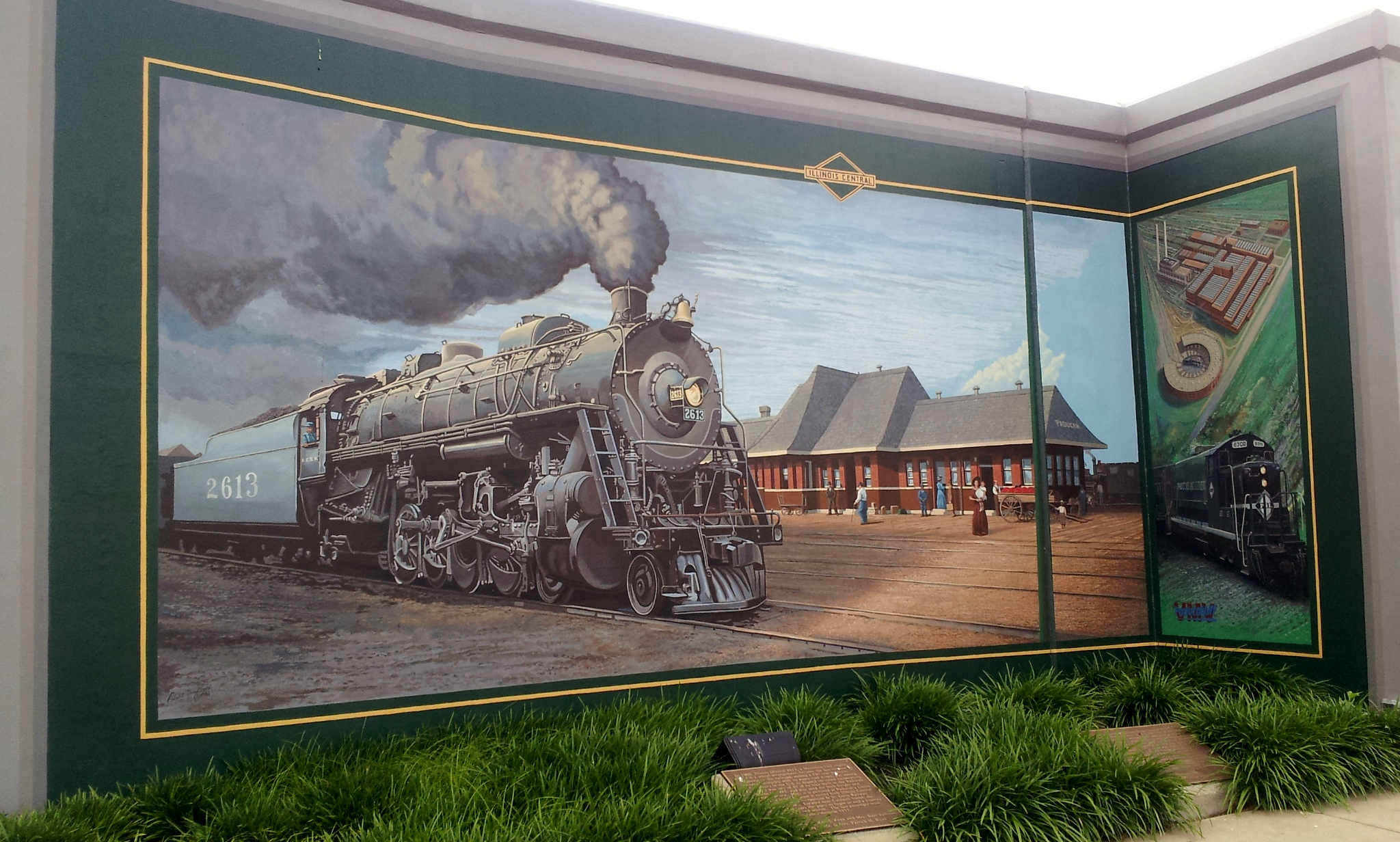
A painting of IC No. 2613 at the flood wall murals of Paducah, Kentucky

In late 1961, the IC opted to scrap all of their remaining steam locomotives with their own crews, since they made more money by selling locomotive remains in gondola cars as scrap than by selling intact locomotives to scrap dealers. The Kentucky Railway Museum (KRM) of Louisville began negotiating with the IC to acquire the locomotive, with several members traveling to Chicago to meet with IC management, but the railroad was only interested in selling the 2613 for its scrap value, instead of donating it.

The KRM, which had only been formed a few years prior, could not raise enough money to meet IC's demands. By January 1962, No. 2613 and all of the other remaining 2600s were dismantled in Paducah. For unknown reasons, tenders from the 2600s remained in storage for some time, after their companion locomotives were scrapped, including that of No. 2613.

Since early 1996, a team of mural artists from Lafayette, Louisiana, led by Robert Dafford, painted murals on the downtown Paducah flood walls to address Paducah's history, and one of the murals is dedicated to IC No. 2613 and its final runs in 1960.

== See also ==
- Chicago, Burlington and Quincy 5632
- Grand Trunk Western 5629
- Illinois Central 790
- Illinois Central No. 1

== Bibliography ==
- Downey, Cliff (January 1998). "The Last Decade of Illinois Central Steam". Railfan & Railroad. Vol. 17, no. 1. Carstens Publications. pp. 38–49.
- Drury, George H. (2015). Guide to North American Steam Locomotives (2nd ed.). Kalmbach Media. ISBN 978-1-62700-259-2.
