= Virginian and Ohio =

Fictional railroad company and HO scale model railroad near Dayton, Ohio, US

The Virginian and Ohio is both the name of a fictional railroad company created by W. Allen McClelland (1934-2022) and the HO scale model railroad he built near Dayton, Ohio featuring this railroad. The V&O is famous in the model railroading world for setting a new standard for freelanced (fictional) model railroads designed to operate in a prototypical manner and was a major influence upon many model railroaders of the time. He used the words "beyond the basement" and "transportation system" to reinforce the idea of moving freight from shippers and industries beyond the confines of the limited model railroad geography and layout you had in your basement. This required the notion of interchange with other (model) railroads as well. The V&O had a shortline railroad on the layout, the KC&B (Kellys Creek & Bradley, named after his children), to provide a source of interchange traffic.

== Model railroad ==
Construction on the V&O was started in November, 1961. The era was set in 1957. The initial 136 foot Code 70 main line, operating from Afton, VA to a concealed staging loop at Elm Grove, VA was completed exactly a year later on 11/25/62. In the mid 1970s, Allen McClelland began a second phase of construction that expanded the railroad from Elm Grove to Kingswood Junction, VA. Given Allen McClelland's interest in prototypical model railroad operations, along with the changes in prototype railroads during this time, the V&O ended up moving forward in time a couple of times. A minimal example of this principle was moving the railroad forward one year from 1957 to 1958 so that V&O SD-24s could be modeled using the latest release from Atlas during the mid-70s. A more drastic example was in 1980 (railroad date August 26, 1958) when the V&O ran its last regular revenue steam service and was completely dieselized. During this time, Allen McClelland moved the era up a decade from 1958 to 1968, resulting in the loss of some older and minority builder V&O 1st-Generation diesels. However, the era shift also saw the introduction of many newer 2nd-Generation diesels alongside newer and larger freight cars, just like the prototype. In the mid-late 1990s, the railroad was expanded between Fullerton, VA and Indian Hill Junction, VA as part of a coinciding home expansion. This expansion saw the removal of existing scenes at Gauge Pass, VA and Highland Wye, VA along with the relocation of Durham Sub and Smith Sub staging tracks. This time period also saw the railroad shift from 1968 to 1975, resulting in the loss of even more 1st-Generation diesels like F-7As and FAs. Independent passenger service was ended in April 1971 with the creation of Amtrak with the Ridge Runner being the only passenger service left on the Afton Division.

Operating sessions on the V&O were for 24 hours in railroad time, accomplished in four actual hours using a 6:1 "fast clock". Eight operators were used (minimally six) and followed a Train Procedures book and used car-cards and waybills. The V&O was a bridge route, and most mainline traffic was to and from points beyond the V&O. 30-40 trains per day were needed to carry the V&O traffic. An important concept was that the use of walk-around throttles enabled operators to follow their trains from point to point and eliminated the doubling back and running in circles common on other model railroads. The V&O had Centralized Traffic Control (CTC), a dispatcher console, and pioneered the use of command control equipment, starting with the GE Astrac system in 1963.

In 2001, a move into a new home unfortunately forced Allen McClelland to dismantle the original V&O Afton Division. The Clintwood section of this layout is currently stored at the National Model Railroad Association's headquarters building in Soddy-Daisy, TN, pending public display in the Scale Model Railroading exhibit at the California State Railroad Museum in Sacramento. At this time, Allen McClelland also began construction on his V&O Gauley Division layout, picking up from the western end of the Afton Division and carrying on from there. However, construction of this new V&O was cut short in 2008 by yet another move, but this time to a retirement home without space for a layout as detailed in the October 2008 issue of Scale Rails (the official publication of the National Model Railroad Association), and the January 2009 issue of Model Railroader.

== Appalachian Lines ==
Several factors came into play in the formation of the Appalachian Lines. Model railroaders Tony Koester and Steve King had quickly become friends as they developed their interest in proto-freelancing (developing a freelanced railroad based on prototype railroads and practices ) and railroad operations. The V&O was greatly influenced by prototype railroads even as they continued to move forward while the V&O remained in 1958. This desire to stay up-to-date with real railroading was reflect in Allen McClelland's interest in prototype modeling. Heavily influenced by repeat visits to Appalachian coal country, and the realization that their three small regional railroads would face challenges surviving the real world economy of the 1970s, Tony Koester suggested that Allen's V&O, his Allegheny Midland and King's Virginia Midland form the Appalachian Lines. Modeled after the Chessie System and the SCL/L&N Family Lines, each railroad would retain its own corporate identity and color scheme, but would follow a standardized layout for paint schemes. The V&O would keep its deep blue and white, the AM would adopt a bright red and yellow, and the VM would go with yellow and deep green. Although the Appalachian Lines was initially stated to be formed in 1976, the actual amalgamation took place almost a decade earlier in 1968. Like Chessie System and Family Lines, the Appalachian Lines name would be used in marketing and advertising, allowing the three railroads to pool their resources to remain competitive. Not only was this a great excuse to use "run-through" power from connecting AM and VM roads, but it also helped strengthen the idea that all three railroads were part of a larger system, and in fact connected to the national railroad network. Thanks to regular coverage in both Railroad Model Craftsman (of which Koester was editor at the time) and Model Railroader magazines, this is probably the most well-known period of the V&O's operations.

Born in 1934, Allen McClelland died on October 28, 2022, following complications from a massive stroke.
