= RailNews =

RailNews may refer to:

- Railnews, a national newspaper for the British rail industry
- RailNews, a defunct American railway magazine, previously named Pacific RailNews
