= James Bush =

James Bush may refer to:

- James Bush (sportsman) (1850–1924), English sportsman
- James Bush (RFC officer) (1891–1917), UK World War I ace
- James Bush (politician) (born 1955), member of the Florida House of Representatives
- James Smith Bush (1825–1889), attorney, Episcopal priest, and religious writer
- James Bush (actor) (1907–1987), actor in American films of the 1930s and 1940s
- James Wood Bush (c. 1844/8–1906), American Civil War veteran from the Kingdom of Hawaii
