= Railroad Model Craftsman =

American model railroading magazine

- Editor: Otto Vondrak
- Categories: Rail transport modeling
- Frequency: Monthly
- Publisher: White River Productions
- First issue: 1933
- Country: USA
- Website: rrmodelcraftsman.com
- ISSN: 0033-877X

Railroad Model Craftsman is an American magazine specializing in the hobby of model railroading. The magazine is published monthly by White River Productions, which acquired the title from Carstens Publications in 2014. Its first issue in March 1933 was called The Model Craftsman because it covered other areas of scale modeling as well. Founded by Emanuele Stieri, it was second editor Charles A. Penn who helped grow the company and lead the publication towards the hobby of scale models. In April 1949 it changed its focus to model trains and changed its name to Railroad Model Craftsman to reflect this change in editorial content. While it can claim to be the oldest model railroading magazine in continuous publication in the United States, rival Model Railroader counters with the tagline "Model railroading exclusively since 1934." (However, both were predated by The Model Maker, which dates from 1924, and showcased working models of steam engines, trains, and boats.) Over the years, several other titles have been folded into the publication, including Toy Trains, Electric Trains and Hobby Railroading, Miniature Rail Roading, Model & Railway News, and The O Gager.

== History ==
=== 1933–1962: Stieri and Penn years ===
The company was founded in 1933 by Emanuele Stieri, a prolific how-to writer, and was the first editor-in-chief of the fledgling publication. Published by Model Craftsman Publishing Corp., the company moved headquarters from Chicago to New York City in 1934. The company was acquired by Charles A. Penn in 1935. Booklyn native Harold V. Loose was an influential editor of the magazine from 1938-1940. The company relocated to suburban Ramsey, New Jersey in 1940. During the 1940s, the staff consisted of Charles Penn as editor and publisher, Robert W. Thompson as managing editor, Lewis Austin as the model railroad editor, Leon Shulman as the model airplane editor, and Louis H. Hertz as the research editor. After World War II, Robert Thompson was succeeded by his brother Jim as managing editor.

In December 1940, the magazine absorbed The Modelmaker, which was first published by Spon & Chamberlain in January 1924 and was the only magazine dedicated to model building until Model Craftsman was founded. The magazine also increased to 74 pages.

As the magazine's editorial focus shifted entirely toward the hobby of model railroading, the publication was renamed "Model Railroad Craftsman" in April 1949. Feeling the name was too close to that of Model Railroader, publisher Al Kalmbach asked for a slight name change as professional courtesy. As a result, "Railroad Model Craftsman" debuted in July 1949.

Harold Carstens joined the staff as an associate editor in 1952, after previously contributing several articles. As of 1954, the magazine staff consisted of Charles Penn as editor and publisher, Jim Thompson as executive editor, Hal Carstens as managing editor, Sam Skean, Bill Schopp as technical editor, and Edwin P. Alexander as research editor.

=== 1962–2014: Under the Carstens ===
In 1962, Hal Carstens was named publisher and president following the retirement of Charles Penn. Hal Carstens later purchased the company, and the name was changed to Carstens Publications in 1969. Tony Koester joined the staff as an associate editor in 1968, and later became managing editor in 1971. By 1972, Jim Boyd was working full-time as editor of Flying Models, but was also listed as an associate editor of RMC. The last big move came in 1973 when the publishing company moved to rural Newton in northern New Jersey, housed in a newly constructed suite of offices with an attached warehouse. Koester and Boyd worked together to push more modern prototype content and fine scale modeling features in contrast to the more loose interpretations of the hobby previously published by Hal Carstens. Boyd would be named editor of the new Railfan & Railroad magazine launched by Carstens in 1974.

By 1980, Jim Boyd and Bill Schaumburg were listed as associate editors (Bill joined the staff in November 1976). In 1981, Bill Schaumburg succeeded Koester as managing editor, and Chris D'Amato and Jim Ankrom joined the staff as associate editors in 1982. By the mid-1980s, Boyd was dropped from the masthead as he was now concentrating full-time as editor of Railfan & Railroad.

The magazine was published 12 times a year by Carstens Publications, located in Newton, New Jersey. As its name would suggest, Railroad Model Craftsman concentrates more on scratch building and kitbashing than its closest competitor. In-depth features relating to prototype historical research, model construction techniques, and high-quality detailing and finishing are common themes. The editors have also closely followed the emerging trend of Railway Prototype Modelers, who seek to reproduce scale replicas of actual existing pieces of railway equipment as closely as possible, and share those techniques with other modelers. Although the magazine is not scale-specific, most of its plans are published either in HO scale or O scale, with instructions on converting them to other scales. Almost all of the content in the magazine is generated by readers, with very few articles produced by the editors.

Publisher Hal Carstens died on June 23, 2009, with his son Henry Carstens assuming day-to-day control of the company.

Enjoying a long career as RMC's longest serving editor, Bill Schaumburg retired in February 2013. After his departure, the staff of the magazine consisted of editor Chris D'Amato, associate editor Jim Ankrom, and part-time associate editor Scott Lupia. Most of the accompanying art work, maps, and track plans were produced by illustrators Ken Lawrence and Otto Vondrak.

=== Since 2014: White River Productions ===
After years of financial struggle, Carstens Publications president Henry Carstens announced the company's permanent closure on August 22, 2014. On September 1, 2014, White River Productions of Bucklin, Missouri, announced their acquisition of Railroad Model Craftsman as well as sister publication Railfan & Railroad. Beginning with the January 2015 issue, the primary editorial staff consisted of Stephen Priest and Tony Cook, the first major change since the 1980s. Harry K. Wong later joined the staff as an associate editor. The magazine was completely redesigned, and some columns were retired, while others have been renamed ("Safety Valve" became "Postmarks" in 2014, restored to its original name in 2019). The magazine continued to produce in-depth features focused on scale model construction and prototype research.

In February 2019, Otto Vondrak was named the eighth editor of Railroad Model Craftsman, effective with the May 2019 issue, and splitting his duties as associate editor of Railfan & Railroad. The rest of the staff consists of Harry K. Wong as associate editor, and Todd Gillette as graphic designer. In April 2020, Justin Franz joined the staff as associate editor.

== Magazine sections ==
The main part of the magazine is dedicated to the features. The subjects can range from a tour of a model railroad; to historical research related to a structure, piece of equipment, or entire railroad line; to the construction, painting, and detailing of a scale model.

Safety Valve - (Formerly "Postmarks" from 2014-2019) A column of letters submitted to the editors by the readers of RMC expressing opinions about or sharing news related to features published in the magazine. Printed on a space-available basis.

Receiving Yard - (Formerly "Dispatcher's Report") This section features announcements from various hobby manufacturers of new model railroading products available. Descriptions are brief and contain contact information for the manufacturer or their representative, compiled by associate editor Harry K. Wong.

Railbooks - Various new books and recordings related to the world of railroading and scale models are reviewed in-depth by the editors and other authors.

Timetable - A listing of model railroad related events taking place around the country, submitted by readers, and published on a space-available basis.

Dremel Kitbashing Award - Co-sponsored by hobby tool manufacturer Dremel, is awarded to a hobbyist who completes a well-executed kitbashing project in any scale, using a variety of model building techniques. Dremel ended its support for the award in 2022, ending a 50-year run.

Scratchbuilder's Workshop - (Formerly "Scratchbuilder's Corner") This regular monthly column was launched in 2002. Each month, veteran model builder Bob Walker discusses tips, techniques, and philosophy related to the construction of scale models from scratch, otherwise known as "scratchbuilding." Walker retired from the column in 2019, and a number of authors contribute to the monthly Craftsman Workshop column in its place.

Test Track - In-depth product reviews of new tools, models, and other equipment related to model railroading, compiled by associate editor Harry K. Wong.

Editor's Notebook - News and editorial commentary by editor Otto Vondrak.

Look Both Ways - Launched in 2014, this monthly column explores some of the philosophy and reason behind the construction of model railroads and the hobby experience as a whole, authored by Mike Schafer (editor of Passenger Train Journal) and modeler Bill Navigato. The last edition of this column was January 2021, when the authors announced their retirement.

Collector Consist - Previously authored by Keith Wills, the column was reactivated in 2019 and is authored by Tony Cook, editor of HO Collector magazine. This quarterly column explores pioneering examples of scale model trains from the last fifty years.

Company Photographer - This quarterly column was reactivated in 2019 to demonstrate various photography techniques as it applies to model railroading.

Painting and Weathering - A new quarterly column launched in 2019 to demonstrate various methods of painting and weathering models.

Branch Line on a Shelf - A new bi-monthly column launched in January 2022 where author Scott Thornton describes his process to build a model railroad utilizing a modern shallow shelf design.
