= Tony Koester =

American model railroad builder

J. Anthony Koester, more commonly known as Tony Koester, is a well-known member of the United States model railroading community. Along with his friend Allen McClelland and his Virginian & Ohio, Koester popularized the idea of proto-freelancing with his HO scale model railroad, the Allegheny Midland.

Born in Iowa, he moved with his family to Cayuga, Indiana. At Purdue University in the early 1960s, he studied electrical engineering, communication, and art. While at Purdue, he was also a member and president of the Purdue Railroad Club. In 1966, with Glenn Pizer he co-founded the Nickel Plate Road Historical & Technical Society to preserve the memory of his favorite railroad.

In 1969, Koester and his wife and children moved from Indiana to northeastern New Jersey to take a position with Carstens Publications as editor of Railroad Model Craftsman. In 1973, the company moved to Newton in northwestern New Jersey, and the Koesters built a new home that housed his final two model railroads. He had developed a close friendship with Jim Boyd, who joined Carstens in 1971 and in 1975 became the editor of Railfan & Railroad. It was Koester's exposure to the V&O and eastern mountain coal railroading in the Appalachians that led him to develop the concept of the Allegheny Midland. Blending elements of Nickel Plate and some C&O equipment and operation with Chesapeake & Ohio structures and scenery, the Allegheny Midland became the Nickel Plate's plausible West Virginia coal-hauler. Regular updates in the pages of Railroad Model Craftsman made the Allegheny Midland known to modelers across America and beyond.

Koester left Carstens in 1981 and took a job with Bell Laboratories, editing their publications for two decades. In November 1985, he also began writing a monthly column called "Trains of Thought" in the pages of Model Railroader, published by Kalmbach. In 1995, he became the founding editor of Model Railroad Planning, an annual magazine. After 20 years editing telecommunication journals and the corporate science magazine and anchoring the corporate TV network, Koester retired and took on more work with Kalmbach. He became a contributing editor and continued as the "Trains of Thought" columnist for Model Railroader.

He has written many books for Kalmbach, including

- Realistic Model Railroad Operation (2003)
- Realistic Model Railroad Design (2004)
- Realistic Model Railroad Building Blocks (2005)
- The Model Railroader's Guide to Coal Railroading (2006)
- Planning Scenery for your Model Railroad (2007)
- Designing & Building Multi-Deck Model Railroads (2008)
- The Allegheny Midland: Lessons Learned (2009)
- Model Railroading from Prototype to Layout (2010)
- The Model Railroader's Guide to Mountain Railroading (2011)
- "Allen McClelland and His Virginian & Ohio" (2022)

His latest book, a tribute to the many contributions Allen McClelland and his V&O ("The Man Who Changed Everything") has made to the hobby, will be published in the fall of 2022.

In 2000, the Allegheny Midland was decommissioned, and construction began on a complex multi-deck version of the Nickel Plate's Third Subdivision of the St. Louis Division, also in HO scale. Concentrating on timetable and train-order operations, this layout replicates the Nickel Plate that Koester grew up with in Cayuga.
