= Mark W. Hemphill =

American editor

Mark William Hemphill was the editor of Trains magazine from September 2000 until July 2004. Before that, he served as assistant editor of HyRail Production's CTC Board magazine.

Hemphill attended the University of Illinois Urbana-Champaign and the University of Colorado Denver, earning degrees in history from each.

Hemphill was the first Trains editor to have worked in the railroad industry, having started Mountain Diesel Transportation in Denver with Dale Sanders, also of CTC Board. He later joined the Kansas City Southern Railway in Shreveport, Louisiana, as a train dispatcher.

From 2005 until 2007, Hemphill was the Senior Consultant, Rail, for the Iraq Reconstruction Management Office, an arm of the United States Department of State. In this capacity he assisted the Director General of the Iraqi Republic Railways in the reconstruction of Iraq’s national railroad system.

As of 2011, Hemphill was a director of railroad consulting services for HDR Engineering, Inc. In 2019, Hemphill left HDR to work for Rio Grande Pacific Corporation heading the Uinta Basin Rail construction project.

He is the author of one book, Union Pacific: Salt Lake Route. (Erin [Ontario]: Boston Mills Press, 1995.)
