= Railroad Man =

Railroad Man may refer to:

- Railroad Man's Magazine, a magazine published in 1906
- The Railroad Man, a 1956 Italian film directed by Pietro Germi
- Poppoya, a 1999 Japanese film directed by Yasuo Furuhata
