= Atlantic City Mine Railroad =

The Atlantic City Mine Railroad was a private carrier mine railroad that operated in Wyoming from 1962 until 1983. Owned and operated by U.S. Steel, the railroad extended 76.7 miles from a connection with the Union Pacific Railroad in southwestern Wyoming to an iron ore mine north of Atlantic City, Wyoming. One notable aspect of the railroad was its crossing of the Continental Divide at South Pass, Wyoming. Another was the railroad's use of EMD F7 locomotives, often in A-B-B-B-B-A configurations, painted in U.S. Steel's own yellow and black livery.

== History ==
The railroad's genesis was in the construction of the Geneva Steel mill in Vineyard, Utah during World War II. The federal government backed the construction of the steel mill for national security purposes, reasoning that its location far inland protected it from any Japanese attack on the West Coast. In addition, the plant's location in Utah was relatively close to regions in Utah and Wyoming where iron ore and other materials needed for primary steel making are plentiful.

Initially, Geneva Steel Works drew its raw materials from an iron ore mine at Cedar City, Utah. That mine proved insufficient to keep Geneva Steel Works operating at full capacity, so U.S. Steel sought a secondary source of iron ore. Owing at least in part to a geological report issued jointly by the Geological Survey of Wyoming and the University of Wyoming Natural Resources Research Institute in 1949, U.S. Steel became aware of a large reserve in the Wind River Mountains in Wyoming, north of Atlantic City and south of Lander. The reserve was more than 75 miles away from the Union Pacific Railroad's line in southwestern Wyoming, and it would require a 300-mile trek by rail to bring the iron ore from the reserve to the Geneva Steel Works.

Undaunted by those distances, U.S. Steel in the mid-1950s began planning the creation of the Atlantic City iron ore mine, to be an open-pit mine with on-site agglomeration facilities. The mine was located some 8,300 feet above sea level. Work began in 1960 on the mine complex and the 76.7-mile railroad. The mine and railroad were constructed by contractors J.H. Pomeroy & Co. and Bechtel Corp.

U.S. Steel enlisted the Union Pacific Railroad's civil engineers to design the railroad, which was completed in 1962. The line's construction disproved a theory put forth in the October 1947 issue of Trains magazine that held that no more railroad lines ever would be built to cross the Continental Divide in the Rocky Mountains. The taconite pellet plant began operations in August 1962, with the first shipment departing the site on August 15, 1962.

The line began at a connection with the Union Pacific at Winton Junction, north of Rock Springs, and extended north and then northeast, snaking past the west side of South Pass City and then turning northeast before concluding at the mine. From the mine's loading chute at its north end to the connection with the Union Pacific at Winton, the line descended 1,884 feet in elevation, including dropping 880 feet alone in the first 13 miles between the mine and the Continental Divide at South Pass. Construction of the line required fills as high as 100 feet between the mine and the Sweetwater River. In that segment, grading contractors moved more than 2.5 million cubic yards of material. Below South Pass, civil engineers encountered a peat bog across the route, which was unusual for such an arid climate. The solution was to dig deep under an impervious layer of soil to drain the subgrade.

The railroad's motive power was F7 locomotives that U.S. Steel reallocated from a common carrier railroad in Pennsylvania that the company had owned at that time, the Bessemer & Lake Erie. The railroad initially “leased” the locomotives from the B&LE before purchasing them outright.

The mine operated for three shifts each day — thus never shutting down — and employed 550 employees, and the railroad normally carried a full train out of the mine every other day. At the mine, U.S. Steel extracted a hard, slate-like rock called magnetic taconite, which was only about 30 percent iron. After the taconite was blasted from the pit walls, it was crushed several times and then strong magnets pulled the iron out of the taconite. Then, the concentrated iron ore was agglomerated, which involved mixing the iron ore — which at that point was a cake-like mixture — with bentonite, rolled into marble-sized pellets and heated in an agglomerating furnace at the mine. Finally, the pellets were stored on-site in a building until they were shipped out in 120-car trains. The operation was the highest open pit iron ore mining operation in the U.S.

== Shutdown and reclamation ==
In 1982, America's steel industry was struggling, with far more capacity than demand, which prompted U.S. mills to cut capacity in an effort to reduce expenses. In 1983, U.S. Steel no longer found it financially feasible to continue mining the relatively low-grade iron ore at the Atlantic City mine, which was expensive to operate. U.S. Steel concluded its best option was to shift Geneva Steel's source of taconite pellets from the Atlantic City mine to U.S. Steel's Minntac plant, in Mountain Iron, Minnesota — a plant that had been operating at only 25 percent of its capacity. In Atlantic City, operations at the mine were shut down on October 1, 1983, and the final run of the railroad — to bring the remaining stockpiled ore from the mine to the Union Pacific — took place on October 20, 1983. U.S. Steel officially closed the mine on April 1, 1984.

in 1985, Ohio-based Universal Equipment Co. bought the railroad line and mine site from U.S. Steel. Universal Equipment reportedly had planned to mine the site for road construction materials. However, Universal Equipment ultimately wound up overseeing the salvaging and scrapping of the mine and railroad. The mine and railroad were dismantled in 1985.

Wyoming Highway 28 subsequently was rerouted through the old mine site, and the mine's pits today have become filled with rainwater and melted snow.

Locomotive-wise, the railroad had four F7 A units and four F7 B units. Seven of the railroad's eight locomotives — all except the F7A unit bearing the number 734 — formerly had been on the roster of the Bessemer and Lake Erie, while F7A No. 734 formerly had been a Burlington Northern Railroad locomotive and prior to that had been on the roster of the Northern Pacific Railway. The seven former B&LE units were used for hauling the taconite pellets, while No. 734 was purchased as a parts source and never was used in active ore service. Those seven former B&LE locomotives all went first to the Texas Southern railroad. Three units — 723B, 724B and 726B — eventually were scrapped. Four other locomotives — 712B, 723A, 724A and 726A — found homes elsewhere. 712B, 723A and 724A all later became property of the Washington Central Railroad, while 726A fell into the hands of Passenger & Freight Locomotive in San Antonio. No. 734, the former Burlington Northern unit, was bought by railroad photographer Dale Sanders in September 1983.

== Potential reopening of the mine ==
On numerous occasions over the years, the idea of reopening the Atlantic City Iron Ore Mine has been studied, given worldwide steel demand. In 2012, a consultant hired by the state of Wyoming estimated that 200 million tons of iron ore reserves — which would produce 60 to 66 million tons of iron — remain at the bottom of the lake that sits in the former open pit of the mine.

The reopening of the mine was discussed again in 2014, after the Wyoming Business Council began investigating the feasibility of reopening the mine. Reopening of the mine, whose mineral rights are owned by the J.R. Simplot Company, would entail building a new rail line to transport the ore.
