= Pacific News =

Pacific News may refer to:

- Pacific News Service, a non-profit media organization based in the United States
- Pacific News, the original name of Pacific RailNews, a defunct magazine about railways
- Pacific News (ISSN 1435-8360), the semi-annual publication of the Association of Pacific Studies (Arbeitsgemeinschaft fuer Pazifische Studien e.V., APSA), Hamburg University
