= Railfan & Railroad =

American magazine

- Editor: E. Steven Barry
- Categories: Rail transport
- Frequency: monthly
- Founded: 1974 (including Railroad Magazine, 1906)
- Company: White River Productions
- Country: United States
- Language: English
- Website: www.railfan.com
- ISSN: 0163-7266

Railfan & Railroad is an American monthly magazine that has been in publication since 1974. It was the first magazine title established in-house by Carstens Publications. As a magazine dedicated to trains and rail transportation, it stands out from its main competitor Trains as a publication focused on the enthusiast and related activities. Established as Railfan magazine (ISSN 0098-0714), it merged in 1979 with Railroad magazine, which Carstens purchased at that time. The magazine was renamed Railfan & Railroad, but the two former titles were listed separately on the masthead until 2015. The magazine was acquired by White River Productions in September 2014. The magazine is produced monthly, edited by Steve Barry.

== Founding and early days ==
As early as 1968, future Railroad Model Craftsman editor Tony Koester visited publisher Harold Carstens to pitch an idea for a "railfan's" magazine, at the insistence of his friend Jim Boyd (who was at the time an occasional contributor to RMC). At the time, Carstens cited the lack of potential advertisers and stiff competition from the long-established Trains and Railroad magazines as a reason for not starting the new publication. As a result of that initial meeting, Carstens did make an offer to Koester to join the staff of RMC.

By 1971, Jim Boyd had joined Carstens Publications to work on sister publication Flying Models, and Koester was editor of Railroad Model Craftsman. In the fall of 1974, publisher Hal Carstens had a change of heart given the popular rise of the railroad enthusiast movement, and the increased potential for advertising revenue. He tipped off Boyd and Koester that he intended to produce a quarterly publication, starting with a Winter 1974 issue. The new publication would be known simply as Railfan as an indicator of its intended target market. Within a matter of weeks, Boyd and Koester had produced the first issue of the new magazine.

== Rise in popularity and expansion ==
The 1970s were a period of dynamic change for American railroads, as many were facing bankruptcy in the face of shifting traffic patterns and increased labor and fuel costs. Unprofitable branch lines were abandoned or sold, and many railroad companies sought merger partners in order to avoid bankruptcy. Nowhere was this more apparent than in the industrial Northeast (known colloquially as the "Rust Belt") where competing railroads sought to reduce redundant routes and modernize their physical plants. With this rapid modernization, many historic pieces of vintage railroad equipment were scrapped, though a great many more were saved, thanks to the rise in railfan activity and the development and support of the railway preservation movement. By the mid-1970s, preparations were underway to celebrate the nation's bicentennial, and with it came a renewed interest in railroad heritage, namely the return of several steam locomotives to main line excursion service. Amidst all of this change, Railfan & Railroad not only reported on these activities, but also encouraged them and the "railfan" culture.

Response to the new magazine was favorable, and Railfan went to a bi-monthly schedule starting with the August 1977 issue. Part of the success of the new magazine has been attributed to Boyd's skill as a photographer and writer, as well as his real-world railroading experience and his personality. Upon the purchase of the defunct Railroad, the title was changed to Railfan & Railroad starting with the May 1979 issue. The masthead listed the publication serials of both titles until 2014.

Railfan & Railroad increased production to a monthly schedule starting with the October 1987 issue, and with it, added Mike Del Vecchio as an associate editor. Associate editor Bruce Kelly, whose articles and photography had appeared in various rail publications since 1982, came on board in 1988 to assist with news and caption writing, column editing, map design, and overall production.

More changes came to the magazine staff in the 1990s, first with the departure of Bruce Kelly in 1996. Prolific railroad photographer and New Jersey native Steve Barry replaced Kelly at the same time. Mike Del Vecchio took a position with industry journal Railway Age in 1996, which opened the door for the arrival of Chris Kimmler.

== Post Jim Boyd era ==
Editor Jim Boyd retired in 1998 after 23 years at the helm of the magazine he helped shape, and Steve Barry was promoted to managing editor. In 1999, George Fletcher was added to the masthead as an associate editor, but his tenure was short lived as he accepted a position with the Long Island Rail Road in 2001. Walt Lankenau joined the staff in September 2000 as associate editor, after having previously worked for Carstens Publications as the editor of Creative Crafts & Miniatures in 1984, and later freelancing as a cartographer and books editor. Publisher Hal Carstens died unexpectedly in June 2009, and was succeeded by his son Henry as president of the company.

Incremental changes to update the look and feel of the magazine began in 2010, when a new logo debuted to replace an earlier redesign dating from 1999. At the end of 2010, Editor Emeritus Jim Boyd suffered a heart attack and died near his home in Newton. In 2011, author and photographer Otto Vondrak joined the staff as associate editor after working as a contractor and freelancer for the previous year.

Since its beginning, the editorial style of the magazine tends to be focused on the active enthusiast who is more likely to be engaged in the hobby by taking photographs of current railroad operations, visiting museums and tourist lines, and contributing to historical preservation activities. Topics range from the historic to the contemporary, and includes news photos and monthly columns to balance out the feature content.

The magazine continues its focus on the railroad enthusiast, thanks in part to editor Steve Barry's involvement in the National Railway Historical Society and his enthusiasm for photography. The majority of content is contributed by the readers of the magazine, with the editors appearing as-needed. In December 2011, Railfan & Railroad expanded its reach with the debut of digital editions for home computers, laptops, and select mobile digital devices.

== White River Productions era ==
After years of financial struggle, Carstens Publications president Henry Carstens announced the company's permanent closure on August 22, 2014. On September 1, 2014, White River Productions announced their acquisition of Railfan & Railroad as well as sister publication Railroad Model Craftsman. Eight pages were added to bring the publication up to 70 pages. Steve Barry and Otto Vondrak were retained as the editorial staff. News columnists were moved over from Railroads Illustrated, and the "LocoNotes" diesel roster updates were moved over from Trains & Railroads of the Past. Starting with the January 2017 issue, the magazine once again expanded to 82 pages. Eric Berger was added to the staff as news editor in 2019. Journalist and photographer Justin Franz joined the staff as associate editor in April 2020, and Otto Vondrak was promoted to managing editor (and was also named editor of RMC in 2019).

== Monthly columns ==
A slate of regular contributors author the monthly columns ("Departments") that appear in Railfan & Railroad magazine opposite the feature content.

Departures - This monthly commentary is written by Alexander B. Craghead, and explores the hobby of railfanning from many perspectives as well as celebrating the heritage and future of railroading.

Railnews - Compiled by associate editor Justin Franz with contributions from several regular columnists, Railnews features the month's top stories and photos submitted by readers. Many of the Railnews contributors were transferred from Railroads Illustrated magazine when production shifted from monthly to annual in 2014.

Transit Currents - The roots of this monthly column come from the "Electric Lines" feature edited by Steve Maguire in the old Railroad magazine beginning in 1942. This later became "Transit Topics" in 1955 and was carried over to the combined Railfan & Railroad in 1979. In 1982, the column was renamed "Transit Currents" and was edited by Prof. George M. Smerk until 2016. Bob Gallegos is the current editor, and the column covers commuter rail, rapid transit, and light rail, as well as selected historic trolley operations.

Railfan Timetable - Readers submit their listings of railroad-related events and excursions to this free monthly listing.

Capitol Lines - Veteran CBS reporter Wes Vernon covered railroading and how it was affected by government policy and politics coming out of Washington, D.C. until his retirement in May 2018. Veteran Washington Post journalist and former Trains columnist Don Phillips has since taken over responsibility for the column. This column was retired in 2019.

LocoNotes - LocoNotes is first-hand reports of diesel locomotive locations and dispositions across North America, submitted by readers and compiled by Kenneth Ardinger. This column was retired in 2024.

Camera Bag - Launched by editor Jim Boyd in the first issue, this column features advice specifically useful to all aspects of railfan photography, currently authored by a number of rotating columnists.

Scan Man - Edited by Vincent Reh, "Scan Man" discusses the world of railroad radio technology, and publishes on an alternating schedule with "Preservation Topics." This column was retired in 2021.

On The Menu - On the Menu was a monthly look on the nearly 100 dinner train operations across North America, as well as a fond look back at railroad dining experiences as well as reports on the latest trends, written by James D. Porterfield. As the years went on, the column expanded to include art, literature, and preservation. This column was retired at the end of 2023.

Preservation Topics - A number of rotating columnists explore the world of historic railway preservation, museums, and tourist railroads around the country. Formerly known as "Lineside Legacy" authored by columnist Jeff Terry.

Markers - This column is compiled by the editors to discuss items that do not normally fit the rest of the magazine, and occasionally features guest authors.

Parting Shot - Formerly known as "Final Frame," this is the last page of the magazine where a full-frame vertical format photo is featured. The title was adopted from Railroads Illustrated magazine.

== See also ==
- Railroad-related periodicals
