= Al C. Kalmbach =

American businessman

Al C. Kalmbach

Al C. Kalmbach (June 25, 1910 – October 14, 1981) was the founder of Kalmbach Publishing, a publisher of magazines and books geared towards enthusiasts of several different hobbies.

Albert Carpenter Kalmbach was born in Sturgeon Bay, Wisconsin. He grew up in Milwaukee, not far from the shops of the Milwaukee Road.

He was ambitious from an early age. At 12 he spent some of his savings to buy a small hand-operated printing press. He would publish the Milwaukee Sun, a neighbourhood paper, until he enrolled in Marquette University. In 1932, after graduation, he had a job offer working on the Pennsylvania Railroad's electrification project, but the job fell through due to the Great Depression. He started a new printing company, The Milwaukee Commercial Press, which specialized in church newspapers, besides commercial job printing.

His interest in railroads began during his early life in Sturgeon Bay. The rail line that served his relative's business (Fidler-Skilling Fuel & Dock) was the Ahnapee and Western Railway which ran through Door and Kewaunee counties.. His interest in model railroads came from helping his friend Frank P. Zeidler (later mayor of Milwaukee) with electrical problems on the O gauge layout Zeidler was building. Al was hooked and began construction in 1928 of his own layout, the Great Gulch, Yahoo Valley & Northern, in his parents' attic. In the winter of 1932-33 he helped to organize the Model Railroad Club of Milwaukee.

Kalmbach, seeing the interest people had in the operating O Scale layouts at the 1933 Chicago Century of Progress Exposition, turned to one of his lifelong loves — railroads — for the topic of his first magazine. The Model Railroader began publication in the summer of 1933, the first issue dated January 1934. A press release announcing the magazine appeared in August 1933, but did not receive much interest. The bank refused to loan Kalmbach any money, many felt sorry for him, and a few told him he was crazy.

His first wife, Bernice, herself a journalist, encouraged and helped Al put The Model Railroader together. They figured it would be a sideline business from their commercial printing operations. Soon they were devoted seven days a week to the venture.

The magazine was well received by model railroaders, and the young publisher carried the entire press run (272 copies) by streetcar to be mailed. By July paid circulation exceeded a thousand copies. Growth continued, but the magazine was not a big success. Model Railroader (Kalmbach eventually dropped its definite article) became profitable after three years. It took Kalmbach seven years to pay off the loans used to launch the magazine.

Al Kalmbach did much to popularize the hobby. His main interest was operation. He enjoyed being the dispatcher at the Model Railroad Club of Milwaukee, and published many articles on operation. He also wrote a book, How to Run a Model Railroad, under the name Boomer Pete.

Kalmbach was a driving force in bringing model railroaders from across the US and Canada to Milwaukee for the founding convention of the National Model Railroad Association in September 1935. Model Railroader (MR) would serve as the official publication of the NMRA in the early years. For his efforts he was awarded Honorary Life Member No. 1, and received the NMRA's 30th anniversary award.

In 1940, business was good enough for Kalmbach to launch another magazine about railroads in general with the simple title of Trains. From its first issue dated November 1940, it grew quickly from an initial circulation of just over 5,000. Trains reflected Kalmbach's interest in prototype railroading. Both magazines remain the flagships of the company, which has since expanded to include a portfolio of more than a dozen magazines, hundreds of books, and many videos.

World War II introduced paper rationing, which impacted the growth of the Kalmbach Publishing Company. At the end of the war, MR circulation was about 20,000. By 1950, MR circulation had grown to more than 100,000, thanks in part to a boom in interest in model railroading.

Kalmbach was a tireless promoter of the hobby of model railroading. In 1949 Kalmbach Publishing launched a national ad campaign promoting the hobby to the general public. Ads were placed in major publications, with a circulation of 42 million. During 1952–53, Kalmbach was president of the Hobby Industry Association of America.

Kalmbach was an early booster and benefactor of the National Model Railroad Association (NMRA). One tribute to him was the NMRA naming their research library the A. C. Kalmbach Memorial Library, which was located in the NMRA headquarters in Chattanooga, Tennessee (now closed).

Kalmbach died in 1981 of Parkinson's disease.

== Sources ==
- "A. C. Kalmbach, 1910-1981". Model Railroader Magazine. January 1982. pp. 80–81.
