= Arch Whitehouse =

World War I veteran and author

Arthur George Joseph Whitehouse
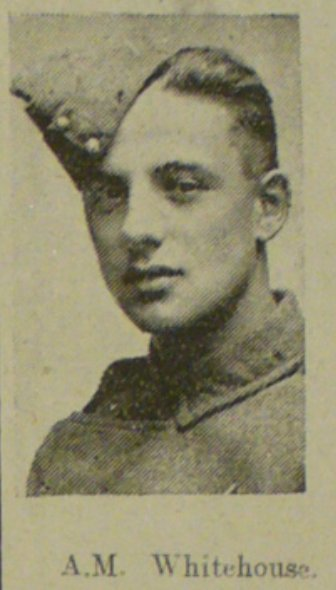
- Born: 11 December 1895; Northampton, England
- Died: 15 November 1979 (aged 83); Montvale, New Jersey, United States
- Military career
- Allegiance: United Kingdom
- Branch: British Army; Royal Air Force
- Service years: 1915–1919
- Rank: Second Lieutenant
- Nickname: "Arch"
- Unit: No. 22 Squadron RAF
- Conflicts: First World War
- Awards: Military Medal
- Other work: Author, writer, historian, novelist

Arthur George Joseph "Arch" Whitehouse, MM (11 December 1895 – 15 November 1979) was a British First World War veteran, a prolific pulp writer of aviation stories, and an author of First World War aviation books.

== First World War ==
Arthur George Joseph Whitehouse was born in England, but lived in Montvale, New Jersey, United States. At the outbreak of the First World War, Whitehouse came to England and enlisted as a private with the Northamptonshire Yeomanry and given the service number 1784. He later transferred to the Royal Flying Corps, with the service number 78563.

Whitehouse was an air mechanic 1st class and observer with the No. 22 Squadron RAF. On 13 April 1917 Whitehouse and his pilot Bush were brought down by anti-aircraft fire; Whitehouse believed afterward that the Red Baron mistakenly listed Whitehouse/Bush among the Barons's "credits"-although this was not so. For taking part in shooting down German aircraft and airplane raiding missions, he was awarded the Military Medal in November 1917. Towards the end of the war he was undergoing training in England as a pilot in Sopwith Camels. On 28 September 1919, as a second lieutenant, he was transferred to the Unemployed List. A notation on his Medal card noted he was awarded the British War Medal and Victory Medal.
Contrary to reports that he brought down 16 enemy aircraft and 6 balloons, Whitehouse was never an ace, although he took part in the shooting down of four enemy aircraft:

- 12 August 1917 – an Albatross DV (burned), with pilot James Bush (RFC officer) M.C. {1/3 credit share in shootdown with two other pilots/observers}
- 12 August 1917 – an Albatross DV (out of control), with pilot James Bush (RFC officer) M.C. {1/2 credit in shootdown with another pilot/observer}
- 2 October 1917 – a "Two seater" (destroyed), with pilot James Bush (RFC officer) M.C.
- 10 October 1917 – a Albatross DV (destroyed over Moorslede, Belgium), with pilot William Meggitt, M.C.

Both Bush and Meggit were aces, with 6 credits.

== Author ==
"Arch" Whitehouse was a writer postwar for magazines such as Flying Aces on First World War aviation, creating characters like The Griffon, Coffin Kirk, and others.

In the 1960s, he wrote a wide range of books, both fiction and non-fiction on aviation and similar military topics.

More recently, some of his pulp fiction have been reprinted by several publishers, including Altus Press.

== Books ==
=== Autobiography ===
- Hell in the Heavens: The Adventures of an Aerial Gunner in the Royal Flying Corps (W. & R. Chambers [UK], 1938)
- The Fledgling: An Aerial Gunner in World War I (NY: Duell, Sloan & Pearce, 1964)

=== Biography ===
- Billy Mitchell: America's Eagle of Air Power (NY: G. P. Putnam's Sons, 1962)
- John J. Pershing (G. P. Putnam's Sons, 1964)
- Hun Killer (Award Books, 1966)

=== Other nonfiction ===
- How to Build and Fly a Glider (Magazine Publishers, Inc., 1929)
- Wings of Adventure (John Hamilton [UK], 1936)
- Hell in Helmets (Norwich, England: Jarrolds, 1940)
- The Real Book About Airplanes (Garden City, NJ: Garden City Books, 1952)
- Fighters in the Sky (Duell, Sloan & Pearce, 1959)
- The Years of the Sky Kings (Doubleday, 1959)
- Tank: The Story of Their Battles and the Men Who Drove Them from Their First Use in World War I to Korea (Curtis Books, 1960)
- The Years of the War Birds (Doubleday, 1960)
- Subs and Submariners (Curtis Books, 1961)
- Action in the Sky (Duell, Sloan & Pearce, 1962)
- Legion of the Lafayette (Doubleday, 1962)
- Squadrons of the Sea: The History of Aircraft Carrier Operations (Doubleday, 1962)
- The Real Book of Aircraft (London: Dennis Dobson, 1962)
- Amphibious Operations (Doubleday, 1963)
- Decisive Air Battles of the First World War (Duell, Sloan & Pearce, 1963)
- Epics and Legends of the First World War (Frederick Muller [UK], 1964)
- Espionage and Counterespionage: Adventures in Military Intelligence (Doubleday, 1964)
- Heroes and Legends of World War I (Doubleday, 1964)
- Heroic Pigeons (G. P. Putnam's Sons, 1965)
- The Early Birds: The Wonders and Heroics of the First Decades of Flight (Doubleday, 1965)
- Fighters in the Sky (Nova, 1966)
- Fighting Wings: Aerial Combat in World War I (Duell, Sloan & Pearce, 1966)
- The Zeppelin Fighters (Doubleday, 1966)
- Fighting Ships: The Development and History of Modern Warships (Doubleday, 1967)
- Heroes of the Sunlit Sky (Doubleday, 1967)
- The Military Airplane: Its History and Development (Doubleday, 1971)
- The Sky's the Limit: A History of US Airlines (Macmillan, 1971)

=== Novels ===
- Crime on a Convoy Carrier (The World's Work [UK], 1943)
- Squadron Forty-Four (Doubleday, 1965)
- Scarlet Streamers (G. P. Putnam's Sons, 1967)
- Squadron Shilling (Doubleday, 1968)
- The Laughing Falcon: A Story of the Lafayette Escadrille (G. P. Putnam's Sons, 1969)
- Playboy Squadron (Curtis Books, 1970)
- The Casket Crew (Doubleday, 1971)
- Hero Without Honor (Doubleday, 1972)
- Wings for the Chariots (Doubleday, 1973)

=== Story collections ===
- Bombers in the Sky (Duell, Sloan & Pearce, 1960)
- Adventure in the Sky (Duell, Sloan & Pearce, 1961)
- Combat in the Sky (Duell, Sloan & Pearce, 1961)
- The Complete Adventures of the Griffon: Volume 1 (Altus Press, 2010)
- The Complete Adventures of the Griffon: Volume 2 (Altus Press, 2012)
- The Adventures of Coffin Kirk (Age of Aces, 2013)
- The Complete Adventures of the Griffon: Volume 3 (Altus Press, 2016)
- The Complete Adventures of the Griffon: Volume 4 (Altus Press, 2023)
- The Casket Crew (Age of Aces, 2024)
