= Mike Schafer (author) =

American writer and editor

Michael Schafer
- Born: January 12, 1949 (age 77)
- Occupation: Writer

Mike Schafer (born January 12, 1949) is an American writer of books on railroading. He contributed to The Complete Book of North American Railroading.

In 1969, he co-founded the North Western Illinois Chapter of the National Railway Historical Society.

Schafer was the editor of Passenger Train Journal from 1983 to 1990 and again from 2006 to 2022.

== Published works ==
=== Sole writer ===
- Classic Articles from Model Railroader. Milwaukee, WI: Kalmbach. 1980. ISBN 978-0-8902-4545-3. OCLC 872541655.
- Passenger Train Annual, 1988. Glendale, CA: Interurban Press, Trans-Anglo Books. 1988. ISBN 978-0-9163-7483-9. OCLC 53008522.
- All Aboard Amtrak : 1971–1991. Piscataway, NJ: Railpace Co. 1991. ISBN 978-0-9621-5414-0. OCLC 24545029.
- Classic American Railroads (1st ed.). Osceola, WI: Motorbooks International. 1996. ISBN 978-0-7603-0239-2. OCLC 35033722.
- Caboose. Osceola, WI: MBI Publishing Co. 1997. ISBN 978-0-7603-0376-4. OCLC 830885295.
- Vintage Diesel Locomotives. Osceola, WI: Motorbooks International. 1998. ISBN 978-0-7603-0507-2. OCLC 38738930.
- Streamliner Memories. Osceola, WI: MBI Publishing Company. 1999. ISBN 978-0-7603-0619-2. OCLC 40417819.
- More Classic American Railroads. Osceola, WI: Motorbooks International. 2000. ISBN 978-0-7603-0758-8. OCLC 44089438.
- The American Passenger Train. Osceola, WI: MBI Publishing Company. 2001. ISBN 978-0-7603-0896-7. OCLC 473788543.
- The Railroad Caboose. St. Paul, MN: MBI Publishing Co. 2002. ISBN 978-0-7603-1379-4. OCLC 143168163.
- Classic American Railroads : Volume III. St. Paul, MN: MBI Publishing Company. 2003. ISBN 978-0-7603-1649-8. OCLC 842748473.

=== Co-writer ===
- Schafer, Mike; Welsh, Joe (1997). Classic American Streamliners. Osceola, WI: Motorbooks International. ISBN 978-0-7603-0377-1. OCLC 37281634.
- Schafer, Mike; McBride, Mike (1999). Freight Train Cars. Osceola, WI: MBI Publishing Co. ISBN 978-0-7603-0612-3. OCLC 830915307.
- Schafer, Mike; Welsh, Joe (2003). Streamliners : History of a Railroad Icon. St. Paul, MN: Motorbooks International. ISBN 978-0-7603-1841-6. OCLC 698365774.
- Schafer, Mike; Solomon, Brian (2009). Pennsylvania Railroad. Minneapolis, MN: Voyageur Press. ISBN 978-0-7603-2930-6. OCLC 234257275.
- Schafer, Mike; Landis, Brian (2010). Rockford Area Railroads. Charleston, SC: Arcadia Publishing. OCLC 700943139.
- Schafer, Mike; Landis, Brian (2015). Rockford & Interurban Railway. Charleston, SC: Arcadia Publishing. ISBN 978-1-4396-5052-3. OCLC 936620665.

=== Magazine articles ===
- "Another New Route for the CZ?". Passenger Train Journal: 9–13. March 1987. OCLC 15273139.
- "Passenger Train Collisions: The Tally Grows Again". Passenger Train Journal. 19 (6): 11–13. June 1988. OCLC 18123117.
- "Jim Boyd: A Legacy (1941–2010)". Railfan & Railroad. 31 (3): 34–39. March 2012. OCLC 778802453.
- "Harmony along the Hudson". Passenger Train Journal. 35 (3): 24–35. 2012. OCLC 811858901.
- "Off the Beaten Path". Railfan & Railroad. 35 (4): 38–45. April 2016. OCLC 945618339.
- "A SunRail Synopsis". Passenger Train Journal. 41 (1): 50–51. 2017. OCLC 972731644.

== See also ==
- List of American writers
