= Freeman H. Hubbard =

American magazine editor (1894–1981)

Freeman H. Hubbard (April 21, 1894 – August 1981) was an American writer known for his articles and books about railroads. He was editor of Railroad Magazine for 42 years, from 1930 until its demise in 1979, with seven years away while he worked as a freelance writer from 1946 to 1953. The magazine was named Railroad Man's Magazine in 1930, when Hubbard succeeded editor William Edward Hayes, being renamed Railroad Stories in 1932 and, finally, Railroad Magazine in 1937. He wrote widely about railroad history, legend and lore, including famous personalities such as Casey Jones, John Henry, Jesse James and Kate Shelley. He was Secretary of the American Association of Cartoonists and Caricaturists. He was born "at the end of a Philadelphia street car line" and died in New York City. His wife's name was Naomi Critchett Hubbard.

== Selected works ==
- Encyclopedia of North American Railroading: 150 Years of Railroading in the United States and Canada. (1981)
- Great Days of the Circus. With Leonard V. Farley. (1962)
- Great Trains of All Time. Illustrated by Herb Mott. (1962)
- Railroad avenue: Great Stories and Legends of American Railroading. (1945)
- Roundhouse Cat and Other Railroad Animals. Illustrated by Kurt Wiese. (1951)
- The Railroad Caboose: Its 100-year History, Legend, and Lore. With William F. Knapke. (1968)
- The Train That Never Came Back, and Other Railroad Stories. Illustrated by Kurt Wiese. (1952) Later republished in an abridged form as The Phantom Brakeman and Other Railroad Stories by Scholastic Book Services. (1966)
- Vinnie Ream and Mr. Lincoln. (1949)
