= Harold H. Carstens =

American publisher

Harold H. Carstens (June 20, 1925 – June 23, 2009) was president of Carstens Publications, publisher of Railfan & Railroad and Railroad Model Craftsman magazines. While attending Fairleigh Dickinson University at night, Carstens joined the staff of Railroad Model Craftsman in 1952. While in the Army, he studied art and journalism at the Philippine Institute for the Armed Forces. The position of managing editor opened up in 1954, and Carstens later advanced to Editor and Vice President in 1957. When owner Charles Penn retired in 1962, Hal Carstens became president. In 1973, Carstens moved the company to a new facility in Newton, New Jersey, where it remained until the magazines were acquired by White River Productions in September 2014.

Carstens was an accomplished author and photographer, with many articles to his name in various hobby and trade journals. He was also the author and editor of several books on model railroading and toy trains. He was also president of several rail-oriented organizations, including Hobbies Industries of America and the Model Railroad Industry Association.
