= Flying Aces (magazine) =

US pulp magazine, 1928–1945

- July 1943 cover of Flying Aces
- Former editors: Harold Goldsmith; Helen Wisner; Neil Coward; Herb Powell
- Staff writers: Donald E. Keyhoe; Joe Archibald; Arch Whitehouse
- Categories: Pulp magazine
- Frequency: Monthly
- Publisher: Periodical House, Inc.
- First issue: October 1928
- Final issue: April 1945

Flying Aces was a monthly American periodical of short stories about aviation, one of a number of so-called "flying pulp" magazines popular during the 1920s and 1930s. Like other pulp magazines, it was a collection of adventure stories, originally printed on coarse, pulpy paper but later moved to a slick format. The magazine was launched in October 1928 by Periodical House, Inc. It featured stories written and illustrated by known authors of the day, often set against the background of World War I. Later issues added non-fiction aviation articles, as well as articles and plans for model airplanes. The latter became more prominent, and eventually the magazine was renamed Flying Models, and catered exclusively to aeromodeling hobbyists.

== Historical context ==
The period from the late 1920s through the 1930s is considered the heyday of pulp fiction, and pulps were at the peak of their popularity. Over 200 magazines were published monthly, reaching an audience of 10 million readers, with the most successful titles selling up to a million copies per issue. Pulp fiction publishers employed unprecedented levels of market segmentation for their titles, exploring every popular category, including love stories, western stories, detective stories, and mystery stories. Publications were highly specialized, with each category having its own set of magazines, readers, and reader expectations.

This period also coincided with the golden days of aviation, highlighted by feats such as Lindbergh's solo flight across the Atlantic and the first extensive use of airplanes in combat in World War I. Pulp publishers sought to capitalize on public interest in flying, which was influenced by stories of World War I flying aces, particularly Eddie Rickenbacker’s memoirs, Fighting the Flying Circus, and Elliot Spring's book on World War I combat flying, Nocturne Militaire. The revived interest in these stories was also due to films such as the 1927 release of Wings and Howard Hughes' 1930 production of Hell's Angels, an epic, mega-budget movie featuring more than 100 pilots and dozens of planes, glorifying World War I American air aces. The movie led to numerous similar films, and a plethora of aviation-oriented pulp magazines followed.

== Content ==
The magazine’s genre was air adventure stories, some set against a war background, written by well-known authors such as Lester Dent, Donald E. Keyhoe, Joe Archibald, and Arch Whitehouse. With the exception of Keyhoe and Whitehouse, who were with the RAF in World War I, the authors had no personal knowledge of flying. The cover art featured dramatic air battle scenes painted by notable commercial artists of the day, such as Alex Schomburg.

=== Kerry Keene/The Griffon ===
44 Griffon stories were published between 1935 and 1942. Altus Press reprinted some of them in 2010.

== Publication history ==
The magazine was launched in October 1928 by Periodical House, Inc. It was initially published in a 7x10” format, with more than 100 pages per issue, and sold for 15 cents per copy. In November 1933, the magazine moved to the so-called "slick" format — an 8½x10" format printed on glossy paper and began featuring full-sized plans for model airplanes in every issue. Issue size was reduced to 74 pages. The magazine was published on a monthly basis. In addition to adventure stories, non-fiction aviation articles and aviation news were added, as were modeling articles. The magazine's tagline became "Fiction, Model Building, Fact — Three Aviation Magazines in One."

== Impact and historical significance ==
Many American pilots who took part in World War II grew up during the 1930s enthusiastically reading flying pulps such as Flying Aces, and were captivated by the adventure stories, an experience that no doubt played a part in their decision to become military aviators themselves. Joseph W. Rutter, a pilot in the Army Air Force in 1944, recalls this vividly in his book Wreaking Havoc: A Year in an A-20, as does First Blue, the biography of Roy Marlin Voris, World War II ace and two-time commander of the Blue Angels.

Many have noted the uncannily accurate way that stories in Flying Aces predicted the Japanese attack on Pearl Harbor as well as the locations of other air battles of the Pacific Theater.

== Fan club ==
In addition to the magazine, the publishers created a fan club for readers. Members were organized into regional "squadrons," and were offered flying-themed stationery, stickers, and even uniforms mimicking those in use by the United States Army Air Forces. The club arranged meetings between readers and notable military and commercial pilots, both American and foreign. Some of the "squadrons" originated by the magazine have lived on, as clubs for modeling enthusiasts. The Flying Aces Club, a model airplane club dedicated to free-flight models, takes its name from the magazine and its old clubs. A Flying Aces Club squadron in Connecticut has named its airstrip 'Pinkham Field' in honor of the fictional Phineas Pinkham.

== Bibliography ==
- Aviation's Great Recruiter, Herm L. Schreiner, Kent State University Press, 2005
- Harlan Ellison: The Edge of Forever, Ellen Weil, Gary K. Wolfe, Ohio State University Press, 2001
- Science-Fiction: The Gernsback Years : A Complete Coverage of the Genre Magazines ... From 1926 Through 1936, Everett Franklin Bleiler, Richard Bleiler, Kent State University Press, 1998
- Sports in the Pulp Magazines, John A. Dinan, McFarland, 1998
- Yesterday's Faces: Glory figures, Robert Sampson, Popular Press, 1983
- American Aviation Historical Society journal, v14-15, 1969, American Aviation Historical Society
- Wreaking Havoc: A Year in an A-20, Joseph W. Rutter, Texas A&M University Press, 2003
- Reflections of Pearl Harbor, K. D. Richardson, Praeger Publishers, 2005
