= Railroad Magazine =

- Editor: Freeman Hubbard
- Categories: Rail transport
- Frequency: Monthly
- Founded: 1906
- Final issue: January 1979; Merged with Railfan Magazine
- Company: Popular Publications International
- Country: United States
- Based in: New York City
- ISSN: 0033-8761

Railroad Magazine was a pulp magazine founded by Frank Anderson Munsey and published October 1906 to January 1979. It was the first specialized pulp magazine with stories and articles about railroads. The magazine merged with Railfan to form the new Railfan & Railroad, published by Carstens Publications beginning after the final Railroad issue in 1979.

== Early years and development ==
Frank Munsey (b. Maine, 1854) moved to New York City in 1892, where he authored a few books and published periodicals and newspapers in many cities. At the time that Munsey founded The Railroad Man's Magazine, the first offices were located in the Flatiron Building in New York City and there was no organized railroad enthusiast movement. Initially the magazine was targeted towards railroaders and retirees. Fictionalized stories of working on the railroad became the cornerstone of the new magazine, along with profiles of current and historic railroad operations around the country. As a boy, the author H.P. Lovecraft is known to have read the entire run of the magazine, from cover to cover.

The magazine was published under different names and formats throughout its history. In 1919, it merged with Argosy which became Argosy and Railroad Man's Magazine for a brief period before reverting to Argosy, thus killing Railroad Man's Magazine. In 1925, magazine founder Frank Munsey had died, leaving a $25 million gift to the Metropolitan Museum of Art.

In 1929, when freelance author William Edward Hayes announced he was bringing out a new railroad-oriented pulp, the Munsey Company recruited him to edit a revival of Railroad Man's Magazine. Upon the abrupt departure of the editor in chief in 1930, Freeman H. Hubbard took over the post, yet was uncredited on the masthead for many years. In 1932, the title was simplified to Railroad Stories, then changed to Railroad Magazine in 1937. Through the 1930s, the magazine helped grow the organized railfan movement by encouraging communication between enthusiasts, organizing special "fan trip" excursions with the railroads, and reporting on the activities of various clubs and museums around the country.

== Popular Publications era ==
After December 1942, Railroad Magazine was published by Popular Publications, which purchased the Munsey Company. It dropped railroad fiction after January 1979. At mid-century, the magazine staff consisted of editor Henry B. Comstock, associate editors K.M. Campbell and Ted Sanchargin, art editor George H. Mabie, and "Electric Lines" editor Stephen B. Maguire.

By the 1970s, the magazine staff consisted of editor Freeman Hubbard, associate editor Gordon T. Wilbur, assistant editor Nancy Nicolelis, "Steam Locomotives" editor Michael A. Eagleson, "Diesel Locomotives" editor Jim Edmonston, "Transit Topics" editor Steve Maguire, "Passenger Trains" editor Ramona K. McGuire, "Technical Editor" Sy Reich, and "Information Booth" editor Barbara Kreimer (although, in truth, Kreimer had left the publication long before, her column featuring a dated photo of her). By this time, the magazine was known more for its photos featuring conveniently-posed attractive women around trains than any editorial content.

== Decline and acquisition by Carstens Publications ==
After years of declining revenue and readership, the magazine abruptly ceased publication with the January 1979 edition, with no mention of the situation. In a deal worked out with Carstens Publications, the venerable title would be merged with their Railfan magazine, and existing subscribers would have their obligation fulfilled with the new title. For the first few years, Steve Maguire continued his "Transit Topics" column, as did Mike Eagleson with "In Search of Steam."

The combined publication continued as a part of Railfan & Railroad until 2015. Railroad Magazine is no longer listed in the masthead of the combined publication. As successor, White River Productions retains the copyright on all Railroad Magazine content and trademarks.

== Modern reprints ==
In 2015, Bold Venture Press began issuing authorized reprints of stories selected from Railroad Stories. These editions collect stories according to themes such as authors, series characters, or serialized novels. These volumes also reprint illustrated features such as Joe Easley's "Along the Iron Pike" and Stookie Allen's "Who's Who in the Crew".

The copyright for all Railroad Magazine content remains with Railfan & Railroad publisher White River Productions.
