= Model Railroader =

American rail transport magazine

- Cover of the June 2024 issue
- Editor: Eric While (as of 5/11/22)
- Categories: Rail transport modeling
- Frequency: Monthly
- Publisher: Firecrown Media
- Total circulation: 138,034 (2011)
- First issue: 1934
- Country: USA
- Website: mrr.trains.com
- ISSN: 0026-7341

Model Railroader (MR) is an American magazine about the hobby of model railroading. Founded in 1934 by Al C. Kalmbach, it is published monthly by Firecrown Media of Chattanooga, Tennessee. Commonly found on newsstands and in libraries, it promotes itself as the oldest magazine of its type in the United States, although it is the long-standing competitor to Railroad Model Craftsman, which - originally named The Model Craftsman - predates MR by one year.

MR is considered to be a general-interest hobby magazine, appealing to a wide range of hobbyists, rather than specializing in a particular scale, or facet of the hobby (such as prototype operations or scratch building and kitbashing). Model Railroader covers a variety of scales and modeling techniques for engines, rolling stock, right-of-way, structures, and scenery. It reviews products including ready-to-run models as well as kits, tools and supplies. The magazine presents blueprints and photographs of prototype equipment, as well as photographs of models and layouts.

A longstanding philosophy of modeling is manifest in its editorial features of layout design and operation, in which the model is viewed as a three-dimensional and temporal compression of the real world, so that, for example, the motive power, freight, trackage and scenery of a real-world railroad are formed into a layout which captures the spirit of not only the equipment and region of the railroad but also its purpose and how it operates.

== History ==
The Model Railroader began publication in the summer of 1933, with a cover date of January 1934. A press release announcing the magazine appeared in August 1933, but did not receive much interest. The bank refused to loan Kalmbach any money, many felt sorry for him, and a few told him he was crazy.

His first wife, Bernice, herself a journalist, encouraged and helped Al put The Model Railroader together. Though they originally saw it as a sideline business to their commercial printing operations, soon they were devoting seven days a week to the venture.

The magazine was well received by model railroaders, and the young publisher carried the entire first press run (272 copies) by streetcar to be mailed. By July 1934, paid circulation exceeded 1,000 copies. Growth continued, but the magazine was not an immediate success. The magazine became profitable after three years. It took Kalmbach seven years to pay off the loans used to launch the magazine.

World War II introduced paper rationing, which dampened the growth of the Kalmbach Publishing Company. At the end of the war, MR's circulation was 18,000. 1949, MR's circulation had grown to 82,000. 1950, MR's circulation had grown to 104,000, thanks in part to a boom in interest in model railroading. As of 2007, the magazine had a monthly paid circulation of more than 160,000. 2017 the year's final issue garnered a reported circulation figure that fell below 100,000.

The magazine, and Kalmbach Publishing (later Kalmbach Media), celebrated its 85th anniversary in 2019.

The magazine had to relocate 4 times, the original location was on 545 S. 84th Street (now a car wash) and later relocated to 1027 N. 7th Street (now part of Milwaukee Public Television and Milwaukee Area Technical College), from 1989 to 2024, they moved to 21027 Crossroads Circle in nearby Waukesha and in 2024, Kalmbach recently sold their building to Silgan Containers and the staff moving to nearby Brookfield, Wisconsin.

Another thing Model Railroader had was their own model railroad layout, the Milwaukee, Racine and Troy, which was located on the second floor of the Kalmbach Media offices in Waukesha (the original was located on the 3rd floor of the old offices at 1027 N. 7th Street which was in operation from 1975 to 1989).

In May 2024, longtime publisher Kalmbach Media divested of Model Railroader and other railroad interest magazines to publisher Firecrown Media. The Milwaukee, Racine and Troy model railroad was demolished when Kalmbach sold their building at 21027 Crossroads Circle and moved to Brookfield, Wisconsin, following the magazine's purchase by Firecrown media.

== Features ==
Typical feature articles in each month's issue include:

- Layout tours - A layout story with a detailed track plan and behind-the-scenes modeling and construction tips.
- How-to projects - Tips and techniques for modeling scenery, structures, rolling stock, and electronics.
- Prototype information - Detailed drawings historical and technical information on how real railroads and lineside industries function.
- Track plans - Sample designs for model railroads the average hobbyist could build.

Regular monthly columns and departments include:

- News and Products - Quick looks at new products available in the hobby.
- Railway Post Office - Letters from readers.
- Step-by-Step - Tackles a different project each month to help you build a better layout.
- Ask MR - Q&A about prototype railroading and model railroading. Also includes tips by readers. This department was created by merging workshop and Information Desk.
- DCC Corner - Get to know model train operation using Digital Command Control.
- Product reviews - A look at new models on the market and how well they perform.
- Trackside Photos - Inspirational photos featuring the work of fellow hobbyists.
- Trains of Thought - Every month model railroad expert Tony Koester looks at the philosophical side of model railroading.
- On Operation - How to reproduce prototype operations on a model railroad.
- N Scale Insight - From March 2011, former editor Jim Kelly began a column looking at N scale modelling.

== Special issues and other media ==
Model Railroader publishes two annual special issues:

- Great Model Railroads showcases 10-12 spectacular model railroads, including large, inspirational photographs, detailed track plans, and how-to information.
- Model Railroad Planning deals with aspects of designing and constructing a model railroad. Typical articles focus on reproducing prototype track arrangements, overcoming modeling obstacles, and researching prototype railroads.

Other special issues on various aspects of the hobby are released on an irregular basis. Titles have included 102 Track Plans for Model Railroaders, How to Build Realistic Layouts, and How to Build More Layout in Less Space.

A bi-monthly web video show, Modeler's Spotlight Video - Inside Cody's Office, is available to magazine subscribers via MR's website. The show introduces new products, offers modeling tips, and a viewer mail segment (along with the occasional blooper at the end).

Many of the blueprints, layout plans, articles on operation and signaling, and methods of construction of bridges, structures and scenery are also collected in books published by Kalmbach Books. These are useful to modelers in general, railroad historians, and are valuable references on the steam and diesel eras.

Past MR articles are also collected in PDF form and distributed via the magazine's website and available through their digital archive.

Model Railroader staff members participated in the production of the Dream-Plan-Build video series, which was offered by subscription. The DVDs focused on prototype railroading information, layout visits, and modeling techniques.

Model Railroader also produced Model Railroader Video Plus (MRVP) which does layout tours, tips and tricks, and shows like: Cody's Workshop with Cody Grivno, Drew's Trackside Adventures with Drew Halverson, Off The Rails with Gerry Leone, Ask MRVP with David Popp (now called Ask Trains), Let's Make a Scene with Kathy Millatt, It's My Railroad with Steve Brown, Rehab My Railroad, History According to Hediger with Jim Hediger, The Hills Line with James McNabb, Tuck's Toy Trains with John Truckenbrod and many more. MRVP made its debut back in 2013 and is available to magazine subscribers as part of trains.com.

== Cultural impact ==
The model train hobbyists the magazine has profiled over the years include a number of celebrities, including Michael Gross and Rod Stewart.

Model Railroader also has several other "sister" magazines, also published by Firecrown, including such titles as Trains magazine, Classic Trains, Garden Railways, and Classic Toy Trains. They are often advertised in Model Railroader, and on occasion, an article will refer to these other magazines.

== See also ==
- List of railroad-related periodicals
