= James Bush (RFC officer) =

James Cromwell Bush
- Born: 1 March 1891; Salisbury, Wiltshire, England
- Died: 7 October 1917 (aged 26) near Kruikshoek, Belgium
- Burial place: Neuville-en-Ferrain Communal Cemetery, Nord, France
- Military career
- Allegiance: United Kingdom
- Branch: British Army, Royal Flying Corps
- Service years: 1914–1917
- Rank: Lieutenant
- Units: The Duke of Edinburgh's (Wiltshire Regiment); Dorset Regiment; No. 22 Squadron RFC
- Conflicts: World War I
- Awards: Military Cross

Lieutenant James Cromwell Bush MC (1 March 1891 – 7 October 1917) was a British World War I flying ace credited with six aerial victories.

== Biography ==
Bush was born in Salisbury, the eldest son of the Reverend Herbert Cromwell Bush, vicar of Seend, Wiltshire, and a grandson of General Reynell Taylor. He was a descendant of the regicide Oliver Cromwell. After attending Fritham and St. Edward's Schools, he spent some time in Ceylon and India.

He was commissioned into the 5th (Service) Battalion, The Duke of Edinburgh's (Wiltshire Regiment) as a temporary second lieutenant on 22 September 1914. Sent to Gallipoli in 1915, Bush was of the few survivors of his battalion from Suvla Bay, afterwards receiving a mention in despatches from General Sir Ian Hamilton, and also the award of the Military Cross.

Bush was invalided home in late 1915. On 25 February 1916 he was appointed an aide-de-camp, transferred to the General List, and sent to Egypt. On 22 August 1916 he was replaced as ADC, and 18 December 1916 was commissioned into the Dorset Regiment with the rank of lieutenant. On 24 April 1917 Bush was seconded to the Royal Flying Corps.

He was posted to 22 Squadron as a pilot of a two-seater Bristol F.2 Fighter. For his first two victories on 12 August 1917, he teamed with Carleton Clement to set one Albatros D.V aflame and send another down out of control. He went to score four more triumphs, the final one coming on 2 October 1917 (For three-but not his final flight-his observer was Arch Whitehouse). Five days later, he and his observer fell under the guns of German ace Hans von Häbler. Initially reported missing, he was confirmed as dead by a message dropped from a German aircraft.

He is commemorated on the War Memorial at Neuville-en-Ferrain Communal Cemetery.

== Bibliography ==
- Shores, Christopher F.; Franks, Norman; Guest, Russell (1990). Above the Trenches: A Complete Record of the Fighter Aces and Units of the British Empire Air Forces 1915–1920. London, UK: Grub Street. ISBN 0-948817-19-4.
