= Dale Sanders (railroad photographer) =

American photographer (born 1957)

Dale Sanders (born 1957) is a prolific railroad photographer and the former editor of CTC Board, a magazine for fans of railroading showcasing high-quality photography and up-to-date news of North American railroading. The magazine frequently featured Sanders' work.

Dale graduated from Oroville High School, in Oroville, California in 1975. He then attended California State University, Chico, where he graduated with a bachelor's degree in Visual Communication (photography, graphic design, and printing technology).

During his college years Dale took over the editorship of a small newsletter about railroading in the western United States. During his tenure, CTC Board became a magazine with worldwide circulation. In 1995 the magazine was sold to Hundman Publishing of Edmonds, Washington. It was sold again to White River Productions in 2006. It is still in publication under the title Railroads Illustrated.

Sanders extensively photographed the Western Pacific Railroad in California's Feather River Canyon, the Denver & Rio Grande Western throughout Colorado and Utah, U.S. Steel's Atlantic City Mine Railroad and most recently BC Rail in western Canada.

He now resides in northwestern Washington state writing/editing railroad-related books.

Sanders received the WinteRail Hall of Fame Award in 2014.
