= Carstens Publications =

US publisher

- Status: Defunct
- Founded: 1933
- Founder: Emanuele Stieri, Harold Carstens
- Defunct: 2014
- Country of origin: United States
- Headquarters location: Newton, New Jersey
- Publication types: Books, magazines
- Nonfiction topics: Railfanning, rail transport, Rail transport modeling, model airplanes
- Official website: www.carstens-publications.com

Carstens Publications, Inc. was a publisher of books and magazines related to the railroad and airplane hobby fields that operated under various names from 1933 to 2014. Carstens was the chief competitor to Kalmbach Publishing in the scale model hobby and enthusiast field.

At its closing, the company published three monthly magazines: Railroad Model Craftsman, Railfan & Railroad, and Flying Models. The company also published annuals, including The On30 Annual, The HOn3 Annual, and Great Railroad Photography. Carstens also published books on railroad history, scale model railroading, aviation, and model airplanes.

== History ==
The roots of the company go back to 1933 with the establishment of The Model Craftsman magazine in Chicago by Emanuele Stieri with editor Harold V. Loose. The magazine initially covered many types of home hobbycraft.

Charles A. Penn took over the company in 1934, and the publishing house established offices in New York City. In 1942, the company was moved across the Hudson River to suburban Ramsey, New Jersey. In 1948, its focus was narrowed to model railroading, and the magazine was renamed Railroad Model Craftsman. (Rival publication Model Railroader liked to proclaim "Model railroading exclusively since 1934.")

In 1952, contributor Harold Carstens (known to his friends as "Hal") joined the staff as an associate editor. He moved up the editorial ranks and was named president of the company after Penn retired in 1962. In 1955, the company moved to larger quarters in an old telephone company building on Arch Street in Ramsey. In July 1963, the company moved again, to the historic Ramsey Journal building next to the Erie Railroad main line and across the street from the Ramsey train station. Carstens purchased the company outright from Charles Penn later that year.

In 1969, he renamed it Carstens Publications. He also purchased Flying Models magazine, adding coverage of the model airplane hobby.

In 1973, the company moved a final time, to Newton, New Jersey. The company created Railfan magazine in 1974 to serve railroad enthusiasts and railfans; five years later, Carstens purchased the Railroad magazine, published since 1906, and merged the two into Railfan & Railroad magazine. In mid-decade, the company was also publishing Creative Crafts magazine.

In 2006, Carstens Publications launched On30 Annual, dedicated to the modeling of narrow-gauge railways in O scale, followed three years later by HOn3 Annual—both edited by Chris Lane. In 2010, Railfan & Railroad launched a special edition, Great Railroad Photography, to show new and vintage innovative and creative photography.

After Hal Carstens died in 2009, his son Henry took over as president and publisher, helped by his mother, Phyllis Carstens.

The company struggled financially for several years before Carstens announced that it would close on August 22, 2014.

On September 1, 2014, White River Productions acquired Railfan & Railroad, Railroad Model Craftsman, and the entire line of Carstens books. It said it would continue to publish the magazines and new books. It also purchased the rights to produce the On30 Annual and HOn3 Annual. Flying Models was not included in WRP's acquisitions.
