= Flying Models =

- Editor: Thayer Syme
- Categories: model aircraft
- Frequency: Monthly
- Publisher: Carstens Publications
- Founded: 1928
- Final issue: 2014
- Country: USA
- Based in: Newton, New Jersey
- Website: flying-models.com
- ISSN: 0015-4849

Flying Models was a monthly American magazine dedicated to model aviation published by Carstens Publications. It was the oldest continuously published magazine dedicated to model airplanes, having started as Flying Aces in October 1928. Flying Models was acquired by Carstens Publications in 1969 and ceased publication in 2014. The headquarters of the magazine was in Newton, New Jersey.

== The Flying Aces Era ==
The magazine was launched as Flying Aces in October 1928 by Periodical House, Inc. It was originally printed on coarse, pulpy, 7x10" paper, with more than 100 pages per issue, and sold for 15 cents per copy. In November 1933, the magazine moved to a slick format, printed on 8½x10" glossy paper, and began featuring full-sized plans for model airplanes in every issue; issue size was reduced to 74 pages. In addition to adventure stories, non-fiction aviation articles and aviation news were added, as were articles related to model airplanes. The magazine's tagline became "Fiction, Model Building, Fact — Three Aviation Magazines in One".

== The Flying Models Era ==
During World War II, the magazine had been subtitled "Magazine of the Flying Age". The content focused on the war effort, with little advertising, and late in the war the name changed briefly to Flying Age. In later years, model airplane construction features started appearing more regularly and became more and more dominant, until finally in 1947, the magazine was renamed Flying Models. It was sold to Carstens Publications in 1969 which began to publish the title without the fiction content.

Flying Models was set apart from its competition as it featured in-depth model construction features and new product reviews, and catered to specific interests within the model airplane construction hobby, such as soaring, control line, and stunt flying. The magazine also reported on the latest technology related to radio control, ducted fan, and electric flight. Editors Fanelli and Wiggin were both active hobbyists themselves, having built and flown many models of their own over the years. In December 2011, Flying Models expanded its reach with the debut of digital editions for home computers, laptops, and select mobile digital devices.

== Closure of Carstens Publications ==
After years of financial struggle, Carstens Publications' president Henry Carstens announced the company's permanent closure on August 22, 2014. No announcement was made about the future of Flying Models magazine.

== Magazine monthly columns ==
Because there are many aspects to the model airplane hobby, Flying Models carried a number of specialty columns each month.

F/F Sport - This column was written by Larry Kruse, and concerned free-flight sport flying.
Electric Flight - Don Belfort reported on the latest in electric flight.
Vintage Views - This was a look at the history of the hobby with Bob Noll.
R/C Acrobatics - In this column, Dave Lockhart explored the world of radio controlled acrobatic flight.
Fan Facts - Greg Moore reported on the emerging world of ducted-fan model airplanes.
C/L Combat - This was geared towards those interested in combat flight using control line models, by Phil Cartier.
C/L Stunt - Allen Brickhaus and Dennis Adamisin wrote this column for those interested in stunt flight using control line models towards the end of the magazine's tenure. Previous columnists for this section included Bill Simons, Windy Urtnowski, and Bob Hunt.
Small Talk - This column was written by Pat Tritle.
