= Interurban Press =

American publishing company

- Company type: Private
- Industry: Publishing
- Genre: Electric transit, American railroads
- Founded: Los Angeles, California, U.S. (1943)
- Founder: Ira L. Swett
- Defunct: 1993
- Successor: Pentrex
- Headquarters: Glendale, California, United States
- Key people: Mac Sebree, Jim Walker
- Products: Books, magazines, videos, calendars
- Number of employees: 10 (1992)

Interurban Press was a small, privately owned American publishing company, specializing in books about streetcars, other forms of rail transit and railroads in North America, from 1943 until 1993. It was based in the Los Angeles area, and specifically in Glendale, California after 1976. Although its primary focus was on books, it also published three magazines starting in the 1980s, along with videos and calendars. At its peak, the company employed 10 people and generated about $2 million in business annually.

== Origins ==
Originally named Interurbans, the company developed out of a mimeographed newsletter first distributed by its founder, Ira L. Swett, in 1943. The Interurbans News Letter was for electric railway enthusiasts and anyone interested in streetcars/trolleys or electric interurbans as a hobby. Swett initially wrote the newsletter while stationed at Fort MacArthur as a U.S. Army Private First Class, and the earliest editions were intended to pass along news about streetcars and interurban railways in the U.S. to American railfans stationed overseas during World War II. Many of his readers became volunteer correspondents, sending news of electric-transit developments in their locales for inclusion in the newsletter. Swett also began publishing books—which he called Interurbans "Specials"—on the history of a particular streetcar system or related topic. The first, in 1944, was The “Big Subs” (big suburban cars), about a group of interurban cars used on a line between San Francisco and San Mateo from 1907 until 1923. He discontinued the newsletter in December 1948, concentrating thereafter on researching and writing books, which he still called "Specials". Streetcar systems were being abandoned in cities all around North America at that time and over the following two decades, heightening trolley fans' interest in recording systems' histories. Swett wrote about 50 books himself, but he also edited and published manuscripts written by others. The first non-electric railway book published by Interurbans was Seattle Trolley Coaches, in 1971, and the company later published other books about trolley buses, but most of its titles were about electric rail lines or other types of rail transportation.

== Reorganization and growth ==
When Ira Swett died in 1975, he left the company to his friend and collaborator, G. Mac Sebree, who shared Swett's love of electric railways and had worked professionally as a newspaper reporter in Albuquerque and was still working (until 1982) for United Press International. Sebree reorganized the company as Interurban Press and hired fellow-railfan Jim Walker to be its vice president. After about one year operating out of Sebree's home in Hollywood, they began leasing office space in Glendale.

Under Mac Sebree's ownership, Interurban Press expanded its output, from typically two hardcover books per year to at least six books per year, eight to ten "in a good year", and also acquired two monthly magazines, Pacific News and Passenger Train Journal (PTJ) (ISSN 0160-6913). Pacific News (renamed Pacific RailNews in late 1984; ISSN 8750-8486) was acquired from Chatham Publishing in 1983, and PTJ was acquired from PTJ Publishing in 1987. While keeping its main focus on electric urban transit, the company widened its range to include books about steam trains and non-passenger rail subjects.

In 1981, Interurban acquired the sales rights to the railroad and Western American titles of Trans-Anglo Books, another Glendale-based small-press publisher. During the 1980s the company also added railfan-oriented videos and calendars to its product line, the former being sold under the brand name "Interurban Films". (Before VHS video-cassette players became commonly in use, Interurban Press had offered a small number of films in Regular-8 or Super 8 format.)

In 1983, sales through general bookstores accounted for about 25% of Interurban's business, and another 15% came from direct mail-order sales. The balance of 60% was a combination of sales at scale-modelling/hobby shops and railway museum gift shops, together with foreign sales. At that time, a typical print run for an Interurban Press book was 3,000 copies, but some titles were much more popular and had larger initial printings or multiple reprintings. The publisher's best-selling title up to 1983, Dinner in the Diner, had sold 30,000 copies so far. In 1992, the two monthly magazines had circulations of about 10,000 each. Private Varnish, a quarterly magazine about privately owned passenger rail cars, had about 3,000 subscribers. Publication of books continued, concurrently. The company had 10 employees at that time, divided between its main office in Glendale and a production office in Waukesha, Wisconsin.

In 1992 and 1993, Interurban Press also published the softcover North American Light Rail Annual and User's Guide, about existing and planned light rail systems in the United States, Canada and Mexico. A third edition was published in 1994 by the company's successor (albeit still edited by Mac Sebree), but that turned out to be the final edition of that annual, which had sold about 10,000 copies per year.

Mac Sebree retired in 1993 and on August 6 of that year sold Interurban Press to Pentrex, which did not continue publishing under the Interurban Press name.

== See also ==
- List of railroad-related periodicals
