= White River Productions =

Independent American publishing company

- Status: Active
- Founded: 1992
- Founder: Kevin EuDaly
- Country of origin: United States
- Headquarters location: Bucklin, Missouri
- Publication types: Books, magazines
- Nonfiction topics: Railfanning, rail transport, Rail transport modeling,
- Official website: www.whiteriverproductions.com

White River Productions is an independent publishing company that specializes in books and magazines targeted to railroad enthusiasts and historians. Kevin EuDaly founded the company in 1992 to publish the book Missouri Pacific Diesel Power, which he also authored. Several other titles followed, and the company became his full-time venture beginning in 1996. The company expanded when it took on publishing newsletters and managing membership databases for several railroad historical societies. The company is headquartered in Bucklin, Missouri.

== Magazine Titles ==
=== Railroad Model Craftsman ===
Established in 1933, Railroad Model Craftsman was published by Penn Publications until purchased by Hal Carstens and Carstens Publications in the 1960s. White River Productions acquired RMC from Carstens Publications in September 2014. This monthly magazine focuses on projects and research for active scale model railroad enthusiasts. Stephen Priest was named editor starting with the January 2015 edition, succeeded by Otto Vondrak in May 2019.

=== Railfan & Railroad ===
Railfan was the first title established in-house by Carstens Publications in 1974. Originally scheduled as a quarterly, frequency increased to bi-monthly in 1977 and monthly in 1987. Carstens merged it with Railroad Magazine in 1979. White River Productions acquired Railfan & Railroad magazine from Carstens in September 2014. The magazine covers railroad topics throughout North America, including freight and passenger lines. Heritage railways, preservation, and historical topics are featured as well. Steve Barry is the editor.

=== Model Railroad News ===
Launched in 1995, Model Railroad News is a monthly publication dedicated to the latest model railroad new product announcements, product reviews, and industry news. The magazine temporarily ceased publication in October 2011. White River Productions acquired the title and resumed publication with the March 2012 issue. The magazine is edited by Tony Cook.

=== Railpace Newsmagazine ===
Railpace Newsmagazine focuses on railroad news and photos from around the Northeastern United States and Maritime Canada. The publication was founded in 1982 by Tom Nemeth, Denis Connell, and Bill Chaplik. On January 20, 2020, White River Productions acquired Railpace Newsmagazine, retaining Tom Nemeth as Editor. Carl Perelman continues to perform his duties as News Editor. All of the content in the magazine is contributed by readers.

=== Passenger Train Journal ===
The original Passenger Train Journal was founded in 1968 as a quarterly publication, increasing to monthly frequency in 1979. Acquired by Interurban Press in 1987, it was later sold to Pentrex in 1993. Publication ended in 1999. White River Productions resurrected Passenger Train Journal in 2006, with Mike Schafer as editor. The magazine is produced quarterly, and focuses on passenger train and rail transit development past and present in North America. With Mike Schafer retiring, Kevin J. Holland was named editor in 2022.

=== Trains & Railroads of The Past ===
White River Productions acquired The Railroad Press from the publishing company of the same name during the summer of 2014. Founded in 1989 as The Railfan Photographer, it later morphed into The Railroad Press. The quarterly publication was renamed Trains & Railroads of The Past, with a focus on the late postwar era in North American railroading between 1960 and 1980. Jaime Serensits is the editor.

=== HO Collector Magazine ===
The first new title launched in-house by WRP, HO Collector is a new quarterly magazine dedicated to the history of HO scale 1:87 model trains. Not only will feature content trace the lineage of popular and obscure models, but will also focus on collecting, repairing, and operating vintage model trains. The magazine debuts with the Spring 2017 issue. Tony Cook is the editor, with Tony Lucio as associate editor.

=== Railroads Illustrated ===
Dating back to a mimeographed leaflet first distributed in 1970 as CTC Board, the publication later transferred to a more traditional magazine format. White River Productions acquired CTC Board: Railroads Illustrated from Hundman Publishing following the production of the May 2006 issue. A new editorial focus was chosen for the magazine, and it was renamed Railroads Illustrated with the first edition dated February 2007. Cinthia Priest has been editor of the magazine during its entire run. The final monthly edition of Railroads Illustrated was published in December 2014, with news and some feature content consolidated into an expanded Railfan & Railroad magazine. Future editions of Railroads Illustrated will be released on an annual special edition basis. Steve Jessup was named editor in 2019.

=== On30 Annual ===
The only annual publication dedicated to O scale narrow gauge model railroading, the first On30 Annual was produced in 2006, published by Highlands Station, the publishers of Model Railroading magazine. With the closure of Highlands Station, the publication moved to Carstens Publications starting with the 2008 edition. White River Productions acquired the On30 Annual from Carstens Publications in September 2014. This annual publication is dedicated to narrow gauge model railroading in O scale (1:48), as well as product news and reviews. The annual is edited by Chris Lane.

=== HOn3 Annual ===
The only annual publication dedicated to HO scale narrow gauge model railroading, the first HOn3 Annual was launched in 2009 by Carstens Publications. White River Productions acquired the HOn3 Annual from Carstens Publications in September 2014. Using the same successful formula as the On30 Annual, the HOn3 Annual features narrow gauge model railroading in HO scale (1:87) exclusively. Chris Lane is the editor.

=== Narrow Gauge and Short Line Gazette ===
Published continuously since 1975 by Benchmark Publications, the Narrow Gauge and Short Line Gazette caters to active model railroaders with an interest in building models of narrow gauge railways and equipment. The magazine was sold to WRP in 2017, with Bob Brown remaining as editor. The magazine is published six times a year.

=== O Scale Trains ===
Founded by Joe Giannovario in 2002, O Scale Trains Magazine was one of the first magazines dedicated to the two-rail O scale modeling community. Upon Giannovario's passing in June 2013, his wife Jaini continued publication until the title was sold to WRP in 2018. The magazine is published six times a year with Martin Brechbiel as editor.

=== Garden Trains Annual ===
Garden Trains Annual was launched in 2021 to cater to the garden railway enthusiast, combining the hobbies of model railroading with outdoor gardening. The annual publication features tours of home layouts, tips and techniques to build your own models, as well as ideas for landscaping and plantings. The editor is Chris Lane.

=== Diesel Era ===
Diesel Era was founded in 1990 by publisher Paul Withers to document the history of diesel locomotive development in North America. The title was acquired from Withers Publishing in April 2021. The magazine will change from a bi-monthly to a quarterly publication, increased to 64 pages. The editor is Tony Cook.

== Other publishing ==
White River publishes books that focus on fine railroad photography, with a particular focus on postwar railroad history. The company also produces magazines for a number of railroad historical societies and the NMRA Magazine.
