= Passenger Train Journal =

American magazine

- Editor: Kevin J. Holland (2022–)
- Former editors: Carl Swanson, Mike Schafer, Kevin P. Keefe
- Categories: Passenger rail transport
- Frequency: Quarterly (2006–); monthly 1979–96
- Publisher: Kevin EuDaly
- First issue: Spring 1968
- Company: 1968–87: PTJ Publishing Co. 1987–93: Interurban Press; 1993–96: Pentrex; 2006 to date: White River Productions, Inc.
- Country: United States
- Based in: Bucklin, Missouri
- Website: passengertrainjournal.com
- ISSN: 0160-6913

Passenger Train Journal (PTJ) is an American magazine about passenger rail transport and rail transit past and present, oriented for railfans and rail passenger advocates and published currently by White River Productions. Founded in 1968, it was published continuously until 1996, and monthly from 1979 onward, but then ceased publication. After a 10-year absence, the title was revived in 2006 by a different publishing company, as a quarterly magazine. PTJ deals exclusively with passenger rail, not freight. Although focused on North America, each issue includes at least a small amount of content on overseas—usually European—passenger rail. The magazine is headquartered in Bucklin, Missouri.

== History ==
Passenger Train Journal was founded in 1968 by Kevin McKinney, who established the PTJ Publishing Company for the purpose. The magazine originally was issued quarterly, becoming bimonthly in fall 1975 and monthly starting in March 1979. McKinney remained its publisher and owner until selling the magazine to Interurban Press in 1987. Publication continued under Interurban Press, and as of 1992 PTJ's circulation was about 10,000. In 1993, Interurban Press was acquired by Pentrex, which continued publishing PTJ until abruptly "suspending" publication at the end of 1996. Pentrex never revived the magazine, and indeed in 1999 ceased publishing all of its other magazines as well.

== White River Productions era ==
In 2006, Passenger Train Journal was resurrected by Kevin EuDaly of White River Productions, as a quarterly magazine. Appointed to the position of Editor was Mike Schafer, who had been one of the magazine's past editors, from 1983 until 1990. The first issue published by White River Productions was No. 229, Fourth Quarter 2006. For the first ten years after the magazine's relaunching, each issue had 48 pages, but the page count was increased to 64 pages per issue with the first issue of 2017, and to 76 pages with the first issue of 2022. Kevin J. Holland succeeded Mike Schafer as PTJ editor in April 2022, effective with issue 292, Third Quarter 2022. Holland had been on the magazine's editorial and design staff since its 2006 revival, serving for most of that time as Senior Editor.

== See also ==
- Pacific RailNews
- Passenger train
- List of railroad-related periodicals
