= Pacific RailNews =

American magazine

- Cover of December 1986 issue
- Categories: Rail transport
- Frequency: Monthly
- Circulation: 10,000 (1992)
- First issue: September 1961 (as Pacific News)
- Final issue Number: August 1999; No. 429
- Company: 1961–83: Chatham Publishing Co.; 1983–93: Interurban Press; 1993–99: Pentrex
- Country: United States
- ISSN: 8750-8486

Pacific RailNews (PRN), originally named Pacific News and later RailNews, was an American monthly magazine about railroads and rail transit, oriented for railfans. It was published from 1961 until 1999. Although its coverage primarily concerned the western United States and western Canada, the magazine included less-detailed news on railroads and rail transit from non-western states, as well as Mexico.

== History ==
Founded in 1961 as Pacific News (ISSN 0030-879X), by the Pacific Locomotive Association, from its inception the magazine was originally published monthly by Chatham Publishing Company (of Burlingame, California), Karl R. Koenig, editor and publisher. Issue number 1 was published in September 1961. By the third issue the magazine was independent and not produced by the Association. Pacific News was originally printed on uncoated paper, but coated paper was used starting with issue 32. The magazine was acquired by Interurban Press in 1983, and the October 1983 issue was the first under the new publisher. Publication was then bimonthly for a time, but returned to being monthly in December 1984.

Starting with the October 1984 issue, the name was changed to Pacific RailNews (also informally written Pacific Rail News) (ISSN 8750-8486), so as to more clearly indicate its subject area to anyone not yet familiar with the magazine. As of 1992, when Interurban Press was publishing the magazine, PRN had a circulation of about 10,000 and subscribers all over the world.

In 1993, Mac Sebree, publisher of PRN and owner of Interurban Press, retired and sold the entire business to Pentrex. Pentrex took over both PRN and Passenger Train Journal (PTJ) from Interurban Press, but discontinued PTJ in late 1996. The geographic coverage of Pacific RailNews was expanded to include all major U.S. railroads, rather than just those in the West and Midwest, and effective January 1997 the magazine's name became RailNews (ISSN 1091-2436). Pentrex eventually decided to discontinue publication of all of its magazines, and the final issue of RailNews was that dated August 1999.

== Format ==
Each issue of PRN had feature articles and several pages of news. Under Interurban Press, the news coverage was separated by railroad company (e.g., Rio Grande, Southern Pacific, Amtrak), with a regular columnist for each, but at the front of each issue there was also a general news section for national, miscellaneous or last-minute news. A "Short Lines" column covered the short-line railroads. Until 1989, coverage of urban rail transit was also presented in the form of regular locally compiled news columns covering the then-few light rail systems in the West Coast states, supplemented at the back of the magazine by a separate one-page column (by publisher Mac Sebree) giving briefer rail-transit news on the rest of the country; the latter was called "Interurbans Newsletter" in tribute to a previous newsletter which had given birth to Interurban Press, PRN's publisher. In fall 1989, the individual columns on west coast light rail systems and the "Interurbans" column were combined into a single, smaller news section for rail transit, and other sections of the magazine were also reorganized at that time. The magazine was expanded from 48 pages to 56 pages in January 1990. Pentrex's acquisition of PRN in 1993 eventually led to other format changes. Starting in January 1995, most issues had 82 pages, and the word "Pacific" was made much smaller than the words "RailNews" on the cover. "Pacific" was dropped altogether from the magazine's name in 1997, as coverage was expanded to include the Eastern U.S. Along with the magazine's size, the proportion of photos and maps published in color also had been increasing, and by 1997 the only black-and-white images in the magazine were the occasional historical photo that had been shot on black-and-white film originally.

== See also ==
- Railnews – monthly British newspaper
- List of railroad-related periodicals
