= Pentrex =

Rail-related media company

Pentrex Media Group, LLC, is an American producer and seller of railfan-related videos and DVDs. It was founded in 1984 and was originally headquartered in Pasadena, California.

The company discontinued the sale of VHS video tapes on July 31, 2009. Until 1999, Pentrex also published books and magazines, and its magazine editorial offices were located in Waukesha, Wisconsin. It continues to sell books and back issues of its defunct magazines, but no longer publishes any. In August 1993, the company acquired Glendale-based Interurban Press, a publisher of books primarily about streetcars, interurbans and trolley buses, in business since the 1940s. Initially, Pentrex continued publication of books and all of the magazines it had acquired from Interurban Press, but these were gradually phased out, as the company concentrated on production and sales of videos and, later, DVDs.

The last magazines published by Pentrex were RailNews (ISSN 1091-2436) (formerly Pacific RailNews, ISSN 8750-8486) and Vintage Rails, the final issues of which were those dated August 1999 and September/October 1999, respectively. Pentrex also published Passenger Train Journal (ISSN 0160-6913) until 1996 and Locomotive & Railway Preservation magazine (ISSN 0891-7647) until 1997. Passenger Train Journal resumed publication in late 2006, with a new publisher, White River Productions.

In 2007, the Midwest Book Review's "Wisconsin Bookwatch" recommended Pentrex as "the premier producer of railroading documentaries showcasing and highlight the trains and rail systems, the routes and histories, their engines, equipment, bridges, and more".

On April 7, 2017, the company merged with Highball Productions and moved from Pasadena to Indianapolis, Indiana.

== See also ==
- List of railroad-related periodicals
