= Railnews =

British magazine

- Editor: Sim Harris
- Former editors: Paul Whiting, Keith Horrox (1963–1989)
- Categories: Rail transport
- Frequency: Monthly
- Publisher: 1963–96: British Rail; 1997–present: Railnews Ltd
- Founder: British Railways Board
- First issue: July 1963
- Country: England
- Based in: Wellingborough
- Language: English
- Website: www.railnews.co.uk

Railnews is a national monthly newspaper and news website for the British railway network.

== Content ==
Railnews concentrates on issues important to employees of the railway industry, such as investment, careers, changes to industry structure, political developments, industrial relations and other trade union matters. It also maintains a focus on the people of the rail industry, rather than the companies alone. As a trade title covering the modern industry, it is not designed for railway enthusiasts or the heritage railway market.

The ethos of Railnews is to be "dispassionate, objective and accurate". Following this, Railnews never carries unmarked advertorials, although much of its advertising revenue does come from major railway suppliers and operators.

== History ==
A Railnews special edition on the Advanced Passenger Train from 1980

Railnews, in the early days spelt 'Rail News', was originally the house newspaper of British Railways, published by the British Railways Board. It first appeared in 1963 under the editorship of Keith Horrox with a price of 6d, replacing the former magazines which had been produced for each railway Region, although Regional 'slip' pages continued for many years. From 1978 to October 1996 it was issued free to all employees of British Rail. An attempt to sell it as a result of the privatisation of British Rail was unsuccessful and production ceased in October 1996. In February 1997 the title was revived by some former BR managers, with Sir William McAlpine as Chairman and Cyril Bleasdale as Managing Director. Both maintained these positions until their deaths. The managing director is now David Longstaff. Only four months went by between the ending of the BR version and the launch in March 1997 of its independent successor.

== Today ==
Distributed to both individual subscribers and large railway companies (who have corporate subscriptions) it penetrates the entire industry from trackside to boardroom.

The newspaper and website were both fully redesigned in February 2012, bringing a new, cleaner, more modern look to the title. Since September 2009 the Managing Editor has been former BBC journalist Sim Harris. He succeeded Paul Whiting, who has retired.
