= Trains (magazine) =

Magazine dedicated to trains and railroads

- Cover of the August 2024 issue
- Editor: Bill Stephens
- Categories: Rail transport
- Frequency: Monthly
- Total circulation: 80,001 (2018)
- Founded: 1940
- Company: Firecrown Media
- Country: United States
- Based in: Brookfield, Wisconsin
- Language: English
- Website: www.trains.com/trn/
- ISSN: 0041-0934
- OCLC: 51782761

Trains is a monthly magazine about trains and railroads aimed at railroad enthusiasts and railroad industry employees. The magazine primarily covers railroad happenings in the United States and Canada, but has some articles on railroading elsewhere.

It was founded as Trains in 1940 by publisher Al C. Kalmbach and editorial director Linn Westcott. From October 1951 to March 1954, the magazine was named Trains and Travel.

Trains was long among the 11 magazines published by Kalmbach Media, based in Waukesha, Wisconsin. In May 2024, Kalmbach Media sold Trains, along with other railroad and astronomy-related publications to Firecrown Media.

== Editors ==
- Al C. Kalmbach, 1940–1948
- Willard V. Anderson, 1948–1953
- David P. Morgan, 1953–1987
- J. David Ingles, 1987–1992
- Kevin P. Keefe, 1992–2000, 2004, 2022 (interim)
- Mark W. Hemphill, 2000–2004
- Jim Wrinn, 2004–2022. A former reporter and editor at the Charlotte Observer, Wrinn served until his death in 2022.
- Carl A. Swanson, 2022–2025
- Bill Stephens, 2025-Present

== See also ==
- Railroad-related periodicals
