= Colin Gifford =

British railway photographer (born 1936)

- Born: Colin Telfer Gifford; 1936 (age 89–90); London, England
- Education: Harrow School of Art
- Employer: Ian Allan Publishing
- Known for: New Approach
- Notable work: Decline of Steam
- Movement: Railway photography

Colin Telfer Gifford (born 1936) is a British railway photographer. Gifford pioneered the "New Approach" to railway photography in the 1960s during the declining years of steam. This approach relies heavily on abstraction and sought to encapsulate the dirty working atmosphere of the railway.

== Early years ==
Gifford was born in London in 1936, and grew up near King's Cross. As a child he had no particular interest in railways – though he lived within walking distance of King's Cross station, he was never a trainspotter. Instead, he positioned himself by the ticket barriers, to better watch the flow of travellers and the bustle of station business as much as the trains themselves. It was not until his student days in the late 1950s at Harrow School of Art that he found tangible expression for the visual possibilities that railways offered him.

Though he was more interested in illustration than in photography, he began taking photographs of railway scenes around north London and especially along the Great Central Main Line that passed through Harrow, gradually moving further afield.

Although Bill Brandt is often cited as a major influence, the style that made Gifford's name owed much to the work of a little-known Swiss avant-garde railway photographer Jean-Michel Hartmann, whose book Magie du rail (French for 'The Magic of Rail') (Editions Amart, 1959) revealed an eye for pattern and form that had an impact on Gifford's pictorial approach.

== 1960s ==
In the early 1960s Gifford joined Ian Allan Publishing as art editor and occasionally placed railway photographs in the magazines he designed. He took many of his well-known shots – including images of Bulleid pacifics at speed, captured from trains on adjacent lines – during his daily commute. Thirty years later, one of these images was featured on a Royal Mail stamp. At the publishing house, he redesigned the Combined Volume, Railway World and helped to transform Trains Illustrated into Modern Railways, a large-format monthly for transport professionals. He also designed some trompe-l'œil covers for Model Railway Constructor, including a speeding Trix 'Warship' and a 00 gauge BR Standard Class 9F seemingly emitting an enormous plume of smoke.

Aside from his work at Ian Allan, Gifford continued to build a photographic record of every region of British Railways using a Rolleiflex medium-format twin-lens reflex camera. He also photographed the full length of the River Thames with the idea of one day making a book out of it. His work was predominantly in black and white. For 35 mm colour work he used cheaper, less sophisticated cameras such as the Russian-made Fed; in later years a Pentax SLR.

In 1965 the Decline of Steam book was published. In place of front three-quarter views (with the sun always coming over the photographer's shoulder and the locomotive number clearly visible), Decline of Steam portrayed misty industrial landscapes, sweating railway workers, rain-swept nocturnal platforms, and sulphurous engine sheds. The trains themselves were often almost an afterthought in this vision of the railway as a totality; some images did not feature trains at all. By 1967, Gifford had left his job to focus on photographing the final years of British steam

His work from this time influenced the British photographers John Tickner, Gordon Edgar and Adrian Freeman in their work on steam trains in China.

== Each a Glimpse ==
Each a Glimpse, his second book, which he also designed, was published by Ian Allan in 1970. Many of the pictures dated from 1967 to 1968 and the influence of Jean-Michel Hartmann – which was strong in Decline of Steam – was less marked in a book that showed how, in those final years of steam, Gifford had begun to experiment with new techniques and find his own visual language, less graphically dynamic and more pictorialist than before.

== And Gone Forever ==
Although he had amassed a collection of some 18,000 negatives between 1958 and 1968, with enough unpublished material (including his rarely glimpsed colour work) for many more books, Gifford's fastidiousness about his work became something of a stumbling block. The Thames book failed to find a publisher, while sales of Steam Railways in Industry (Batsford, 1976) were disappointing, as was the reproduction quality. Meanwhile, a projected seven-part region-by-region study with Ian Allan ceased after the first volume, Steam Finale North (1976), had been published. Gifford was not pleased when Ian Allan subsequently published Steam Finale Scotland, which was superficially a continuation of the series but in fact contained nothing by Gifford. Things had looked more promising when, the previous year, Gifford had signed with New English Library to produce the companion-piece to Each a Glimpse, entitled And Gone Forever. With an eye on the export market and foreign co-editions, extensive use of colour was stipulated for the first time. A mock-up of And Gone Forever was presented at the 1976 Frankfurt Book Fair but the book never reached production, at least in the form Gifford and his publisher anticipated. Deadlines came and went and though most of the design work was eventually completed, the contract was terminated in 1978. A very different book of the same title finally appeared from Oxford Publishing Company in 1994, but without the colour photographs that had been promised 18 years earlier.

== Commemorative stamps for the Royal Mail ==
Also in 1994, the Royal Mail published a set of five postage stamps featuring a selection of his photographs, chosen in collaboration with the designer Brian Delaney; as with all Royal Mail stamp issues, the designs were personally approved by the Queen. The stamps commemorate the sesquicentennial of a number of British train lines. There was an exhibition at the National Postal Museum (British Postal Museum) to mark the event, which included items such as Gifford's notebooks and treasured Rolleiflex camera.

== 2000s ==
By the late 2000s there was talk of a new, revised edition of Each a Glimpse with enhanced, digitally scanned images taken from the original negatives and a significant number of minor alterations to the layout. The book was published in 2012, and a slipcased limited edition was also offered at a premium price. Gifford's introduction to the revised edition of Each a Glimpse alludes to a set of approximately 100 colour images that had been exhibited at Kidderminster Railway Museum in 2009 under the title In the Wink of an Eye. The book Transition was published in August 2018 to mark the 50th anniversary of the last steam workings on British Rail. Kidderminster Railway Museum was to be the publisher and the images would feature diesel and electric traction as well as steam. Gifford had been one of few photographers who, in the fast-changing railway scene of the 1960s, responded creatively to the new forms of traction, often depicting them side by side with steam power. Gifford was present in person at the opening of an exhibition of photographs from the book – held at Kidderminster Railway Museum on 4 August 2018 – but of the finished copies there was no sign whatsoever. Rather than the more costly gravure method generally used for high-quality monochrome work, the KLM's printer had been instructed to use a simple four-colour process which, while less expensive, is not primarily designed for black and white. The book finally went on sale in May 2019, after long-standing production difficulties. In 2025, the Kidderminster Railway Museum published a collection of Gifford's colour photographs in a publication named in the wink of an eye..., the title of which was a reference to From a Railway Carriage.

== Published works ==
- Each a Glimpse (1970)
- Decline of Steam (1965)
- Steam Finale North (1976)
- Steam Railways in Industry (1976)
- And Gone Forever (1994)
- in the wink of an eye... (2025)

== Exhibitions ==
In 1996 Gifford was in an exhibition at the National Railway Museum. In 2003 the Newcastle Arts Centre mounted an exhibition of his works from the series, Decline Of Steam, Each a Glimpse and Gone for Ever. In 2009 he had a show at the Kidderminster Railway Museum.

== Collections ==
Gifford has four photographs in the collection of the Science and Society Picture Library (UK). His five commemorative stamps are in the collection of the Science Museum Group (UK).

== See also ==
- Phoenix Railway Photographic Circle
