= Trainspotters in the United Kingdom =

Trainspotter subculture

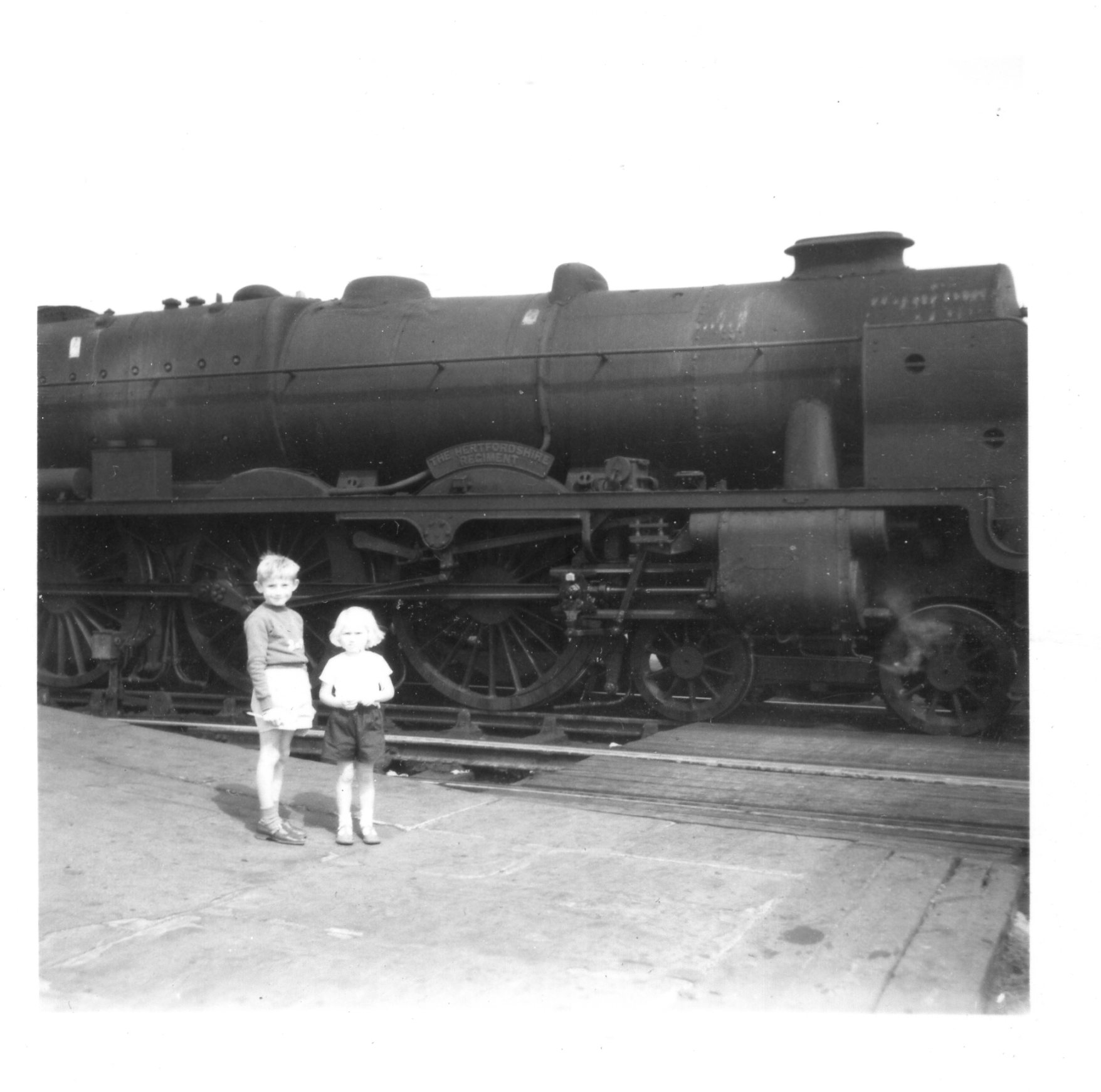
- A pair of young trainspotters photographed at Bletchley railway station, 1962
- Years active: 1940s-present
- Country: United Kingdom
- Major figures: Ian Allan; Francis Bourgeois; Colin Gifford; Nicholas Whittaker
- Influenced: Phoenix Railway Photographic Circle; The Anorak in popular culture

A trainspotter, also known as a locospotter or gricer, is a member of a British subculture that was popularised in the 1940s. Based on the spotting of locomotives and recording of their numbers, the subculture gained a notorious reputation in British popular culture during the twentieth century.

== History ==
=== Origins ===
The earliest evidence of the existence of trainspotting has been dated to the 1840s. Between 1841 and 1847, James Stovin Pennyman of Ormesby Hall noted details about trains running on the Great North of England Railway, although the first person believed to have noted solely locomotive names and numbers was Fanny Johnson in 1861.

Before the outbreak of World War II the practice of noting locomotive numbers as a leisure activity was considered popular among both children and adults; the author Eric Lomax recalled the presence of trainspotters on Britain's railways being a common sight in the inter-war period. Roger Kidner is reputed to have authored the first guide for trainspotters in the late 1930s, although Felix Pole had been producing partial lists of GWR locomotives since the 1920s.

=== Post-war ===
The railway historian Christian Wolmar has described post-war trainspotters as "a strangely British phenomenon". The subculture is often regarded as being formed by a Southern Railway employee, Ian Allan, who in 1942 published the ABC of Southern Locomotives. Allan's publication found a ready market reaching its seventh edition before the close of WWII, indeed so successful was his enterprise that the News Chronicle reported that he was regularly mobbed by young female and male trainspotters for his autograph.

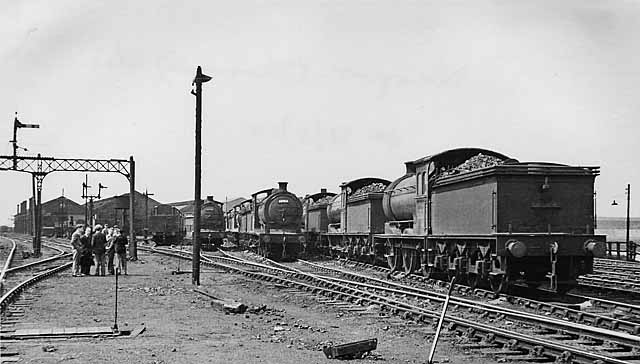
A group of trainspotters at Newport MPD in 1954

Trainspotters often congregated on stations platforms and adjacent to favoured railway lines. In the 1950s a trainspotting platform was erected adjacent to the main line in Finsbury Park to accommodate the volume of trainspotters who gathered there. Other methods were also developed in order to collect locomotive numbers. 'Shed-bashing' was an activity in which trainspotters would aim to visit as many engine sheds in a given period of time as possible. This may have been undertaken without the use of official permits or through an organised railway society.

Ian Allan described the heyday of trainspotting as having taken place between the mid-1950s and 1968 when the 1955 Modernisation Plan ended steam on British Railways. The popularity of trainspotting in post-war Britain has been attributed to the diversity and volume of steam locomotives operating on the network, while the formation of British Railways created a unified numbering system that favoured the collecting of locomotive numbers.

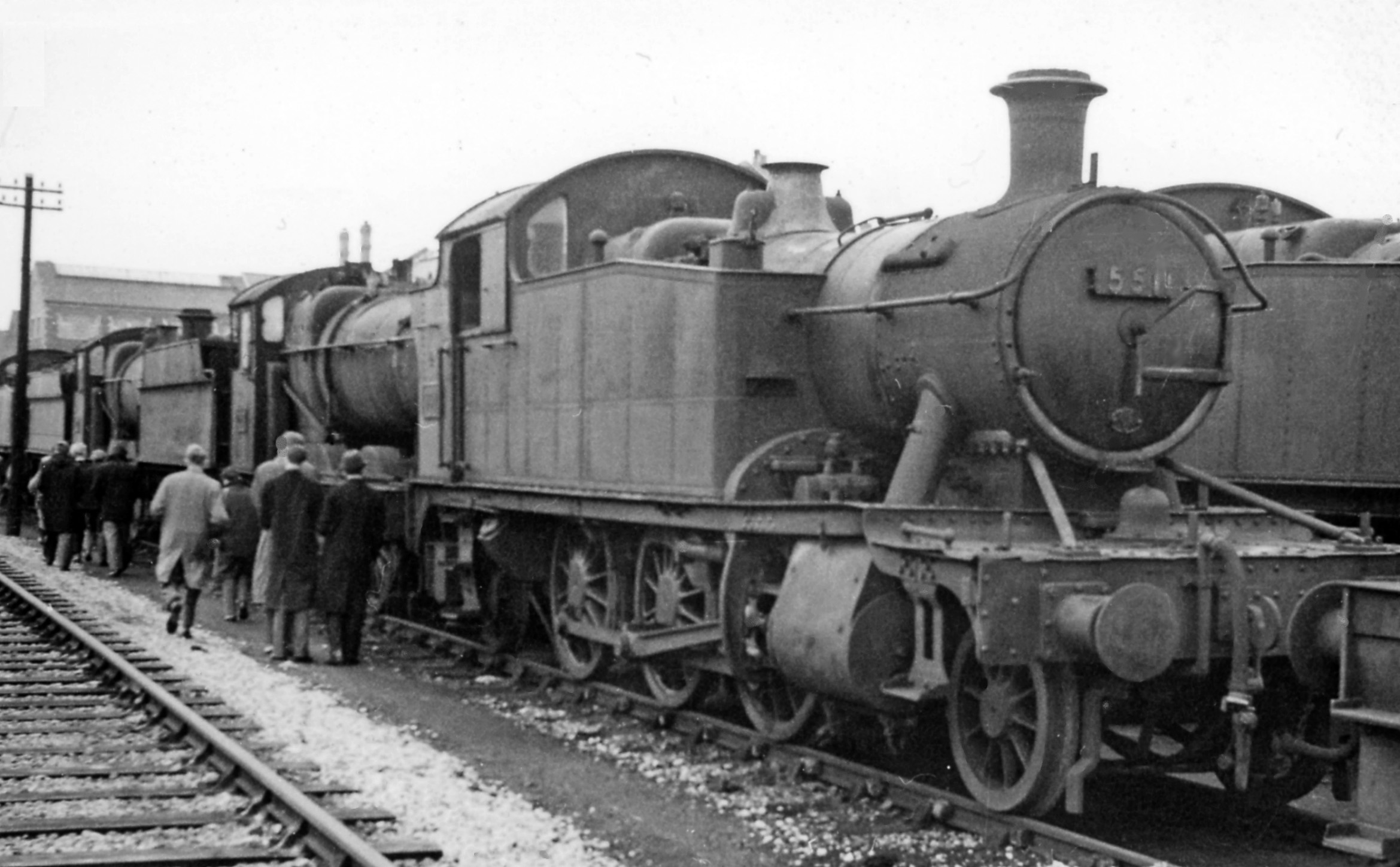
Trainspotters collect numbers of condemned locomotives at Swindon locomotive works

=== Moral panic ===
During the post-war period trainspotters became subject to a moral panic in the British press. Following occurrences of trespass by trainspotters at Tamworth railway station in 1944 the press began to regularly print alarmist reports on the subculture. In response to this moral panic British Railways began to ban trainspotters from their stations and laws were passed in order to deal with problematic behaviour. The Ian Allan Locospotters Club was also established in the late 1940s in reaction to the moral panic in order to prevent trespassing by trainspotters. A British Railways campaign for the same purpose was initiated in the mid-1950s. In 1948 a blanket ban on trainspotters at Tamworth Station was enforced despite the protests of The Railway Magazine who blamed the ban on the "misdeeds of a small minority".

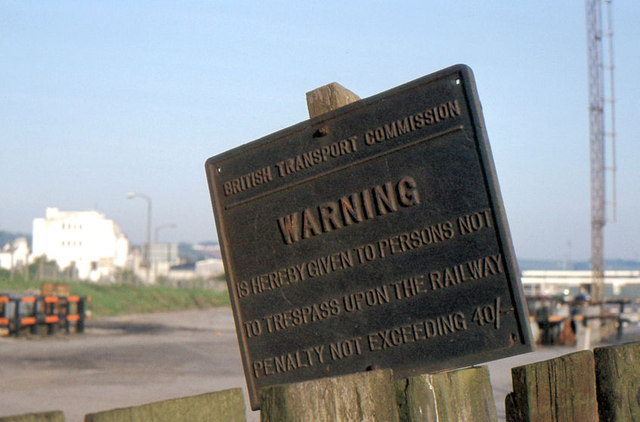
A typical example of a British Transport Commission anti-trespass sign

=== Post-steam ===
Following the end of steam on British Railways many trainspotters left the subculture. However others continued to hunt out remaining steam traction used by the National Coal Board, other private industrial lines, or began to travel abroad to spot steam locomotives. Many trainspotters transferred the focus of their activities over to diesel and electric locomotives. ‘Bashing’, an activity involving riding as many miles as possible behind a particular locomotive, became popular in the period.

Towards the end of the century a new genre of historical autobiography focusing on the trainspotter emerged often presenting the subculture in a nostalgic light as a product of an idealised British past.

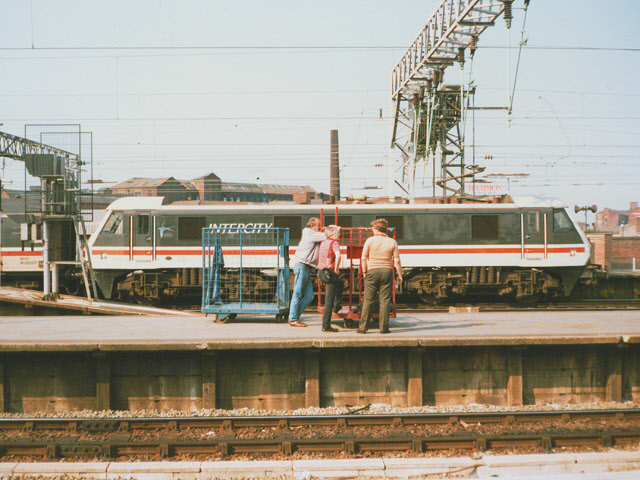
A trio of trainspotters on the platform of Manchester Piccadilly station in 1989

=== Decline ===
In 1975 the BBC broadcast a short documentary in which the journalist John Stapleton investigated the state of trainspotting in the post-steam era. He concluded that the subculture remained popular attracting children and adults alike. However, the latter half of the twentieth and beginning of the twenty-first centuries saw a steady reduction in the number of trainspotters in Britain, as evidenced by the fall both in sales of publications targeted at them and club memberships. The decline of the subculture during this period has been attributed to various factors including the end of steam, the move away from locomotive hauled trains, improved health and safety on the railways, and even terrorism.

=== Twenty-first century ===
In the wake of terrorist attacks in the UK, trainspotters reported being targeted by Network Rail at the start of the century. In response a 2003 edition of the magazine Railways Illustrated published a list of stations where trainspotters had been banned.

In 2008 The Mail on Sunday carried an article detailing alleged violent and drunken behaviour by a group of trainspotters known as the Peak Army. Named after the Class 45, the article was illustrated with an image of the group at a reunion in front of one of the locomotives whilst appearing to give Nazi salutes.

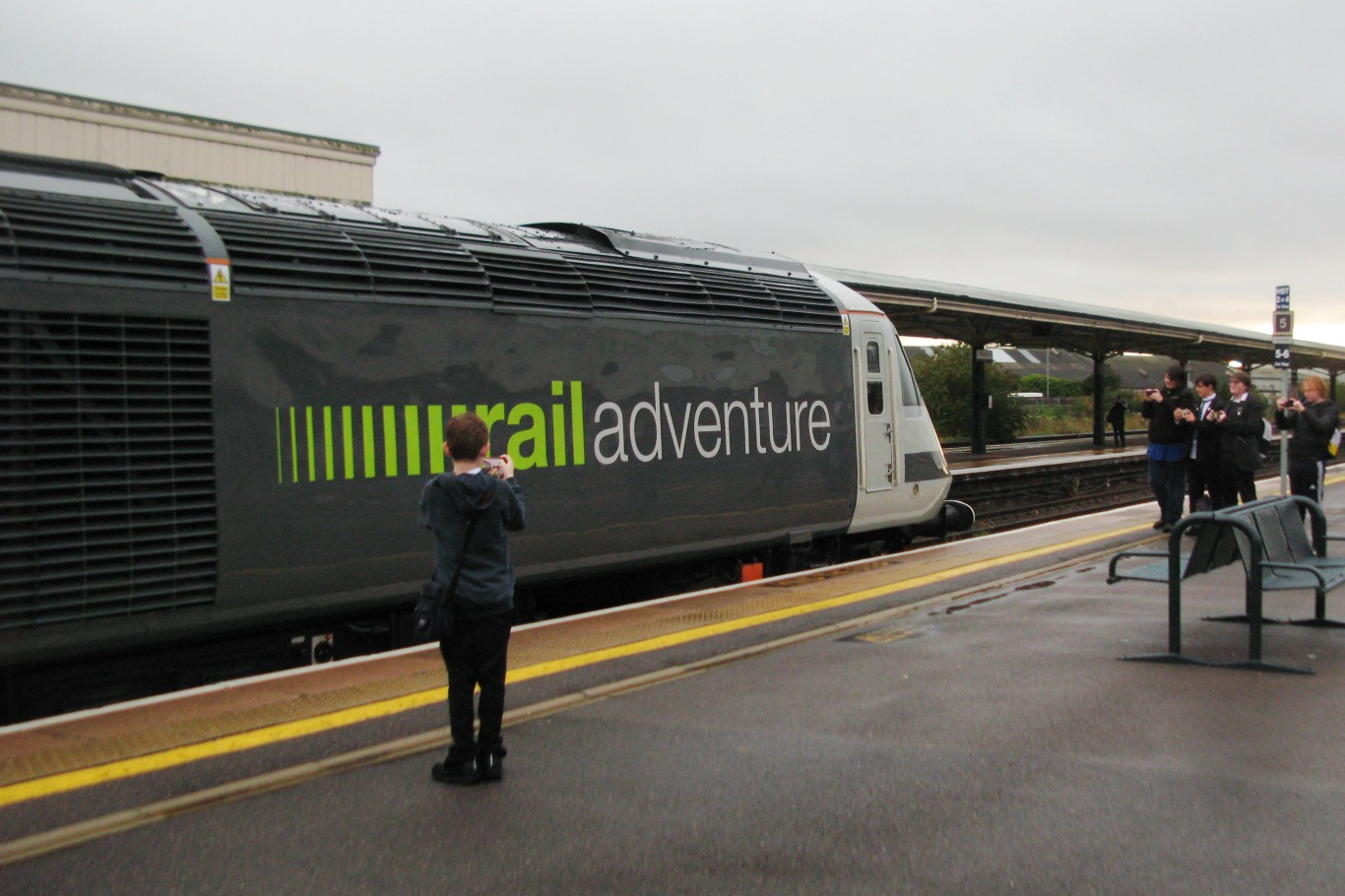
A group of young trainspotters at Taunton railway station in front of a Class 43 operated by RailAdventure

In 2010 BBC News reported on a trainspotter filmed at Thurston railway station who narrowly missed being struck by an oncoming train. In 2019 the British Transport Police issued an appeal for information following a trespass incident involving trainspotters attempting to view Flying Scotsman.

Despite its decline since the late twentieth-century trainspotting increased in popularity during the early 2020s. According to statistics produced by Google the subculture received increased interest following the COVID-19 pandemic. While the increased popularity of the subculture has been largely attributed to the influence of TikTok star Francis Bourgeois other societal factors have also been seen to have played a role. The renewed interest in trainspotting has led to the suggestion of a process of commodification of the subculture.

== Class ==
The class composition of trainspotting has changed over time. The author Nicholas Whittaker has asserted that the post-war trainspotter was typically a working-class youth in contrast to the middle-classes who had often taken an interest in railways prior to WWII. By the mid-1950s the subculture had once again started to become more middle-class but continued to retain vestiges of its working-class identity into the late twentieth-century.

== Etymology ==
The use of the term trainspotter first emerged in the UK in the mid-1940s and, despite being a misnomer, was quickly embraced by some within the subculture. The Oxford English Dictionary traces the term back to the word spotter which was in use in the 1890s. The synonymous term locospotter was coined by Ian Allan in the mid-1940s.

== Gender ==
Despite a stereotype developing around the trainspotter as being typically male, in 2014 research undertaken by the National Railway Museum discovered that the first recorded trainspotter was in fact a teenage girl named Fanny Johnson. In 1861 Johnson is known to have been keeping records of GWR locomotives she had spotted in London. Prior to the 1930s, publications produced for railway enthusiasts were marketed at both genders, with young girls being described as typical readers of such material. In the late-1930s at least one group of female trainspotters were known to congregate at New Southgate during school holidays.

The figure of the male trainspotter has been deconstructed as an expression of fragile masculinity current in late twentieth-century British society. In the twenty-first century female trainspotters have reported facing sexism within the subculture, and a continued gender disparity has been attributed to hostility online. The British poet Patience Agbabi has described herself as a trainspotter, and has included themes around trainspotting in her work.

== Tourism ==
After steam had been withdrawn on British Railways in 1968 trainspotters often travelled abroad to spot steam locomotives still in service. Popular destinations included the railways of central and Eastern European countries such as the DR, PKP, as well as the Indian Railways. British trainspotters who emigrated to West Germany as gastarbeiter in the late 1970s were known to travel to East Germany to spot steam locomotives which continued to operate there.

In the 1990s France became a particularly popular destination for British trainspotters along with other countries in Western Europe and Scandinavia. Such tourists were colloquially known as ‘Eurospotters’ within the subculture.

== In popular culture ==
The latter half of the twentieth century saw the emergence of the modern stereotype of the trainspotter. The subculture became stigmatised in popular culture with trainspotting developing into a byword for obsessive behaviour, unfashionable attire, and sexual perversion. Trainspotters became particularly associated with the anorak to the extent that the terms anorak and trainspotting have become synonymous colloquialisms for obsessive behaviour.

The writer Daniel Tunnard has self deprecatingly described his experience of being a trainspotter in the late 1980s as "like herpes, with none of the physical blemishes, but with all the social rejection". He goes on to describe the typical stereotype of a trainspotter that developed after the 1960s:

Trainspotting became the preserve of boys and men in bad spectacles (not so much National Health—too cool for us—but rather the kind of rounded square metal frames that you imagine going quite well with tinted yellow lenses and a moustache and a criminal record) and dark blue, unbranded quilted, hooded coats (one rarely saw the classic fur-lined anorak, which again, would have been too cool; we merely wore the first thing our mothers found in BHS) who took scant interest in their personal presentation, had little experience of friendship and even less experience with the opposite sex.

In the twenty-first century this stereotype has been challenged to a certain extent by the increased visibility of trainspotters on social media. In 2014 the National Railway Museum held an exhibition titled Trainspotting exploring the topic. Commissioned to make a video installation for the exhibition the artist Andrew Cross described trainspotting as a radical stance in modern society. The exhibition was intended to challenge the conventional stereotype built around the subculture and included work by the poet Ian Macmillan.

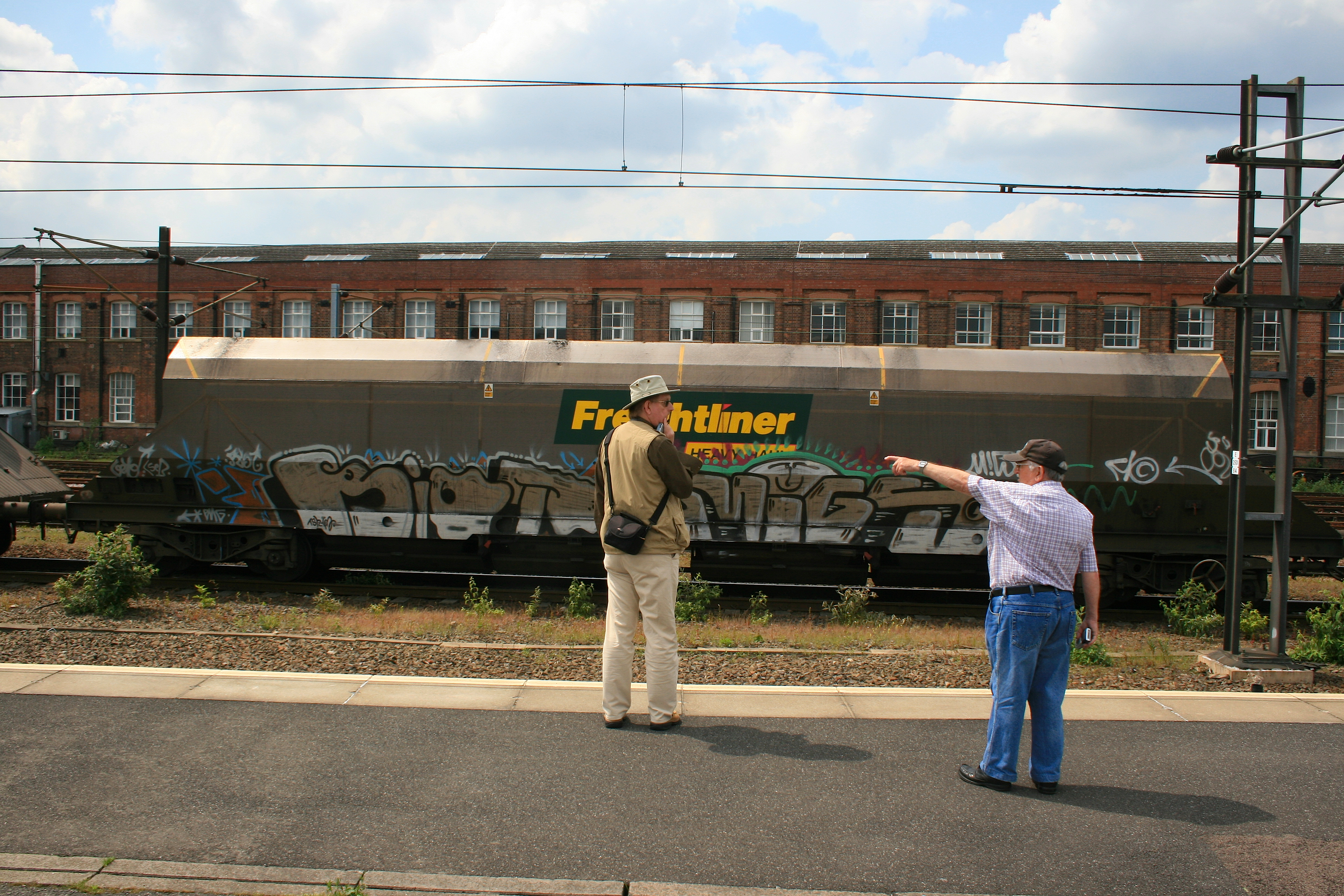
Trainspotters at Doncaster railway station in the twenty-first century

=== Digital media ===
Trainspotting was the title of a fan-produced game programmed for the Comx-35. In 1995 the software company Sensible Software released a video game called Sensible Train Spotting for the Amiga computer. The game featured a character dressed in an anorak spotting trains from a platform bench. In 2003 another games company released a similar video game featuring a trainspotter titled Train Tracking.

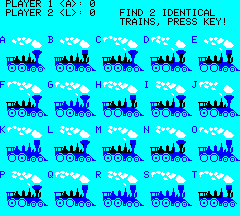
A screenshot of the Comx-35 game Trainspotting

In 2002 the preserved Llangollen Railway installed two digital cameras. The first of its kind in Britain the pay-per-view scheme was connected online via satellite and aimed at trainspotters.

Trainspotting with Francis Bourgeois is a digital series released by Channel 4 on YouTube in 2022. The series featured the trainspotter Francis Bourgeois alongside various celebrities including Aisling Bea, Jesse Lingard and Sam Ryder.

=== Film & television ===
In 1980 the BBC first broadcast the railway documentary Great Railway Journeys: Confessions of a Train Spotter. The programme title was premised on presenter Michael Palin’s childhood as a trainspotter.

Song of Experience, first aired in 1986, was a stand-alone film produced as part of the BBC’s Screen Two drama series. Written by Martin Allen and directed by Stephen Frears the play was a coming-of-age drama depicting a day in the life of three trainspotters.

In the early 1990s the BBC2 comedy show Harry Enfield & Chums included a sketch involving a trio of trainspotters which incorporated stereotypes of the subculture for humorous effect.

Trainspotter was the title of a 1996 animated short film about the activities of a lone trainspotter. The film won Best Short Animated Film Edinburgh 1996 and was nominated for the 50th BAFTA Award for Best Short Animation and for Best Short Animation at the 50th British Academy Film Awards.

Anorak of Fire is a play written by Stephen Dinsdale consisting of a monologue delivered by the character Gus Gascoigne, a stereotypical trainspotter nerd. First performed in the 1990s the play continued to be performed into the 2010s. In 1998 it was adapted into a television film of the same name, directed by Elijah Moshinsky.

‘The Bashers’ was an episode of The Other Side documentary series which was broadcast on Channel 4 in 2000. The episode followed a group of trainspotters as they bashed the last Class 37 hauled trains before the locomotives were withdrawn.

In 2016 the BBC aired a three part series called Trainspotting Live presented by Tim Dunn, Hannah Fry, Peter Snow, and Dick Strawbridge.

=== Music ===
Although, unlike other British subcultures, trainspotting has not been associated with a particular genre of music many trainspotters themselves associate their subculture with musical influences. In the mid-1990s Nicholas Whittaker observed that heavy metal and electronica were popular genres among trainspotters.

The Birmingham based 1990s band Eastfield developed their own version of ‘urban rail punk’, incorporating trainspotting themes in their lyrics and albums’ artwork. Another musical group influenced by the subculture was Mike Read’s band The Trainspotters.

== See also ==
- Densha otaku
- Glossary of United Kingdom railway terms
- Railfan
