= The Railway Magazine =

British railway magazine

- Cover of the July 2024 issue
- Editor: Paul Bickerdyke
- Former editors: See below
- Categories: Railway
- Frequency: Monthly
- Circulation: ▲37,291 (January–December 2015)
- First issue: July 1897
- Company: Mortons of Horncastle
- Country: United Kingdom
- Based in: Lincolnshire
- Language: English
- Website: railwaymagazine.co.uk
- ISSN: 0033-8923

The Railway Magazine is a monthly British railway magazine, aimed at the railway enthusiast market, that has been published in London since July 1897. As of 2010 it was, for three years running, the railway magazine with the largest circulation in the United Kingdom, having a monthly average sale during 2009 of 34,715 (the figure for 2007 being 34,661). It was published by IPC Media until October 2010, and in 2007 won IPC's 'Magazine of the Year' award. Since November 2010, The Railway Magazine has been published by Mortons of Horncastle.

== History ==
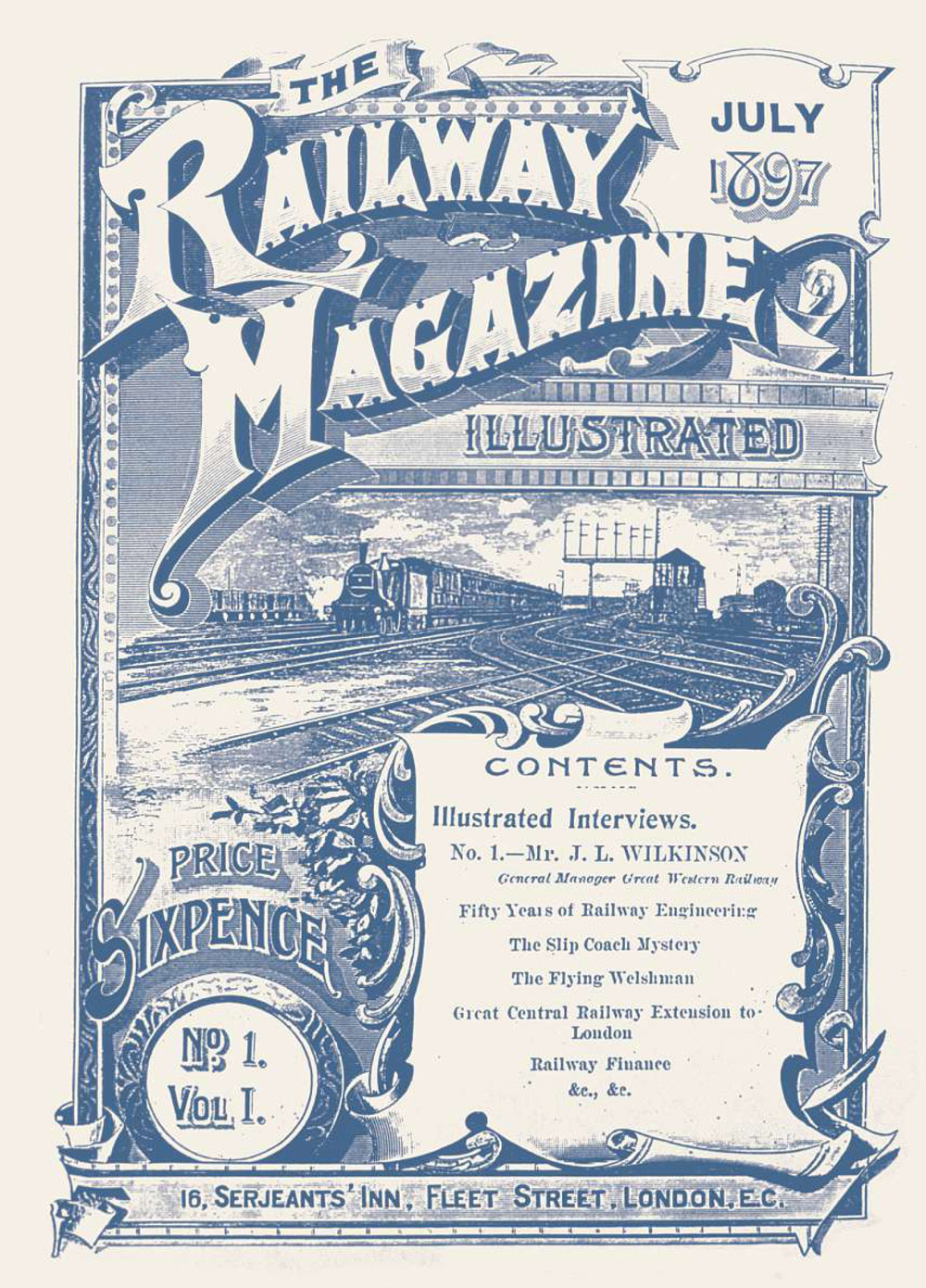
Issue 1 of The Railway Magazine - July 1897

The Railway Magazine was launched by Joseph Lawrence and ex-railwayman Frank E. Cornwall of Railway Publishing Ltd, who thought there would be an amateur enthusiast market for some of the material they were then publishing in a railway staff magazine, the Railway Herald. They appointed as its first editor a former auctioneer, George Augustus Nokes (1867–1948), who wrote under the pseudonym "G. A. Sekon". He quickly built the magazine circulation to around 25,000. From the start it was produced in Linotype on good-quality paper and well illustrated with photographic halftone and occasional colour lithographic plates.

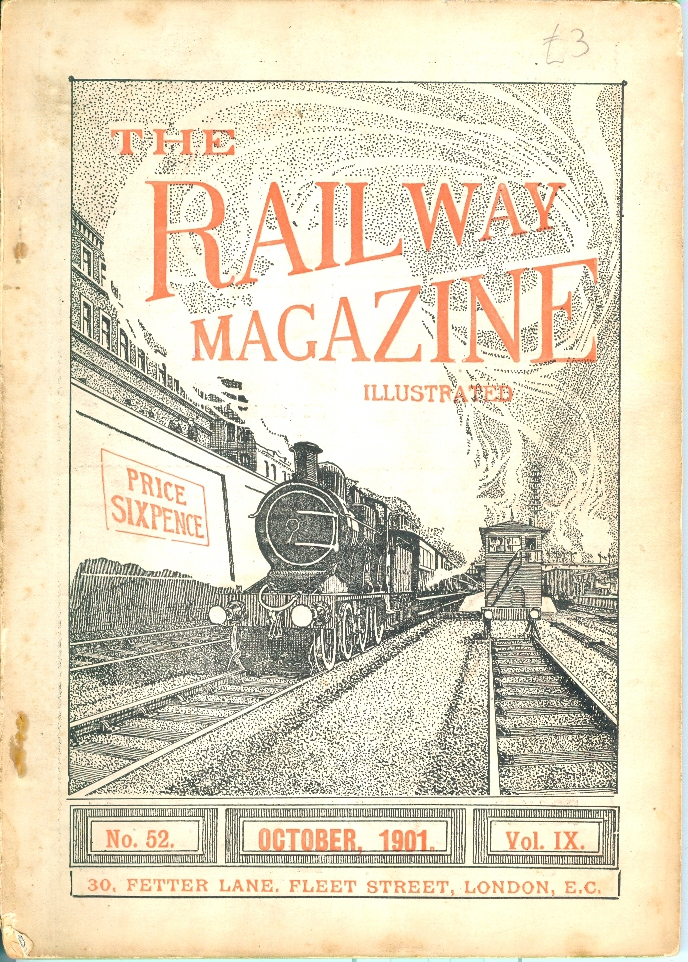
Cover of the October 1901 issue. Typical for early 20th century: only the colours, issue number, date and volume changed from month to month

In 1910, following a dispute with the proprietors, Nokes resigned and started a rival, very similar, magazine, Railway and Travel Monthly. Both this and The Railway Magazine in 1916 were purchased by John Aiton Kay (1883–1949), proprietor of the Railway Gazette, and Nokes's title was renamed Transport and Travel Monthly in 1920 before being amalgamated with The Railway Magazine from January 1923. Apart from this episode, The Railway Magazine had no serious commercial rival in its field until the 1940s. Kay himself served as editor after his predecessor had left for service in World War II. For many years the magazine shared editorial direction with the Railway Gazette, and for periods had officially no editor of its own. From May 1942 to the end of 1949, paper shortages compelled bi-monthly publication; in January 1942 there had been a reduction of the page size by a half-inch in both dimensions down to 9 by 6 inches (23 by 15 centimetres) (which lasted until October 1963), though it continued to use art paper for a centre section of photographs, which had begun in January 1934.

The magazine claims a record for the longest unbroken published series, begun under the title "British locomotive practice and performance" in 1901, characterised by detailed logs giving the timings of notable trips, recorded by observers with a stopwatch (the September 1930 column was 'pulled' by the editor as being too critical of Nigel Gresley's London and North Eastern Railway steam locomotives). Its first writer was the New Zealand-born Charles Rous-Marten (1844–1908). One of those who shared authorship of the series after his death was the Great Eastern Railway engineer Cecil J. Allen (1886–1973) who became sole author from 1911 until succeeded by Oswald Nock in 1958, when Cecil J. Allen moved his performance column to Trains Illustrated (later renamed Modern Railways), edited by his son, G. Freeman Allen. From 1981 to 2004 the performance series was written by Peter Semmens (1927–2007), who also served as chief correspondent from 1990, notably reporting on the Channel Tunnel construction. Authorship of the series, now called just "Practice & performance", has subsequently been shared by Keith Farr and John Heaton.

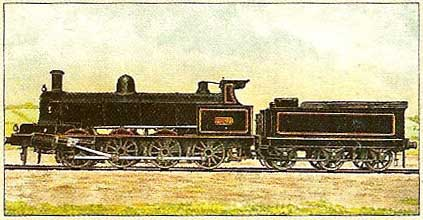
Colour frontispiece from the June 1903 Railway Magazine: No. 1881 of the London and North Western Railway, a Webb 0-8-0 four-cylinder compound.

The editor originated a series of "Illustrated Interviews" with senior railway officials, the first being Joseph Wilkinson, general manager of the Great Western Railway; another early manager to feature was John Sylvester Hughes of the Festiniog Railway. Other contributors of features in earlier days included Rev. W. J. Scott, Rev. Victor L. Whitechurch (1868–1933), Charles H. Grinling, railwayman H. L. Hopwood (1881–1927), and the much-travelled T. R. Perkins (1872–1952). Harold Fayle contributed on Irish railways (for many years it was traditional for the May issue to have a strong Irish content, with the January one having a Scottish slant). A notable series by the locomotive engineer E. L. Ahrons on "Locomotive and train working in the latter part of the nineteenth century" was published between 1915 and 1926 (and much later collected in book format). A very small amount of fiction was included in the magazine's earliest days. Another feature which has persisted since the early days has been answers to readers' questions, under the title "The why & the wherefore".

Notable photographic contributors of the Interwar period included Maurice W. Earley (1900–82), W. Leslie Good, Frank R. Hebron (died 1980), F. E. Mackay, O. J. Morris (1902–61) (who produced the first colour photograph published in the magazine, in 1938) and H. Gordon Tidey. The cover design, incorporating a photograph, remained substantially unchanged from the early 1900s to the mid-1950s; colour was first introduced there in 1963. In common with most similar magazines, the pictorial content is today largely in colour.

In earliest days, current news paragraphs were placed at the back of the magazine under the headings "What the railways are doing" and "Pertinent paragraphs"; from 1987 news was moved to the front. The magazine has also over the years steadily extended its detailed coverage of locomotive and rolling stock movements. It now covers current British railway news, modern traction, some history, heritage railways and general and international railway topics.

Between November 1963 and December 1996, the definite article was omitted from the title, which was Railway Magazine during that period. Since November 1983, the word "Magazine" has been in smaller type.

== Editors ==
Term	Editor
1897 – 1911	G. A. Sekon (1867–1948)
1911 – 1930	John F. Gairns (1876–1930)†
1932 – 1942	William Arthur Willox (1891–1970)
1942 – 1949	John Aiton Kay (1883–1949)†
1949 – 1963‡	Hugh Aymer Vallance (1902–1967)
1963 – 1966‡	John H. Court
1966 – 1970	B. W. C. Cooke
1970 – 1989	John N. Slater (1928–2004)
1989 – 1994	Peter Kelly (1944– )
1994 – 2015	Nick Pigott (1951–)
2015 – 2021	Chris Milner (1952–)
2021 –	Paul Bickerdyke

† died in office
‡ nominally Deputy Editor

== Online presence ==
The Railway Magazine has a presence on the National Preservation forums. Members and readers are able to talk and comment directly to members of the editorial staff, providing both feedback and constructive criticism. This has been noted as a valuable source of information for the magazine in order to keep in touch with its readership online in the internet age.

== See also ==
- List of railroad-related periodicals
- Rail transport in Great Britain

== Bibliography ==
- Jackson, Alan A. (2002). "George Augustus Nokes: notes for an unwritten biography". Journal of the Railway and Canal Historical Society. 34: 110–15.
- Sekon, G. A. (July–August 1947). "The start of The Railway Magazine". The Railway Magazine. Vol. 93, no. 570. pp. 197–8.
- Semmens, Peter W. B. (1996). A Century of Railways. Sparkford: Oxford Publishing Co. ISBN 0-86093-535-3.
- Semmens, Peter & Pigott, Nick (July 1997). "100 not out! – the story of The Railway Magazine". Railway Magazine. Vol. 143, no. 1155. pp. 13–19.
