= MLI =

MLI may refer to:

- .mli, OCaml module file name extension.
- Macdonald-Laurier Institute, Canadian think tank
- FIFA country code for Mali
- MedicoLegal Investigations, UK company
- MLI-84, a Romanian infantry fighting vehicle
- MLI Plus, formerly Modern Locomotives Illustrated, defunct English railway magazine
- Multilateral Convention to Implement Tax Treaty Related Measures to Prevent Base Erosion and Profit Shifting
- Multi-layer insulation, used on spacecraft
- Muslim Leadership Initiative
- Roman numeral for 1051
- Quad City International Airport, Moline, Illinois, US, IATA code
