= Model Railway Constructor =

UK magazine

Model Railway Constructor was a monthly British magazine about model railways.

== History ==
The magazine was first published on 15 March 1934. The founder was Ernest F Carter. It came into the Ian Allan Publishing fold with the take-over of Railway World Publications around 1960. John Christie, a regular contributor in the 1970s, wrote a very informative series of articles on 'The Continental Scene' many of them about German railways. It was just over 50 years old when it closed with the last edition being published in June 1987.

== Editors ==
Previous Editors include:

- R J Raymond,
- Gordon Flower,
- G.M. Kichenside c.1960–63,
- Alan Williams 1963–66,
- S.W.('Steve') Stevens-Stratten 1966–83,
- Chris Leigh 1983–87
