= Railway Express =

Railway Express may refer to:

- Rail Express - a railway magazine in the United Kingdom
- Railway Express Agency - a package delivery network in the United States
- Railway Express FC - a former football club based in Ndola in Zambia
