= MLI Plus =

- Editor: Colin J Marsden
- Former editors: Geoffrey Freeman Allen
- Categories: Rail transport
- Frequency: Bi-monthly
- Publisher: Key Publishing
- Founder: Geoffrey Freeman Allen
- First issue: 1975
- Final issue Number: November 2024; 270
- Country: England
- Based in: Stamford, Lincolnshire
- Language: English
- Website: www.mliplus.com
- ISSN: 2753-9202

MLI Plus, formerly Modern Locomotives Illustrated and Locomotives Illustrated, was a British bi-monthly railway publication published by Ian Allan Publishing and later Key Publishing.

== History ==
Locomotives Illustrated was founded in 1975 by Geoffrey Freeman Allen with the intention of creating a series of magazines, each issue dedicated to an individual class of British steam locomotive. By mid-2007, the magazine had covered almost every class of steam locomotive. Publication ceased in early-2008 after 170 issues.

Ian Allan Publishing, were keen to revamp it. Colin J Marsden, former editor of Railways Illustrated, was approached to take over the editorship and re-launch the magazine as Modern Locomotives Illustrated with a focus on modern diesel and electric locomotives and multiple units. The first edition was number 171 in May 2008.

It was included in the sale of Ian Allan Publishing's magazine business to Key Publishing in March 2012.

The publishers originally envisaged a run of 66 issues, in the end there were 100 issues. The magazine was published bi-monthly. It was rebranded MLI Plus with the first edition being number 248 in March 2021. Publication of MLI Plus ceased after the publication of issue number 270 in November 2024.
