= Locomotive, Railway Carriage & Wagon Review =

British monthly magazine

- Categories: Rail transport
- Frequency: Monthly (weekly in 1903)
- Publisher: Locomotive Publishing Co
- First issue: 1896
- Final issue: November 1959
- Country: England
- Based in: Hampton Court
- Language: British English
- OCLC: 1645111

Locomotive, Railway Carriage & Wagon Review was a British monthly magazine covering the rail transport industry. It was first published in 1896 as Moore's Monthly Magazine. After 65 years and 807 issues, it ceased in November 1959 being incorporated into sister Ian Allan Publishing publication Trains Illustrated in January 1960 which in turn became Modern Railways in January 1962.

It primarily focused on new railway locomotives and rolling stock with a combination of news and reviews. Although with an emphasis on activities in the United Kingdom, it did cover other countries, notably the Netherlands and British Colonies.
