= Cecil J. Allen =

Cecil J Allen
- Born: 1886
- Died: 5 February 1973 (aged 86–87)
- Occupation: Railway engineer
- Employers: Great Eastern Railway; London & North Eastern Railway

Cecil John Allen (1886 – 5 February 1973) was a British railway engineer and technical journalist and writer.

== Work ==
Allen qualified as a civil engineer and joined the Great Eastern Railway in 1903, later working for the London & North Eastern Railway retiring in 1946. He inspected new rails for quality.

Allen also was the second contributor to the long-running British locomotive practice and performance article series in The Railway Magazine from 1909 to 1958, He was concurrently editor of Trains Illustrated in the 1940s, and was succeeded in that position by his son, Geoffrey Freeman Allen, in 1950.

Allen was a committed Christian and an accomplished organist, writing a chorus "The Lord has need of me". He was offered a place on the train when Mallard broke the world speed record in 1938, but declined the offer as the run was scheduled for a Sunday morning and clashed with his regular church (Christian Brethren) attendance. He died on 5 February 1973.

=== Bibliography ===
He wrote numerous books on locomotives, and railway company histories, as well as an autobiography "Two Million Miles of Train Travel":

Locomotives

- The locomotive exchanges. Ian Allan Publishing. 1949.
- Locomotive practice and performance in the twentieth century (2nd revised impression ed.). Heffer, Cambridge. 1950.
- The Stanier Pacific of the L.M.S.. London. Ian Allan. 1950.
- The Gresley Pacifics of the LNER. Ian Allan. 1950.
- The Bulleid Pacifics of the Southern Region. Ian Allan. 1951.
- British Pacific locomotives. Ian Allan. 1962.
- British Atlantic locomotives. Ian Allan. 1968.
  - —; revised & enlarged by G. Freeman Allen (1976). British Atlantic locomotives (2nd ed.). Ian Allan.
- Cecil J. Allen; et al. (1972). The Deltics : a symposium. Ian Allan. ISBN 0-7110-0322-X.

Railway company histories

- The Great Eastern Railway. Ian Allan. 1955.
- The North Eastern Railway. Ian Allan. 1964.
- The London & North Eastern Railway. Ian Allan. 1966.

General railways

- The Iron Road: The Wonders of Railway Progress. John F. Shaw & Co. Ltd. 1925.
- Railways of To-day: Their Evolution, Equipment and Operation. Frederick Warne & Company. 1929.
- "The Coronation" and other famous L.N.E.R.trains. Nicholson & Watson. 1937.
- Titled trains of Great Britain. Ian Allan. 1946.
- Switzerland's Amazing Railways (4th revised ed.). Thomas Nelson & Sons, London. 1965.
- The Steel Highway. Longmans, Green & Co, London. 1928.
- Modern railways: their engineering, equipment and operation. Faber. 1959.
- Two million miles of rail travel: the autobiography of Cecil J. Allen. Ian Allan. 1965.
- Salute to the Great Western. Shepperton: Ian Allan. 1970. ISBN 0-7110-0181-2.

Other

- Hymns and the Christian faith. London, Pickering & Inglis. 1966.

== See also ==
- Geoffrey Freeman Allen, his son, also a writer on railway topics, and first editor of Modern Railways
