= FlightGlobal =

Online news website on aviation

- Official logo since July 2016

- Screenshot
- Website type: Aerospace news
- Available in: British English
- Owner: ProMedia Group UK
- Website: www.flightglobal.com
- Commercial: Yes
- Registration: Subscription required to access unlimited articles
- Launched: 2006; 20 years ago
- Current status: Online

FlightGlobal is an online news and information website which covers the aviation and aerospace industries.

== History ==
The website FlightGlobal.com was established in February 2006 as the website of Flight International magazine, Airline Business, ACAS, Air Transport Intelligence (ATI), The Flight Collection and other services and directories. It was initially branded simply as "Flight", but adopted the Flightglobal brand on 28 July 2008. It began to be stylized as FlightGlobal in July 2016.

FlightGlobal won the prize for "Business Website of the Year" at the Association of Online Publishers' Digital Publishing Awards 2010. According to the contest judges, "The site uses the full spectrum of digital tools, with a special focus on engagement and effective use of social media in a B2B [business-to-business] environment".

In 2019, RELX rebranded FlightGlobal data and analytics services to Cirium. FlightGlobal was part of Cirium, in a unit of Reed Business Information, until mid-2019, when it was acquired by DVV Media - a publisher of more than 80 brands, including magazines, newspapers, newsletters, books, directories, and websites. In August 2019, FlightGlobal and its associated divisions (except analytics and consulting divisions, which were retained by RELX as Cirium) were sold to DVV Media Group. FlightGlobal was purchased by ProMedia Group from DVV Media on 31 December 2025 along with other publications and events related to transport and human resource management.

== Publications ==
FlightGlobal publishes the weekly Flight International magazine, which marked its 110th anniversary in 2019, and established boardroom strategy title Airline Business, which entered its 35th year in 2020. It also produces multiple daily publications produced and circulated on site at air shows and key industry events globally, including the Paris and Farnborough air shows.

== Picture library ==
FlightGlobal has a picture library of over 1 million images, starting with the foundation of Flight in 1909. Thousands of images and back copies of Flight were searchable online but from June 2020 they are only available with a paid subscription to Flight Global Premium.
