= Rail Business Intelligence =

British trade magazine

- Rail Business Intelligence front page
- Editor: Robert Preston (founding editor Roger Ford)
- Categories: Rail transport
- Frequency: fortnightly
- First issue: March 1995 (as Rail Privatisation News)
- Company: DVV Media UK Ltd
- Country: United Kingdom
- Based in: Sutton
- Language: British English
- Website: RailwayGazette.com
- ISSN: 1472-5428

Rail Business Intelligence was a fortnightly subscription newsletter for senior managers, investors, lawyers, contractors, consultants, local authorities, trade unionists, manufacturers and service providers working in the United Kingdom's rail industry. After 23 years and 554 issues the final print edition was produced in March 2018, and Railway Gazette Group's UK news is now published online as Rail Business UK.

== History ==
Rail Business Intelligence was launched in March 1995 as Rail Privatisation News, with Roger Ford as founding editor. Initially conceived as a short-term project to provide inside information for financial, legal and commercial organisations taking part in the privatisation of British Rail, the Railway Gazette International newsletter saw circulation continuing to expand after the 1997 general election, and in 1998 the title was changed to Rail Business Intelligence to reflect its ongoing role in the UK's privatised rail market.

It was published every second Thursday as a printed magazine and also in PDF electronic format. Alongside contributions from Editor Robert Preston and Founding Editor Roger Ford the main Contributing Editors were Chris Jackson Murray Hughes, Nick Kingsley, Richard Hope, Andrew Grantham and Tony Miles.

The newsletter was part of the Sutton, London based Railway Gazette Group, which includes publications such as Railway Gazette International, Metro Report International and RailwayGazette.com.

== See also ==
- Railroad-related periodicals
