= Aircraft Illustrated =

- Aircraft Illustrated, April 1984.
- Categories: Aviation magazines
- Frequency: Monthly
- Founder: Ian Allan
- Founded: 1968
- Final issue: 2012
- Company: Ian Allan Publishing
- Country: United Kingdom
- Language: English
- ISSN: 0002-2675

Aircraft Illustrated was a British monthly aviation magazine covering military and civil aviation topics with an emphasis on photographic features. It was first published in 1968, renamed Aircraft in 2009 (later, Classic Aircraft) and ceased publication in 2012.

== History and profile ==
The magazine was founded in 1968 by Ian Allan Publishing. It included current civil and military aviation news, feature articles accompanied by large-scale (often colour) photography and other content aimed at the aviation enthusiast. Between 1995 and 1997 the title was extended to Aircraft Illustrated and Air Display International. In March 2008 Ben Dunnell became the editor of the magazine.

From the August 2009 issue it was renamed simply Aircraft, and it became more focused on warbirds and historic aviation. In February 2012, it was renamed again as Classic Aircraft, shortly before the title was sold to Key Publishing. After the December 2012 issue, Classic Aircraft was merged into Aviation News.

== Aircraft Illustrated Extra and Airextra ==
From 1969, a small-format quarterly companion magazine, Aircraft Illustrated Extra was published. Each issue has a single theme (usually military). In 1973 it was renamed Airextra and increased in size to A4. It ceased publication in 1986.
