= Metro Report International =

British business journal

- March 2014 issue cover
- Categories: Rail transport
- Frequency: Twice per year
- Circulation: 6500 (2014)
- First issue: 1985 (2008 as Metro Report International)
- Company: DVV Media Group
- Country: Worldwide
- Based in: Sutton, England
- Language: British English
- Website: www.metro-report.com

Metro Report International is a business journal for urban transport professionals which covers the metro, light rail, tram and commuter rail industries worldwide. It includes news and articles looking at urban transport around the world, with maps and project data. Coverage of the rolling stock market includes detailed listings of metro car and low-floor tram orders. News is published online, with the printed magazine issued twice per year.

== History ==
Metro Report International began as Developing Metros, which was launched in 1985 as an annual supplement to Railway Gazette International. Developing Metros was renamed Metro Report in 1998, and to Metro Report International in 2008.

Metro Report International is part of the Railway Gazette Group within DVV Media Group, which is part of the Hamburg-based Deutsche Verkehrs Verlag group.

== See also ==
- Railway Gazette International
- Rail Business Intelligence
