= George Augustus Nokes =

British magazine editor (1867–1948)

- Born: 5 January 1867; Hammersmith, England
- Died: 19 February 1948 (aged 81)
- Other name: G.A. Sekon
- Education: Hayes College
- Family: Frances Steel; Walter Nokes

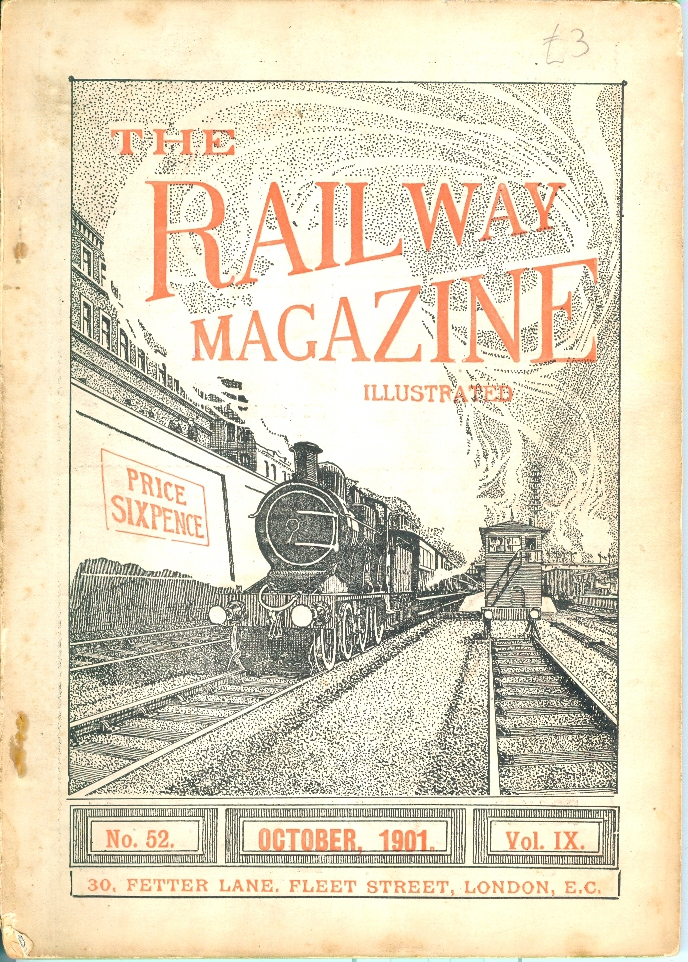
The Railway Magazine for October 1901 (Vol. IX, no. 52), edited by G.A. Sekon

George Augustus Nokes (1867–1948), often known by his pen-name G.A. Sekon, was the founding editor of The Railway Magazine.

== Biography ==
Nokes was born on 5 January 1867 at Hammersmith, to Frances Steel and Walter William Samuel Nokes; he was the seventh of their eight children, and their youngest son. Among his brothers were Malcolm Cuthbert Nokes, olympic athlete, soldier and chemist, and Gerald Dacre Nokes, law professor and Indian circuit judge. As a child he was invited to have a ride in the cab of a 2-4-0 locomotive of the London, Chatham and Dover Railway at Margate. He was educated as a boarder at Hayes College, and upon leaving there, joined the family firm of land agents and auctioneers; their offices were close to King's Cross station in London, and then at 20 Ironmonger Lane, in the city.

In 1891, the firm were to auction a bundle of old copies of the journal Railway Herald; noticing these, and never having heard of this particular journal, Nokes bought the bundle. Soon, he was one of the journal's contributors. The Railway Herald was run by Frank Cornwall, who also owned the Railway Herald Magazine, which consisted mainly of reprints from Railway Herald. In 1897, Cornwall noticed that sales of Railway Herald Magazine were increasing, and decided that it should become a proper magazine in its own right, with original articles instead of reprints, and be aimed at rail enthusiasts - or "railwayacs" as they were then known. Accordingly, he decided that for the relaunch as The Railway Magazine, an editor was required who was also a railwayac, and he chose Nokes. The first issue was dated July 1897, and it was published on the first of that month. Nokes continued to work for the family business, and wished his two jobs to be unconnected; so he adopted the pen-name "G.A. Sekon" (his surname spelled backwards) for his magazine work.

In December 1909, Cornwall died; his successor was W. Parker. The last issue of The Railway Magazine that Nokes edited was that of February 1910 (vol. XXVI, no. 152). In that month, he had a disagreement with Parker and the magazine's proprietor, Sir Joseph Lawrence, over his editorial style, and resigned.

After leaving The Railway Magazine, Nokes started another magazine, The Railway and Travel Monthly, which he owned himself; the first issue appeared in May 1910. It was a direct competitor with The Railway Magazine, but always on friendly terms.

Following the First World War, both The Railway Magazine and The Railway and Travel Monthly were purchased by John Aiton Kay, who already owned The Railway Gazette. Nokes remained as Editor of The Railway and Travel Monthly, which was renamed Transport and Travel Monthly in April 1920; but it only lasted until Nokes's retirement at the end of 1922, following which it was merged into The Railway Magazine from the January 1923 issue.

Nokes had ten grandchildren and 14 great-grandchildren. He died on 19 February 1948.
