= H. Gordon Tidey =

Herbert Gordon Tidey (1879-1971) was an English railway photographer. Described as "one of the fathers of railway photography" he was active from the 1890s through the 1950s.

Writing in 1954, he described the background to his work as follows:

From about 1900 onwards, I have made a point of giving a week annually to a tour devoted entirely to Railway Photography, on some occasions by car, but, when long distances were involved, by train... During these 54 odd years I suppose I must have covered a large part of England and Scotland. I visited many interesting districts on several occasions – with a few years' gap between – and therefore was able to record the changing outline of the locomotives on the important trains.

Oxenholme station is an example of a favourite location, but Tidey did indeed range widely, and it is estimated that he took around 6000 photographs. Characteristically he took ¾-front views of mainline steam trains in action, taking care to include the complete train in the composition, favouring a high viewpoint when he could obtain one, and sometimes deliberately choosing to shoot from the shadow side of the line. By the middle of his photographic career he preferred to use a Delnollo Nettel focal plane press camera taking glass plates.

His work was published in The Railway Magazine from 1902; in the Interwar period "he often attained the place of honour – the full page frontispiece." However, from 1910 to 1919, his work appeared instead in The Railway Magazine's rival, Railway and Travel Monthly, which also sold his work as prints.

At times in his career he sold postcard prints of his photographs himself or through Oldlands of Palmers Green or "B[rightman] & R[ushton]" of London. He suspended photographic activity during World War II; afterwards copies of his pictures were sold by Real Photographs Co., Ian Allan and Lens of Sutton. Most of his glass plates are now with the National Railway Museum, York; some are held by RAS Publishing.

By profession he was an estate agent in North London, also contributing photographs to the local Southgate Recorder newspaper and being an amateur musician.
