= Roger Ford (journalist) =

British journalist

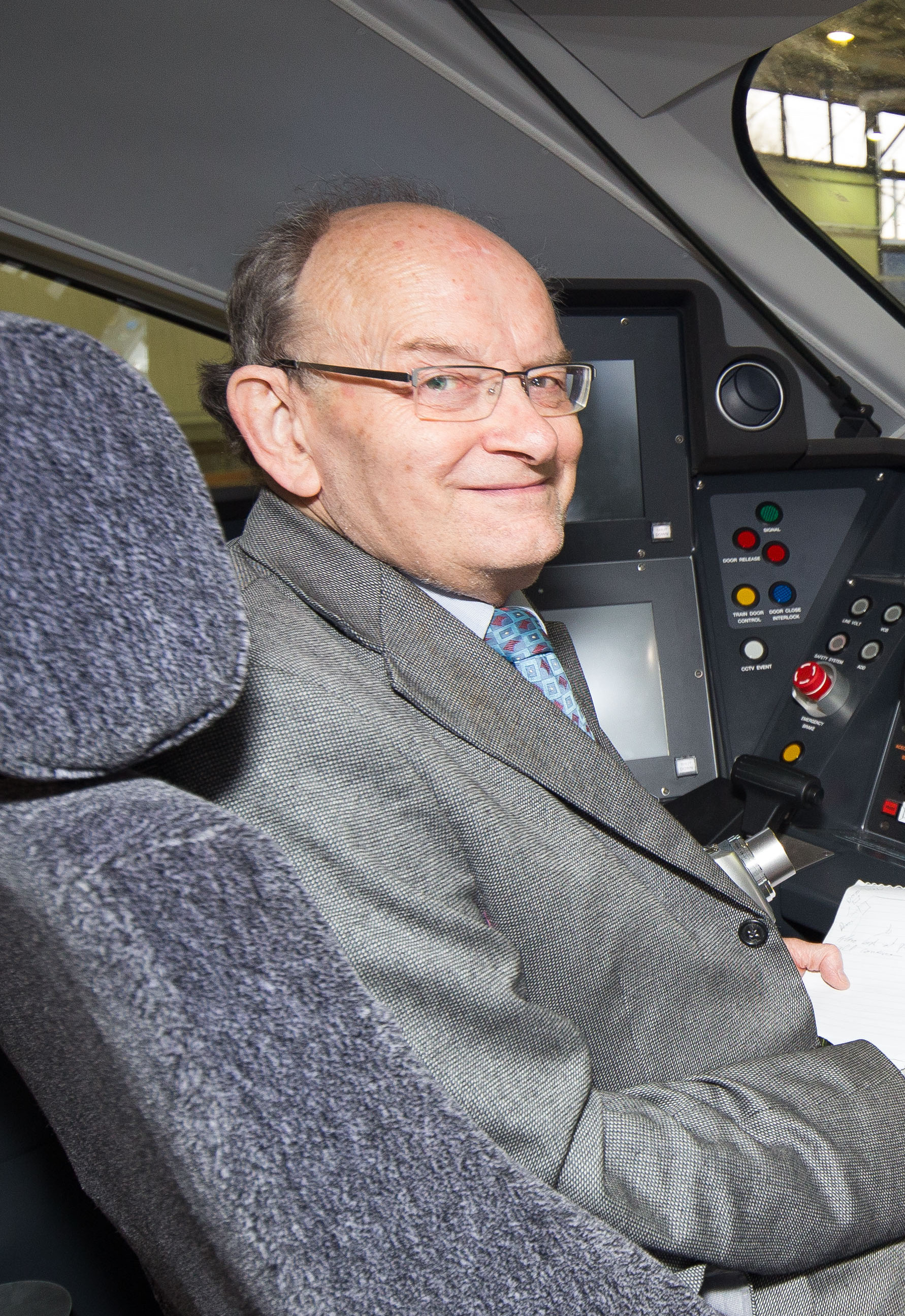
- In the cab of class 800002 at North Pole Train Maintenance Centre, 2015
- Born: United Kingdom
- Occupation: Railway journalist
- Years active: 1976–present
- Known for: Modern Railways

Roger Ford is a British journalist specialising in rail transport. He is Industry and Technology Editor of the monthly trade and technical magazine Modern Railways, where he is probably best known for his column Informed Sources, noted for its in-depth analysis of railway technical, commercial and policy issues. He is also founding editor of Rail Business Intelligence.

== Biography ==
Ford trained as a mechanical engineer with English Electric at Rugby, specialising in prime movers, and on qualification joined the head office of the company’s Traction Division. While at English Electric Traction he was seconded to the Maintenance Division, spending time at Finsbury Park and Stratford locomotive depots.

He subsequently pursued a career in industrial publicity management, with British Standards, Chloride Group and Fairey, before deciding to become a full-time writer in 1976, specialising in railways. In the 1980s he also edited the Institution of Mechanical Engineers Railway Division's quarterly technical journal Railway Engineer and the Railway Industry Association's Railpower magazine, promoting the UK rail industry abroad.

With the start of privatisation of British Rail in 1993 Ford began a parallel career as an independent consultant, with clients including the former Office of Passenger Rail Franchising and a number of leading banks and leasing organisations. He has also presented technical and commercial papers to a wide range of learned societies and industry conferences.

In March 1995 he became the founding editor of the fortnightly subscription newsletter Rail Privatisation News, created to provide inside information for financial, legal and commercial organisations taking part in the privatisation of British Rail. Initially conceived as a short-term project linked to the privatisation programme, the Railway Gazette International newsletter saw circulation continuing to expand after the 1997 general election, and in 1998 the title was changed to Rail Business Intelligence to reflect its ongoing role.

To support his writing activities Roger Ford launched his own website Alycidon Rail (named after the British Rail Class 55 locomotive). This provides on-line resources including archives, research material and an acronym translator. The e-Preview newsletter offers a monthly e-mail outlining the contents of the next Informed Sources column in Modern Railways, developments since the column went to press and a short blog. The 500th edition of Informed Sources was published August 2024.

== Writing style and media appearances ==
Roger appeared on the Equinox TV programme series on Channel 4 entitled "Running to time" in 1988. He has also appeared before the government Transport Select Committee on several occasions. His style can be scathing and he is credited with inventing the term "Bionic Duckweed."

He also came up with the idea of Informed Sources Laws which are an irreverent and tongue-in-cheek way of looking at railways but also based on experience. They are:

- First Law ‘Never assume railways are rational organisations’
- Second Law ‘You can’t have too many spanners’
- Third Law ‘Always mistrust schedules based on the seasons’
- Fourth Law ‘When in doubt – build a demonstrator’
- Fifth Law ‘Any change to a prototype will be for the worst’
- Sixth Law ‘Don’t engage in joint ventures with the French’
- Seventh Law ‘The attractiveness of technology is directly proportional to the square of the distance of its factory of origin from London’
- Eighth Law ‘Nothing works out of the box’
- Ninth Law ‘Do not try to solve physical design shortcomings with software’
- Tenth Law ‘If something has to be claimed as declared “world-beating” it almost certainly isn’t’
- Eleventh Law ‘A claim that “safety is our first priority” or “safety is paramount” usually follows an event that proves it isn’t and ignores the reality of ALARP
- Twelfth Law 'If an innovation is categorised as First Of A Kind it almost certainly isn’t'

== Awards ==
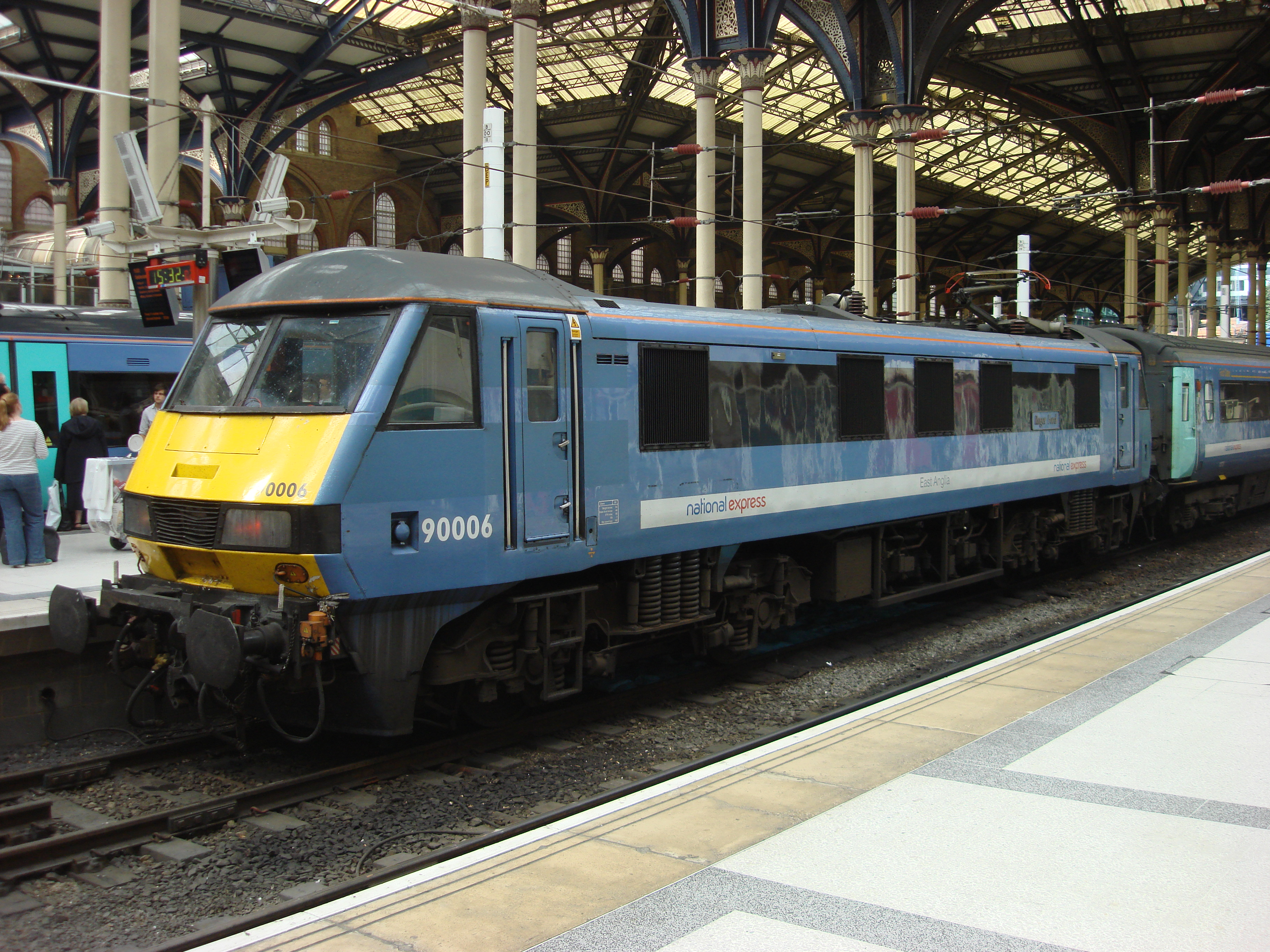
90006 at Liverpool Street

Roger Ford was the Chartered Institute of Transport's Journalist of the Year in 1993 and received the same award from the Chartered Institute of Logistics & Transport in 2003. He is a Chartered Member of the Institute of Logistics & Transport and an Associate of the Institution of Railway Signal Engineers.

Class 90 locomotive 90006 is named Roger Ford on one side, and Modern Railways on the other.
