= Classic Bike Guide =

Monthly motorcycle magazine based in England

- Editor: Matt Hull
- Former editors: Nigel Clark, Tim Britton, Frank Westworth, Steve Rose
- Categories: Motorcycles
- Frequency: Monthly
- Circulation: 89,036 (2008)
- Publisher: Steve Rose
- Founded: 1991
- Company: Mortons Media Group Ltd
- Country: United Kingdom
- Based in: Horncastle Lincolnshire
- Language: English
- Website: Classic Bike Guide
- ISSN: 0959-7123

Classic Bike Guide is a monthly motorcycle magazine based in Horncastle, Lincolnshire, England.

== History ==
Launched in 1991 and edited by Frank Westworth, Classic Bike Guide mainly features original specification British motorcycles with occasional articles on foreign marques and one-off 'specials'. Under Westworth, a regular team of writers including Jim Reynolds, Steve Wilson and Rod Kerr penned many of these articles. Mortons Motorcycle Media Ltd acquired the magazine in January 2003. Edited from 2003 by Tim Britton until September 2008, Nigel Clark until August 2012, it was then edited by Steve Rose until Gary Pinchin took the reins in March 2013. The magazine was given a fresh look and relaunched for the March 2013 issue. Matt Hull is editor since 2017.

== Features ==
The magazine features detailed road tests of classic motorcycles and articles on readers bikes, as well as:

- We were there — reviews of classic bike rallies and events
- How to... — technical advice, tips and techniques
- Trading Post — classic bikes for sale, events, product and book reviews
- Classic Club Guide — comprehensive listing of UK classic motorcycle clubs
