= Malcolm Nokes =

British athlete

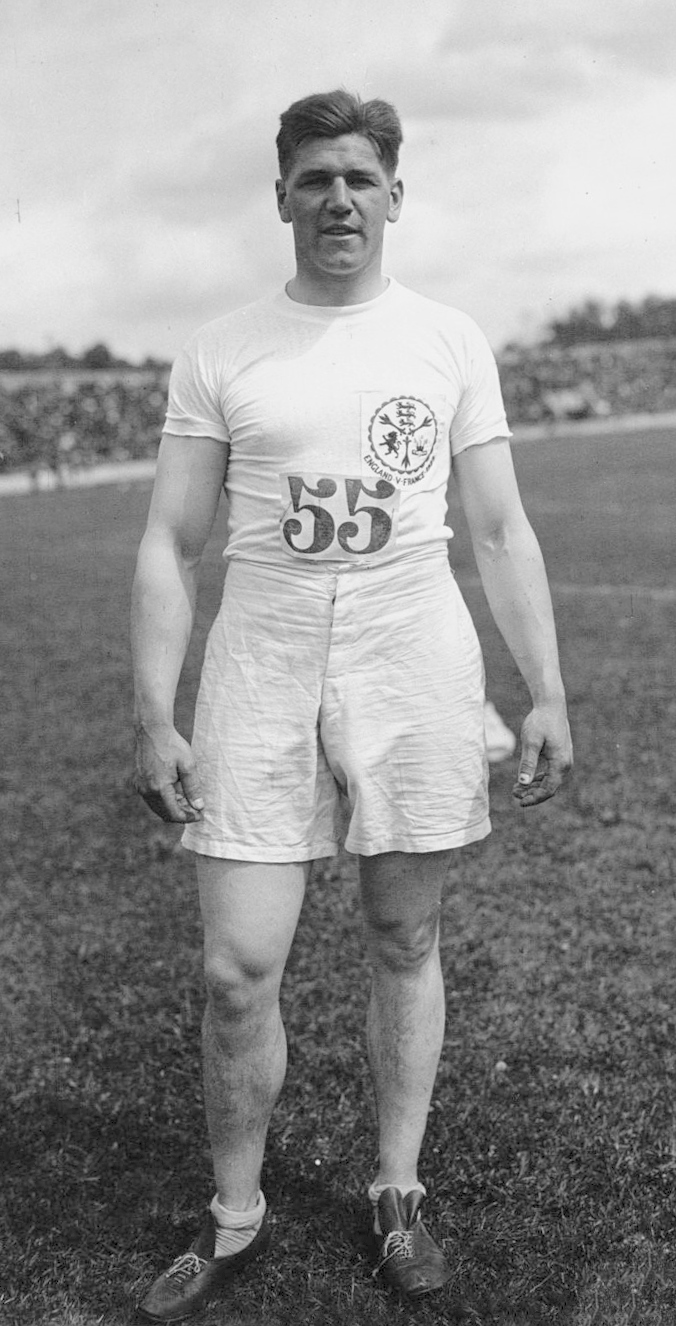
- Malcolm Nokes in 1923

Personal information
- Born: 20 May 1897 Edmonton, Middlesex, Great Britain
- Died: 22 November 1986 (aged 89) Alton, Hampshire, England

Sport
- Sport: Athletics
- Events: Discus throw, hammer throw
- Club: University of Oxford AC; Achilles Club

Achievements and titles
- Personal bests: DT – 38.43 m (1927); HT – 52.75 m (1923)
Medal record
Representing Great Britain
Olympics
Bronze medal – third place	1924 Paris	Hammer throw
Representing England
British Empire Games
Gold medal – first place	1930 Hamilton	Hammer throw
Gold medal – first place	1934 London	Hammer throw

Malcolm Cuthbert Nokes MC MA BSc (20 May 1897 – 22 November 1986) was a British schoolteacher, soldier, research scientist and Olympic athlete, who competed in the hammer throw and discus throw.

== Biography ==
He won the bronze medal in the hammer throw at the 1924 Summer Olympics. Four years later he finished eleventh in the 1928 Olympic hammer throw competition. In 1923 he beat the British hammer throw record, but did so in a demonstration rather than a competition, so his throw did not count for record purposes.

He won the gold medal for England in the 1930 British Empire Games in the hammer throw contest and finished fifth in the discus throw event. At the 1934 British Empire Games he won again the gold medal in the hammer throw competition.

Nokes was the Amateur Athletic Association (AAA) Champion from 1923 to 1926 and placed second at the 1921 AAA Championships and 1922 AAA Championships and 1927–28. He was chairman of the AAA's Coaching Committee, and also a member of the Achilles Club.

He was a graduate of Magdalen College, Oxford, where he studied chemistry and wrote a thesis on metaphenetidine. Nokes served in the Great War in the Royal Artillery in the trenches and then as an observer in the Royal Flying Corps. He was awarded a Military Cross for his service, becoming MC Nokes MC. In the Second World War he served as an officer in the Royal Air Force Volunteer Reserve (Training Branch) while a schoolmaster.

He taught chemistry at Malvern College and later at Harrow School, where he was appointed Head of Science; he had come to the attention of Harrow when two schools colocated during the Second World War, although they did not merge. His practical demonstrations of the reaction of sodium with water were popular and famous among his pupils. These often entailed an explosion as MC Nokes put more than the recommended quantity of sodium into the water, and as the smoke cleared and noise subsided, MC Nokes would say "Note the small report." He was a member of the Science Masters' Association. Later he worked at Harwell and then was Head of Laboratories at CENTO Institute of Nuclear & Applied Science in Tehran. In retirement he lived in Honiton, Devon, and then in Alton, Hampshire. His nicknames included "Nokey", "Glaxo" and "Stally."

The chronology of his career was:

- 1909—16 schoolboy at Bishop's Stortford College (School House A)
- 1916—18 Royal Garrison Artillery (RGA) & Royal Flying Corps (RFC), served on the Western Front. (August 1917 awarded MC)
- 1918—19 Royal Air Force, served on the Western Front
- 1921 Completed the shortened course in Chemistry at Oxford University, Magdalen College, with a distinction
- 1923 Awarded BSc. Chemistry, Oxford University, Magdalen College
- 1922—46 Malvern College, science teacher & head of department. (Housemaster 1932–40)
- 1946—57 Harrow School
- 1957—59 Atomic Energy Research Establishment, Harwell (Isotope Division)
- 1959—66 CENTO Institute of Nuclear Science, Tehran, with status of Third Secretary in the British Embassy, Tehran
- 1966—69 Tehran University Institute of Nuclear Science

During his time at Harrow, he served as a councillor in what is now Harrow London Borough Council, being elected as a Conservative for the ward of Harrow-on-the-Hill & Greenhill. During his service as a borough councillor, he proposed and was instrumental in bringing into service one of the first electric dust carts to be used in England, as part of the modernization of public health services in Harrow.

MC Nokes was one of eight children of Walter Nokes. His brothers included Gerald Dacre Nokes, a barrister and Indian judge, and George Augustus Nokes.

== Publications ==
- Modern Glass-working and laboratory techniques. London, 1937: William Heinemann.
- Simple Experiments in the theory of flight. London, 1941: William Heinemann.
- "Aircraft instruments" in Air training manual; a practical guide to aero-engines, aircraft construction, wireless and electricity, and air navigation for members of the A. T. C. and all interested in modern aeronautics. London, 1943: Odhams Press.
- Science in education. London, 1949: Macdonald.
- Demonstrations in modern physics. London, 1952: William Heinemann.
- "Throwing the Hammer" (with Lt. Col. C. J. Reidy) in Athletics, by Members of the Achilles Club. (Ed.: Meyer, HM). London, 1955: JM Dent & Sons.
- Radioactivity measuring instruments: a guide to their construction and use. Melbourne, 1958: William Heinemann.
