= Mortons of Horncastle =

Brish publishing company

Mortons of Horncastle Ltd

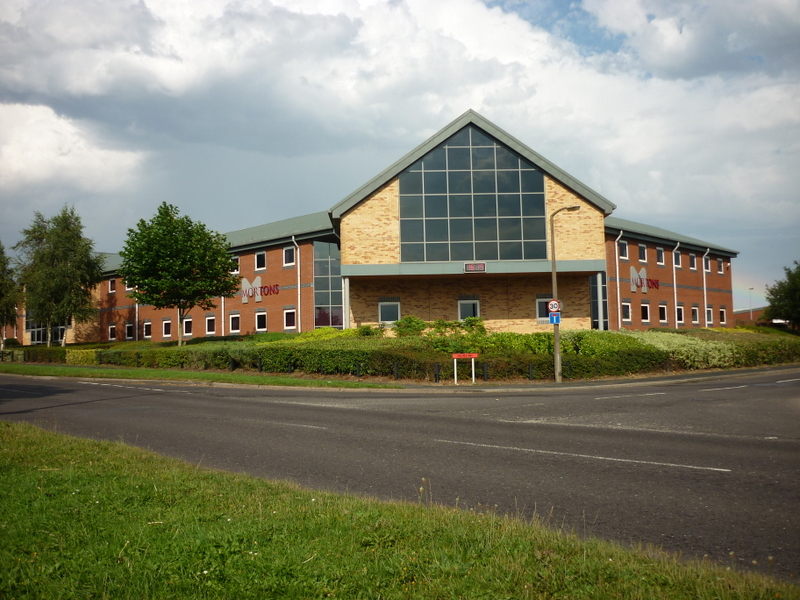
- Headquarters building in Horncastle, Lincolnshire, UK
- Industry: Publishing and printing
- Founded: 1885
- Founder: William Kirkham Morton
- Headquarters: Horncastle, England, UK
- Area served: UK, Ireland
- Key people: Philip Sharpe (Chairman and CEO)
- Products: Hobbyist magazines, newspapers, events and exhibitions
- Services: Contract printing
- Subsidiaries: Mortons Media Group
- Website: www.mortonsofhorncastle.co.uk

Mortons of Horncastle Ltd is a publishing, events and printing company based in Horncastle in East Lindsey, Lincolnshire, England.

== History ==
At the age of 21, William Kirkham Morton introduced mechanical typesetting to the small market-town of Horncastle, Lincolnshire, when he founded Mortons of Horncastle. He started the Horncastle News in 1887. The company eventually collapsed after Morton's death in 1935, but the bankrupt remains were bought by Market Rasen journalist Charles Edward Sharpe in the late 1950s. He consolidated his various assets and Mortons of Horncastle was revived as a printer and publisher of several Lincolnshire regional newspapers.

In 1980 it started the Louth Leader and in 1985, the Skegness News. In 1999, it divided into three separate companies – Mortons Media Group, Mortons Print and Mortons Motorcycle Media.

In February 2001 the company sold its Lincolnshire Independent Newspaper Group to Welland Valley Newspapers to concentrate purely on hobbyist magazine publishing, events and exhibitions and contract printing. Its former titles, and those of the former Lincoln Standard Group, are now owned by Johnston Press.

With its four divisions – publishing, events, print and mailing – its operations now fall under the banner of Mortons Media Group. The company employs around 250 staff and achieved the Investors in People standard in 1997.

== Divisions ==
=== Mortons Media Group Ltd ===
Mortons Media Group – a subsidiary company of Mortons of Horncastle – produces a range of hobbyist magazine titles and newspapers, organisers several major exhibitions, offers contract print and mailing services and houses a motorcycle and heritage image and publication archive.

=== Publishing ===
Having been involved in regional newspaper production for more than 40 years, in the mid-1990s Mortons began publishing hobbyist titles with the purchase of motorcycle newspaper Old Bike Mart. The acquisition of several more motorcycle-related titles followed, as did titles covering gardening, traction engines, classic American cars and scooters. Mortons also publishes The Railway Magazine – first produced in 1897, the title celebrated its 120th anniversary in 2017.

Current print publishing portfolio:

- Back Street Heroes
- Classic American
- Classic Bike Guide
- Classic Dirt Bike
- Classic Motorcycle Mechanics
- Classic Racer
- Classic Scooterist
- Fast Bikes
- Heritage Railway
- Kitchen Garden
- Motorcycle Sport & Leisure
- Motor Cycle Monthly
- Old Bike Mart
- On 2 Wheels
- Rail Express
- Railways Illustrated
- RealClassic
- Scootering
- Steam Days
- The Classic MotorCycle
- The Railway Magazine
- Towpath Talk

==== Bookazines ====
Mortons publishes between 20-25 one-off magazine editions each year known as bookazines. These cover a variety of subjects often linked to major historical events and anniversaries.

==== Online ====
Supporting its printed publication range, Mortons produces various online products and digital platforms including motorcycle news websites MoreBikes and O2W, and Kitchen Garden.

=== Events ===
Mortons organises and promotes more than 30 individual events:

- 'Normous Newark Autojumble, Newark Showground (x 10)
- The Kempton Park Motorcycle Autojumbles, Kempton Park racecourse (x 7)
- The Carole Nash Classic Bike Guide Winter Classic, Newark Showground
- The Carole Nash Bristol Classic MotorCycle Show, Bath and West Showground
- The Footman James Great Western Classic Car Show, Bath and West Showground
- The Classic Dirt Bike Show Sponsored by Hagon Shocks, Telford International Centre
- The Carole Nash International Classic MotorCycle Show, Staffordshire County Showground
- The Footman James Bristol Classic Car Show, Bath and West Showground
- The Carole Nash Eurojumble, Netley Marsh
- The Carole Nash Classic Mechanics Show, Staffordshire County Showground
- The International Dirt Bike Show in partnership with MOTUL, Staffordshire County Showground
- The Footman James Classic Vehicle Restoration Show, Bath and West Showground

=== Mortons Print ===
Printing has been the heartbeat of Mortons since it was founded, and the current company's Print division produces a number of weekly newspapers and one-off/regular of contract jobs. Its printing press was originally housed at the Horncastle News building in the centre of the town, but by 1979 it had outgrown the facility and moved to new premises on Boston Road Industrial Site where Mortons' main HQ still sits today. Mortons Print is a regular entrant at the annual news awards, and in 2016 its work on Fishing News was recognised with the title named Niche Market Newspaper of the Year at a ceremony in London.

=== Mortons Mailing ===
In January 2010 Mortons announced the acquisition of Lincolnshire Mailing Company to add capabilities encompassing polywrapping and lettering services to its services. Lincolnshire Mailing Company had been a long-standing supplier to the Mortons Media Group for more than 15 years and had relocated its operation to factory units within the Mortons site in 2004.

=== Mortons Archive ===
Comprising the historical archives of The Motor Cycle and Motor Cycling, Mortons Archive contains more than four million images dating back the earliest days of motorcycle development.
