= National Preservation =

Website for railway enthusiasts

National Preservation (Nat Pres Ltd)
- Type: Private
- Industry: Railways
- Genre: Online
- Founded: 25 June 2008
- Founder: Glyn Murray
- Headquarters: UK
- Area served: WorldWide
- Products: Retail and discussion among railway enthusiasts
- Owner: Glyn Murray (Forum Owner-Conrad Windham)
- Number of employees: 5 volunteers
- Website: http://www.national-preservation.com

National Preservation is the trading name for Nat Pres Ltd, a British-based online company that specialises in retail and discussion among railway enthusiasts. The company was created on 25 June 2008 as an extension of the original National Preservation forum, which began on 10 March 2005, and has since moved to its own server. Nat Pres Ltd soon expanded beyond the original forum by running RailTours-Live that is now no longer operational. However, its popular 'What's Going On' section continues to provide useful links to other sites where Rail Tour information is published including commentaries on extant tours plus links to national train information such as Real Time Trains.

The company was run by Glyn Murray, who managed the entire website and was the CEO. Other directors were Alexandra Murray. The forum is maintained by a team of volunteers acting as moderators, settling disputes and ensuring users stay within the pre-determined forum rules.

The company has forged a working relationship with Steam Railway and The Railway Magazine, two of the biggest selling railway periodicals in the United Kingdom, thus expanding the forum's audience, and attracting input from professionals within the railway preservation movement. The forum also hosts representatives from the National Railway Museum to discuss matters relating to their individual areas of expertise as well as providing them with a platform to promote their various publications or institutions.

In February 2018 the Forum was sold by the founder, Glyn Murray, to Conrad Windham who is the owner and director of Flamethrower Ltd. Since this sale the Forum has largely been allowed to continue to operate as before and members have benefited from less 'down-time' of the site and greater accessibility via a more robust server. Whilst this has necessarily involved higher levels of marketing and targeted advertising to raise income, members are able to opt out of this through a modest membership fee.

== Forum ==
The online forum is where most of the publicly viewable activity takes place. It was the first tangible sign of the company on the internet. It began as a purely free online forum, however has since grown into the formation of the company Nat Pres Limited. The original forum now serves as both a discussion board and as a place where various special events or mainline railtours by heritage railways and mainline tour operators can be promoted. There is now a regular flow of information and news from some of the major players in the UK railway preservation sector. These include the A1 Steam Locomotive Trust, the 82045 Trust and the group aiming to rebuild a GWR Grange locomotive, no. 6880 Betton Grange, as well as many smaller groups, trusts and societies. This is in addition to many ordinary members of the various heritage railways in the UK, from some of the largest, such as the Severn Valley Railway, Bluebell Railway and North Yorkshire Moors Railway, to some of the smallest.

The forum first came to mass attention during 2006, with an incident involving British Railways 4MT no. 76079 on Exeter Bank, near Exeter Central station, when the locomotive slipped to a stand on a railtour. The forum became a centre for the activity on that day, as news broke of the incident and reaction given from various sources, including the locomotive owner Ian Riley. This led to the forum being cited in the report on the incident in Steam Railway magazine by David Wilcock, the first example of the importance of the website being recognised by major players in the railway preservation movement.

As of 17 February 2009, the forum has 3,833 members, who between them have posted over a quarter of a million articles to the forum. On average, the forum has gained about 160 members per month since the start of 2009. The forum has added roughly 1,000 to its membership year on year since its formation in 2005.

Year Ending	Forum membership
31/12/2005	400
31/12/2006	1,158
31/12/2007	2,182
31/12/2008	3,528
31/12/2009	7,945
31/12/2010	11,394
31/12/2011	13,643
31/12/2012	15,934
31/12/2013	21,124
31/12/2014	23,237
31/12/2015	24,973
31/12/2016	26,623
31/12/2017	

The badge produced to help support the website

== Impact ==
In 2007, the forum members raised funds for the Welsh Highland Railway appeal to restore their original engine Russell, following a poll among users over which of several candidates should receive the donation. The funds were raised through individual donations, as well as subscriptions and proceeds from the shop, A newsletter by the Welsh Highland Railway was produced to celebrate the event.

National Preservation was used in helping the Betton Grange society publicise their major gala "Steel, Steam and Stars" in April 2007, held at the Llangollen Railway. The forum was used by the group to post details of the gala as they were confirmed and to provide information and reports on the event afterwards. For the follow-up gala in 2009, the forum has been utilised in a similar way, but has also been used to help provide volunteers for jobs during the event, and the company is sponsoring the running of specific trains and a guest ale at the beer festival held alongside the gala.

National Preservation was also used in helping with the new Churnet Valley Railway& Moorland & City Railways Cauldon Lowe Branch re-opening Gala. On the weekend of the 13/14 November 2010. The forum had the first 12 coach express beer train to run on the new Cauldon Lowe Branch, sporting the National Preservation headboard.

For a spell during 2007, Steam Railway magazine actively ran a feature on the forum. Entitled "Overheard at the bar", the section reprinted a selection of some of the best posts from the forum during that month, chosen jointly by Danny Hopkins and Glyn Murray. These covered issues such as steam locomotive history and other sundry events within the movement such as railtours.

It is believed that National Preservation is the first forum to have its own Locomotive Headboard cast.

== Criticism ==
Among the criticism leveled at the website has been the perceived lack of understanding among members on many areas, often calling them "armchair enthusiasts"

Another criticism which has been made of the forum is the large number of members who are not active volunteers, often despite being members of at least one preservation society. Others, however, believe it provides a cross-section of the enthusiast movement, with some working members, but also railway photographers, videographers, backroom staff and general enthusiasts.
