= Nick Pigott =

British magazine editor

- Born: Nicholas Hugh Pigott; 1951 (age 74–75); Barnby Moor, Nottinghamshire, England
- Citizenship: British
- Writing career
- Genres: Newspaper Journalist, variously Editor of: Steam Railway; Traction magazine; and The Railway Magazine
- Notable awards: IPC Media's Specialist Writer of the Year, 2002.

Nicholas Hugh Pigott (born 1951) is the Consultant Editor of The Railway Magazine, Britain's best-selling rail title. He was Editor for 21 years between 1994 and 2015, having previously worked in Fleet Street as a journalist for the Daily Express.

== Biography ==
Pigott was born in 1951 at Barnby Moor, Nottinghamshire. and educated at Bromsgrove School.

He trained on the Lincolnshire Standard, Nottingham Evening Post, and Birmingham Post before joining the Daily Express in 1975 and entered railway journalism after 12 years in Fleet Street. He was Editor of Steam Railway magazine, a post held for four years, and then launch editor of Traction magazine, before moving to be the editor of The Railway Magazine in August 1994.

In 2002, he was voted IPC Media's Specialist Writer of the Year and in 2008 was shortlisted in the national Editor of the Year awards held by the British Society of Magazine Editors. On 22 March 2007, The Railway Magazine won the top prize at IPC Media's Editorial Awards ceremony. Competition for this award was limited to specialist titles within IPC Media selling up to 40,000 copies per month. One week later, on 29 March 2007, the magazine's marketforce team won the Gold Cup awarded by the Association of Circulation Executives.

== The Railway Magazine and Steam Railway ==
The Railway Magazine was a long-running monthly railway magazine dating back to July 1897, but in 1988, whilst under the Editorship of John N. Slater (1970–1989), lost its position as "best-selling rail title." That went to a younger competitor, Steam Railway magazine, founded nine years earlier under the launch Editor David Wilcock. Wilcock was followed as Editor by Nick Pigott. By the early 1990s, Steam Railway was outselling The Railway Magazine by upwards of 10,000 copies per month. Slater's successor Peter Kelly (1989–1994) attempted to reduce the sales gap, and that work was continued under his successor, Nick Pigott; who by then had moved over from Steam Railway. In 2008, The Railway Magazine regained its position as Britain's best-selling rail title and had continued to increase its circulation ever since. Its current publisher is Mortons Media, which bought the title from IPC Media in August 2010.

== Books ==
- Pigott, Nick (2022). The Rise and Fall of King Coal. Gresley Books.
- —— (2012). The Encyclopaedia of Titled Trains. Mortons Media.
- —— (2010). Keith Pirt Colour Portfolio: Grantham. Book Law Publications.
- —— (2008). Fifty Great British Locomotives. IPC Media.
- —— (1990). Steam Railway Book of the Year. Emap.
- —— (1982). Gresley Locomotive Album. Bradford Barton.
