= Railway Gazette Group =

British rail transport publisher

The Railway Gazette Group is a family of print and online business publications for the world rail transport industry. Based in Sutton, London, it is part of ProMedia UK.

== Publications ==
- Railway Gazette International: English-language business magazine for railway, metro and light rail operators and suppliers.
- Rail Business UK: news from the UK railway industry.

== Former publications ==
- Railway Gazette International Chinese Edition – articles from Railway Gazette International translated into Mandarin in association with the Institute of Scientific & Technical Information of China.
- Rail Business Intelligence: fortnightly newsletter which reported on the privatised UK railway industry.
- Metro Report International: developments in the urban rail sector, ranging from tram and light rail to metro and suburban railway networks.
- Railway Directory: an annual catalogue of industry references and contacts.

== Other ==
- Rail Business Awards

== See also ==
- List of railroad-related periodicals
