= G. Freeman Allen =

English rail transport writer (1922–1995)

Geoffrey Freeman Allen (16 March 1922 – 7 July 1995) was an English author specialising in the field of railways. He authored many books and magazine articles on this subject, and for a time was editor of Jane's World Railways. His name was usually styled G. Freeman Allen. Greater Anglia used to operate a class 321 electric multiple unit named “Geoffrey Freeman Allen”.

== Life and career ==
Born in England in 1922, Geoffrey Freeman Allen was the son of Cecil J. Allen who was also a writer on railways and was editor of the magazine Trains Illustrated in the late 1940s. Geoffrey left a career in the British Army in 1948 to join the writing staff at Trains Illustrated, and in 1950 succeeded his father as editor. He developed a new style of railway journalism which focused more on business than on train performance and technological innovation and design. Under his lengthy tenure the magazine was rebranded to its current name, Modern Railways. He also served as editor of Railways World for many years.

Allen eventually left his role as editor to become the managing director of the publishing firm Ian Allan Ltd., the publisher of Modern Railways and other magazines and books. Uncomfortable in this role, he stepped down after a few years to take the position of editor of Jane's World Railways. He retired from that position in 1992, but continued to contribute as writer after. He died in 1995.

== Publications ==
- Modern Railways magazine – first editor (and final editor of its predecessor, Trains Illustrated).
- Allen, G. Freeman (1959). British Railways today and tomorrow. Ian Allan.
- Allen, G. Freeman (1982). Great Railway Photographs by Eric Treacy. London: Peerage Books.
- Whitehouse, P. B.; Allen, G. Freeman (1982). Eric Treacy: Railway Photographer. Newton Abbott: David and Charles. ISBN 0-7153-8367-1.
- Geoffrey Freeman Allen (April–May 1983). "The Warship Story". Rail Enthusiast. pp. 6, 23.
- G. Freeman Allen (1981). Modern Railways International Review. Ian Allan, London. ISBN 0-7110-1123-0
