= Carole Nash =

Motorcycle insurance broker in the UK & Ireland

Carole Nash Insurance Consultants Ltd
- Company type: Wholly owned subsidiary
- Industry: Finance and Insurance
- Founded: 1985
- Headquarters: Salford, United Kingdom
- Key people: Carole Nash, Founder
- Products: Financial services
- Parent: Ardonagh Group
- Website: www.carolenash.com

Carole Nash is a British insurance brokerage based in Salford, England. The company provides insurance cover for motorcycles, classic cars and performance vehicles, as well as campervans.

== History ==
In 1985 Carole Nash founded Carole Nash Insurance Consultants Ltd. The company's first headquarters were located at Nash's own family home in Timperley, with business operations run from her kitchen table. She was 44 years old. Originally set up to look after the interests of vintage motorcycle owners, the business expanded to cover all types of motorbikes. By 1995, following a sustained period of growth, Carole Nash had 30,000 policyholders on its books.

Carole Nash opened its first office in Ireland in 1999. In 2004, the company acquired the motorcycle insurance arm of The Automobile Association, helping it to increase its customer portfolio to 230,000 policyholders. In December 2006, the business was sold by its founder to French insurance group Groupama for a reported £80 million. Following the sale, David Newman was appointed as Chief Executive Officer in September 2007.

In May 2012 the company expanded into the classic motor industry with the launch of a specialist branch of the business tailored to meet the needs of classic and performance car owners. The company celebrated its 30th anniversary in 2015. To commemorate, a life-size replica of the first motorcycle ever insured by Carole Nash – an AJS 1927 – was unveiled, made entirely from cake and chocolate, and measuring two metres (length) by 0.9 metre (height). To this day, the owner is still insured through Carole Nash.

In 2017 Carole Nash was bought by Atlanta Group, (part of the Ardonagh Group).

== Key people ==
Carole Nash

Founder. Sold the business to Groupama in 2006. She is still actively involved with the company, taking part in events and interviews during the company’s 30th anniversary celebrations. In 2012 Carole Nash was appointed an OBE for charitable services in the Northwest of England.

David Newman

David Newman was CEO of Carole Nash Insurance Consultants Ltd and Chairman of Carole Nash Legal Services LLP, one of the first approved Alternative Business Structures (ABS) allowed under the Legal Services Act 2007,

He is a chartered director and chartered marketer as well as a fellow of the Chartered Institute of Marketing and the Institute of Directors. He also holds a diploma in Company Direction from the Institute of Directors.

He has been a non-executive director of the Insurance Fraud Bureau, a non-profit organisation funded by the insurance industry to detect and deter insurance fraud in the UK, since 2010.

Newman was named a finalist in the Northwest Director of the Year Awards 2015.

Ian Donaldson

Ian Donaldson is the current CEO of Carole Nash Insurance, Ian is also the CEO of Autonet and Swinton, both are subsidiaries of the Ardonagh group.

Customer Council

In 2014 Carole Nash created its own Customer Council. Made up of eleven policyholders, the council offers real-time insight into the current areas that matter most to real bikers, allowing Carole Nash to get beneath the surface of how they can provide better care and product offering. The Customer Council were involved in the development of 'Rider Cover' as standard on its policies, enabling bikers to ride their friend’s bikes for free.

== Partners ==
Jonathan Rea races professionally for Kawasaki in the World Superbike Championship, where he was crowned champion in 2015. To celebrate, colleagues from Carole Nash's Irish offices changed their name to Jonathan Rea by deed poll. Jonathan has been a brand ambassador for Carole Nash since 2013.

Leon Haslam currently competes in the British Superbike Championship for Kawasaki and is the son of retired MotoGP legend 'Rocket Ron' Haslam. Leon has been an ambassador for Carole Nash since 2014.

== Social responsibility ==
To commemorate the 30th anniversary of the company in 2015, Carole Nash donated £30,000, shared out amongst five local charities; the Christie Hospital, North West Air Ambulance, The Counselling & Family Centre, Forever Manchester and Brake.

A further £30,000 was split across six Blood Bikes groups. Blood Bikes are a rapid response motorcycle-based charity, run by unpaid volunteers, who move urgent medical supplies and test samples to hospitals up and down the UK.

== Insidebikes ==
The company operates its own motorcycle news, guide and advice site, entitled Insidebikes. The site provides motorcycle-related news covering industry news, consumer issues and sport news from the MotoGP, World Superbikes and British Superbikes championships. A number of guides on new products, models and owning and riding advice are also featured.

== Awards ==
Carole Nash has been awarded a number of awards, including:

- Personal Lines Broking Innovation of the Year award for 'Bikers Only' at the British Insurance Awards 2016
- Insurance Times Awards
  - Excellence in Motor Broking - 2015
  - Personal Lines Broker of the Year – 2015
  - Brand Marketing Campaign of the Year - 2012
- Defaqto
  - Carole Nash Motorcycle Insurance rated as an 'excellent product' and given five-star rating – 2012, 2013, 2014, 2015, 2016
- RiDE Magazine, RiDER Power Survey:
  - Britain's Most Used Motorcycle Insurance Broker – 2002, 2003, 2004, 2006, 2007, 2008, 2009, 2010.
- Insurance Age Awards:
  - Claims Initiative of the Year – 2004
- British Insurance Awards:
  - Personal Lines Broker of the Year – 2003, The Training Award – 2003
