= MedicoLegal Investigations =

Law firms of the United Kingdom

MedicoLegal Investigations Ltd (MLI) was a United Kingdom private limited company which worked with pharmaceutical companies to investigate alleged fraud and misconduct in medical research. Based in Cambridge, England, it was established in July 1996 by Frank Wells, former Director of Medical Affairs for the Association of the British Pharmaceutical Industry, and Peter Jay, retired detective chief inspector for Scotland Yard and former senior investigator for the General Medical Council Solicitors, and described itself as an "independent external whistleblower service". The company was dissolved in 2013.

MLI worked primarily with the pharmaceutical industry to detect fraud in industry-funded medical research. The company asserted that it had investigated over eighty research studies in conjunction with the Association of British Pharmaceutical Industries, leading to disciplinary proceedings against 27 doctors at the General Medical Council (GMC), all but one of whom were found guilty of serious professional misconduct. The Sunday Times, The Observer, and the Daily Express have published articles examining MLI's investigations of doctors and research studies.
