= Phoenix Railway Photographic Circle =

- Abbreviation: PRPC
- Established: 1971; 55 years ago
- Founder: Wyn Hobson
- Type: Photographic society
- Location: United Kingdom
- Fields: New Approach
- Publication: The Journal
- Website: phoenix-rpc.co.uk

Phoenix Railway Photographic Circle is a group of some of the UK's foremost railway photographers, founded in 1971 by Wyn Hobson, after interest in railway photography had largely foundered following the end of steam traction. Its aims were to reignite interest in contemporary railway photography and to further the boundaries of progressive and artistic approaches to the subject.

== The new approach ==
Many railway photographers of the 1960s, most notably Colin Gifford and also Ian Krause, Malcolm Dunnett and many others had adopted what came to known as the 'new approach', an attempt to portray railways as a part of the environment and to inject a much needed sense of realism into their work rather than the standard sun over the shoulder three-quarter views prevalent at the time. By 1970, as well as interest dramatically declining, the photographs that were used in the existing railway-photographic circulating portfolios of the time had begun to rely more and more on stock portraits of dubious quality, whose only virtue was that the subject-matter was steam-power; and any idea that photographers should turn their attention to the newer forms of rail traction tended to be viewed with little enthusiasm where it was not greeted with outright hostility.

== History ==
In the autumn of 1970, Wyn Hobson decided to found a circle where photographs of the modern traction done with creativity could be discussed and to further the use and acceptance of a more artistic approach to the subject. Accordingly, he wrote to sixty photographers whose work with modern traction had been appearing in the railway media over the last five or six years to see if they were amenable to the idea. The PRPC commenced operations in the spring of 1971 and towards the end of 1972 a sufficiently large nucleus of interested members existed for the creation of a small Colour Transparency Portfolio running in parallel with the main black-and-white folios. Since then, the circle has published several books and its work has appeared in a number of publications and many public exhibitions including a 2005 display at the National Railway Museum in York. The circle currently consists of 35 members, many of whom are among the UK's most well known railway photographers and is extremely active today, photographing the current railway scene in the UK and abroad. Members circulate portfolios of prints, slides and digital images amongst the membership and comment on each other's work in an attempt to improve each other's photographs.

== Publications ==
Many members of the PRPC have published books of their work and submitted articles on railway photography and other railway topics to the railway press.

=== Web ===
The work of the circle, complete with monthly galleries of the latest work can be seen at the circle's website.

=== Books ===
- Modern Rail Album. (D Bradford Barton 1974)
- Diesels And Electrics Around Britain (D Bradford Barton 1976)
- Trains Of Thought (George Allen and Unwin 1981)
