= DVV Media Group =

German publishing company

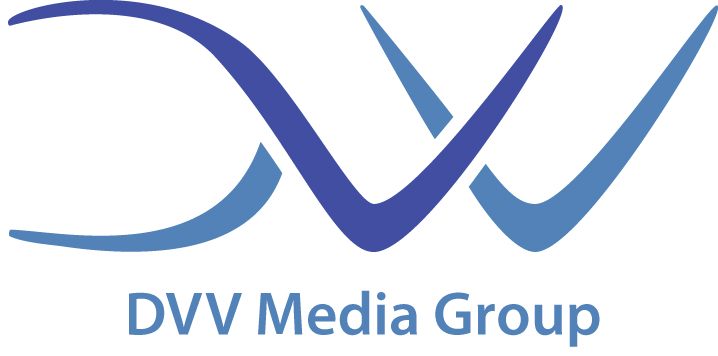
- Parent company: Rheinische Post
- Founded: 1947
- Founder: Julius Springer
- Country of origin: Germany
- Headquarters location: Hamburg
- Key people: Martin Weber
- Nonfiction topics: Transportation and Logistics
- No. of employees: 300
- Official website: www.dvvmedia.com

DVV Media Group is a global publishing company which publishes books and magazines about transport and logistic topics. In 2013, Rheinische Post Mediengruppe became the sole shareholder of DVV. In 2005, Verlagsgruppe Handelsblatt joined the DVV Group as a strategic investor, taking over some of the shares held by the heirs of the founders of the publishing house.

DVV Media International was a subsidiary of DVV Media Group based in Sutton, London, United Kingdom from 2017-2025. At the end of 2025, DVV Media International divested its entire portfolio and liquidated its assets. Its portfolio of publications and events related to road vehicle transportation was sold to Mark Allen Group. Its portfolio of publications and events related to other forms of transportation and human resource management were sold to ProMedia Group on 31 December 2025.

== Selected publications ==
- Air Cargo News
- Commercial Motor
- Flight International
- Metro Report International
- Rail Business UK
- Railway Gazette International
