= Trains Illustrated =

British magazine

- Publisher: Ian Allan Publishing
- First issue: January 1946
- Final issue: December 1961
- Country: United Kingdom
- Based in: London
- Language: British English
- ISSN: 0141-9935
- OCLC: 35845948

Trains Illustrated was a British rail transport magazine. The first edition of Trains Illustrated was published at the beginning of 1946. Due to post-war paper shortages, issues 1 to 8 appeared at varied intervals in 1946 and 1947. From issue 9 (April 1948) it was published quarterly, from issue 14 (August–September 1949) it became bi-monthly, and from issue 17 (February 1950) it became a monthly publication. The final issue under that title was volume XIV, no.159 (December 1961), after which the sequence continued under the Modern Railways title.

Early issues were edited by Ian Allan and O.J.Morris, with Cecil J Allen taking over from issue 5 and G. Freeman Allen from issue 20; he remained editor until December 1961, when the final issue of Trains Illustrated came out. The journey beyond that continued with Modern Railways, whose first edition was published in January 1962 as Volume XV, no. 160 in a sequence continuing from Trains Illustrated.

== Bibliography ==
- Joyce, Antony (1990). "Modern Railways - three decades". Modern Railways. Vol. 47. pp. 232–3.
