= Railway World =

- Editor: John Morris
- Categories: Rail transport
- Frequency: Monthly
- Publisher: Ian Allan Publishing
- Founder: GH Lake
- First issue: 1939
- Final issue: February 2003
- Country: England
- Based in: Lichfield
- Language: English
- Website: www.ianallan.com/publishing/railworld
- ISSN: 0033-9032

Railway World was an English-based monthly magazine covering rail transport in Great Britain. Founded by GH Lake in 1939 as Railways, in 1940 it was taken over by JW Fowler and renamed Railway World. It was sold to Ian Allan Publishing in 1959. The final edition was published in February 2003, it was superseded by Railways Illustrated the following month.
