= Railways Illustrated =

British monthly railway magazine

- Cover of the August 2024 issue
- Categories: Rail transport
- Frequency: Monthly
- Publisher: Mortons Media Group
- First issue: 2003
- Country: England
- Website: www.railwaysillustrated.com
- ISSN: 1479-2230

Railways Illustrated is a British monthly railway magazine. Aimed at railway enthusiasts, it includes news, detail of stock changes, tours, and more.

Founded in 2003 by Ian Allan Publishing, it was published by Key Publishing from 2012 until 2020 when purchased by Mortons Media Group.

== History ==
When the circulation of Railway World decreased to an unviable level, Ian Allan Publishing decided to replace the title entirely. The new monthly publication was initially to be called Railways, but given the heavy photographic content of the new title, as well as the similarity of the name to other magazines, the brand of Railways Illustrated was decided on. The masthead (logo) for the new title was designed by freelance designer Andrew Staniland. The new editor, Colin J. Marsden, appointed his own team, with just two members of the previous team, Brian Morrison and John Whitehouse, transferring to the new title. Because of the timescales, the new Railways Illustrated editorial team also produced the last two issues of Railway World.

After several years the editorship transferred from Colin J. Marsden to Pip Dunn, who replaced the entire editorial team. In early 2012 the rights to publish the magazine, along with all of the railway magazine titles of Ian Allan Publishing, were acquired by Key Publishing. In September 2020, Railways Illustrated was sold to Mortons Media Group.

== Inside ==
On the cover of the magazine, the main news stories are displayed. Inside, the news pages supply a detailed description with pictures where possible. Also, there is usually a main feature, such as Branchline Britain (March 2011 issue), or 'Inside Neville Hill Depot'. Also in the magazine, you'll usually find two pages of modelling, showing you what's currently in Hattons. This is a regular. Another regular is What's in the next issue at the end, and as the title suggests, it provides a brief insight into the next issue.

== Extras ==
Occasionally, Railways Illustrated will come with a supplement of some sort. These can include a modelling section, special rides, history (for example, the history of the Class 55 in February 2011's issue), and more.

== See also ==
- Rail transport in Great Britain
