= Ian Allan Publishing =

UK publisher of transport books

- Founded: 1942
- Founder: Ian Allan
- Defunct: 2020
- Country of origin: England
- Headquarters location: Shepperton
- Publication types: Books
- Nonfiction topics: Transport, freemasonry
- Revenue: £631,000 (2020)
- Official website: www.ianallanpublishing.com

Ian Allan Publishing was an English publisher, established in 1942, which specialised in transport books. It was founded by Ian Allan.

In 1942, Ian Allan, then working in the public relations department for the Southern Railway at Waterloo station, decided he could deal with many of the requests he received about rolling stock by collecting the information into a book. The result was his first book, ABC of Southern Locomotives. This proved to be a success, contributing to the emergence of trainspotting as a popular hobby in the UK, and leading to the formation of the company.

The company grew from a small producer of books for train enthusiasts and spotters to a large transport publisher. Each year it published books covering subjects such as military and civil aviation, naval and maritime topics, buses, trams, trolleybuses and steam railways, including history, preservation and modern operations. The headquarters was at the western end of Shepperton railway station in Surrey.

At the end of 2016, the company announced that it was withdrawing from railway publishing. Crécy Publishing acquired these titles, including the Oxford and ABC imprints. It continued to operate bookshops until the last was closed in October 2020.

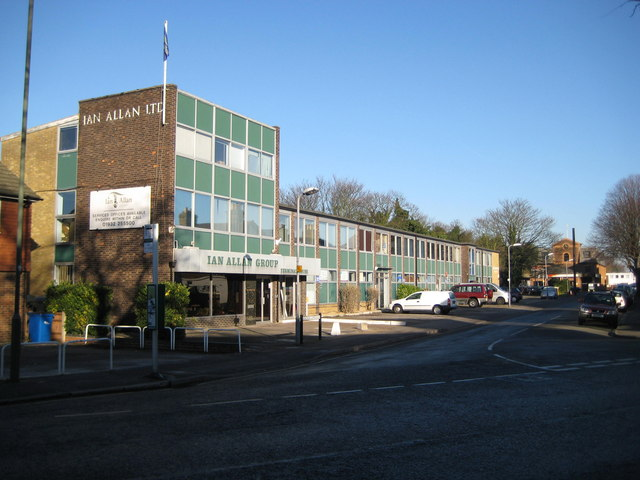
Ian Allan Publishing's Shepperton building in 2008

== Company acquisitions ==
Ian Allan Publishing acquired several companies and imprints.

- Locomotive Publishing Company in 1956
- Oxford Publishing Company, acquired in 1998 from Haynes Publishing
- Midland Publishing, acquired in 1999. The Midland imprint provides a range of specialist, highly illustrated titles, covering military aviation subjects from World War II to the present day. In civil aviation, comprehensive works of reference are published frequently.
- Classic Publications, a publisher of aviation titles, was added in 2002, bringing another imprint widely considered important in the World War II aviation market.

Ian Allan Publishing's trade representation is provided by Amalgamated Book Services for its own imprints and a growing list of associated publishers. Midland Counties Publications, acquired by Ian Allan Publishing at the same time as Midland Publishing, was established in the 1970s with the objective of selling books at aviation events and by mail order to a growing number of enthusiasts who could not always find the publications they wanted to read on the shelves of their local bookshop.

In addition to the above, Ian Allan also owns the imprint Lewis Masonic. Lewis Masonic produces the ritual books used by lodges and chapters under the United Grand Lodge of England. Ian Allan Publishing also published an extensive catalogue of general Masonic publications, but from the 1990s these were also transferred to the Lewis Masonic imprint, alongside the ritual books.

== Stores ==
The company formerly had stores at Cardiff (closed 2015), Manchester Piccadilly (closed 2016), Birmingham (closed 2019) and London at Lower Marsh (closed 2020).

== Magazines ==
Ian Allan Publishing was well known for its range of enthusiast-based magazines, including the following titles:

- Hornby Magazine, a monthly magazine aimed at enthusiasts of model railways. Despite the title, the magazine covers products of all manufacturers, not just Hornby
- Railways Illustrated, a monthly publication targeting enthusiasts
- Modern Railways, previously Trains Illustrated combined with Locomotive, Railway Carriage & Wagon Review
- Modern Locomotives Illustrated, previously Locomotives Illustrated (no longer published)
- Railway World, replaced by Railways Illustrated during 2003
- Buses, formerly Buses Illustrated
- Buses Focus, no longer published, was a spin-off from Buses
- Bus & Coach Preservation was first published in 2001 under the Ian Allan banner following a merger of two previous titles
- Vintage Roadscene. This now bi-monthly journal covers the world of historic transport
- Aircraft Illustrated was first published in 1968. It covered up-to-date news and features on civil aviation, airliners and preservation. In 2009 the magazine changed its focus to classic aircraft exclusively and was retitled Classic Aircraft
- Combat Aircraft provides in-depth coverage of the men and the machines at the forefront of the missions undertaken in today's combat zones
- Modern Transport (no longer published)
- Passenger Transport (no longer published)
- Railway Modeller (sold)
- Model Railway Constructor

A history of the company and of its publications down to 1967 appeared in the November 1967 edition of its magazine Railway World.

Those magazines still in print were acquired by Key Publishing in March 2012.

Through the Lewis Masonic imprint, the company also published the quarterly masonic magazine The Square, the longest-running masonic periodical in the United Kingdom.

From 1962 to 2007, Ian Allan also published, jointly with the Light Rail Transit Association (LRTA), the monthly magazine Modern Tramway, later as Light Rail and Modern Tramway and currently as Tramways & Urban Transit (TAUT), and continues to handle printing and some distribution of TAUT, as well as printing of the LRTA's quarterly historical journal, Tramway Review.

== Videos ==
The company was also responsible for producing a number of videos for sale in the shops on the themes of railway lines and military history, latterly under the name of Ian Allen SBS Video. A number of the titles such as Then and Now were picked up from the archive for broadcast on That's TV in 2024.
