= Modern Railways =

British railway magazine

- Editor: Richard Clinnick
- Categories: Rail transport
- Frequency: Monthly (fourth Thursday)
- Circulation: 16,000
- Publisher: Key Publishing
- Founder: Geoffrey Freeman Allen
- Founded: 1962
- Country: United Kingdom
- Based in: Tunbridge Wells, Kent
- Language: British English
- Website: https://www.modernrailways.com/
- ISSN: 0026-8356

Modern Railways is a monthly British magazine covering the rail transport industry. It was first published in 1962 by Ian Allan and by Key Publishing since March 2012. The magazine was based originally in Shepperton, Surrey, and subsequently in Tunbridge Wells, Kent.

The magazine has always been targeted at both railway professionals and serious amateurs; this aim derives from its origins as an amalgamation of the enthusiast magazine Trains Illustrated and the industry journal The Locomotive, in the hands of its first editor Geoffrey Freeman Allen.

As of July 2025, it is edited by Richard Clinnick. Regular contributors include Roger Ford, Ian Walmsley, Alan Williams and Tony Miles. Informed Sources is a large section written regularly by Ford and Pan Up is written by Walmsley.

== Trains Illustrated ==
The first edition was published at the beginning of 1946. Due to post-war paper shortages, issues 1 to 8 appeared at varied intervals in 1946 and 1947. From issue 9 (April 1948), it was published quarterly; from issue 14 (August–September 1949), it became bi-monthly; and from issue 17 (February 1950) it became a monthly publication. The final issue under that title was volume XIV, no.159 (December 1961), after which the sequence continued under the Modern Railways title.

Early issues were edited by Ian Allan and O.J. Morris, with Cecil J. Allen taking over from issue 5 and Geoffrey Freeman Allen from issue 20; he remained editor until December 1961.

== First edition ==
The first edition of Modern Railways was published in January 1962 as volume XV, no. 160 in a sequence continuing from Trains Illustrated. It featured a preface letter from Dr Richard Beeching, then Chairman of the British Transport Commission, who wrote:

"The thousands who read your journal every month derive from it a great deal of pleasure and useful information about the activities of British Railways. I feel that we share common ground, for your readers are our friends as well as yours, and we are helped by your success in holding and enlarging their interest. In particular we have come to expect from you, and to value, the kind of well-informed comment on our affairs which is the mark of a lively and competent magazine. Like the railways, Trains Illustrated is now moving towards a new era and I think it wholly appropriate that you should choose Modern Railways as your new title. What is merely a new name for you is an eagerly-sought objective for us. May we both go forward to new and rewarding success."

A feature article in the edition analysed peak traffic operations at Reading in the days leading up to Christmas 1960, stating:

"Reading…has neither a desperate shortage of platforms nor a crippling complication of layout…"

== Gallery ==
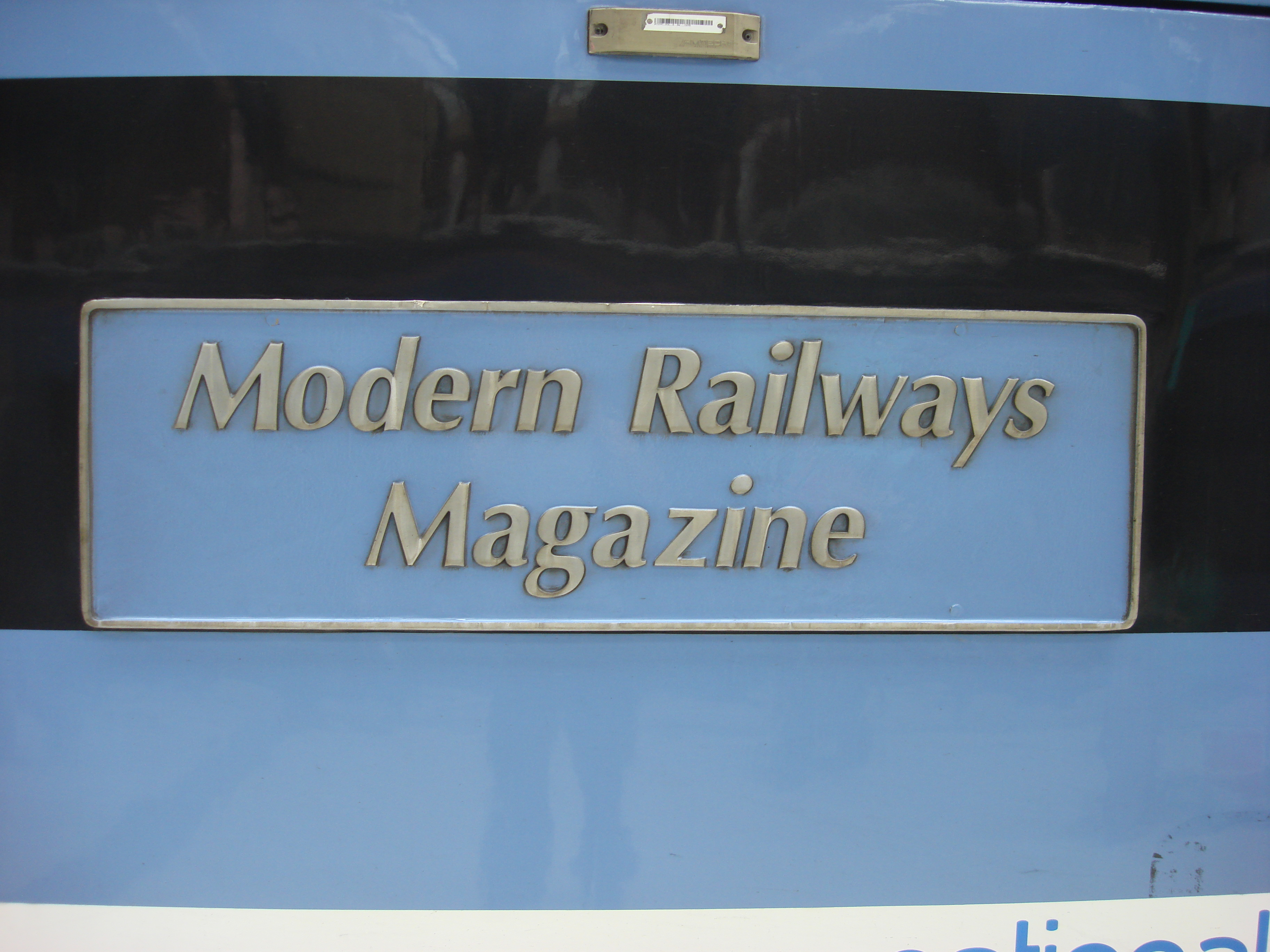
The Modern Railways nameplate of Class 90 no. 90006

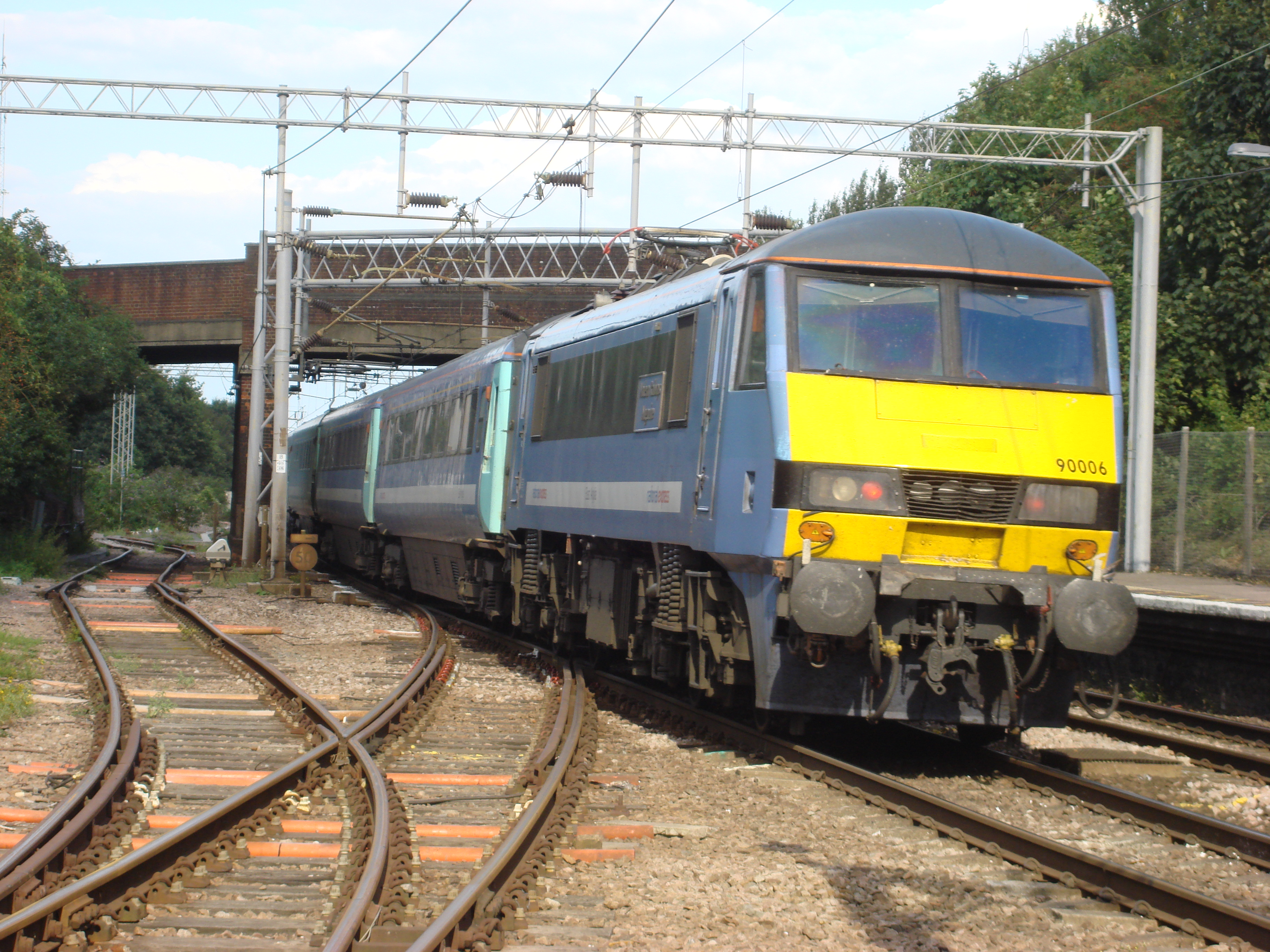
No. 90006 passing Marks Tey railway station

== See also ==
- List of rail transport-related periodicals
- Rail transport in Great Britain
- RAIL magazine
