= Railway Gazette International =

British monthly business magazine

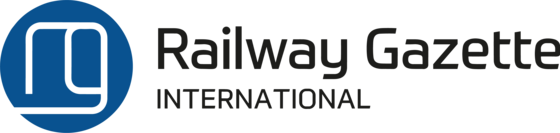

- July 2026 cover featuring the ČD Větroun
- Executive Editor: Nick Kingsley
- Senior Editor: Chris Jackson
- News Editor: Andrew Grantham
- Consultant Editor: Murray Hughes
- Categories: Rail transport
- Total circulation: 11,878 (2022)
- First issue: 1835 (1905 as Railway Gazette)
- Company: ProMedia Group UK
- Country: United Kingdom
- Based in: Sutton, London
- Language: English
- Website: www.railwaygazette.com
- ISSN: 0373-5346

Railway Gazette International is a monthly business magazine and news website covering the railway, metro, light rail and tram industries worldwide.

Available by annual subscription, the magazine is read in over 140 countries by transport professionals and decision makers, railway managers, engineers, consultants and suppliers to the rail industry. A mix of technical, commercial and geographical feature articles, plus the regular monthly news pages, cover developments in all aspects of the rail industry, including infrastructure, operations, rolling stock and signalling.

== History ==
Railway Gazette International traces its history to May 1835 as The Railway Magazine, when it was founded by Effingham Wilson. The Railway Gazette title dates from July 1905, created to cover railway commercial and financial affairs. In April 1914, it merged with The Railway Times, which incorporated Herapath's Railway Journal, and in February 1935 it absorbed the Railway Engineer. Around this time, it also absorbed The Railway News. It then reflected all aspects of railway activity, particularly in the British Empire and in other areas of the world which used similar technology.

In January 1964, it merged with the sister publication Diesel Railway Traction and its frequency reduced from weekly to fortnightly.

In October 1970, it was renamed Railway Gazette International and reduced in frequency to monthly.

Railway Gazette International was part of Reed Business Information until 1 April 2007 when it became part of DVV Media Group.

On 31 December 2025 Railway Gazette Group was acquired by ProMedia Group UK. ProMedia's Europe-focused brand RailTech was integrated into Railway Gazette International in April 2026.

== Railway Gazette Group ==
The Railway Gazette Group publishes the monthly magazine Railway Gazette International, covering news and features about railways around the world, as well as some urban transport news. Rail Business UK is an online publication covering the railway industry in the United Kingdom.

Metro Report International was published twice a year and focused on urban transport. Railway Gazette China covered mainline and urban railway news, and was published in Mandarin.
