= Inferno exotic car =

Mexican supercar

Inferno Exotic Car

Overview
- Type: Supercar
- Manufacturer: Inferno Automobili
- Designer: DoZeReK, Álvaro Gutierrez Ochoa and Antonio Ferrioli

Body and chassis
- Body style: Two-door coupe

Powertrain
- Engine: V8 twin-turbo
- Power output: 1,400 hp (1,044 kW)

Dimensions
- Curb weight: 1,200 kg (2,646 lb)

The Inferno Exotic Car is a super sports car designed by Dozerek and LTM Hot Spot and produced by Inferno Automobili in Mexico. It is one of a kind, made for a race in Mexico. The Inferno was manufactured by the Opac Group in Italy.

== Design/development ==
The design was made over seven years by the Dozerek house with the intervention of the Italian designer Antonio Ferrioli. It has a twin-turbo V8 engine capable of producing 1,400 horsepower (1,000 kW; 1,400 PS) and 670 pound-feet (910 N⋅m) of torque. It weighs 1,200 kilograms (2,600 lb) and has a drag coefficient of 1.4, these characteristics allow it to accelerate from 0 to 100 km/h (62 mph) in less than 3 seconds and reach a maximum speed of 400 km/h (249 mph).

The fenders and body of the car are made based on the metal foam known as Zinag, a patented zinc, aluminum and silver alloy, this foam has a density of 4.3 g/cm^{3} and is able to reduce and absorb the impact in an automobile accident. Although the design and engineering of the automobile were made in Mexico, it will be produced in Italy, due to the lack of infrastructure in the Latin American country.
