= Car spotting (disambiguation) =

Car spotting is the observing or photographing of interesting, vintage, rare, modified and supercars on public roads.

Car spotting or carspotting may also refer to:

- Car spotting (service), a railroad service
- Car spotting (positioning), the precise positioning of a car
- Car-spotting game, a roadtrip anti-boredom game
- Carspotting, a Discovery Channel program
