= Spotting =

Spotting may refer to:

Medicine

- Vaginal spotting, light bleeding that is not a menstrual period

Photography:

- Category:Observation hobbies
- Aircraft spotting
- Bus spotting
- Car spotting
- Train spotting

Pastimes:

- Spots (cannabis), a method of smoking cannabis

Physical activities:

- Spotting (climbing)
- Spotting (dance technique), a technique used by dancers to maintain control while executing turns
- Spotting (weight training)

Other:

- Artillery spotting or bombardment spotting, observing the result of artillery or shell fire and providing corrective targeting data to the firer
- Spotting (photography)
- Spotting (filmography), the process of determining the location of the musical score of a film
- Car spotting (disambiguation)
