= Model railroad layout =

Model of a railroad

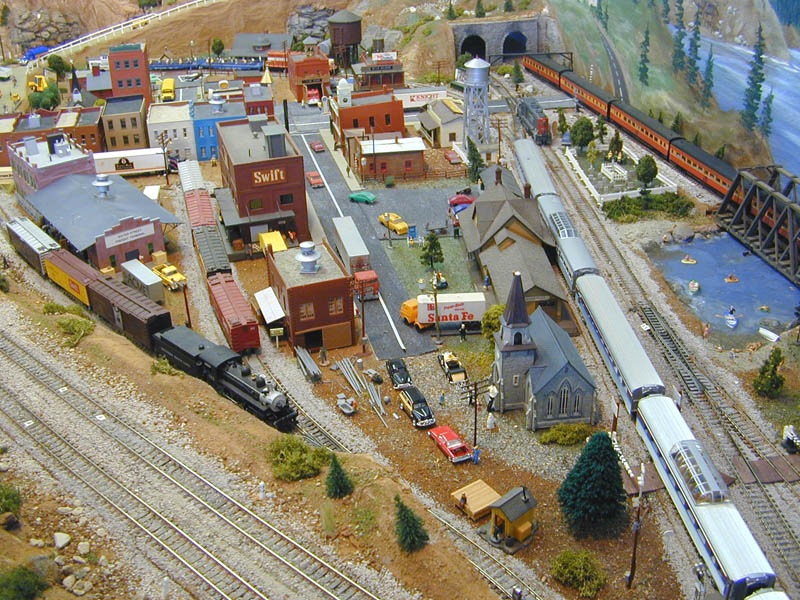
Part of an HO scale model railroad layout

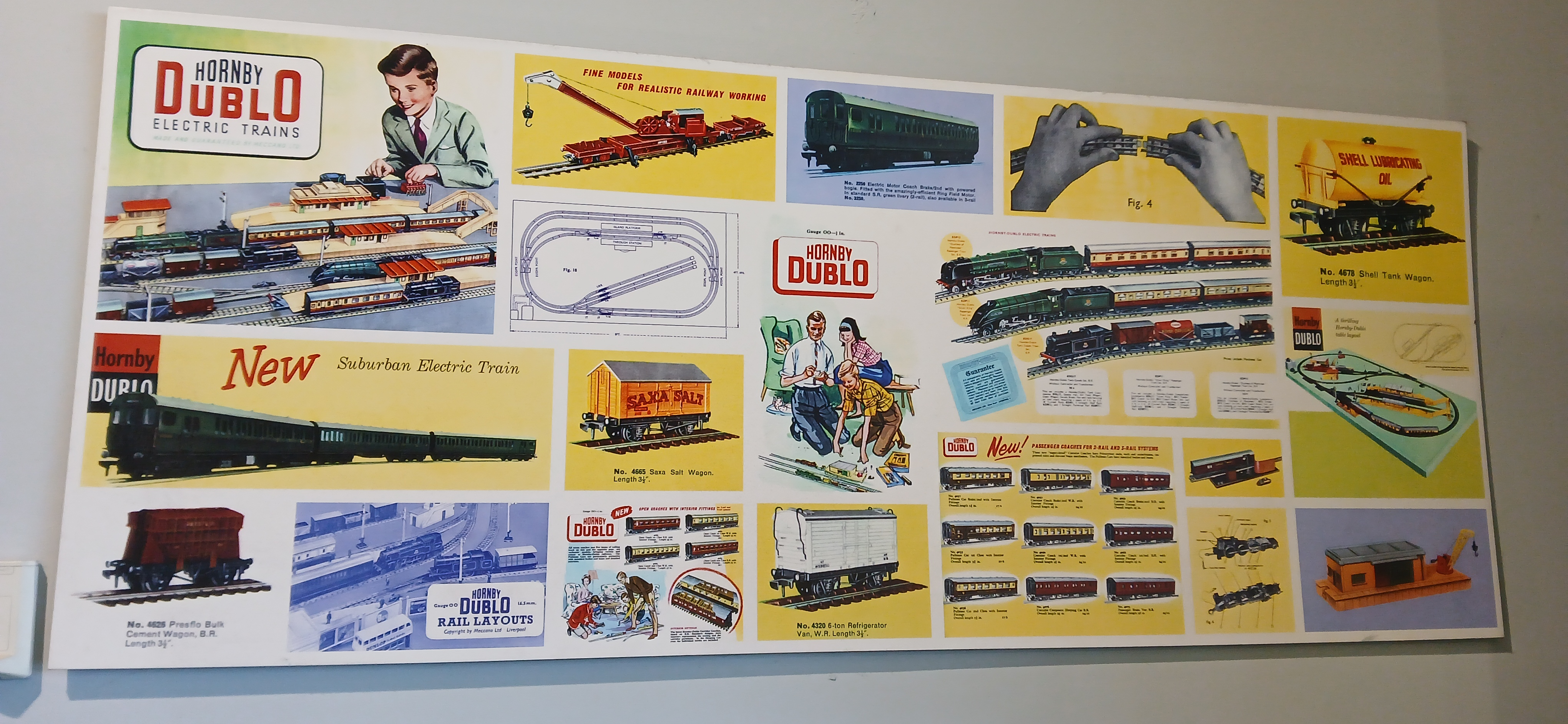
Hornby Dublo poster as seen at Locomotion, Shildon

In model railroading, a 'layout' is a diorama containing scale track for operating trains. The size of a layout varies, from small shelf-top designs to ones that fill entire rooms, basements, or whole buildings.

Attention to modeling details such as structures and scenery is common. Simple layouts are generally situated on a table, although other methods are used, including using a flush-sided door as a base. More permanent construction methods involve attaching benchwork framing to the walls of the room or building in which the layout is situated.

== Track layout ==
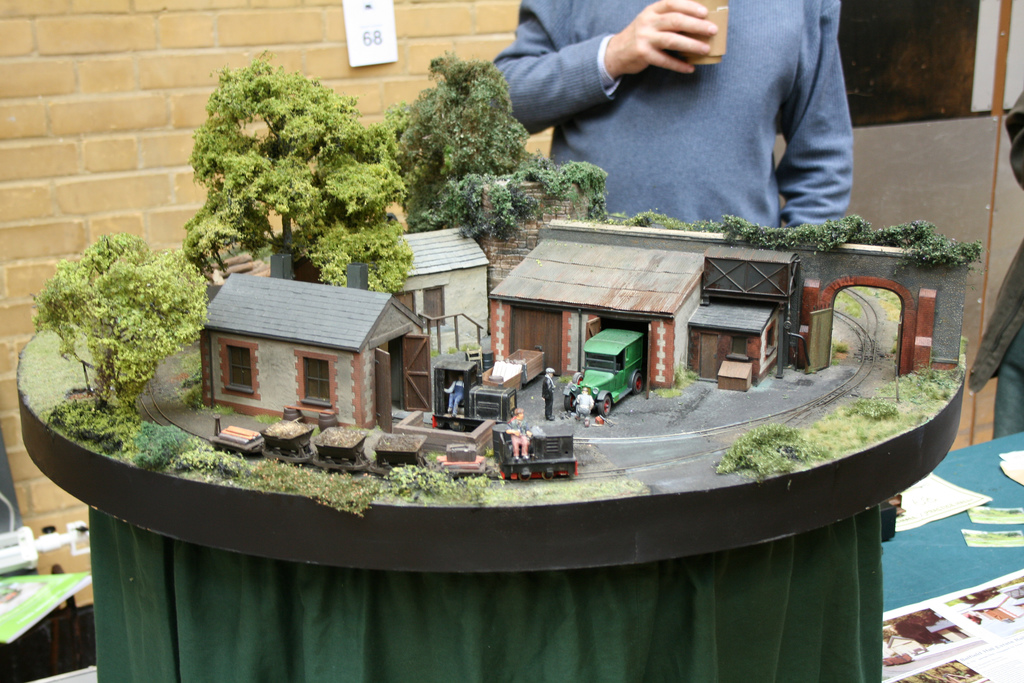
Micro 'pizza layout' with 9 mm gauge track in 7 mm scale (09 scale)

An important aspect of any model railway is the layout of the track itself. Apart from the stations, there are four basic ways of arranging the track, and innumerable variations:

- Continuous loop ('Tail Chaser') • A circle or oval, with trains going round and round. Used in train sets.
- Point to point/End to End A line with a station at each end, with trains going from one station to the other.
- Out and back. A pear shaped track, with trains leaving a station, going round a reversing loop, and coming back to the same station.
- Shunting (US: Switching). Either a station, a motive power depot or a yard where the primary mode of operation is shunting. This includes layouts which are built as a train shunting puzzle such as Timesaver and Inglenook Sidings.

Common variations:

- On a point to point layout, the train can increase the time it takes to get from A to B by going around a continuous loop a few times.
- Single or double track or more, so more trains can run at the same time.
- Intermediate stations, to distinguish between express trains which go straight through and local trains which stop briefly.
- Branch lines, to add an excuse for more stations and different types of trains.
- Use of multiple levels.
- Arranging the continuous loop as a figure-of-8, possibly with one track going over the other instead of having tracks crossing on the same level.
- Folding one loop of a figure-of-8 over the other loop to produce a looped-8, so as to reduce the amount of space needed while keeping a long continuous run.
- Using one or more fiddle yards (US: staging tracks) to represent the rest of the railway system. A fiddle yard is regarded as off-scene; it may hold multiple complete trains, and may also be subject to direct human intervention (fiddling) to re-arrange trains,
- Dog-bone arrangement of a continuous loop; the sides of an oval are squeezed together so it looks like a double-track section with a loop at each end where the trains turn around.
- Rabbit warren; a continuous loop folded over itself several times with multiple levels and many tunnels for trains to pop in and out of - often a small layout with sharp curves and short trains.

== Different scales ==
A comparison of different scales and their dimensions

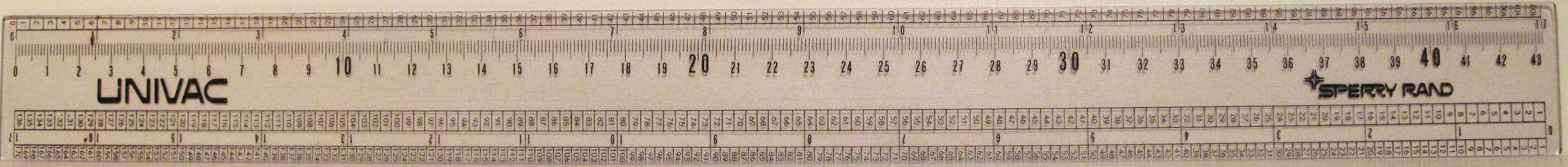
A complicated scale rule used for scale measurements when A list of different gauges and their scales: Rail transport modelling scales#NMRA In the UK, OO gauge is one of the most popular sizes as 1:76 is not 'too fiddly' nor too large to fit in one's room. Despite this, TT gauge (1:120 scale) is becoming increasingly popular because its tiny size enables anybody to have a larger layout in a smaller area. Still, the closer to life-size, the more detail can be added without using tweezers. drawing plans or modeling.

Some modelers use a scale ruler to ensure that something such as a brick wall is the correct height. For example, OO gauge uses the ratio 4 millimeters to one foot. So a 6 foot wall in reality would be 24 millimeters tall on the railway layout.

=== O Gauge ===
The first Gauge was known as O Gauge and was 1:43.5 in scale. Which is a quarter inch to the foot. The distance between the rails was 32 mm (1.26 inches). This size of train was good because of the level of detail one could add the diorama. But due to the space layouts took up and the expense of buying bigger trains, train manufacturers resolved to create a new scale known as Half O gauge or HO gauge.

=== HO Gauge ===
HO (standing for Half O) was a much more popular gauge because of its size and affordability. The gauge was 16.5mm between the rails. The scale was Half of O which was 1:87 but this at the time created another problem. The motors and wires inside the train itself were too big and were being crammed in the small spaces inside the trains which was difficult to do. Therefore Double O gauge was created (OO).

=== Double O Gauge (OO) ===
Double O (OO) used the same gauge as HO at 16.5mm between the rails but used a scale mismatch (1:76.2) which meant that the standard track didn't look quite right with the trains i.e. the sleepers are too close together to be prototypical. There are other options of course such as the Peco bullhead track which has prototypical sleeper spacing but obviously the gauge is still flawed in comparison to the scale.

== Powering model railroads ==
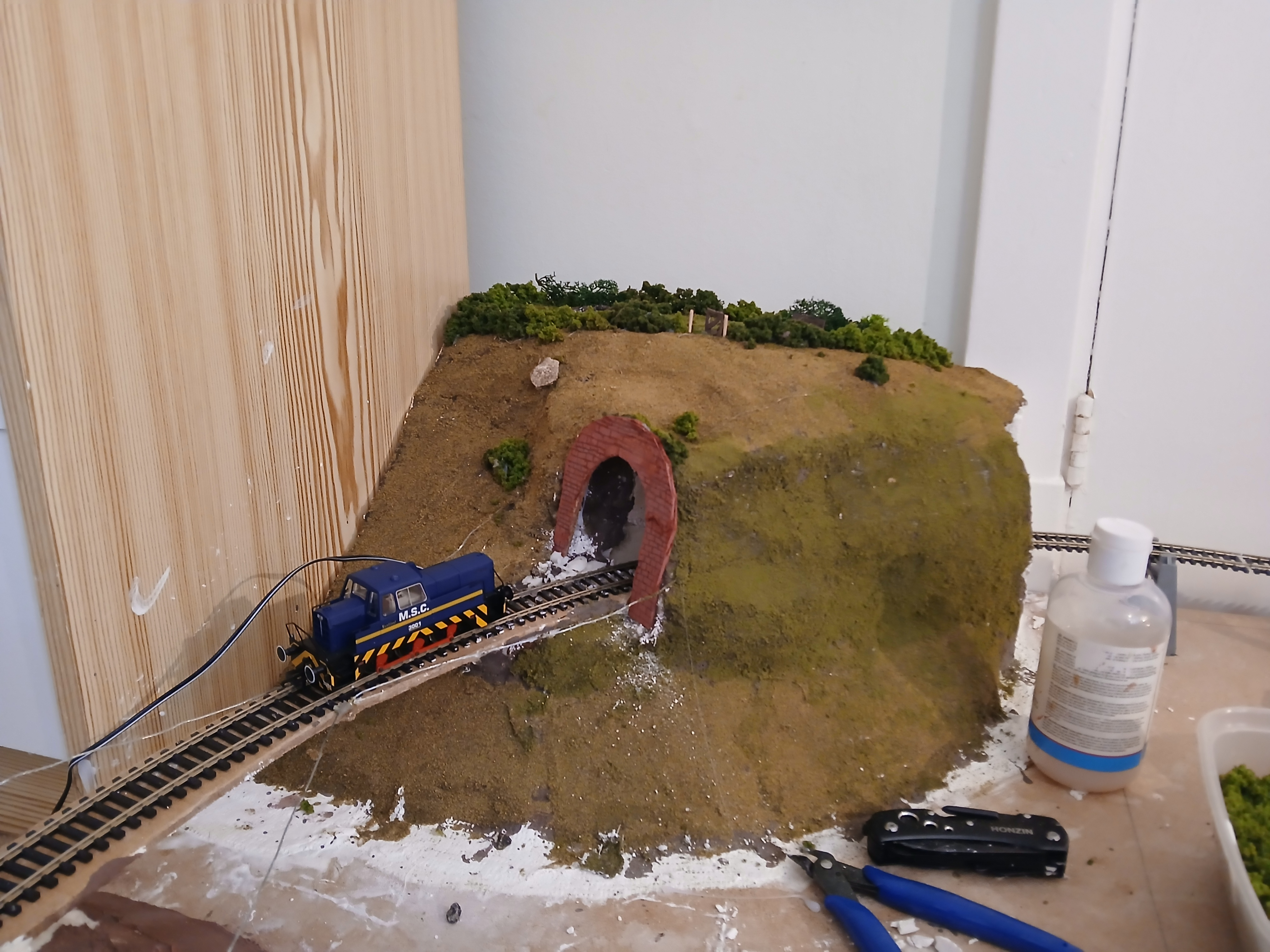
Train sitting on powered track (OO gauge)

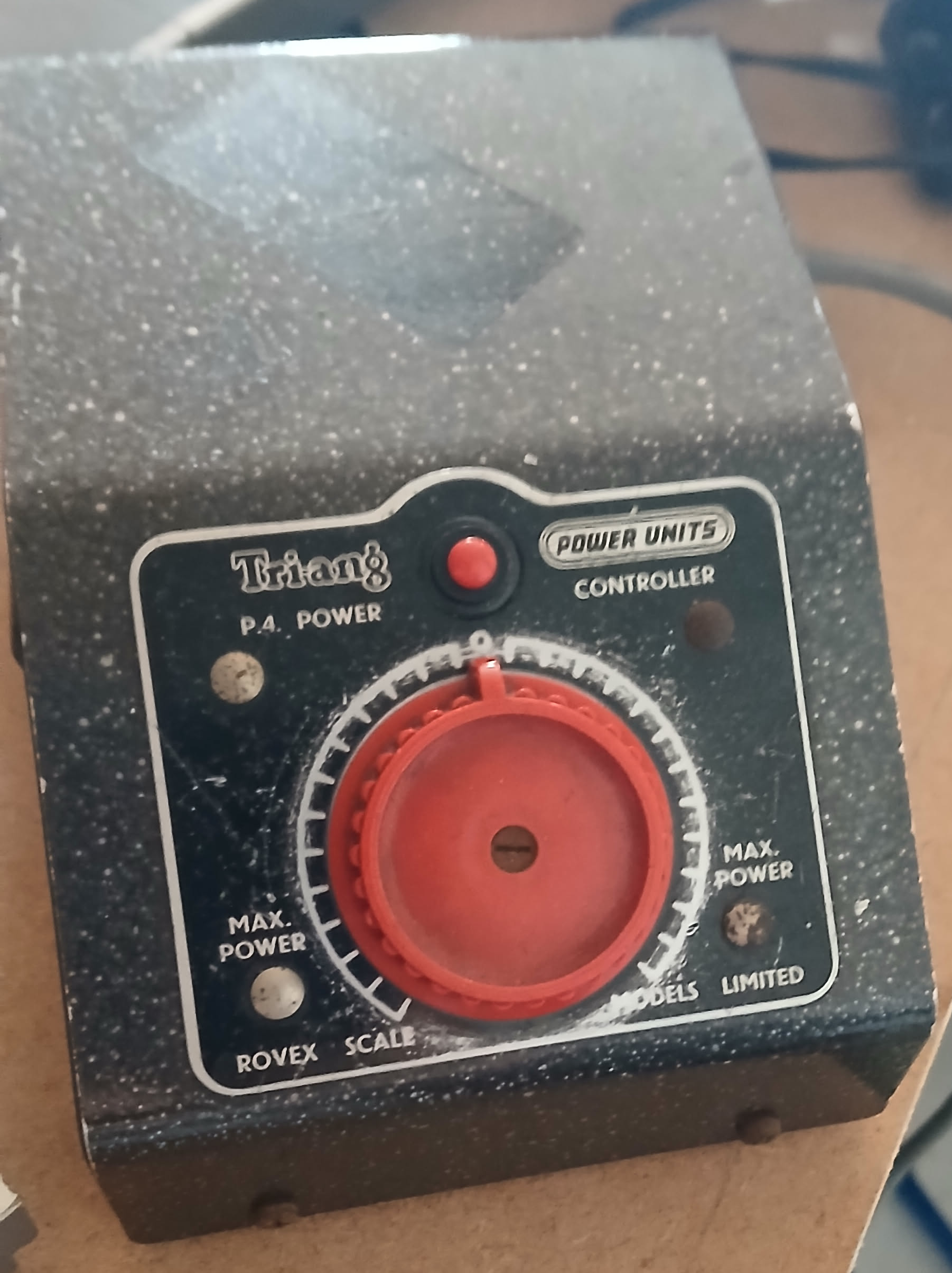
A DC power unit made by Tri-ang in the 1950s

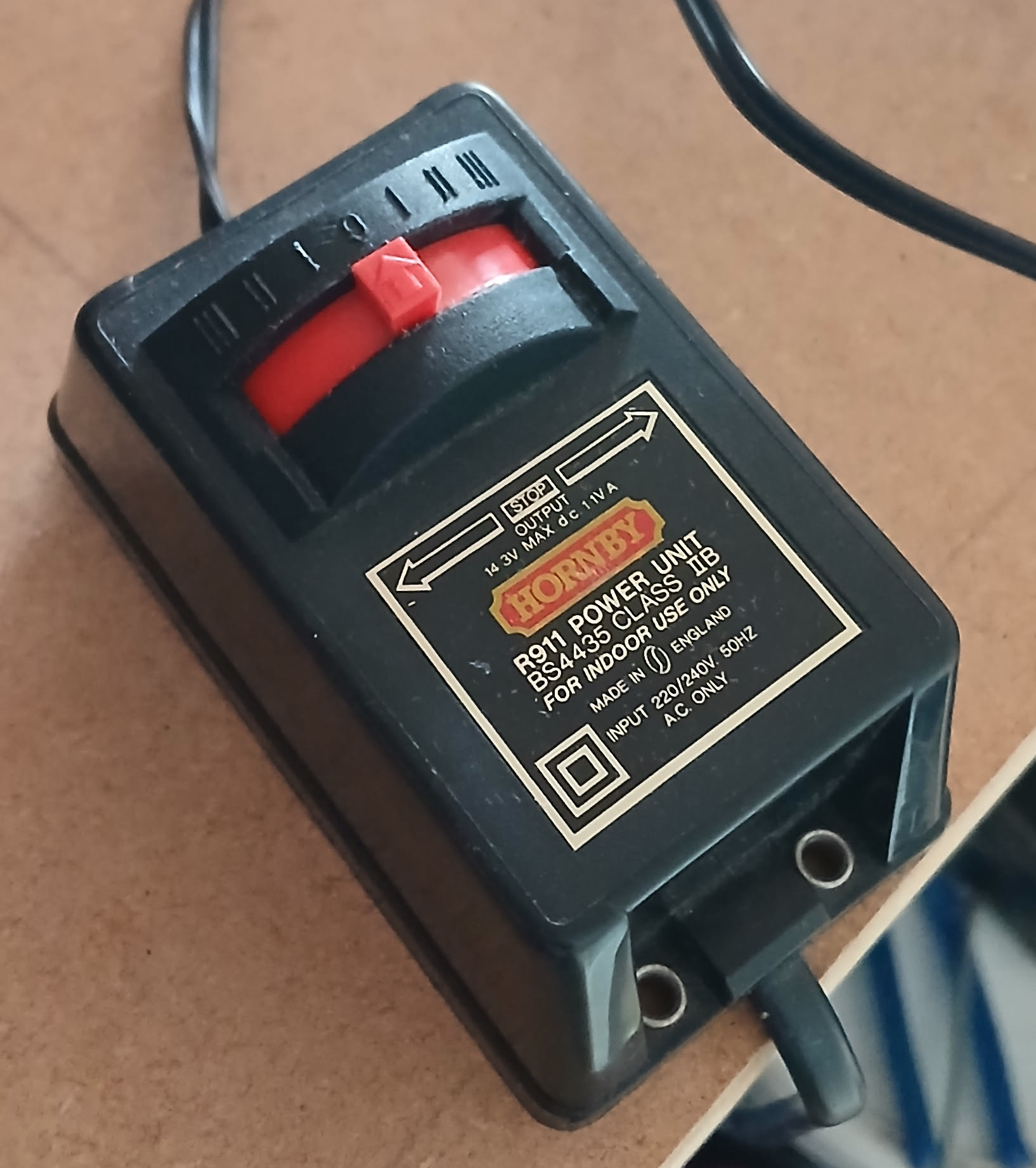
A DC power unit made by Hornby in the 1980s

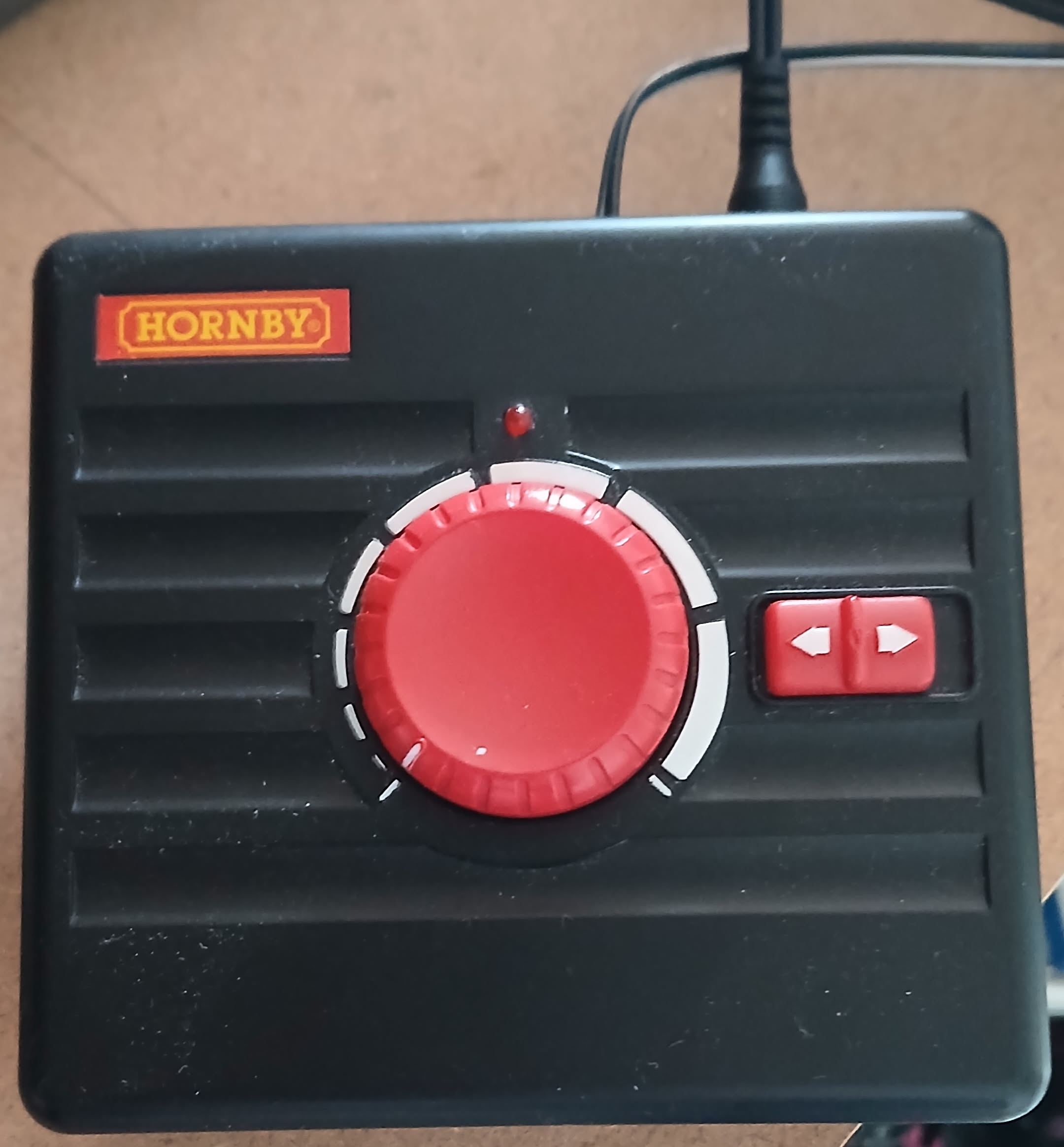
A DC power unit made by Hornby in the 2020s

=== DC (Direct Current) ===
A model railway operates with the use of powered track (electricity) where a handheld transformer is used to alter the power of the track. A standard model train made by companies such as Hornby or Accurascale includes a motor driven by pickups that touch the metal wheels of the train thus carrying a current through the motor.

=== DCC (Digital Command Control) ===
Similar to DC, DCC still runs power through the track but instead of using just a simple current, DCC uses binary signals to 'call' for each train. On a DCC layout, each train has an address enabling you to choose which trains to power, when, what direction, which headlights to use and how fast. Instead of controlling the track, you now control the trains themselves. Each DCC train has a decoder which understands the signals sent by the handset and thus powers the train when called for.

Another feature of a DCC layout is that you can control other assets of your railway such as points, signals (if not already automated), sounds, and other electronic devices that you may want to add for an even more realistic experience.

DCC diagram of a layout

== Station layout ==
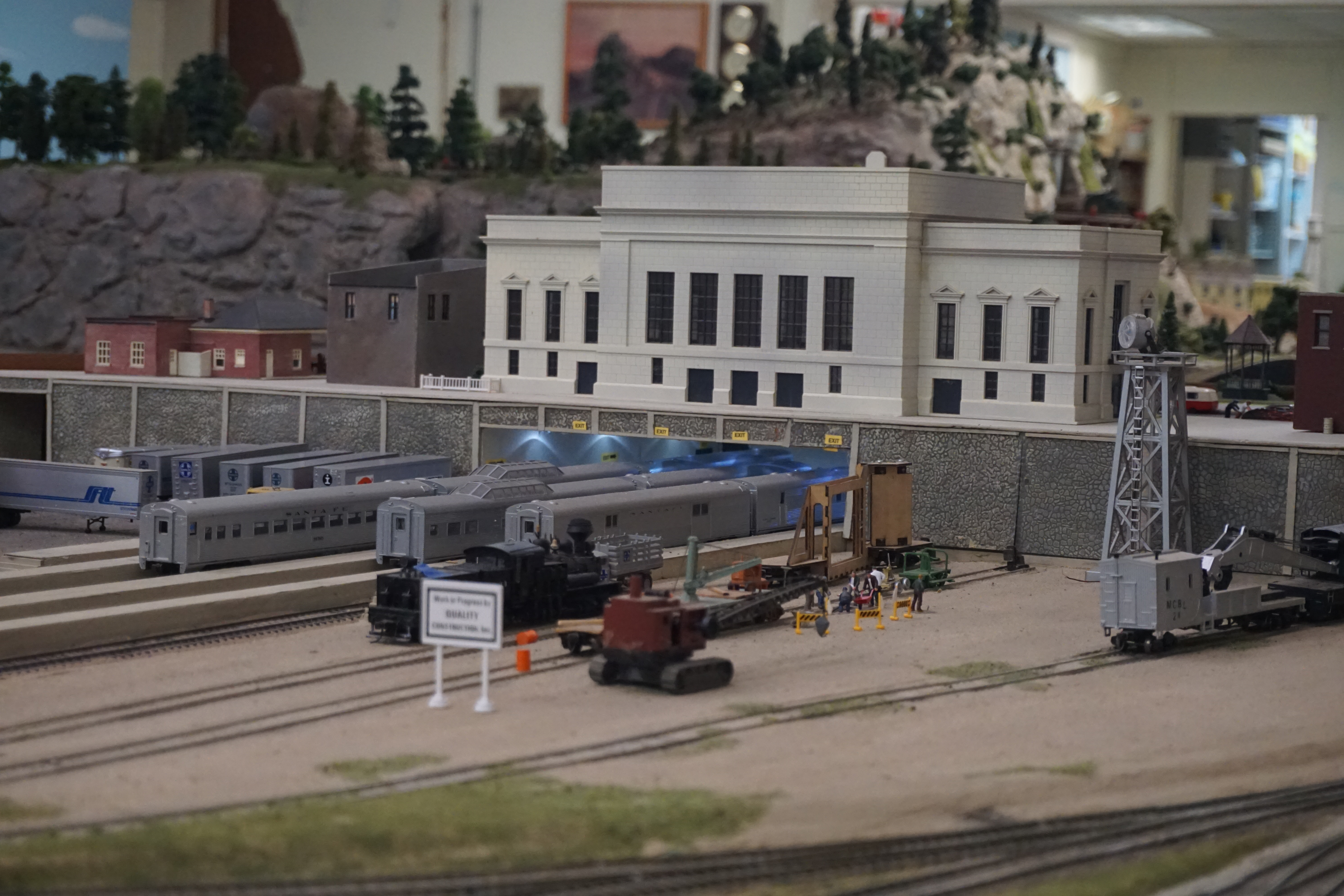
Terminal station modeled on the East Texas Model Railroad Club HO-scale layout

There are three basic types of station, and sometimes combinations of these types:

- Terminus or terminal station. As the name implies, all trains stop here, and then go back to where they came from.
- Through station. Trains can go through this station; express trains don't stop, while local trains do stop briefly before continuing their journey.
- Junction. The tracks diverge/join here.

Other factors which affect the track layout of a station include:

- For passengers only, or for goods only, or for both passengers and goods.
- Use of steam engines and/or diesel/electric engines.
- Use of trains which can be driven from either end, e.g. Diesel Multiple Units.

The simplest possible station for passengers consists of just a platform beside the track, with no points (US: switches) or sidings. Both terminal and through stations can be as simple as this; a junction requires at least one point.

== Large manufactures ==
For a more general category of all companies relating to model railway or just simply 'models' visit this page.

A list of popular locomotive and rolling stock manufacturers
Locomotive Manufacturer	Manufacturer	First train released	Present?	Website
Locomotive Manufacturer	Hornby	1920	Yes	
Locomotive Manufacturer	Tri-ang	1950	No. Merged with Hornby in 1964	
Locomotive Manufacturer	Bachman	1968	Yes	
Locomotive Manufacturer	Accurascale	2015	Yes. Bought Heljan in March 2026	
Locomotive Manufacturer	Dapol	1983	Yes	

Some other popular manufacturers include Rapido, Oxford rail, Arnold and Kato but these are slightly less known.

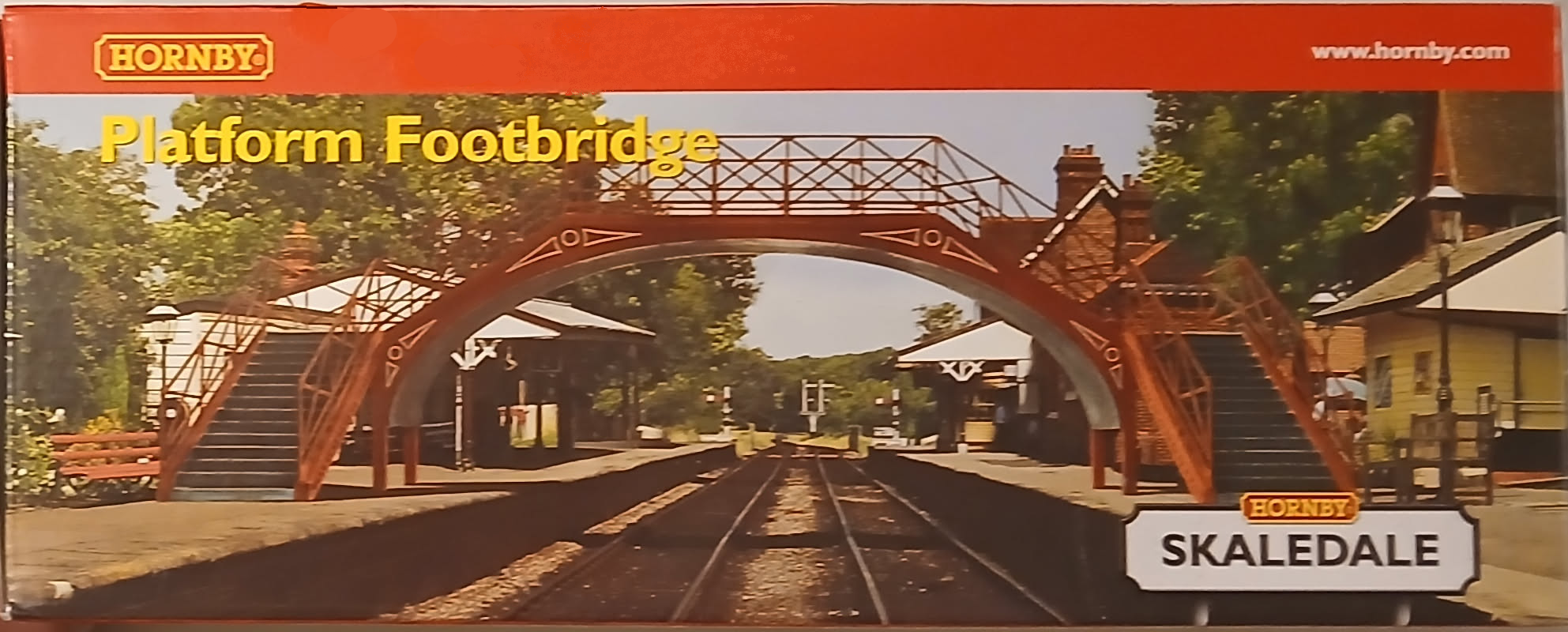
Hornby platform footbridge

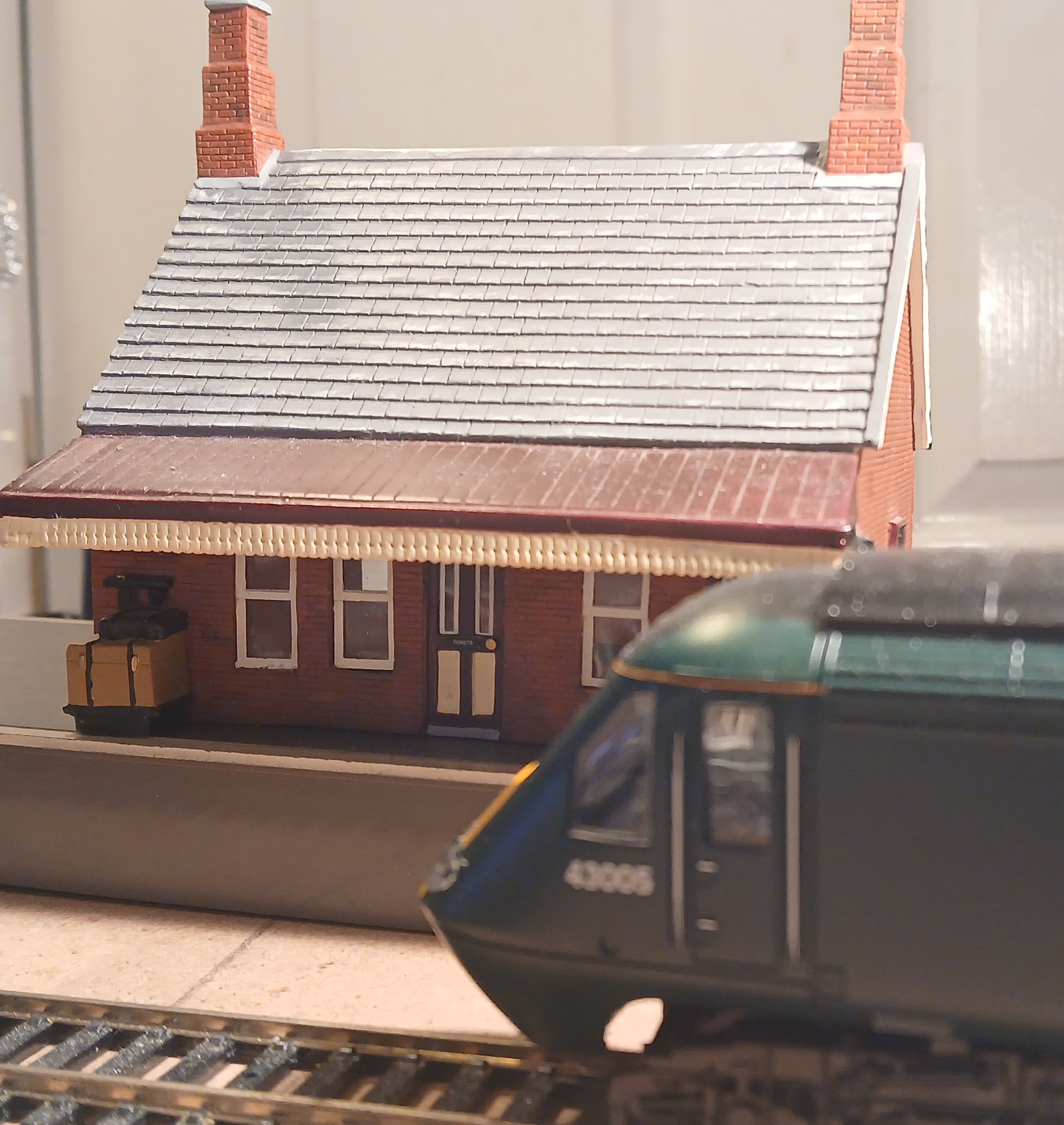
Hornby station waiting room

There are also some other big names in the model railway hobby but not for manufacturing trains. Although Hornby, Bachman and Dapol are also large scenic, building and accessory manufacturers, the below companies have been some of the most popular layout accessory companies in the world for over 20 years. The bold products indicate the company's most dominantly sold category.

A list of popular track and accessory manufacturers
Accessory Manufacturer	Manufacturer	Date founded	Main product category	Website
Accessory Manufacturer	PECO	1946	Track, scale scenery, electrics, and rolling stock	https://peco-uk.com/
Accessory Manufacturer	Woodland scenics	1975	Scale landscaping materials, 1:87 scale (HO gauge) cars and model figures	https://woodlandscenics.com
Accessory Manufacturer	Digitrax	1993	Digital Command Control and digital accessories	https://www.digitrax.com/
Accessory Manufacturer	Oxford diecast	1993	Diecast vehicles and trains	https://www.oxforddiecast.co.uk/
Accessory Manufacturer	Kadee	1946	Magnetic train couplings that function like real ones and some rolling stock	https://kadee.com/
