= Shmee150 =

British car vlogger and YouTuber (born 1987)

Timothy John Burton
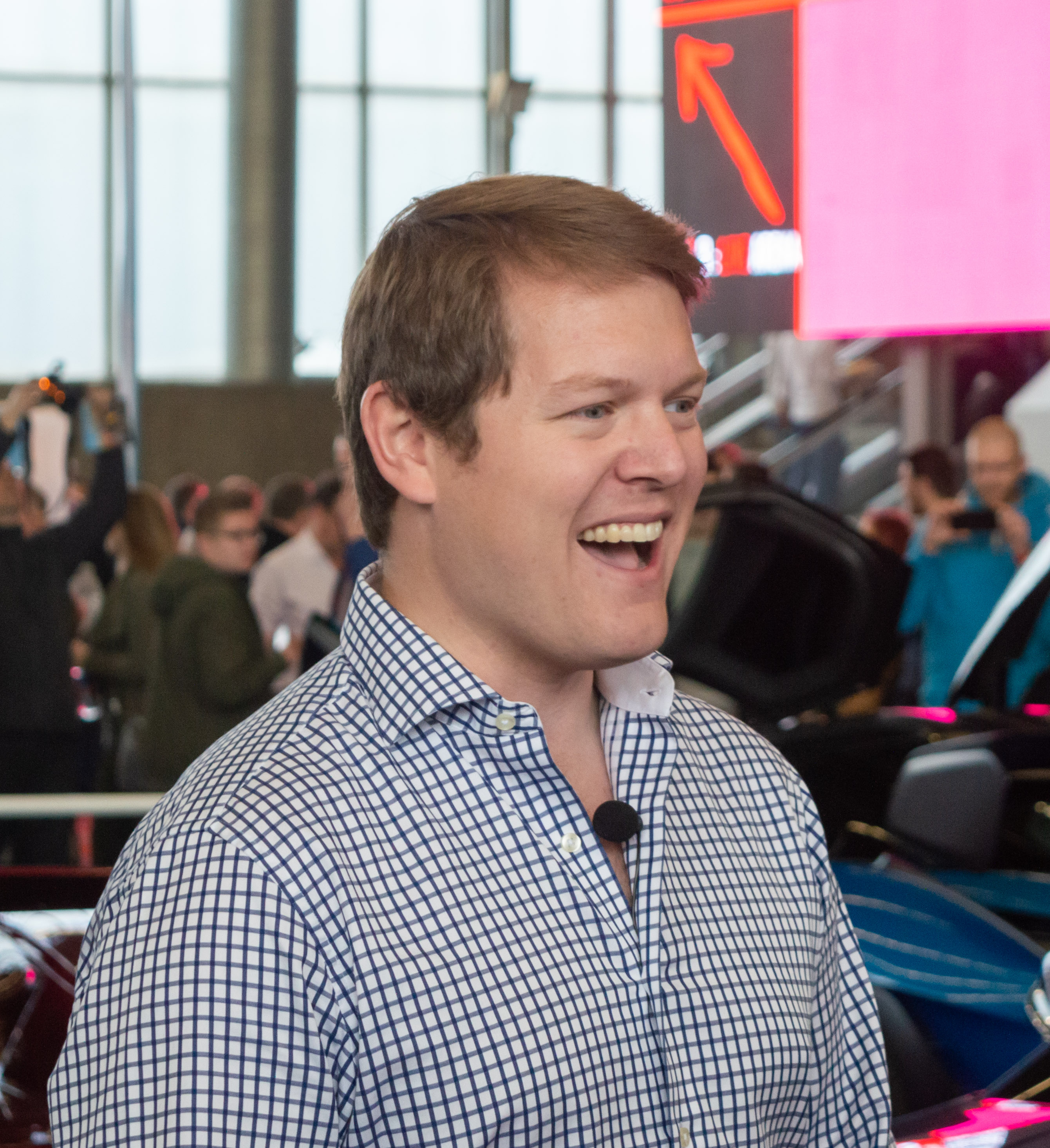
- Tim Burton at the 2019 International Amsterdam Motor Show (IAMS)
- Born: 17 September 1987 (age 38)
- Occupation: YouTuber
- Years active: 2010–present

YouTube information
- Channel: Shmee150
- Genre: Automobiles
- Subscribers: 2.86 million
- Views: 1.28 billion
- Last updated: 11 May 2026
- Website: www.shmee150.com

Timothy John Burton, known professionally as Shmee150 or Shmee, is a British car vlogger and YouTuber who is based in London. His YouTube channel has over 2.8 million subscribers and features videos of him traveling to see exotic cars and maintaining and using his own car collection.

== Biography ==
Burton was born on 17 September 1987. Educated at Rugby School, he passed his A-Levels in 2006. Before becoming a car vlogger, he owned an electronics web store, which he sold to become a ski instructor in New Zealand. When he returned to the UK after a fall, he initially started to study, but stopped a few weeks later. Subsequently, he got a job as part of the technology team at an investment consultancy firm in the City of London. He started posting pictures of special cars he spotted on his Facebook page and on online forums beginning in 2008 as a hobby. Burton uploaded his first video on YouTube on his Shmee150 channel in January 2010. It featured two supercars at a Top Gear event. He did not appear in the camera frame in his first videos, instead capturing special cars.

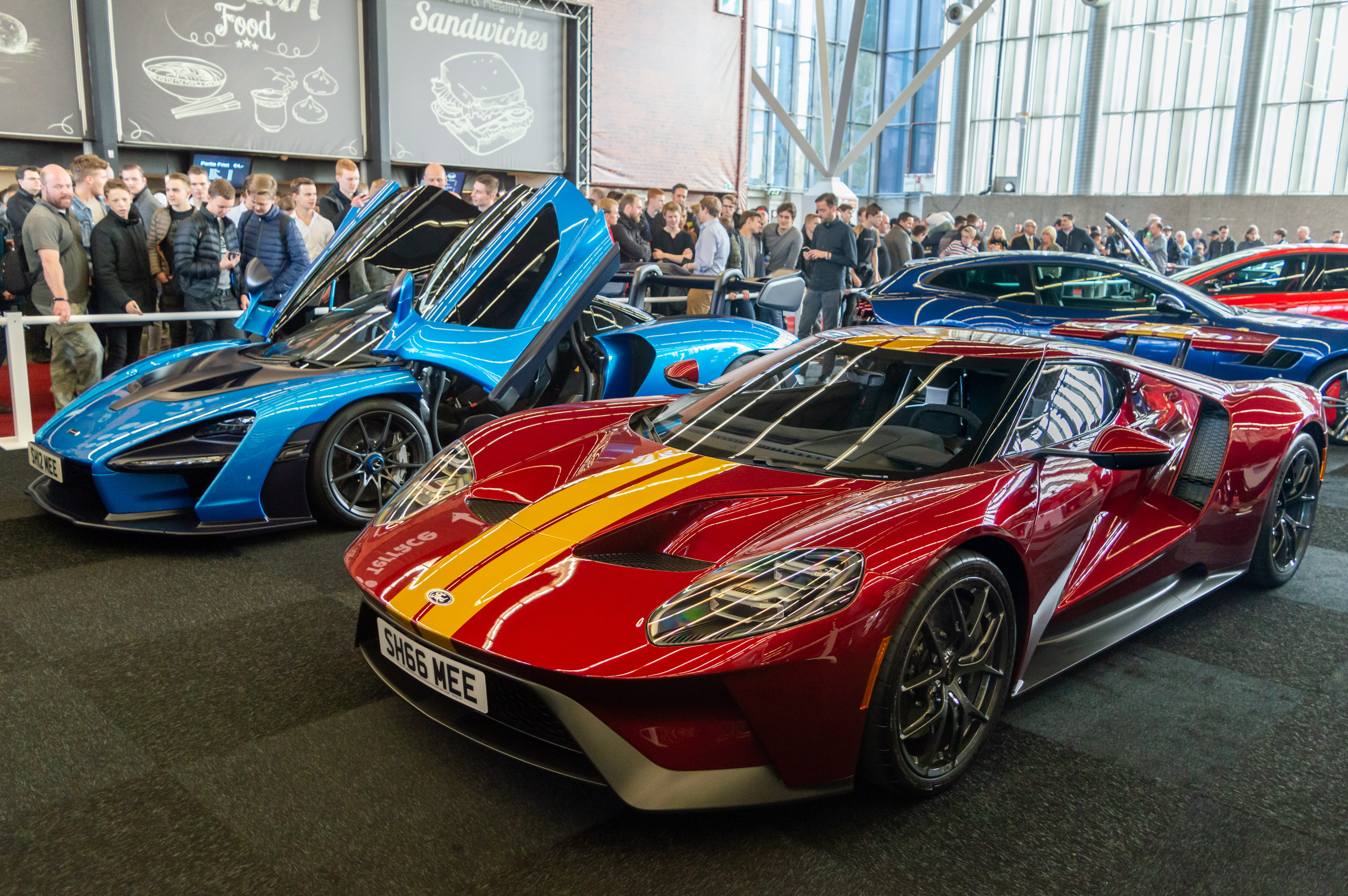
Burton's Ford GT (red) and McLaren Senna (blue) with personalised plates, containing Burton's pseudonym, at the 2019 IAMS.

His online following started out small, but began to grow over the next years, causing him to leave his other job a few years after his first video. In 2016, a book written by Burton called Living the Supercar Dream was published by Blink Publishing about his trips and experiences. He also started to accumulate a car collection. As of 2020 he owned about 15 cars.

Burton has over two million subscribers on his YouTube channel, with an audience that is around 95% male and largely between 25 and 45. Part of his income is earned through advertisements during his videos and on his social media, but Burton also generates revenue through merchandise, sponsorships, and consultancy for car brands. He uploads several videos per week and vlogs about using and maintaining his car collection and about his road trips and travels. During his trips Burton visits press launches, special and rare cars, and other car collections.
