= Progressor (disambiguation) =

A progressor, in science fiction, is a person who carries out claldestine acceleration of progress in less advanced civilizations.

Progressor may also refer to:

- Car progressor or car spotter, a system that positions train cars one after another
- Progressor, in medicine a patient whose disease is progressing; see, e.g., "Immune-related response criteria"
- S. progressor, species of Siphonophora
- "Progressor" ("Puroguressā"), anime adaptation of a light novel from series Clockwork Planet
