= Supercar Season =

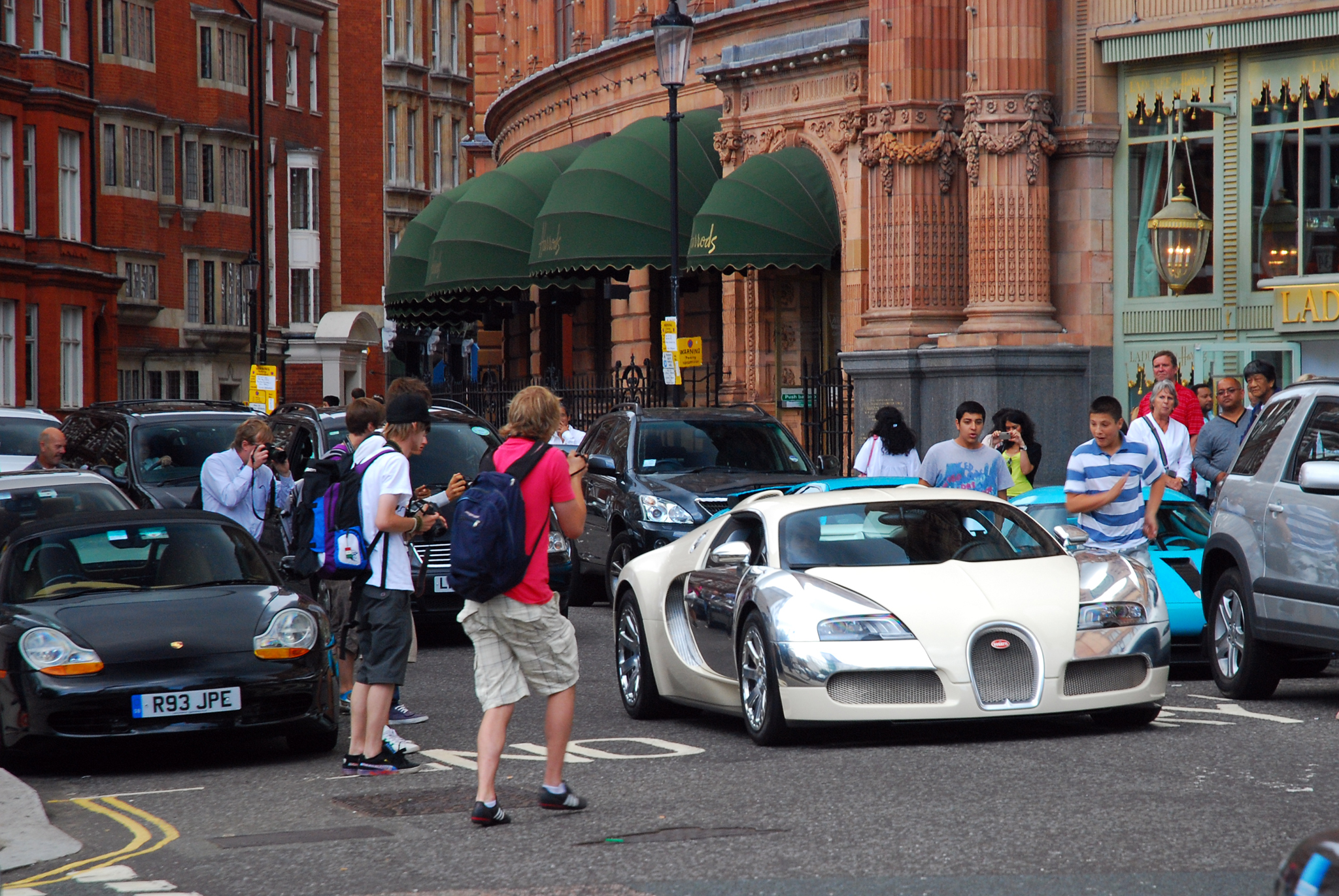
Car spotters photographing a Bugatti Veyron outside Harrods in Knightsbridge

The term "Supercar Season" began in London and became synonymous with wealthy Middle Eastern visitors showcasing their supercars in affluent London neighbourhoods, namely Knightsbridge and Kensington, while car enthusiasts collect footage to upload to social media applications, such as YouTube.

== Overview ==
Many of the supercar owners visit London during the summer months of June, July and August to escape the heat in Arab states of the Persian Gulf and they transport their supercars with them, which is why so many Middle Eastern registration plates can be seen on the streets of London during summer months. The Supercar Season now attracts UK registered supercar owners to cruise, as is evident in video captured by car spotters uploading their clips to YouTube.

In 2011 the media coined the Supercar Season phenomenon 'Ramadan Rush', as the Ramadan calendar fell on 1 August of that year and the retail sector embraced this reference, whereas the car enthusiasts refer to it as 'Supercar Season'. Supercar owners and car spotters both suggest more consideration should be shown for the phenomenon, saying that it brings wealth to the UK.

== Local residents ==
Supercar Season attracts many car spotters, but the increased interest and growing number of supercars on London streets has caused concern for many local residents complaining about engine noise levels.

In July 2015, Kensington and Chelsea Borough Council launched a consultation to introduce new measures to tackle what it calls "the problem of supercars" in and around the Knightsbridge area as residents were complaining about excessive noise levels and anti-social behaviour. As part of its consultation, the council says it will be looking to address "the issue of high-performance cars speeding in the streets, drivers revving engines and vehicles causing obstructions." Some car spotters suggest the real noise levels are actually being caused by UK residents in cheaper modified vehicles. Posters have been placed by RBKC.
