= Andy Sperandeo =

- Born: September 1, 1945; New Orleans, Louisiana
- Died: October 2, 2015; Brookfield, Wisconsin
- Occupation: magazine editor
- Years active: 1979-2011
- Known for: Model Railroader magazine
- Notable work: Great Model Railroads, Easy Model Railroad Wiring, The Model Railroader's Guide to Passenger Equipment & Operations and The Model Railroader's Guide to Freight Yards

Andy Sperandeo (September 1, 1945 – October 2, 2015) was an editorial employee of Kalmbach Publishing's Model Railroader Magazine beginning in 1979. He was executive editor after being the magazine's editor previously. He wrote several books on model railroading, including Easy Model Railroad Wiring, The Model Railroader's Guide to Freight Yards and others. Sperandeo's video credits include hosting Model Railroads In Action: 5 Layouts From Great Model Railroads Magazine and appearing on two episodes of Tracks Ahead; one featured the Model Railroader club layout, the Milwaukee, Racine, and Troy Railroad (MR&T) and the other was dedicated to John Allen's Gorre & Daphetid.

While serving in the U.S. Army in the 1960s, Andy was a frequent operator on the Gorre & Daphetid. One of John Allen's locomotives, No. 34, a 4-10-0 that John kitbashed from parts, resided in his office. He was also an operator on the MR&T while at Model Railroader. He was building a home layout in HO scale based on the AT&SF (Atchison Topeka & Santa Fe) at Cajon Pass, California, c. 1947. He retired from being executive editor of Model Railroader in August, 2011, but continued to contribute to the magazine's The Operators column until his death.

Sperandeo died on October 2, 2015, at the age of 70.
