= Ramadan Rush =

Ramadan Rush was coined in 2011 by the British media and embraced by the retail sector as it became noticeable that the UK was attracting huge numbers of wealthy Middle Eastern visitors around the time of Ramadan, which happened to fall on 1 August on this year.

In 2012 the New West End Company, the management company for retailers in Oxford Street, Bond Street and Regent Street explained; ‘The Ramadan Rush is a total phenomenon... It is worth millions to us (the UK) — last year there was about £120 million spent in the pre-Ramadan rush by Middle Eastern visitors, but it grows every single year. We expect it to be up ten per cent this year (2013)'. Many Bond Street and Mayfair retailers have catered for their luxury customers by opening later, hiring Arabic speaking staff, and providing tax refund services including Global Blue and Premier Tax Free.

As Ramadan dates change each year, the term 'Ramadan Rush' is also associated with the term 'Supercar Season' which occurs in July and August as wealthy Middle Eastern nationalities arrive in the UK to escape the heat of the Gulf States, taking their supercars with them.

== See also ==
- Ramadan in the United Kingdom
