= John Whitby Allen =

American model railroader

John Whitby Allen (July 2, 1913 – January 6, 1973) was a prominent American model railroader. He pioneered or developed several aspects of the hobby on his HO scale Gorre & Daphetid model railroad in Monterey, California, popularizing them with numerous magazine articles and photographs starting in the 1940s.

Allen was renowned for his skill at scratch building and creating scenery. He also pioneered the technique of weathering his models for a more realistic appearance. In addition to superdetailing locomotives, rolling stock, structures, and scenery, Allen was known for populating his model world with scale figures in humorous scenes. Other techniques Allen promoted were realistic train operation and the use of forced perspective to create the illusion of a model railroad layout larger than it really was.

== Early life ==
Born in Joplin, Missouri, Allen lost his father to typhoid fever when he was three; his mother died during the flu epidemic about nine years later. Allen lived with relatives in Missouri until attending school in Minnesota. There he developed rheumatic fever, and on the advice of a doctor, moved to California to live with an aunt and uncle. His health improved, but the rheumatic fever weakened his heart.

After completing high school, Allen attended UCLA, and joined the Reserve Officers' Training Corps (ROTC). He became comfortable around military people, and later recruited servicemen to help run the Gorre & Daphetid.

In 1934, Allen and his brother went to the World's Fair in Chicago, and saw scale model trains in operation, and he was impressed. He was attending UCLA studying economics, but switched to art school, which he attended for three years, specializing in photography. There he acquired the skills that set his layout and model photography apart.

In 1935, John's paternal grandparents died, leaving him about $1,900 ($44,618 today), then the equivalent of a year's salary for a middle-class man. John invested the money with the help of his brother, and in about 11 years, the value was such that he did not have to work. His investments, combined with a frugal lifestyle, resulted in a sum of over $500,000 at the time of his death.

After completing school, John and another student opened a photography business in the Westlake Park area of Los Angeles.

== World War II ==
Before World War II, Allen and his brother Andrew visited an uncle living near Oakland who had a model railroad. He became interested in working on it.

When the U.S. entered the war, Andrew joined the military and John offered his services as a photo analyst.

Allen came to Monterey, California, to visit his brother, and decided to stay. He opened a new photography shop on the main street with partner Weston Booth, and did a brisk business photographing servicemen. In 1946, John sold his business, invested the money, and retired.

== Model railroading ==
Allen said that he got into model railroading just before the end of the war. Due to a limited supply of hobby materials, he began building things from scratch. He spent a lot of time studying and observing railroads in operation, and how prototype equipment was built. Allen built models, then meticulously arranged and photographed them.

In July 1946, he published the first of many articles and photographs to appear in Model Railroader magazine: "How to make realistic model photos." Another photo was used for the cover of the December 1947 issue of Railroad Model Craftsman.

Over the next three decades, Allen produced many articles and photographs for prominent hobby magazines. His last feature article for a major model railroad magazine likely appeared in the March and April 1971 issues of Railroad Model Craftsman.

Allen also devised or inspired trends and ideas in the hobby. In 1948, his two-stall enginehouse took first award in the national model-railroading contest in the structures category. Wrote Westcott: "It aroused comment because John had modeled pigeons and their evidences along the ridge of the roof. Pigeons and other animate detail, once considered un-acceptable in this hobby, were given another look; and many a modeler began to humanize his railroad. While 'weathering' was not entirely new, the work of Allen and a few others in this period showed how effective it could be in adding atmosphere to otherwise very stiff-looking modelwork. This also created a trend."

Allen also devised "Timesaver", a well-known model railroad switching puzzle.

=== Gorre & Daphetid ===
Allen's model railroad, the HO scale Gorre & Daphetid, has been called "the world's most famous model railroad." Allen built three versions, each larger than the last.

==== Early version ====
He moved into a house in 1946 and began construction of the first version of the Gorre & Daphetid. (The name is a play on words; pronounced "Gory and Defeated.") In 1953 he needed more space, and decided to move. He offered a railroad for sale, with free house. When no one was interested in buying the house with the railroad, he dismantled it. The original 3.5 ft (1.1 m) by 6.5 ft (2.0 m) G&D was saved and incorporated into the final version, while other parts were given to friends.

==== Final version ====
Allen moved to his final house, chosen for its unfinished basement. He excavated the basement, poured a concrete floor and prepared it for construction of the final layout. He allocated about half the 1,200 sq ft (110 m^{2}) to the layout, with the remainder used as workshop and storage.

Allen built a scale model of the house to aid in planning, in addition to models of the layout he planned to build. His planning was very thorough. Early plans included the use of real water in scale rivers and lakes. Construction began in January 1954. One feature of the layout was Devil's Gulch, a part of the basement not excavated, but shaped, with concrete poured over it. Allen constructed the layout almost completely by himself. He devoted the next 20 years to this project.

During this period, Allen revolutionized model railroading with realistic operations, lighting (including night lighting), and weathering of models. He used forced perspective to enhance the illusion of realism, and only allowed photography under his conditions.

== Death and fire ==
John Allen suffered at least one heart attack in the 1960s. As his health declined, he continued to work to complete the Gorre & Daphetid. In a telephone conversation with Linn Westcott, he suggested that he would drive the last spike in the spring of 1973, and that Linn should come for a visit then. In 1972, he was already suggesting that things might not be going well, and wondering "what to do with the railroad" in letters to a friend. He suffered a fatal heart attack on the evening of January 6, 1973.

=== Fire ===
Ten days after Allen died, some friends gathered for an operating session and discussion on the preservation of the railroad in accordance with Allen's wishes. When they left, someone set a small gas furnace in the train room to 65 °F. Allen had rarely used the furnace, because he liked to keep the house cool, or possibly because it was not vented correctly. He had covered it with tar paper.

This caused a fire, investigators later determined, according to Linn Westcott's book Model Railroading with John Allen. The fire was quickly reported and extinguished fast enough to save the house, but it destroyed the final, still-unfinished incarnation of Allen's railroad. Linn Westcott was asked by John's brother Andrew Allen to see whether the layout could be salvaged. They tried to save the "French Gulch" section, but it collapsed as they moved it after two hours of work.

The damage was mainly contained to the layout room, and the house was rehabilitated and sold.

A few model railroad items attributed to Allen survive and have been authenticated.

== Legacy ==
The first wide public mention of Allen's death was an obituary penned by editor Tony Koester in the March 1973 issue of Railroad Model Craftsman. "John Allen was an institution, Although his material had appeared in print on countless occasions (the December 1947 issue of Railroad Model Craftsman featured a John Allen cover), reader enthusiasm for his well known HO scale Gorre & Daphetid never wore down," Koester wrote. "The hobby has lost an all-time great."

The April 1973 issue of Model Railroader magazine contained an obituary by editor Linn Westcott and a cover photo of Allen.

The January 2003 issue of Model Railroader contained a remembrance of him 30 years after his death.

Former Model Railroader editor Linn Westcott's final book, entitled Model Railroading with John Allen, was published posthumously in 1981. Westcott died in 1980 while writing the book. It contained various quotes and photographs from Allen demonstrating his techniques.

There is a video about John Allen's railroad by Sunday River Productions called The Gorre & Daphetid with footage shot by Richard Reynolds with a small intro by Glenn Beier who also operated on the G&D. Glenn Beier says "it is the only motion picture ever made of the world's most famous model railroad". Until February 2007, only a VHS copy of the video was for sale. Now both VHS and DVD versions are available.
