= Gorre & Daphetid =

The Gorre & Daphetid ([ˈɡɔːri], [dɪˈfiːtɪd]) model railroad was an HO-scale layout built by John Whitby Allen in Monterey, California.

Allen built three versions of the railroad, which was also known as "The Gorre" or just "The G&D". The first two were smaller and were built at Allen's house in Monterey. Allen subsequently moved to a new house, 9 Cielo Vista Terrace, and enlarged the basement to accommodate a third and largest version. This final version, which incorporated the earliest layout, was built over the course of 20 years. It is considered one of the greatest layouts of all time.

A professional photographer by trade, Allen created realistic model railroad scenes on the G&D. He published numerous articles about them in Model Railroader, the NMRA's Scale Rails, and Railroad Model Craftsman magazines.

The basement of the house was severely damaged by fire just ten days after Allen suffered a fatal heart attack in January 1973. Most of the layout was destroyed in the fire.

One of its locomotives, No. 34 (a 4-10-0 that John kitbashed from parts), survived in the office of Andy Sperandeo, who was at the time executive editor of Model Railroader and who had become a frequent visitor to the G&D while serving in the United States Army in California. Another 15 G&D locomotives were found in the attic of Bob Dupont, a past president of the NMRA, by Rod Smith, who sent them to Kenichi Matsumoto, according to the February 2020 issue of Model Railroader. G&D 10 was restored in 2017 and today is part of the NMRA exhibit at the California State Railroad Museum in Sacramento, California.

Numerous boxes of Allen's slides and prints are in storage at Kalmbach Publishing's corporate building in Waukesha, Wisconsin. Some of the boxes were singed by the flames of the fire that destroyed the G&D. Kalmbach Publishing published several editions of a book entitled Model Railroading with John Allen. Written by Allen's longtime friend Linn Westcott, it contains much information about the G&D.
