= Zinagizado =

Zinagizado is an electrochemical process that induces a ferrous metal to express anti-corrosive properties.A constant electric current is applied to break the bonds which are attached to the metal to be coated by forming a surface coating. The alloy used is called Zinag (Zn-Al-Ag); this alloy has excellent mechanical and corrosive properties, increasing the lifespan by 60%.

Zinag protects against corrosion and can be used in covering all kinds of steel metallic materials in contact with a corrosive medium. The anti-corrosive property has been obtained by the corrosion resistance of zinc achieved by aluminium and silver addition. Cathodic protection

This process was developed by Said Robles Casolco and Adrianni Zanatta.
