= Zinag =

Metallic alloy

Zinag is an alloy of three metallic materials (zinc, aluminium and silver), the composition of the alloy gives excellent mechanical and anticorrosive properties, this is an alloy of low density that can be used for many process such as automotive area, medical, aerospace, construction industry, etc., the silver gives the superplasticity which makes this alloy can be deformed without losing its mechanical properties.

With this alloy can be made different process such as: Zinagizado, Metal Foams.
