= Inglenook Sidings =

Railway shunting puzzle

Inglenook Sidings, created by Alan Wright (1928 - January 2005), is a model railway train shunting puzzle. It consists of a specific track layout, a set of initial conditions, a defined goal, and rules which must be obeyed while performing the shunting operations.

More broadly, in model railway usage inglenook may refer to a track layout (or portion thereof) that is based on or resembles the Inglenook Sidings puzzle.

== Details ==
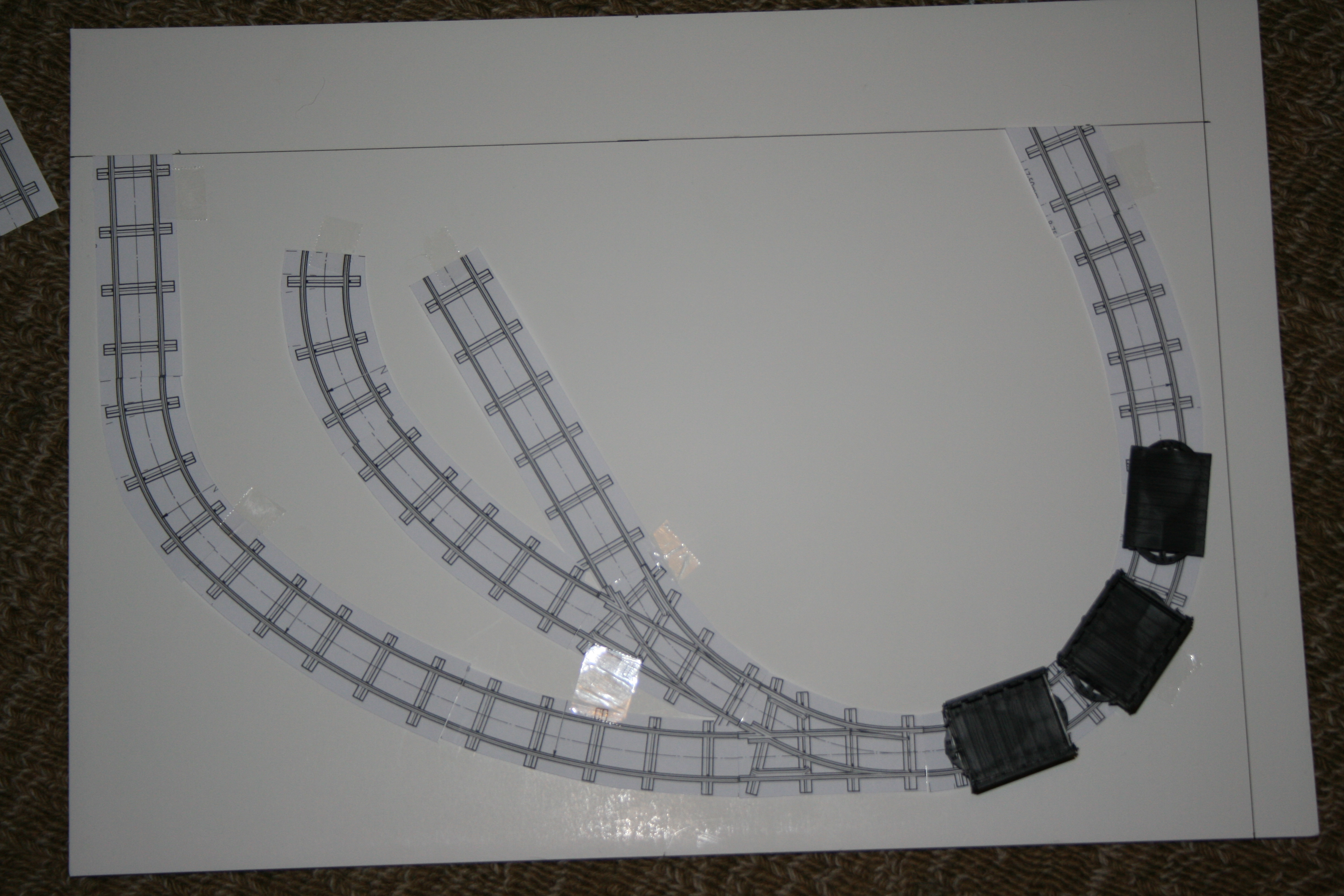
An O-14 Inglenook plan

The track is based on Kilham Sidings, on the Alnwick-Cornhill branch of the North Eastern Railway (NER). The sidings should be able to accommodate 5, 3, and 3 wagons, the leading spur accommodating 3 wagons and the locomotive. For the original version of the puzzle there are 8 wagons in the sidings, the rule being:

- Form a train of 5 wagons selected at random of a specific order from the 8 wagons.

== See also ==
- Timesaver, another shunting puzzle
