= Timesaver =

Model railroad train shunting puzzle

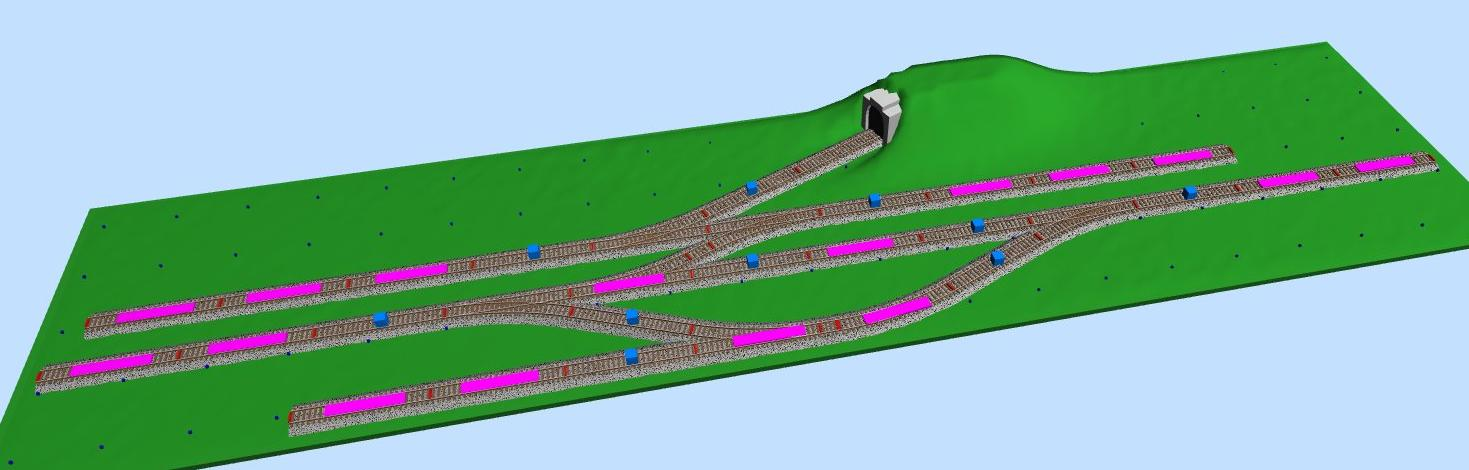
Timesaver: car locations in pink, uncouplers in blue

Timesaver is a well-known model railroad switching puzzle (U.K. English: shunting puzzle) created by John Allen. It consists of a specific track layout, a set of initial conditions, a defined goal, and rules that must be obeyed while performing the shunting operations.

The standard layout consists of a simple yard, with five switches (three lefthand, two righthand), five spurs, and a runaround track at the center. Power is supplied to the track, sufficient to run a locomotive at a fixed slow speed, controlled by a simple center-off reversing switch. Several freight cars are placed on the track, and the object is to move all of them to clearly marked destination positions.

== Variants and gameplay methods ==
Timesaver can be played as a game, with the object to complete a given puzzle in the shortest amount of time. (Time spent thinking counts the same as time spent actually moving cars, and the number of moves is irrelevant.) The switching game became a contest at National Model Railroad Association conventions.

Optionally, two Timesaver layouts can be connected with an unpowered interchange track (adding a sixth switch to each), with space for a single car. In this configuration, each player must (typically) exchange two "outbound" cars with the other. In this form, it becomes a cooperative board game. Because it can provide complex switching challenges in a small space, it has also been incorporated into a number of larger layouts.

Timesaver was first published in the November 1972 issue of Model Railroader, in what would be Allen's last article; he died the following year.

== See also ==
- Inglenook Sidings
