= McLaren W1 =

British sports car developed by McLaren Automotive

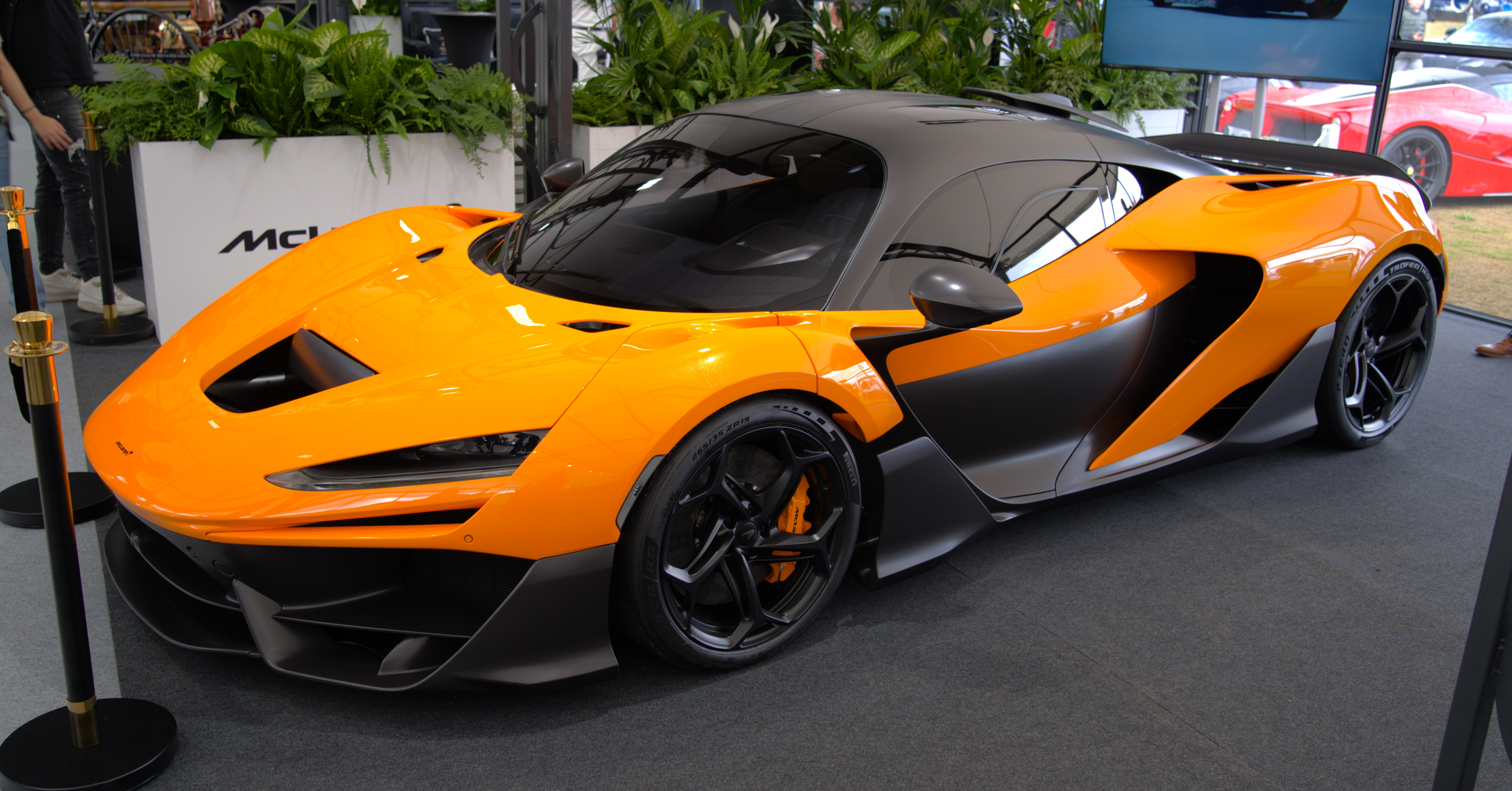
- The McLaren W1 launch car.

Overview
- Manufacturer: McLaren Automotive
- Model code: P18
- Production: January 2026 -
- Assembly: United Kingdom: Woking, Surrey
- Designer: Tobias Sühlmann (Chief Design Officer); João Dias (Principal Exterior Designer); Patrick Carton (Exterior Designer); Alex Alexiev (Principal Interior Designer)

Body and chassis
- Class: Sports car (S)
- Body style: 2-door coupe
- Layout: Longitudinal mid-engine, rear-wheel-drive
- Platform: McLaren Carbon Fibre Lightweight Architecture (MCLA)
- Doors: McLaren Anhedral Door (gull-wing)

Powertrain
- Engine: 3,988 cc (243 cu in) McLaren MHP-8 twin-turbo V8
- Electric motor: McLaren F1 E-Motor
- Power output: 1,275 PS (938 kW; 1,258 hp) @ 9,000 rpm; 1,340 N⋅m (988 lb⋅ft) @ 4,500 rpm; (combined)
- Transmission: In-house robotic 8-speed dual-clutch + electric reverse
- Plug-in charging: SAEJ1708

Dimensions
- Wheelbase: 2,680 mm (105.5 in)
- Length: 4,635 mm (182.5 in)
- Width: 2,191 mm (86.3 in)
- Height: 1,182 mm (46.5 in)
- Curb weight: dry weight: 1,399 kg (3,084 lb)

Chronology
- Predecessor: McLaren P1

The McLaren W1 is a limited-production hybrid sports car developed by McLaren Automotive. It is the successor to the McLaren P1. It was unveiled on October 6, 2024. Production was scheduled to commence in 2025, and was limited to 399 units.

== Specifications ==
McLaren reports the W1 as having a dry weight of 1,399 kg (3,084 lb) and a maximum power output of 1,275 PS (938 kW; 1,258 hp), resulting in a power-to-weight ratio of 911 PS/tonne. It features a hybrid powertrain, combining a 4.0-liter twin-turbo flat-plane crank V8 engine (designated MHP-8) with an electric module that includes a radial flux electric motor and a Motor Control Unit (MCU). The electric assistance is designed to improve throttle response and performance, with a total system output of 1,275 PS (938 kW) and 1,340 N⋅m (990 lbf⋅ft) of torque.

The W1 has an estimated top speed of 350 km/h (220 mph), capable of accelerating from 0-100 km/h (0-62 mph) in 2.7 seconds. From a standstill, the vehicle is able to reach 200 km/h (124 mph) in approximately 5.8 seconds.

Internal components feature a 62-liter fuel tank and onboard software intended for fuel-efficiency optimization.

== Design ==
The floor and footwell of the W1 are positioned higher than those of the P1, modifying airflow beneath the car. The active aerodynamics system has been updated, with the rear wing controlled by electric motors. The wing can raise, lower, and rotate, functioning as both a downforce aid and an air brake while also incorporating a DRS mode.

The W1's cooling system is structured to manage thermal loads, particularly in high-performance driving conditions. It incorporates three separate water-glycol circuits, each operating at different temperatures:

- A high-temperature circuit with four radiators for engine cooling.
- A low-temperature circuit for charge cooling.
- A dedicated hybrid cooling circuit for the E-module, battery, charger, and DC/DC converter.

A total of 10 heat exchangers are included to manage general cooling needs, including HVAC and oil cooling.

The W1 features an eight-speed dual-clutch transmission (DCT) designed to handle high torque levels. A hydraulic E-differential determines the torque split between the rear wheels, enhancing mid-corner traction.

The W1's E-module contributes up to 255 kW (347 PS) and is mounted beside the transmission. It features:

- A 4.98 MJ (1.384 kWh) battery designed for rapid power delivery.
- Active aero stemming from multiple downforce controls using the spoiler and front bumper.
- Second-generation dielectric immersion cooling for effective thermal management.
- Onboard charging capability, allowing the battery to be replenished to 80% in 22 minutes.
- McLaren’s Active Long Tail Rear Wing, providing multiple modes of downforce.

The W1 incorporates ground-effect aerodynamics, including an underbody that enhances airflow and downforce, drawing influence from the McLaren Formula 1 Team's engineering, and active aerodynamic elements, including an adjustable front splitter and rear wing.

Internal wind tunnel tests verify that the W1 has a maximum total downforce of 1,000 kgf (9.8 kN).
