= Car spotting (service) =

Car spotting is a service in rail transport operations.

A 1920 book on railroad freight defines the term as follows:

Spotting service is the service beyond a reasonably convenient point of interchange between road haul or connecting carriers, industrial plant tracks and includes: (a) One placement of a loaded car which the road haul or connecting carrier has transported, or (b) The taking out of a loaded car from a particular location in the plant for transportation by road haul or connecting carrier, (c) The handling of the empty car in the reverse direction.

== See also ==
- Car spotting (positioning)
