= Car spotting (positioning) =

Positioning of a railroad car for loading/unloading

Car spotting is precise positioning of a railroad car for loading/unloading.

When a locomotive pulls a train of freight cars to a loading/unloading station, it approximately positions them with respect to freight handling equipment, since locomotives are not well-suited for precise positioning. Therefore, special systems (car spotters) are invented for car spotting. Systems that handle strings (trains) of cars to spot them one after another are known as car progressors or car indexers.

== See also ==
- Car spotting (service)
- Heyl & Patterson Inc. - manufacturer of car indexers
- Train shunting puzzle
