= Supercar =

Luxury, high-performance sports car or grand tourer

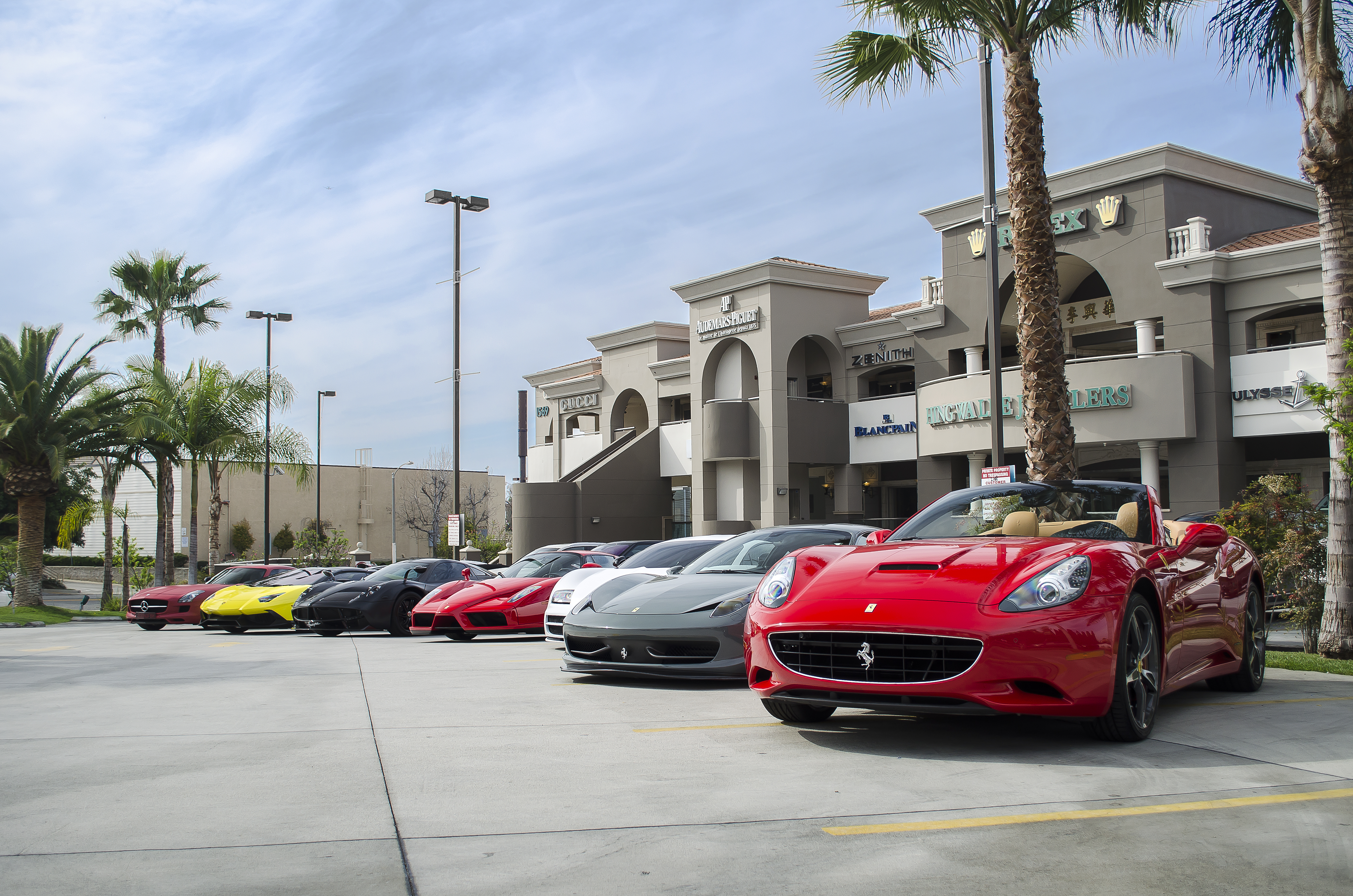
Examples of what some may consider supercars (from right to left): Ferrari California, Ferrari 458 Italia, Bugatti Veyron, Ferrari Enzo, Pagani Huayra, Lamborghini Aventador and Mercedes SLS AMG

A supercar, also known as an exotic car, is a street-legal sports car with race track-like power, speed, and handling, plus a certain subjective cachet linked to pedigree and/or exclusivity. The term 'supercar' is frequently used for the extreme fringe of powerful, low-bodied mid-engine luxury sportscars. A low-profile car may have limited ground clearance, but a handling-favorable center of gravity and a smaller frontal area than a front engined car. These characteristics can reduce supercars' aerodynamic drag, enabling higher top speeds. Since the 2000s, the term hypercar has come into use for the highest-performance supercars.

Supercars often serve as the flagship model within a vehicle manufacturer's sports car range and typically feature various performance-related technology derived from motorsports. Some examples include the Ferrari 458 Italia, Lamborghini Aventador, and McLaren 720S.

Automotive journalism typically reserves the predicate 'hypercar' for low (two- to low 4-figure) production-number cars, built over and above the marque's typical product line-up and carrying 21st century sales prices often exceeding a million euros, dollars, or pounds. Examples include the Porsche Carrera GT, Ford GT, and Ferrari F40/F50/Enzo lineage. Only a few car makers, like Bugatti, Pagani and Koenigsegg, exclusively make hypercars.

== History ==
=== Europe ===
The Lamborghini Miura, introduced in 1966 by the Italian manufacturer, is often said to be the first supercar. By the 1970s and 1980s, the term was in regular use for such a car, if not precisely defined. One interpretation up until the 1990s was to use it for mid-engine two-seat cars with at least eight cylinders (but typically a V12 engine), a power output of at least 400 bhp (298 kW) and a top speed of at least 180 mph (290 km/h). Other interpretations state that "it must be very fast, with sporting handling to match", "it should be sleek and eye-catching" and its price should be "one in a rarefied atmosphere of its own"; exclusivity – in terms of limited production volumes, such as those of the most elite models made by Ferrari or Lamborghini – is also an essential characteristic for some using the term. Some European manufacturers, such as McLaren, Pagani, and Koenigsegg, specialize in only producing supercars.

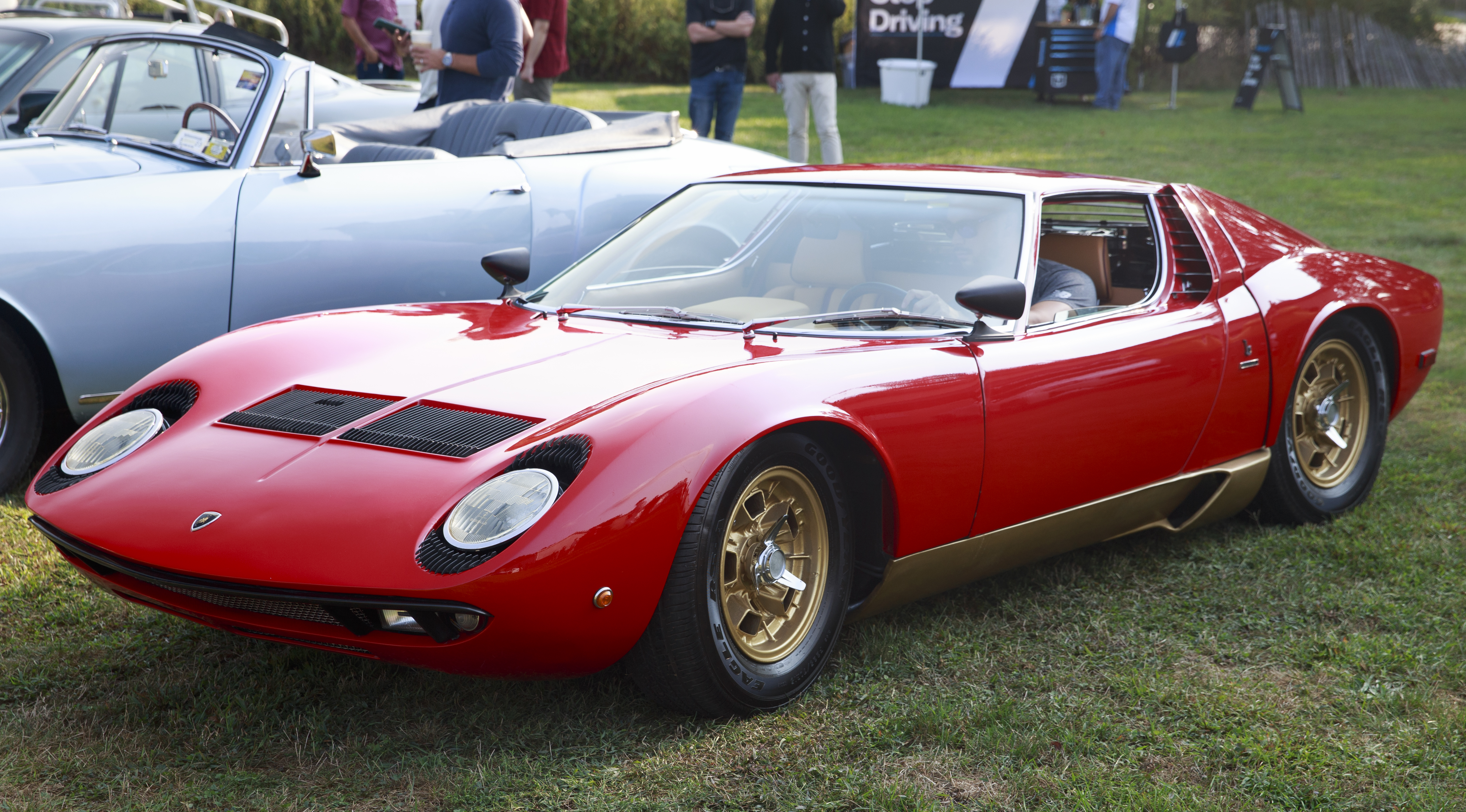
Lamborghini Miura P400 S

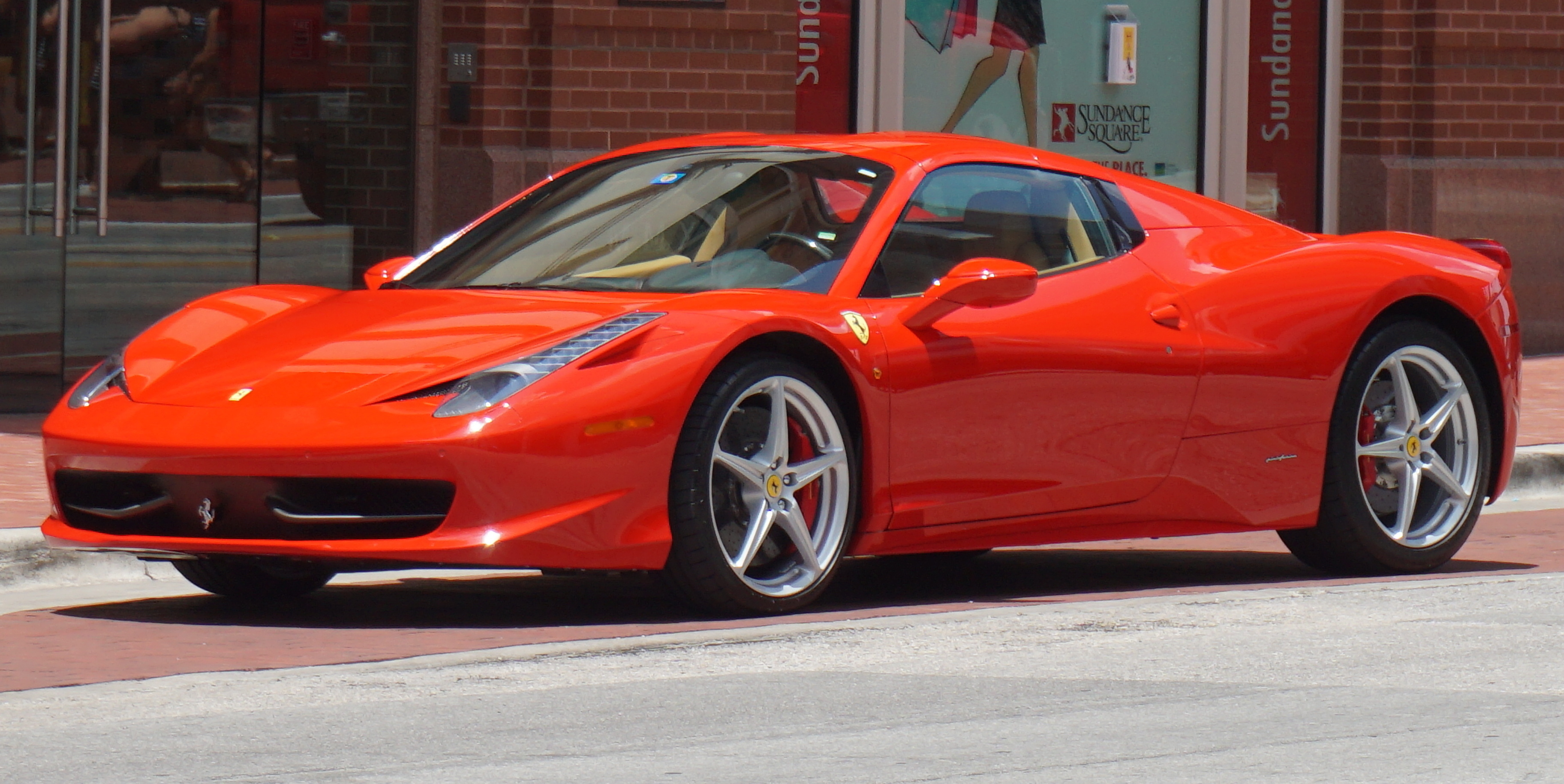
Ferrari 458

=== North America ===
During the 1960s, the highest-performance versions of American muscle cars were referred to as supercars. The description was sometimes spelled with a capital S. Its use reflected the intense competition for primacy in that market segment between U.S. manufacturers, retroactively characterized as the "horsepower wars". Already by 1965 the May issue of the American magazine Car Life included multiple references to supercars and "the supercar club", and a 1968 issue of Car & Driver magazine describes a "Supercar street racer gang" market segment. The "S/C" in the model name of the AMC S/C Rambler produced in 1969 as a street-legal racer is an abbreviation for "SuperCar".

Since the decline of the muscle car in the 1970s, the word supercar has been more broadly internationalized, coming to mean an "exotic" car that has high performance; interpretations of the term span from limited-production models produced by small manufacturers for performance enthusiasts to (less frequently) standard production cars modified for exceptional performance.

The 1990s and 2000s saw a rise in American supercars with similar characteristics to their European counterparts. Some American "Big Three" (i.e., General Motors, Chrysler, and Ford, the historic leaders of America's Detroit-based auto-industry) sports cars which have been referred to as supercars include contemporary Chevrolet Corvettes, the Dodge Viper, and the Ford GT. Supercars made by smaller American manufacturers include the Saleen S7, SSC Ultimate Aero, SSC Tuatara, Hennessey Venom GT, and Hennessey Venom F5.

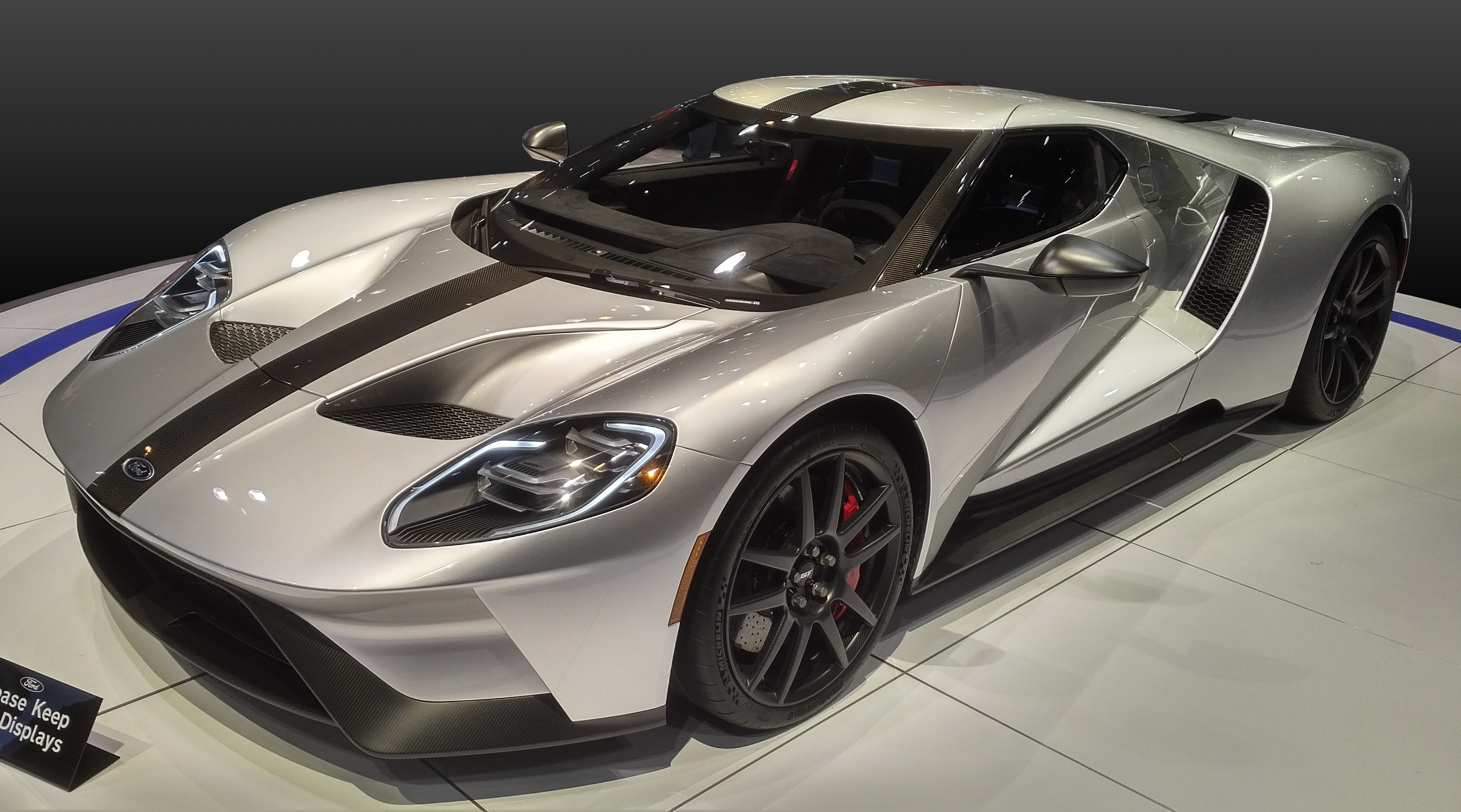
2018 Ford GT

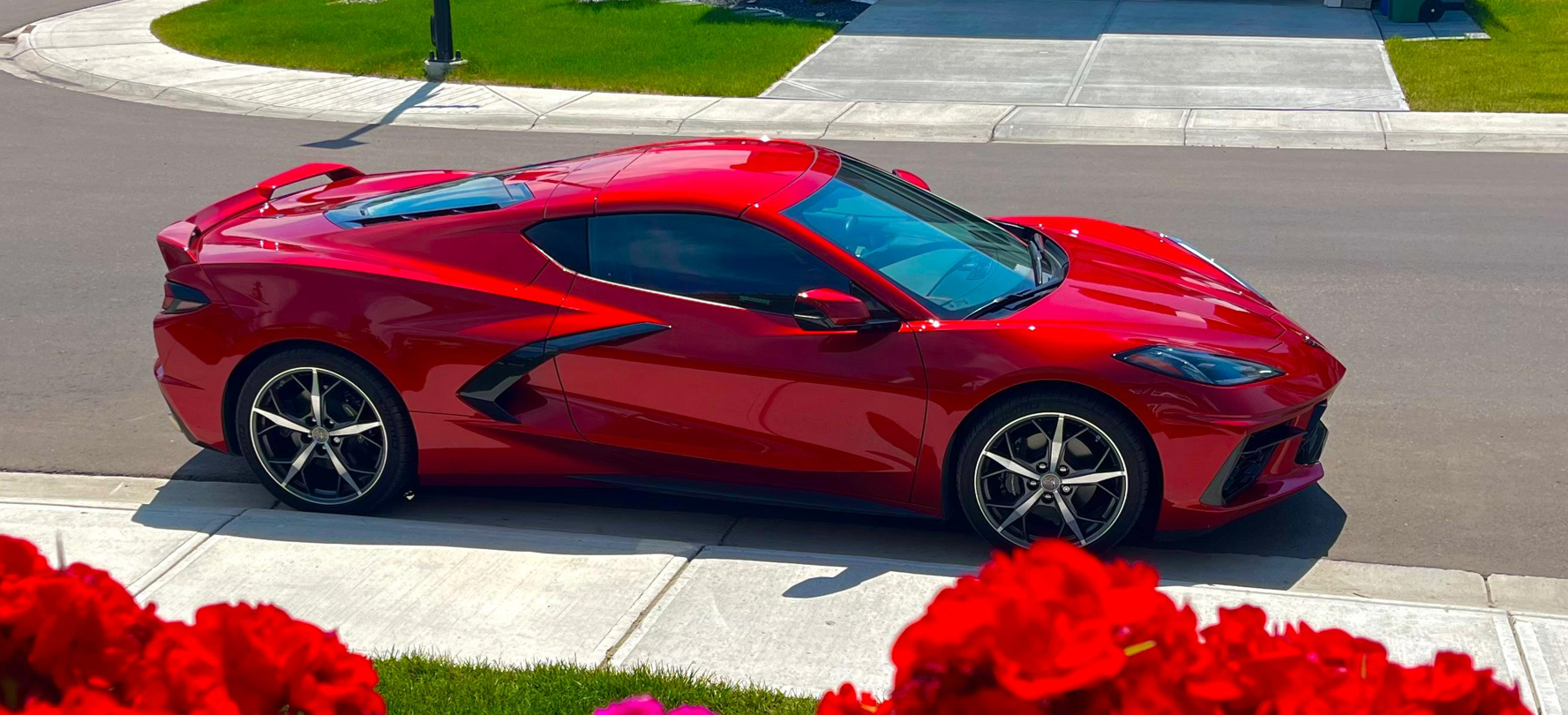
Corvette C8

=== East Asia ===
During the early 1990s, Japan began to gain global recognition for making high-performance sports cars; the automotive media described the lightweight, mid-engined, rear-wheel-drive, V6 Honda NSX produced from 1990 through 2005 as Japan's "first". Matching contemporary European supercars in performance and features, the NSX was more reliable and user-friendly.

In the 21st century, other Japanese makers produced supercars. From 2010 until 2012, Lexus marketed the Lexus LFA, a two-seat front-engine coupe powered by a 4.8 L (293 cu in) V10 engine producing 553 hp (412 kW; 561 PS). The 2009–present Nissan GT-R has been described as a modern supercar that delivers everyday practicality. It features a twin-turbo V6 producing between 473–710 hp (353–529 kW; 480–720 PS), with all-wheel-drive and a dual-clutch transmission.

The second generation Honda NSX made from 2016 until 2022 used all-wheel drive, a hybrid powertrain (producing up to 602 hp (449 kW; 610 PS)), turbocharging, and a dual-clutch transmission.

In recent years, China has also seen the emergence of a number of domestically produced supercars, most of which are new hybrid or electric vehicles, represented by the NIO EP9, Hongqi S9, Yangwang U9, Hyptec SSR and Denza Z.

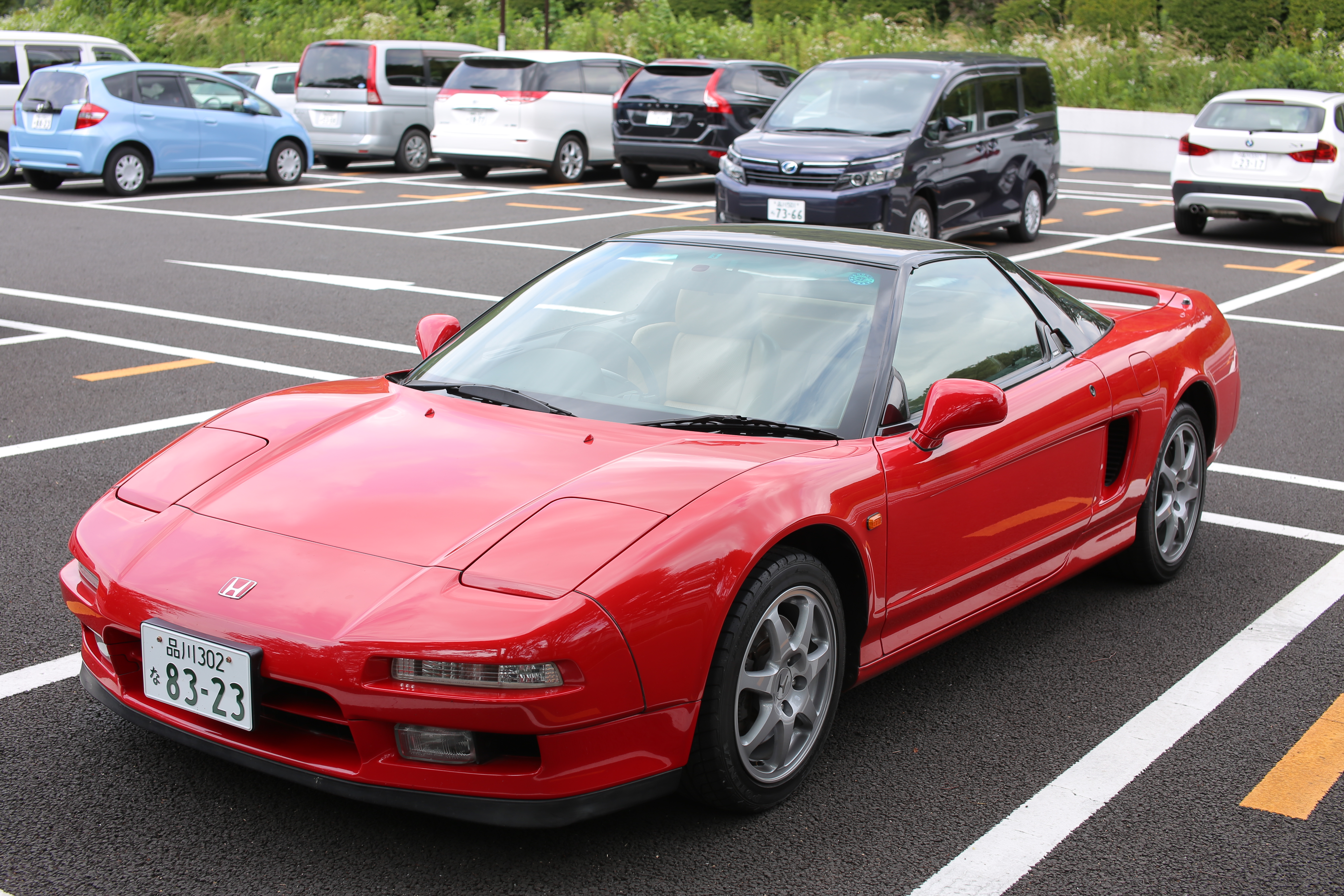
1997 Honda NSX

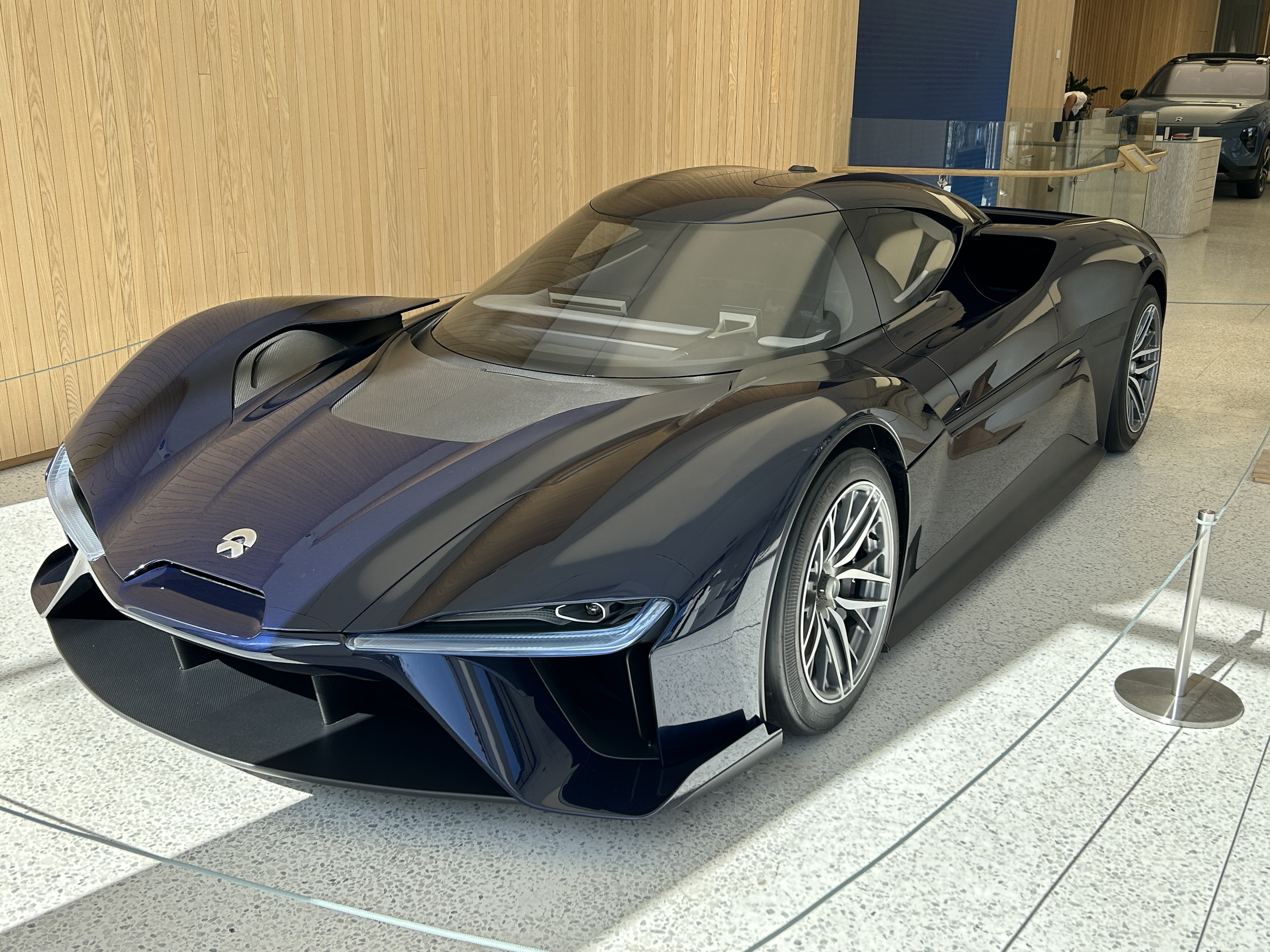
2024 Nio EP9

== Hypercar ==
Another term for high-performance sportscars is "hypercar", which is sometimes used to describe the highest-performing supercars. An extension of "supercar", it too lacks a set definition. One offered by the automotive magazine, The Drive, is "a limited-production, top-of-the-line supercar"; prices can reach or exceed US$1 million, and already had by 2017.

Some observers consider the tubular framed, first-ever production fuel-injection, world's fastest street-legal, 260 km/h (160 mph) 1954 Mercedes-Benz 300 SL "Gullwing" as the first hypercar; others the revolutionary, mid-engined 1967 Lamborghini Miura; others yet the 1993 McLaren F1 or 2005 Bugatti Veyron.

With a shift towards electrification, many new hypercars use a hybrid drivetrain, a trend started in 2013 with the McLaren P1, Porsche 918 Spyder, and LaFerrari, then continued in 2016 with the Koenigsegg Regera, in 2017 with the Mercedes-AMG One, the McLaren Speedtail, and in 2024 the exclusive Mclaren W1 and Ferrari F80 then later the American Corvette ZR1X.

Some modern hypercars, such as the Pininfarina Battista, NIO EP9, Rimac Nevera, and Lotus Evija, have also gone full-electric.

Hypercars have also been used as a base for the Le Mans Hypercar class after rule changes came into effect from 2021.

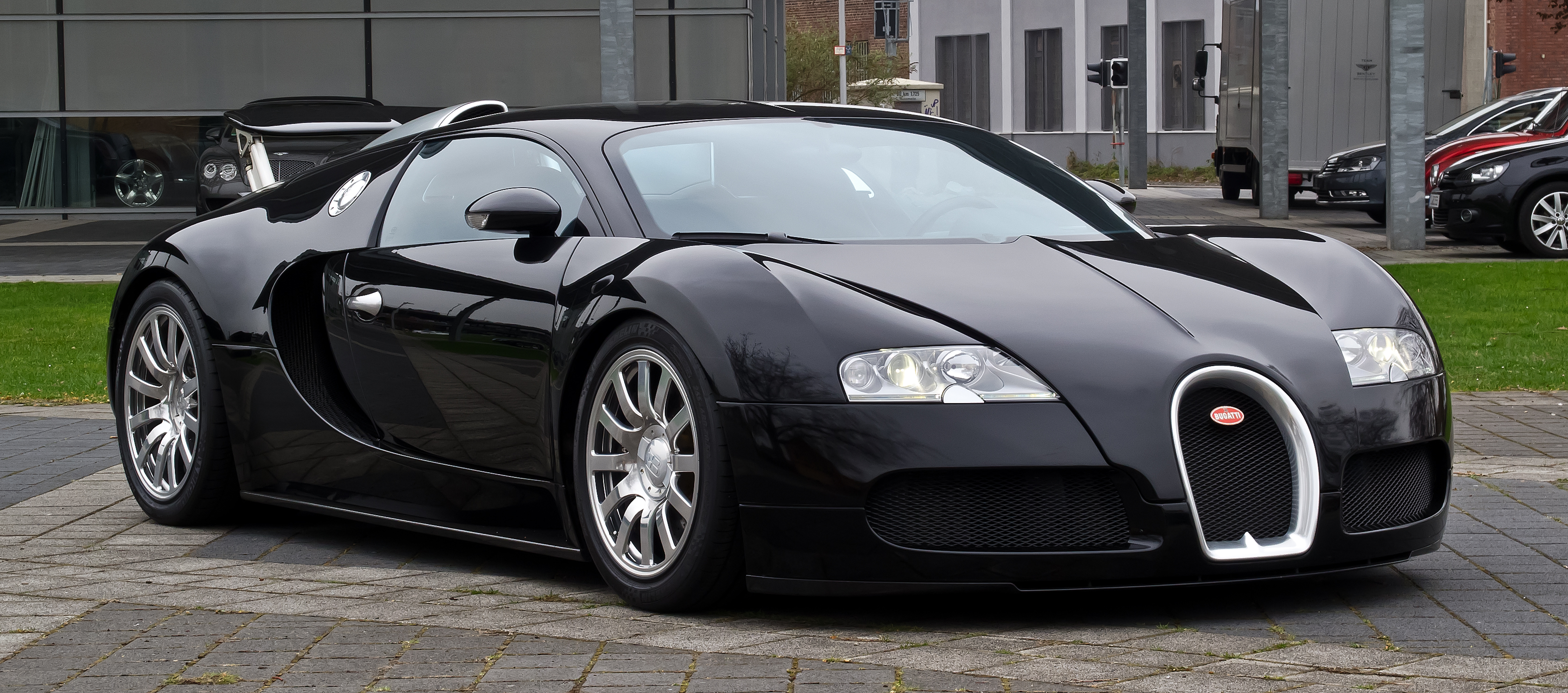
Bugatti Veyron 16.4

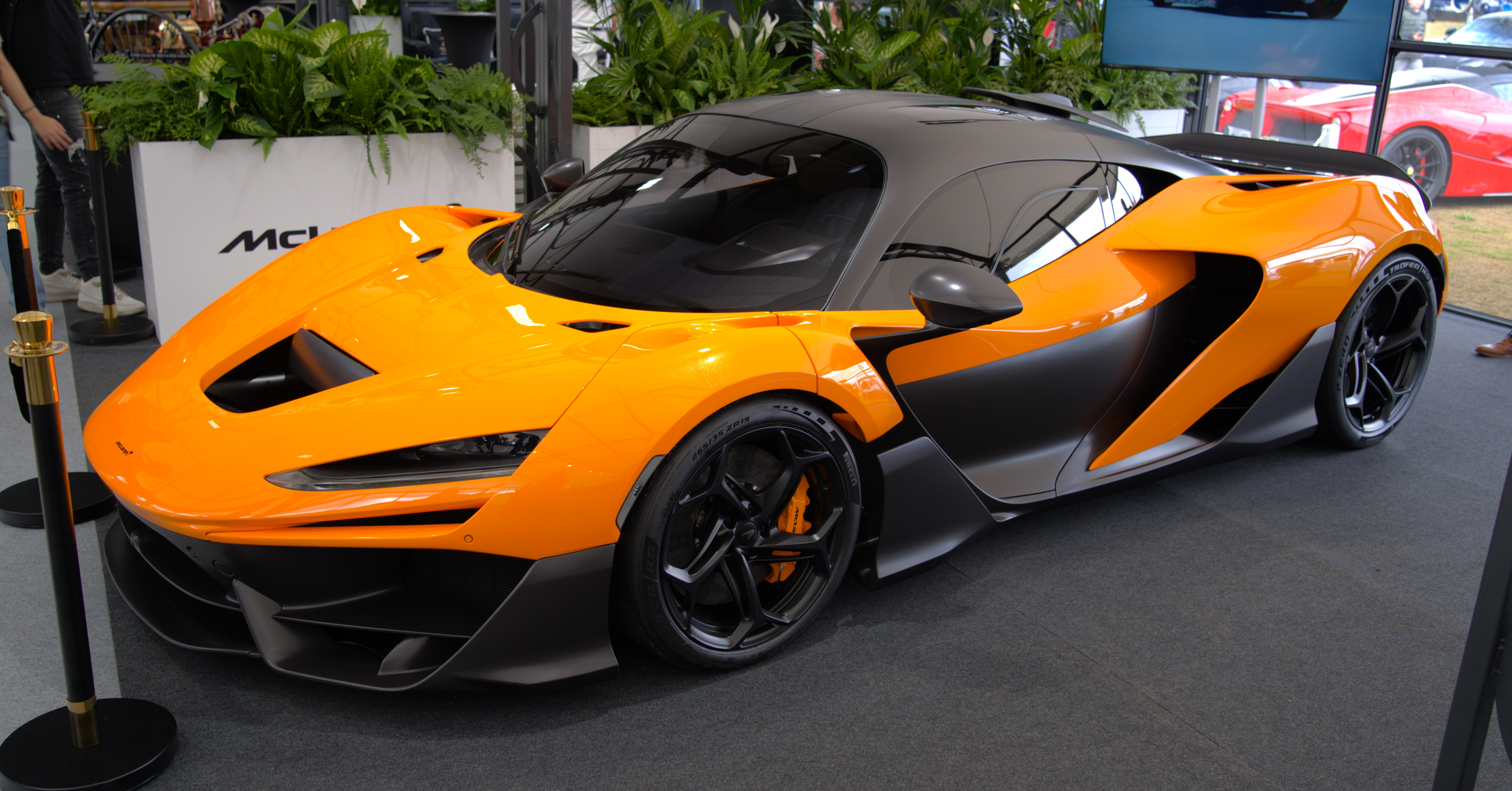
McLaren W1

== See also ==
- List of sports car manufacturers
- List of fastest production cars
- Supercar Season
