= Car spotting =

Observation hobby

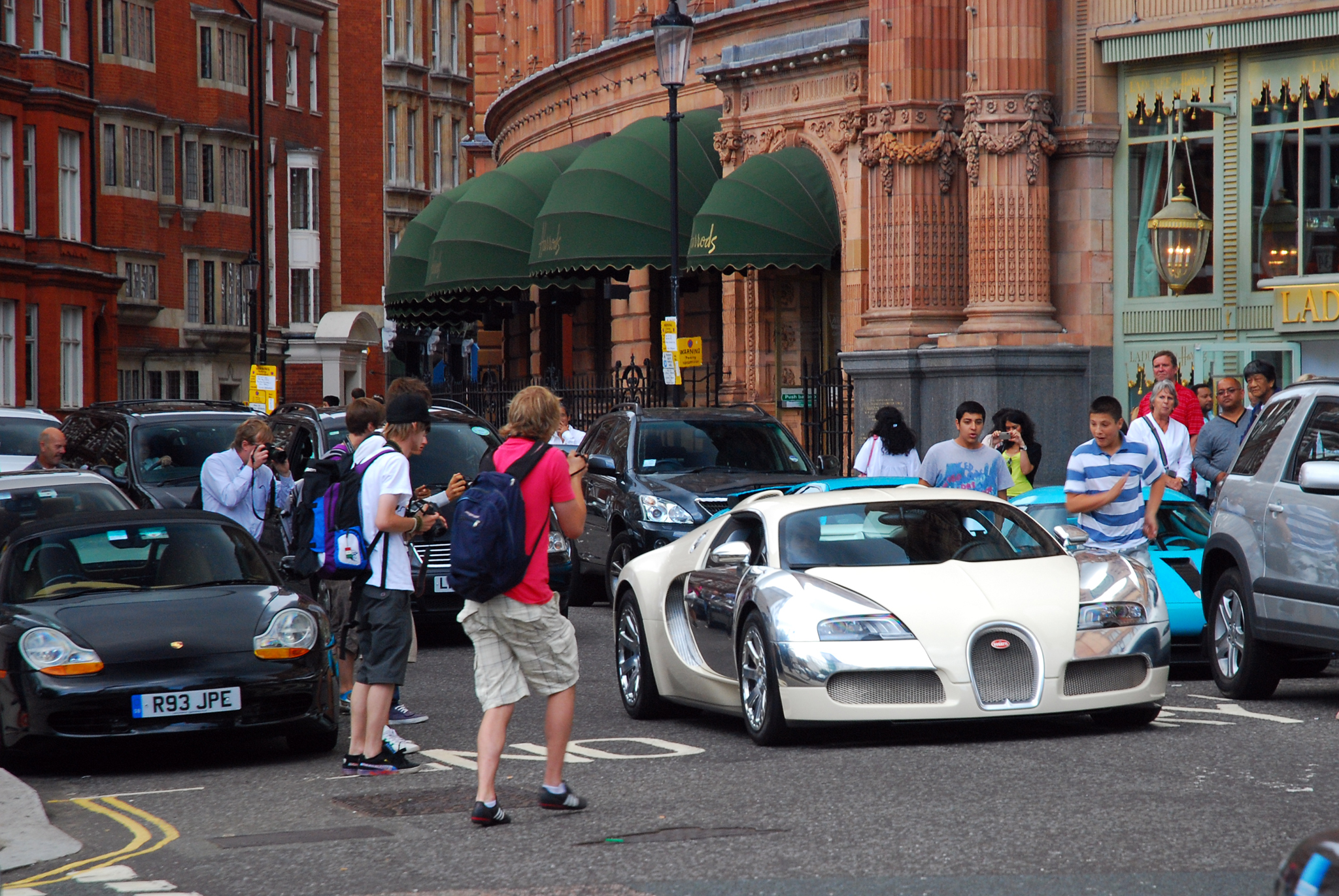
Car spotters observing and photographing a Bugatti Veyron outside Harrods in Knightsbridge, London, England

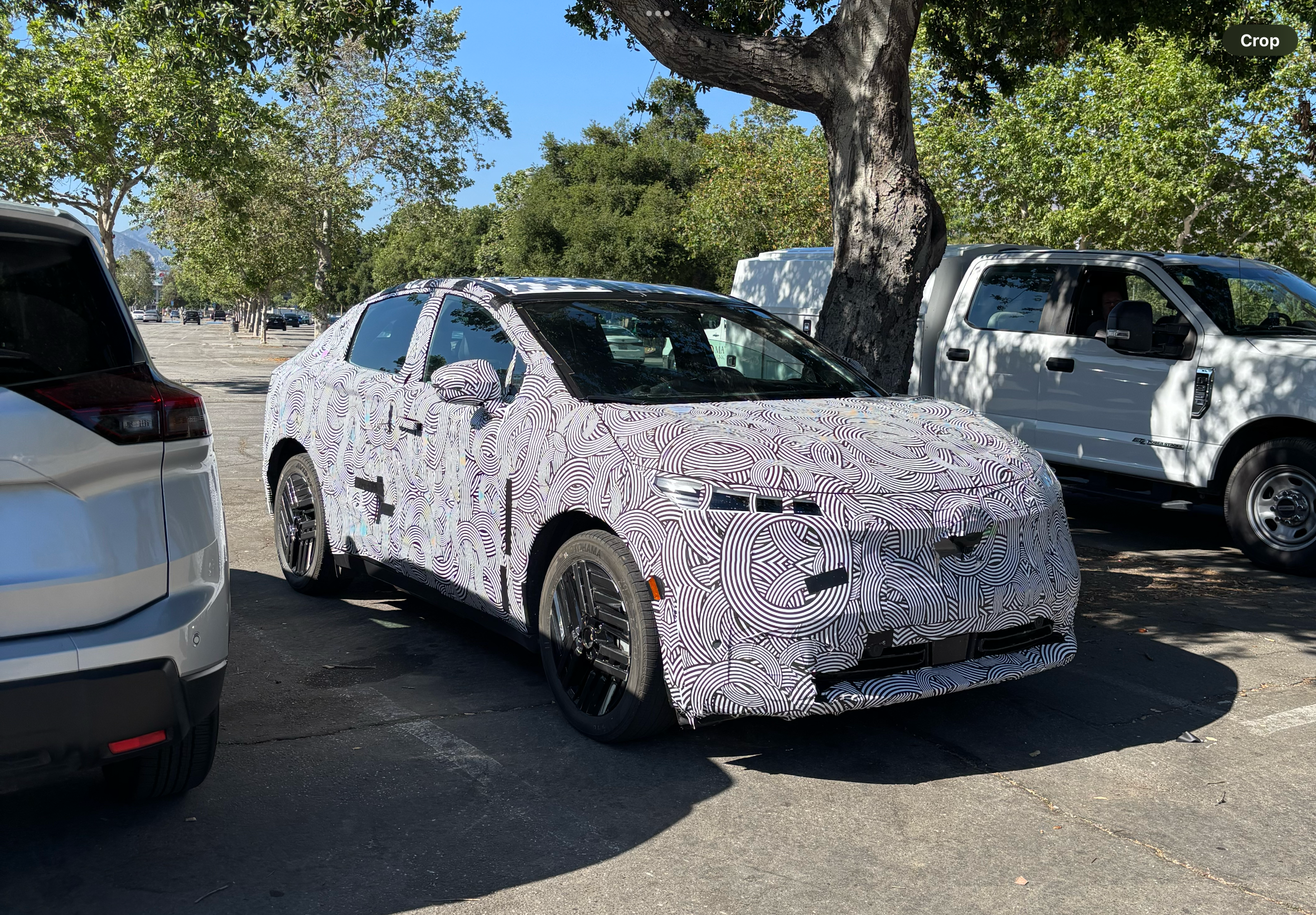
A camouflaged prototype, such as this pre-production Nissan Leaf, is one type of car that spotters look for.

A car spotter is a person who is typically strongly interested, in an amateur capacity, in car spotting, which is observing or photographing interesting, prototype, vintage, rare, modified, sports cars and exotic supercars. Car-spotters tend to express their individuality through their own photographs taken of their certain interests.

Car spotting can be done almost anywhere, but car shows and rallies attract large numbers of carspotters, These are traditional events that sparked the popularity behind car-spotting. Spotters may post their photos on social media or dedicated carspotting websites, or publish newspapers and books. Car-spotting became popular at auto-shows, with the New York International Auto Show, LA Auto Show, Paris and Tokyo, bringing car enthusiasts spotting design and the growth of cars. As times advance, more niche events, such as cars and coffee and brand-deals bring large followings of car-spotters through social media.

== See also ==
- Car culture
- Street photography
