= Timeline of electric vehicles =

Timeline of vehicles that run on electricity

The following is a timeline of electric vehicles, including cars, bicycles, aircraft and watercraft.

== 19th century ==
=== 1875 ===
- World's first electric tram line operated in Sestroretsk near Saint Petersburg, Russia, invented and tested by Fyodor Pirotsky.

=== 1880s ===
- Immisch & Co, established by Moritz Immisch, establishes an electric boat department - probably the world's first fleet of electric launches for hire, with a chain of electrical charging stations established along the River Thames.

==== 1881 ====
- World's first commercially successful electric tram, the Gross-Lichterfelde tramway in Lichterfelde near Berlin in Germany built by Werner von Siemens who contacted Pirotsky. It initially drew current from the rails, with overhead wire being installed in 1883.

==== 1882 ====
- The trolleybus dates back to 29 April 1882, when Dr. Ernst Werner Siemens demonstrated his "Elektromote" in a Berlin suburb. This experiment continued until 13 June 1882.
- Anthony Reckenzaun designs the first significant electric launch driven by storage batteries, and names the boat Electricity.

==== 1883 ====
- Mödling and Hinterbrühl Tram, Vienna, Austria, first electric tram powered by overhead wire.

==== 1884 ====
- Thomas Parker built an electric car in Wolverhampton using his own specially designed high-capacity rechargeable batteries.

==== 1888 ====
- 8 September: Peral, the first successful submarine to be entirely powered by electric batteries and the first fully military-capable submarine, is launched.

== 20th century ==
=== 1970s ===
==== 1973 ====
- 23 October: first crewed free flight by an electrically powered aeroplane, the MB-E1 (9 minutes)

==== 1974 ====
- AstroFlight Sunrise makes maiden flight, first aircraft to fly on solar power.

==== 1979 ====
- The Mauro Solar Riser becomes the first crewed aircraft to fly on solar power.

=== 1990s ===
==== 1996 ====
- December: Launch of the limited production General Motors EV1

==== 1997 ====
- Toyota RAV4 EV becomes first plug-in electric production SUV. Leases are mostly restricted to governments and businesses in California.
- Toyota Prius becomes the first mass-produced hybrid vehicle.

==== 1998 ====
- Launch of Nissan Altra EV, becoming the first highway legal electric car to use lithium-ion batteries

== 21st century ==
=== 2000s ===
==== 2003 ====
- first certificate of airworthiness for an electric powered aircraft was granted to the Lange Antares 20E.

==== 2008 ====
- Tesla Roadster becomes the first highway legal, serial production, all-electric car to use lithium-ion battery cells, and the first production all-electric car with a range of more than 200 miles (320 km) per charge.

==== 2009 ====
- July: Launch of the Mitsubishi i-MiEV, the first modern highway legal series production electric car

=== 2010s ===
==== 2010 ====
- 8 July: Solar Impulse 1 achieves the world's first crewed 26-hour solar-powered flight, as well as the longest and highest ever flown by a crewed solar-powered aircraft.
- December: Nissan Leaf and Chevrolet Volt deliveries began

==== 2011 ====
- The Nissan Leaf passed the Mitsubishi i MiEV as the world's all-time best selling all-electric car
- Taurus Electro G2 becomes the first two-seat electric aircraft to have achieved series production.

==== 2012 ====
- June:
  - Solar Impulse 1 achieves first intercontinental flight by a solar aircraft, flying from Madrid, Spain to Rabat, Morocco.
  - Launch of the Tesla Model S

==== 2014 ====
- March: 1% of all cars in use in Norway are plug-ins
- first production-model all-electric school bus was delivered to the Kings Canyon Unified School District in California's San Joaquin Valley

==== 2015 ====
- 3 July: Solar Impulse 2 lands in Hawaii on 3 July, setting new records for the world's longest solar-powered flight both by time (117 hours, 52 minutes) and distance (7,212 km; 4,481 mi). The flight's duration was also a record for longest solo flight, by time, for any aircraft.
- September: Cumulative global plug-in sales passed 1 million units.

==== 2016 ====
- June 20-23: Solar Impulse 2 makes the first non-stop solar-powered transatlantic flight
- July: Solar Impulse 2 lands in Abu Dhabi, completing circumnavigation of the world
- November: Global all-electric car/van sales passed 1 million.
- December:
  - Cumulative global plug-in sales passed 2 million units
  - 5% of passenger cars on Norwegian roads are plug-ins

==== 2017 ====
- Early: 1 millionth domestic new energy car sold in China
- July: Launch of the Tesla Model 3
- November: Cumulative global plug-in sales passed 3 million units
- December:
  - Annual global sales passed the 1 million unit mark
  - 5% of all cars in use in Norway are all-electric.
  - Annual global market share passed 1% for the first time

==== 2018 ====
- First half: 1 millionth plug-in electric car sold in Europe
- September:
  - 1 millionth plug-in electric car sold in the U.S.
  - 2 millionth new energy vehicle sold in China (includes heavy-duty commercial vehicles)
- October: 10% of passenger cars on Norwegian roads are plug-ins
- November: 500,000th plug-in car sold in California
- December:
  - Annual global sales passed the 2 million unit mark
  - Tesla Model 3 becomes first plug-in to exceed 100,000 sales in a single year

==== 2019 ====
- December: One out of two new passenger cars registered in Norway in 2019 was a plug-in electric car

=== 2020s ===
==== 2020 ====
- Early: The Tesla Model 3 surpassed the Nissan Leaf as the world's best selling plug-in electric car in history
- March:
  - The Tesla Model 3 is the first electric car to sell more than 500,000 units since inception.
  - Tesla, Inc. becomes the first auto manufacturer to produce 1 million electric cars
- April: 10% of all cars on the road in Norway are all-electric
- June: the Velis Electro variant of the two-seat Pipistrel Virus was the first electric aircraft to secure type certification, from the EASA
- December:
  - Nissan Leaf global sales reached 500,000 units.
  - Cumulative global plug-in car sales passed the 10 million unit milestone
  - The Norwegian plug-in car segment achieved a record annual market share of 74.7% of new car sales.
  - Over 15% of all cars on Norwegian roads are plug-in electric.

==== 2021 ====
- September: Rivian R1T becomes the first plug-in electric production pickup truck.

==== 2022 ====
- May: Cumulative global plug-in car sales passed the 20 million unit milestone

==== 2023 ====
- January: EV cars surpass 10% in global market share
- May: Tesla Model Y becomes the world's best selling vehicle

==== 2025 ====
- June: Kyle Clark, the founder and CEO of the Burlington, Vermont-based company BETA Technologies, piloted the Alia CX300 to the John F. Kennedy International Airport tarmack, concluding a 45-minute, 72-nautical mile-flight that took off from East Hampton, accomplishing the first-ever passenger flight of an electric-powered plane in North America.
