= Brighton Toy and Model Museum =

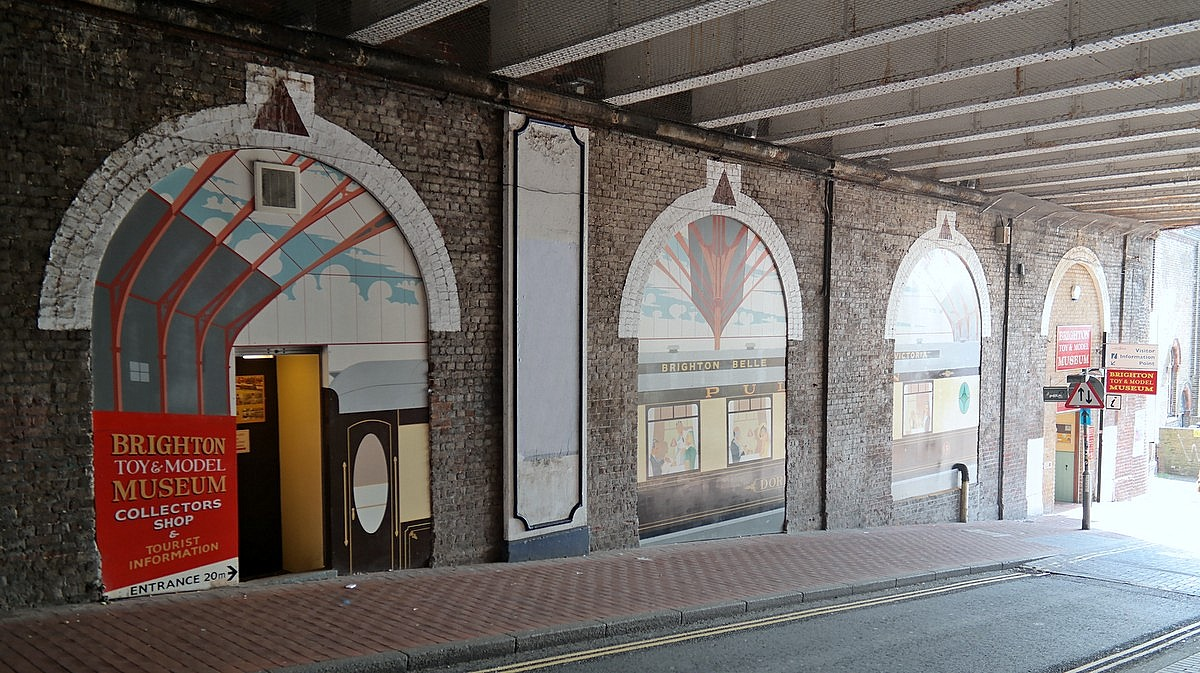
- Brighton Toy and Model Museum, with Brighton Belle mural

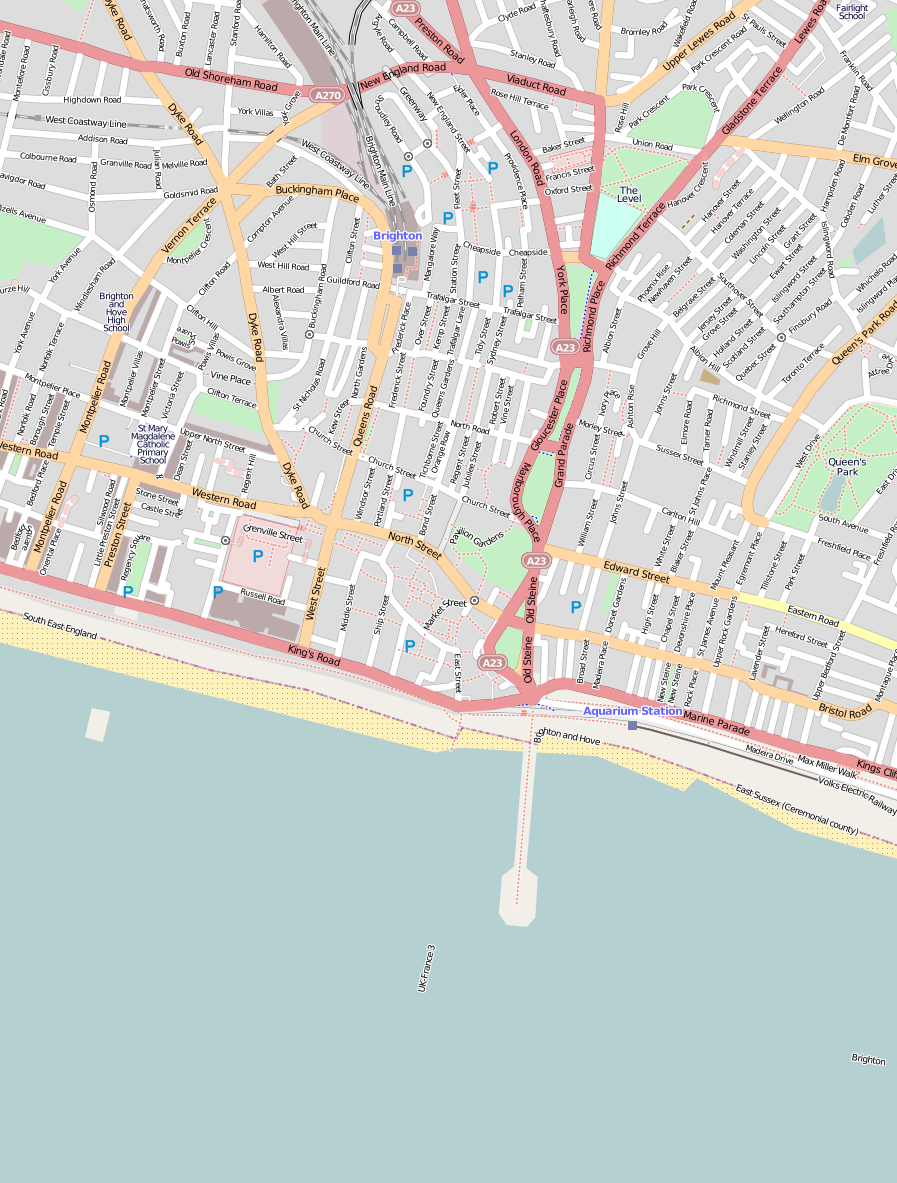
- Location within Brighton
- Established: 1991
- Location: 52–55 Trafalgar Street, Brighton, East Sussex, BN1 4EB, England
- Coordinates: 50.828611°N 0.140833°W
- Type: Toy museum, Model museum
- Accreditation: Arts Council England
- Collections: pre-1900, 1900–~1960s
- Collection size: 10,000
- Founder: Christopher Littledale
- Director: Christopher Littledale
- Public transit access: Brighton station, beneath the station cab rank. Exit the front of the station (Queens Road), and locate the "tunnel" entrance to Trafalgar Street between the railings outside Marks & Spencers.
- Website: www.brightontoymuseum.co.uk

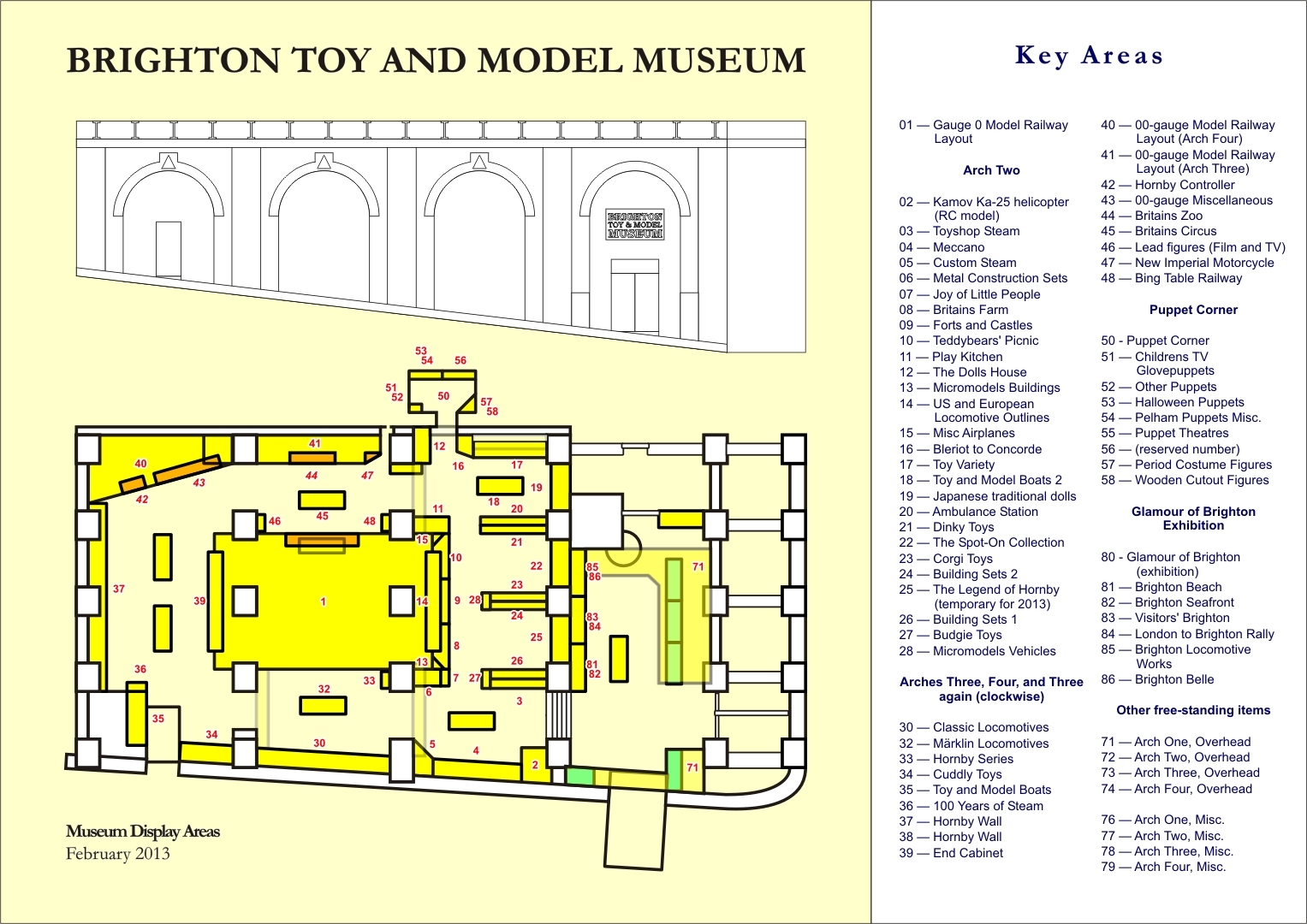
Brighton Toy and Model Museum's layout, its main display areas and their ID numbers

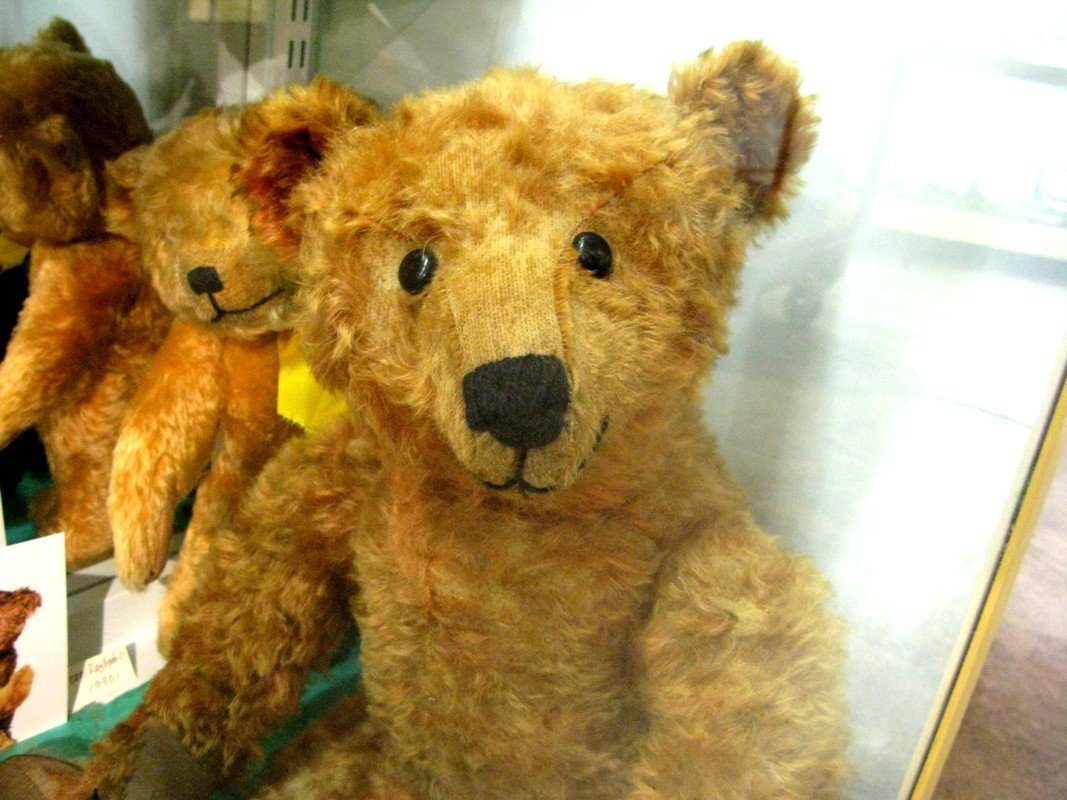
George the Steiff Bear, museum ambassador and childhood bear of Chris Littledale, and of his father before him)

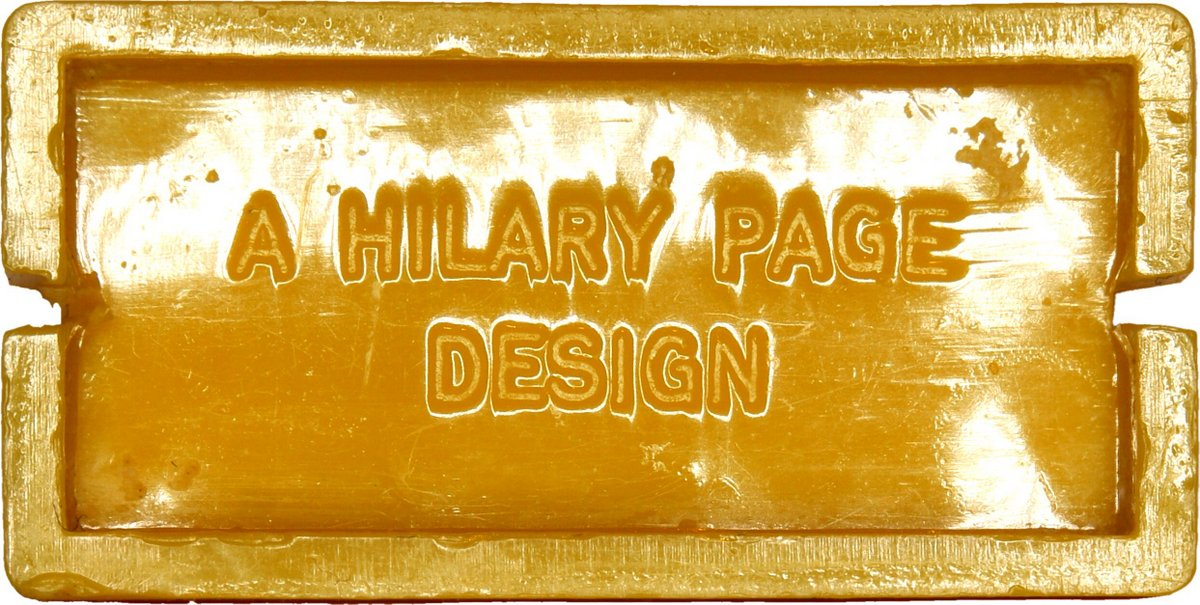
The Museum showcases a range of early construction set and building set systems. Underside of a Hilary Page Kiddicraft Self-Locking Building Brick, the predecessor to Lego.

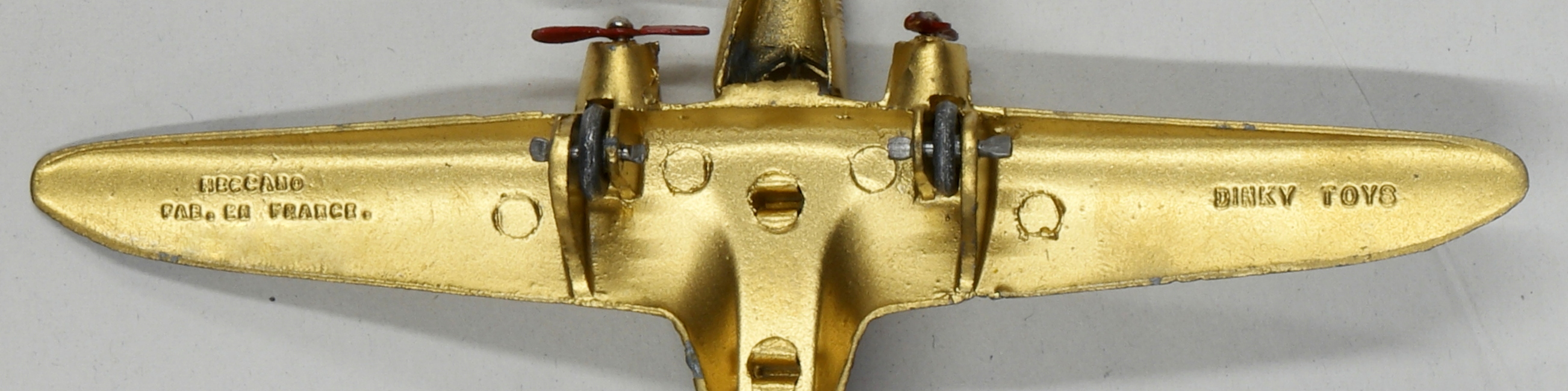
Underside of a gold pre-war (1930s) Dinky Toys diecast MAZAK model of a French Cousinet 10 "Arc en Ciel" ("rainbow") airliner, showing "Meccano" "Fab en France" markings. Manufactured by Meccano Paris, and available in the UK as Dinky Toys model 60A. For many of the early Dinky Toys models (especially the more slender castings such as aircraft), surviving examples in good condition can be very rare, as contaminants in the manufacturing process made them liable to eventual warping, cracking, and/or complete disintegration...

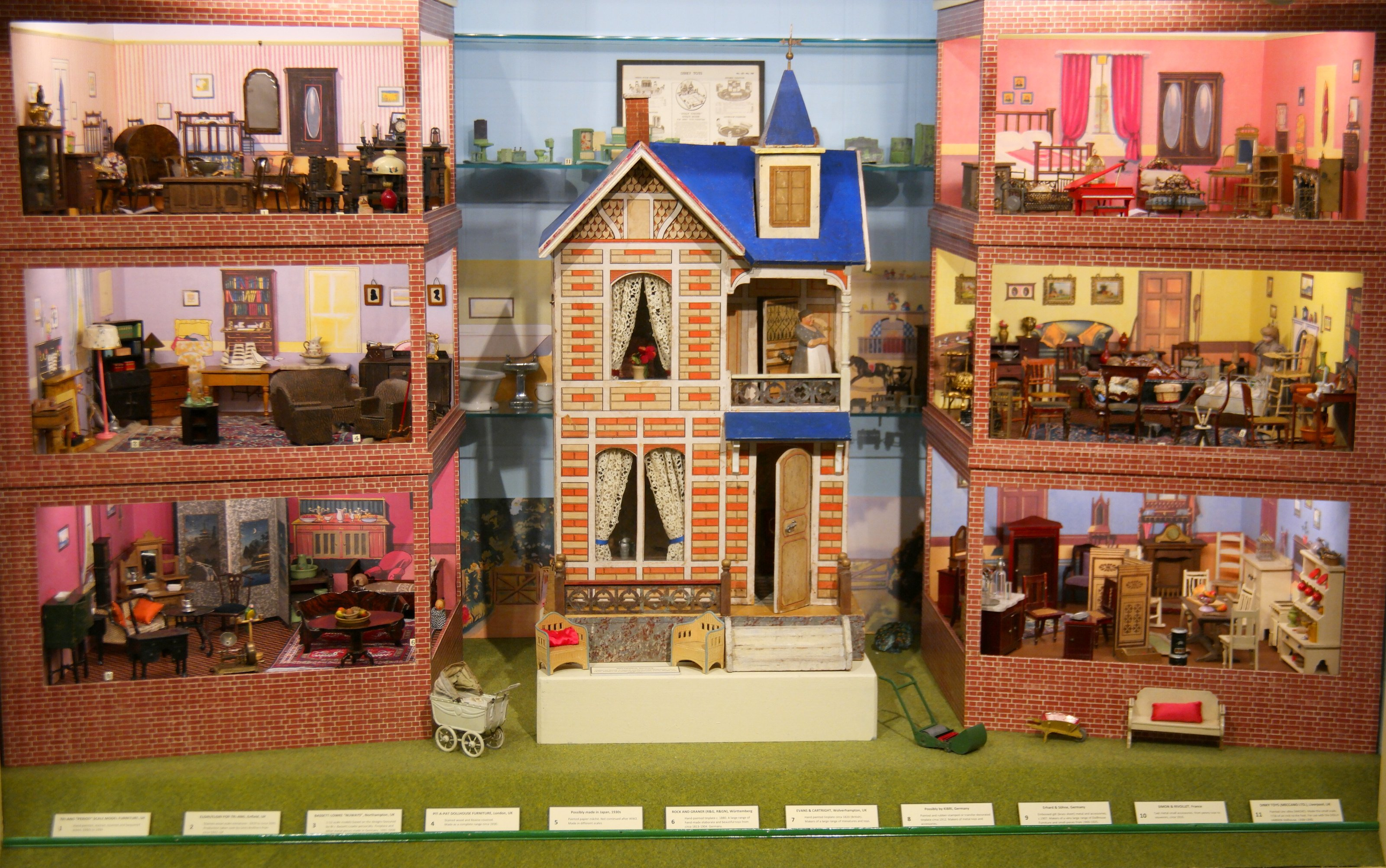
Moritz Gottschalk -style dollhouse and six rooms of early dollhouse miniatures, 2016

Brighton Toy and Model Museum (sometimes referred to as Brighton Toy Museum) is an independent toy museum situated in Brighton, East Sussex (registered charity no. 1001560). Founded in 1991, the museum holds over ten thousand toys and models, and occupies four thousand square feet of floor space within four of the early Victorian arches supporting the forecourt of Brighton railway station.

The model collection focuses on exhibition-grade engineered models, and large overhead radio-controlled aircraft (fixed-wing aircraft mostly by Denis Hefford, and helicopters by Gordon Bowd),

The toy collection focuses on commercially produced toys that would have been available in UK toyshops up until the 1950s and 1960s. Manufacturers and brands represented include Anchor Blocks, Brickplayer, Britains Ltd., Bayko, Bing, Bassett-Lowke, Budgie Toys, Georges Carette, Corgi Toys, Dinky, Hornby Trains, Lotts Bricks, Märklin, Matchbox, Meccano, Mettoy, Minibrix, Minic Ships, Pelham Puppets, Primus Engineering, Rock & Graner, Signalling Equipment Limited, Steiff, Skybirds, Spot-On, Tri-ang (Lines Brothers) and Trix.

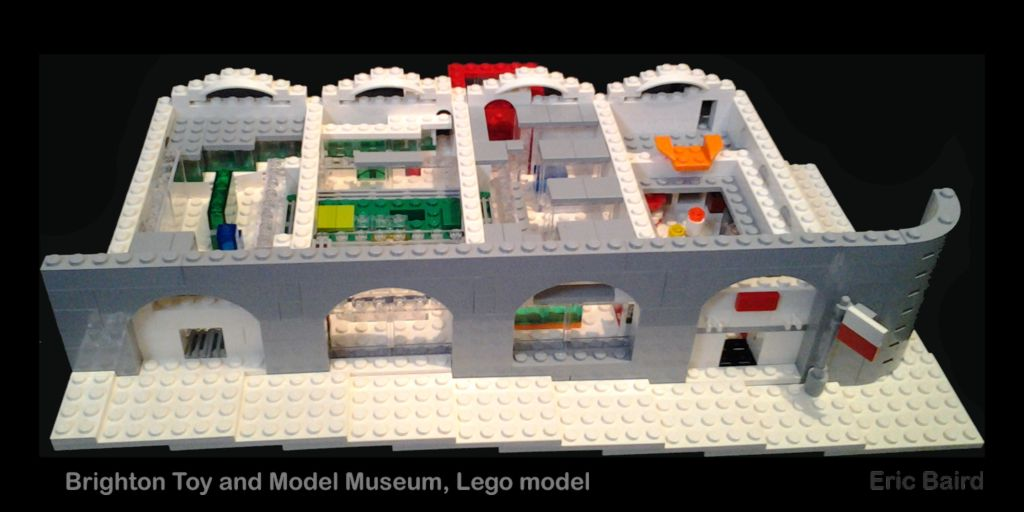
The museum and its internal layout, with display areas rendered in Lego

The museum also features a large 1930s-era gauge 0 model railway layout and two smaller modern 00-gauge layouts (pushbutton-operated), dollhouses, and mechanical coin-operated penny arcade machines, originally from John Hayward's Slot Machine Museum at the Palace Pier.

== History ==
=== History of the building ===
The museum occupies a set of Victorian brick arches that were built to support a station forecourt and a bridge over Trafalgar Street to connect the front of David Mocatta's 1841 station building with Queen's Road (1845), which had been created to provide easier access to the station than Trafalgar Street (whose slope could be difficult for horses to climb). The space was originally used to store beer barrels for a brewery, and three of the arches outside still show a red equilateral triangle, the registered trademark of Bass Brewery, the first trademark in the UK (Trademark 000001) . The current museum entrance held stalls for four dray horses (now museum offices and toilets) and a corn storage silo. The arches count as part of the larger station structure and are Grade II* listed (entry 1380797) The structure is also one of a number of buildings in Brighton that are reputed to be haunted.

The space was acquired and renovated for the museum in 1990.

=== Christopher Littledale ===
The museum's Founder-Director Chris Littledale had been a collector since he was a child, and had worked for an architectural modelmaking firm and as a consultant (model railways) for auctioneer Christie's. This gave him a network of friends who were also serious collectors, and the group decided to look for a site that could be converted into a museum, based around Chris' 1930s model railway layout and collection, and supplemented by their further collections.

The derelict site was leased and overhauled in 1990, Chris' layout transplanted from his workshop at the British Engineerium, cabinetry installed, and the museum opened in 1991.

The collections have continued to expand since, thanks to acquisitions and donations.

=== The Littledale-Brough Trust ===
In 1994 it was decided to give the collections an additional level of security by placing them in a separate trust, the Littledale Brough Trust ("LBT"). The use of a separate trust ensures that the collection exists as a separate entity, and that should the museum ever close, the collection cannot be sold off and dispersed, but will persist until it finds another suitable home.

== Layout ==
=== Museum lobby ===
Entrance to the first arch of the museum, containing the foyer/shop area and the Brighton Visitor Information Point, is free. This area provides free maps and brochures, and has a small "stocking filler" toy shop used by visiting school trips, secondhand books, and a set of "Collector's Market" cabinets containing collectables that are sold on a commission basis.

It also contains the "Glamour of Brighton" exhibition, whose Brighton-related models and displays include the Brighton Pavilion, Magnus Volk's electric and seashore electric railways, the old Brighton locomotive works, and the Brighton Belle Pullman train.

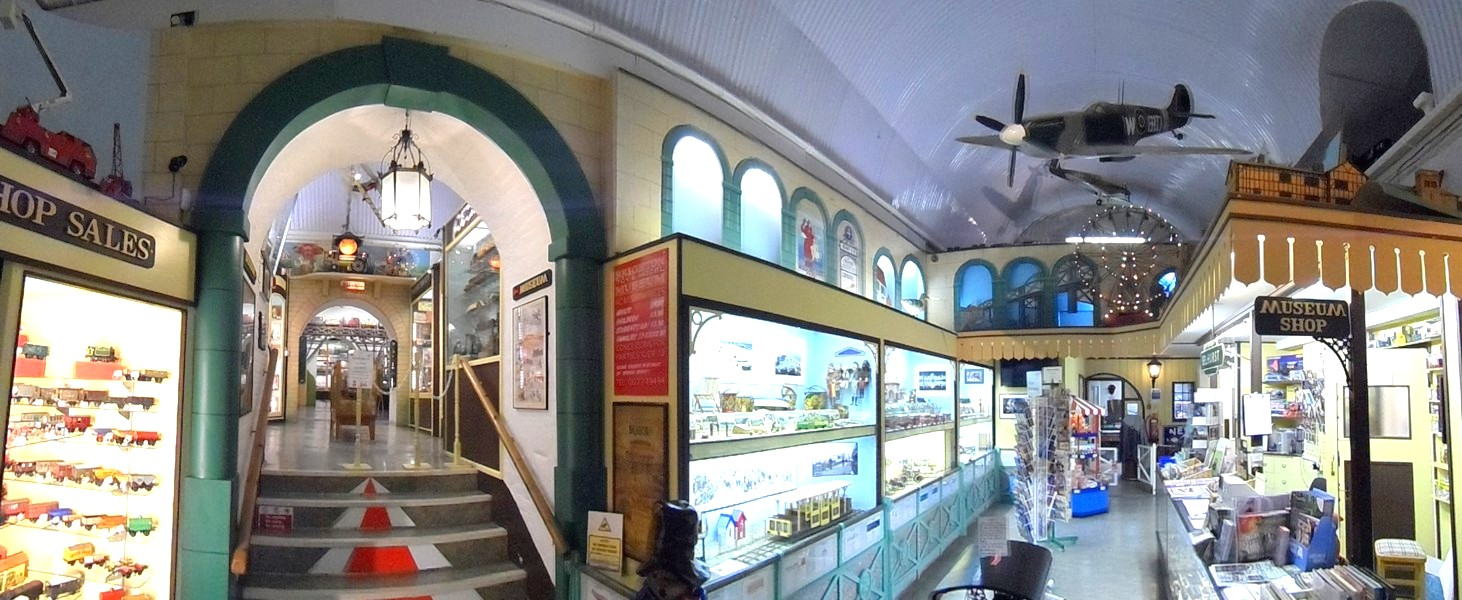
Museum entrance space, Collector's Market, shop and second-hand bookshop. Entrance to the ticketed area is on the left.

The largest exhibits in the foyer are a quarter-scale coal-fired traction engine and steamroller, a large motorised Meccano Ferris wheel, and an overhead quarter-scale radio-controlled Spitfire model aircraft.

The first arch also contains offices and construction and restoration workshops that are not open to the public.

=== Ticketed main area ===
The ticketed area of the museum fills the next three arches, and contains the three model railway layouts, and over fifty display areas.

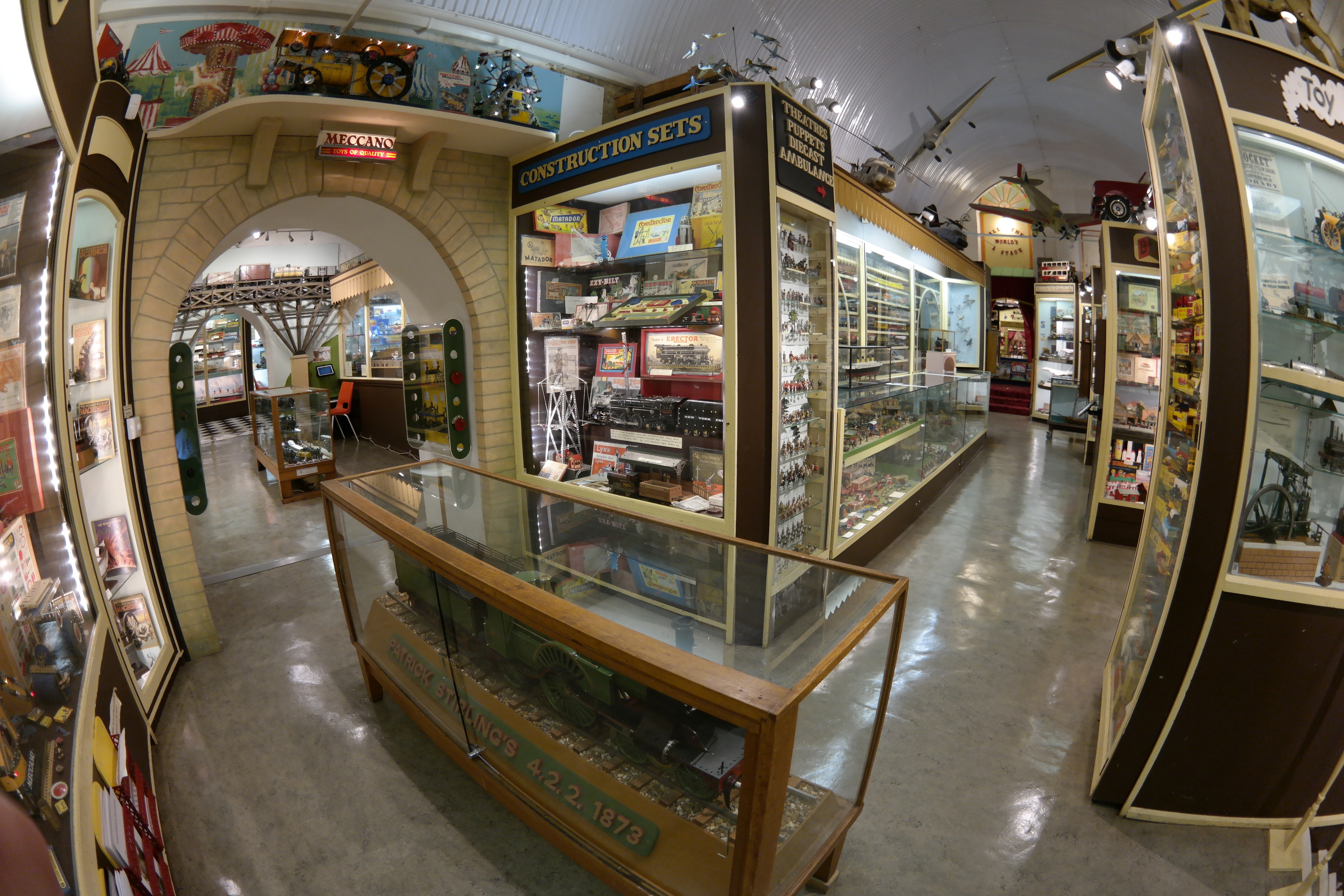
Inside the museum's ticketed area

177 Megapixel composite image of part of the Central Layout

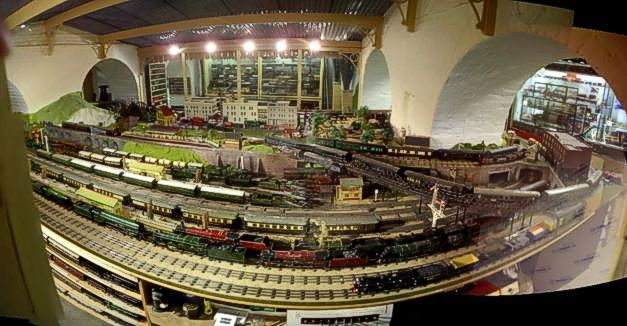
Another view of the 0-gauge layout

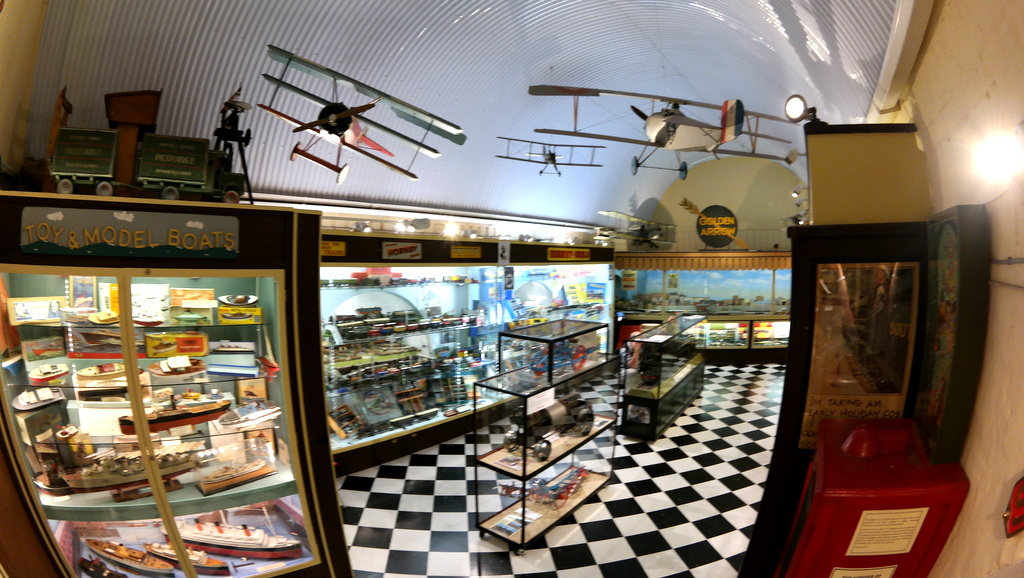
Part of the display space in Arch Four

Exhibition displays draw on outside guest collections and on varying selections taken from the Museum's core collection.

== Main display areas (as of August 2025) ==
=== Central ===
- 01 - 1930s Model Railway Layout

=== Arch Two ===
- 02 - Kamov Ka-25 helicopter (RC model)
- 03 - Toyshop Steam
- 04 - Meccano Construction Sets
- 05 - Custom Steam
- 06 - Metal Construction Sets
- 07 - Joy of Little People
- 08 - The Farm
- 09 - Biscuit Tins
- 10 - Teddybears' Picnic
- 11 - Play Kitchen
- 12 - The Dolls House
- 13 - Micromodels
- 14 - US and European Locomotive Outlines
- 15 - Animate Toy Company
- 16 - Aviation
- 17 - Toy Variety
- 18 - Tri-ang Minic Ships
- 19 - Antique and Vintage Dollhouse Miniatures
- 20 - Dollhouse Miniatures 2
- 21 - Classic Dinky Toys (John Durrant Collection)
- 22 - The Hatley Early Dinky Collection (pre-war)
- 23 - Corgi Toys (Glenn Butler Collection)
- 24 - Building Sets 2
- 25 - Lego before Lego
- 26 - Building Sets 1
- 27 - Budgie Toys
- 28 - Corgi Toys 2
- 29 - North London diecast

=== Arches Three, Four, and Three again (clockwise) ===
- 30 - Classic Locomotives
- 31 - Cast Iron Locomotive Paperweights
- 32 - Märklin Model Railways
- 33 - Dinky Army
- 34 - Soft Toys
- 35 - Toy and Model Boats
- 36 - Lead figures
- 37 - Hornby Model Railways
- 38 - "60 Years of Star Trek" (temporary)
- 39 - End Cabinet
- 40 - Newtown" model railway layout
- 41 - East Sussex Countryside model railway layout
- 42 - Hornby Controller
- 43 - 00-gauge Miscellaneous
- 44 - The Zoo
- 45 - The Circus
- 46 - Other Gauge Trains
- 47 - New Imperial Motorcycle
- 48 - Bing Table Railway
- 49 - Matchbox Series

=== Puppet Corner ===
- 51 - Childrens TV Glovepuppets
- 52 - Other Puppets
- 53 - Halloween Puppets
- 54 - Pelham Puppets Misc.
- 55 - Puppet Theatres
- 57 - Period Costume Figures
- 58 - Wooden Cutout Figures

=== Glamour of Brighton ===
- 81 - Brighton Beach
- 82 - Brighton Seafront (Magnus Volk)
- 83 - Visitors' Brighton
- 84 - London to Brighton Rally
- 85 - Brighton Locomotive Works
- 86 - Brighton Belle

== The Brighton Toy and Model Index ==
The Brighton Toy and Model Index (ISSN 2399-1798) is an online encyclopedia on toys and models manufactured up until the end of the 1960s, maintained and updated by the museum. The "Index" runs on the MediaWiki platform, and as of 2025 has nearly ten thousand content pages and over twelve thousand images.

The Index contains entries for most of the museum exhibits, and can be accessed by visitors via museum screens, or on visitors' own devices via the museum's free wifi. Entries are cross-indexed by cabinet number, and cabinet entries can also be triggered by QR code.

== Events and temporary exhibitions ==
The museum is a regular annual venue for the Brighton Fringe, and has also hosted events for the Brighton Science Festival, Sofar Sounds, and the Toy Museum Folk Club (Folkroom Records). Artists using the site as a (small) music venue have included Ayanna Witter-Johnson (13 April 2019).

Public Train Running Days are typically held twice a year (Spring and Autumn), .

Temporary exhibitions for 2025 address Paddington Bear, and the Lehmann Gross Bahn ("LGB") garden railway system.

== Non-public resources ==
As well as a carpentry workshop that produces the museum's cabinetry and displays, the museum also has an in-house toy repair and restoration workshop, with tinsmithing tools and its own sample library of parts and reference paint finishes. The reference library is the centre of most of the historical research that takes place in the museum, and a source of material for the museum's online knowledgebase.

== Partnerships ==
The museum became the first community rail partner to Brighton Station in March 2013, and also announced a twinning with the Rahmi M. Koç Museum, Istanbul the same year.

== Projects ==
=== Trafalgar Street Regeneration Project (fundraising stage) ===
The project aims to improve the museum's exterior wall and the station bridge underside with new lighting and signage, and by removing modern brick infill and replacing it with ornamental glasswork more similar to the appearance of the arches in the 1920s/1930s. Work on one arch (the museum entrance) is currently scheduled for late 2025.

=== "Toys in the Community" oral history project (2014–16) ===
A 2014 grant from the Heritage Lottery Fund supported "Toys in the Community: Valuing memories of dolls, teddy bears and construction toys", a two-year community outreach and oral history project.

=== Frank Hornby 150th anniversary project (2012–2013) ===
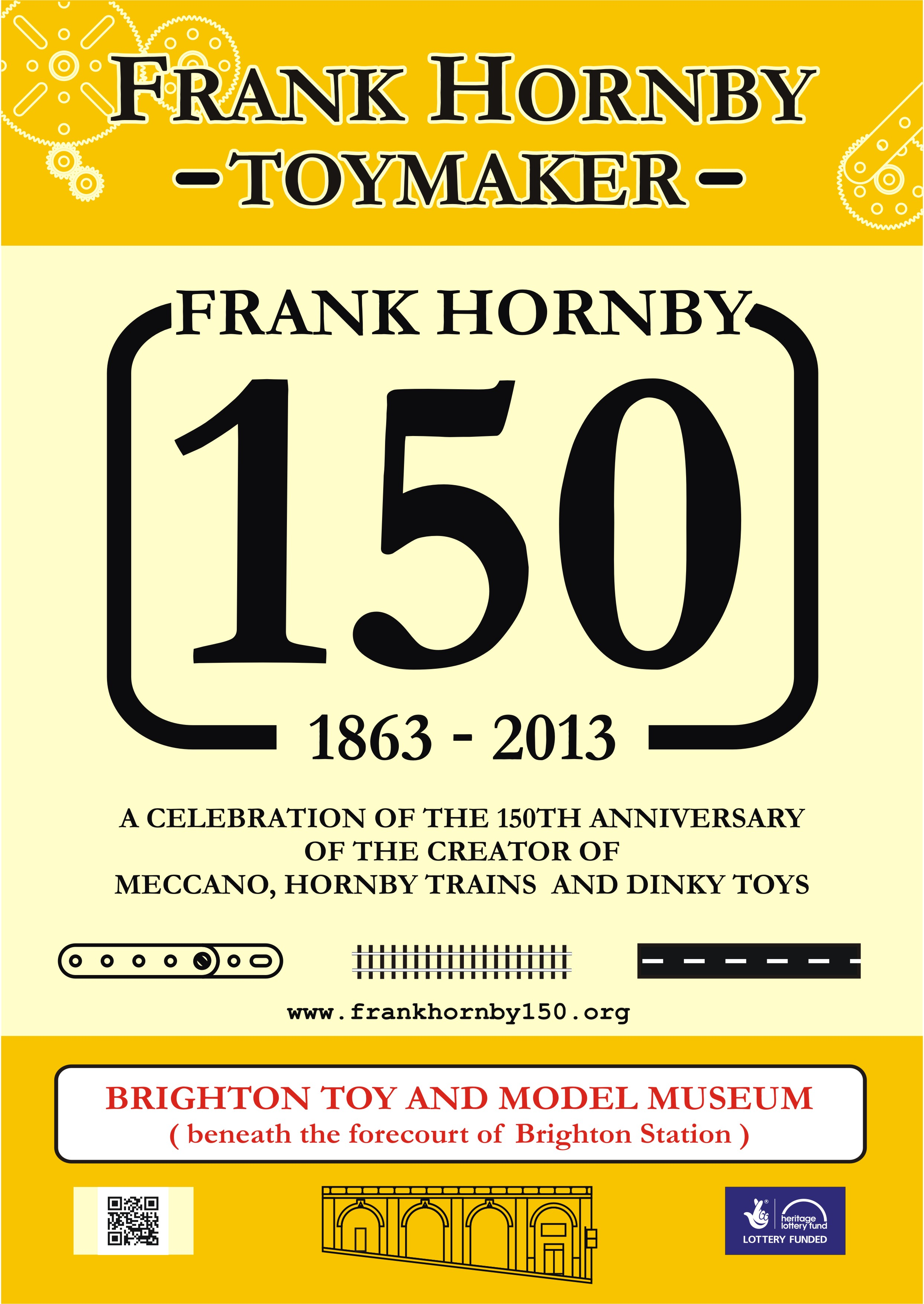
Poster, Frank Hornby 150th Anniversary celebrations (2013)

A 2012 grant from the Heritage Lottery Fund helped the museum to coordinate, publicise and organise celebrations and events during 2013 to mark the 150th anniversary of the birth of Frank Hornby.

The grant funded an expansion of the Museum's online coverage of Meccano, Hornby trains and Dinky Toys, a public wifi access point, and the installation and ongoing development of a touchscreen information system to allow members of the public to retrieve information on exhibits from around the museum.

=== The Brighton Belle Mural (2010) ===
The planned return of the Art Deco Brighton Belle all-electric Pullman train was celebrated on 23 September 2010 with a street party and the unveiling of a full-sized mural of a Pullman carriage by the Chairman of the 'Railway Heritage Trust and Museum Patron Sir William McAlpine. Inside the museum, the "Glamour of Brighton" exhibition was opened by the Mayor of Brighton and Hove, Councillor Geoffrey Wells. The mural extends for the full length of the museum, and includes regular passenger Laurence Olivier at one of the carriage windows.

=== Make History Fun (2005-2006) ===
A series of events starting in October 2005, with Tony Robinson the campaign's patron. Tony Robinson's visit to the museum on 1 June 2007 achieved extensive BBC News coverage.

== Television appearances ==
=== online clips ===
- BBC1 clip: "Christina has a guided tour of Brighton Toy Museum"
- ITV News clip: Mechanics Made Easy items on display: fundraising to renovate entrance.

=== programmes ===
- Quest: Salvage Hunters Series 17 Episode 7 – Rebecca Pritchard talks to Chris Littledale about Meccano – 2023
- BBC2: Celebrity Antiques Road Trip - Series 11 Episode 9 – A visit to the museum by Francis Rossi. – Thu 8 Dec 2022
- BBC1: Bargain Hunt Series 56 Lewes 19 – Chris Littledale gives Christina Trevanion a guided tour. – Fri 26 Jun 2020
- BBC4: Timeshift Series 4 episode 7: The Joy of (Train) Sets – commentators include Chris Littledale and Pete Waterman Wed 23 Jan 2013
- Sky Atlantic: Urban Secrets Episode 2: Brighton – Alan Cumming presents an unconventional view of Brighton. – 2012

== Sources ==
- "Toy Museum Has A Brighter Outlook" from the Argus archives, first published Saturday 29 September 2001. Retrieved 23 November 2007.
- "Happy Ending For Toy Story" from the Argus archives, first published Friday 5 November 2001. Retrieved 23 November 2007.
- "A Feast Of Mini-Gigs" from the Argus archives, first published Tuesday 22 May 2007. Retrieved 23 November 2007.
- "Museum Background" from the Brighton Toy and Model Museum website. Retrieved 23 November 2007.
- "Photogrammetry at Brighton Toy and Model Museum" (August 2019) DOI: 10.13140/RG.2.2.32030.89920
- "The C60 "Buckyball" structure, published in Meccano Magazine, 1928" (April 2025) DOI: 10.13140/RG.2.2.13057.57440
