= Marine railway (disambiguation) =

Marine railway may refer to:

- Patent slip, a ship handling device also known as a marine railway
- The Long Beach Marine Railway, a former railroad company in New York, US
- The Brighton and Rottingdean Seashore Electric Railway, a former offshore railroad in Brighton, England
- A canal inclined plane: a cable railway used on inland waterways to move boats between two levels of water
