= NND =

NND or nnd may refer to:

- Net News Daily, a British news website
- Nürnberg-Dutzendteich station (DS100 code: NND), a railway station in Nuremberg, Bavaria, Germany
- West Ambae language (ISO 639-3: nnd), an Oceanic language spoken on Ambae, Vanuatu
- Niconico Douga, a Japanese video sharing service
