= Scott Campbell (journalist) =

Scottish journalist (born 1995)

- Born: August 1995 (age 30–31); Aberdeen, Scotland
- Education: City, University of London
- Occupation: Journalist
- Years active: 2009–present

Scott Campbell (born August 1995) is a Scottish journalist and communications consultant. He founded the news website Net News Daily at the age of 13 before going on to launch a Scottish spin-off version, and as a teenager subsequently worked for newspapers including The Daily Telegraph, the Daily Mail and the Daily Express.

He is currently the editor-in-chief of Middle East Traveller, a website focusing on the Arab market in Gulf Cooperation Council countries such as the United Arab Emirates, Saudi Arabia and Bahrain.

Campbell was also a press photographer for Getty Images and the Associated Press.

He is a descendant of the pioneering British-German electrical engineer and inventor Magnus Volk.

== Career ==
Campbell began his journalism career at the age of 13, writing for BBC News about the anniversary of the Sony Walkman from a teenager's perspective. The article was covered extensively around the world, including in Wired magazine, CNET and NPR, where Campbell gave an interview to host Scott Simon about his experiences.

At the time of the BBC piece, Campbell was "doing pieces here and there" as an intern for TechCrunch after emailing the website to ask if he could write for them.
