= Anthony Reckenzaun =

Austrian electrical engineer (1850–1893)

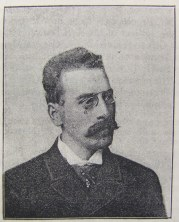
Anthony Reckenzaun (1850–1893)

Anthony Reckenzaun (23 March 1850 – 11 November 1893) was an electrical engineer who worked in the UK and the United States.

Reckenzaun worked on electric tramcars and electric boats. He is probably best known for applying worm gear drive to tramcars. This was not a great success on full-size vehicles but was later very widely used on electrically powered model railway locomotives.

== Early life and education ==
Born in Graz, Austrian Empire on 23 March 1850, and died of consumption at his home in Stockwell, London at 2 a.m. on 11 November 1893. He was 43 years old.

At an early age he had first-hand opportunities of practical engineering, seeing the operations in the ironworks of his father who carried out large contracts for brewery plants, tanneries, buildings and railway materials - especially for the Hungarian railways. After receiving a practical education at the Technical School in Graz, and with a view to widening his engineering knowledge, he moved to England in 1872.

== Life and work in England ==
He was first employed by Messrs Ravenhill, Miller & Co, the noted steam engine manufacturers and marine engineers of London. When John Richard Ravenhill left the partnership in 1875, the business transferred to the works of his former co-partners, Messrs Easton and Anderson of Erith, Kent - engineers, millwrights, and lead pipe manufacturers, and Reckenzaun followed the firm.

In connection with the Erith ironworks, Reckenzaun established evening classes for the workmen, lecturing in machine construction and drawing, and steam. First, however, he had to qualify himself under the rules of the South Kensington Science and Art Department in these subjects, which he took with first class honours. Afterwards he attended the course of lectures given to qualified science teachers at the Royal School of Mines in 1877 and 1879. Again he obtained first class passes in steam and mechanics.

== Electrical engineering work ==
After visiting the Paris Exposition of 1878, he determined to pursue a career in electrical engineering and attended Professor William Edward Ayrton's lectures at Finsbury Technical College which later became the City and Guilds. At the time of his death he was vice-president of the Old Students' Association of that body.

He returned to Paris for the 1881 exhibition, studying the electrical exhibits at the Palais d'Industrie over three months. When he returned to England, he briefly joined the Faure Electric Accumulator Company before accepting the post of engineer to the Electrical Power Storage Company.

In connection with the E.P.S. company he undertook much original and pioneering work on various forms of electric traction. In 1882 he designed the first significant electric launch driven by storage batteries, named Electricity. Soon afterwards he was building an electric tramcar which was exhibited in March 1883 on the West Metropolitan Tramways Company's line in London.

From 1884 onwards Reckenzaun continued his electrical work independently, to build boats, cars and electric motors for various purposes. He conducted numerous investigations into electric traction and patented improvements in secondary batteries, electric motors, electric meters and related devices. He was an early electric motor designer and, paid particular attention to bogie cars and worm gear in this connection. This was not a great success on full-size vehicles but was later very widely used on electrically powered model railway locomotives.

His storage battery tramcars were tried out on a number of tramlines, in the U.K. but mainly in the US, where his inventions were assigned to the Electric Car Company of America and his brother Frederick Reckenzaun, based in New York City developed associated electrical businesses and was his representative there.

His traction motors were applied to the first large scale telpherage system for the Sussex Portland Cement Company at Glynde in 1885. The telpherage system, had originally been tested on the estate of Mr Marlborough.R. Pryor at Weston, Hertfordshire and also a line in Peru by Professor Fleeming Jenkin in association with Professors William Edward Ayrton and John Perry and the Telpherage Company, Limited.

Perhaps one of his most noteworthy developments came in electric launches. On 13 September 1886 the boat Volta made the double voyage from Dover to Calais and back. He also built perhaps the first significant electric boat in the United States, named Magnet.

== Professional and scientific societies ==
He was a member of, and contributor of papers to, various professional and scientific bodies, both English and International. In 1882 he was elected a member of the Society of Arts. On 16 January 1884 he read a paper before that society on 'Electric Launches'. On 20 April 1887 he gave a paper on 'Electric Locomotion'. For this latter paper he received the society's silver medal.

On 1 November 1887 he was elected an Associate Member, and on 6 December the same year, a Full Member of the American Institute of Electrical Engineers

In 1889 he was elected to the Society of Telegraph-Engineers and Electricians now the Institution of Engineering and Technology. In December 1892 the I.E.E. awarded him the Paris Electrical Exhibition Premium for his paper on 'Load diagrams and the cost of electric traction'.

He also gave papers at the British Association, the American National Electric Light Association and the Vienna Electro-Technical Society.

In later years he associated himself with the General Electric Company and Greenwood and Batley and was a regular contributor to the electrical journals of the day. He published a collection of much of his work on electric traction was published in 1892 by Biggs & Co, London, entitled 'Electric traction on railways and tramways'.

== Miscellaneous ==
He was a friend of the noted British inventors Magnus Volk and Moritz Immisch.
