= Volk's Electric Railway =

Narrow gauge heritage railway in Brighton, England

Coordinates: 50°49′06″N 0°07′45″W

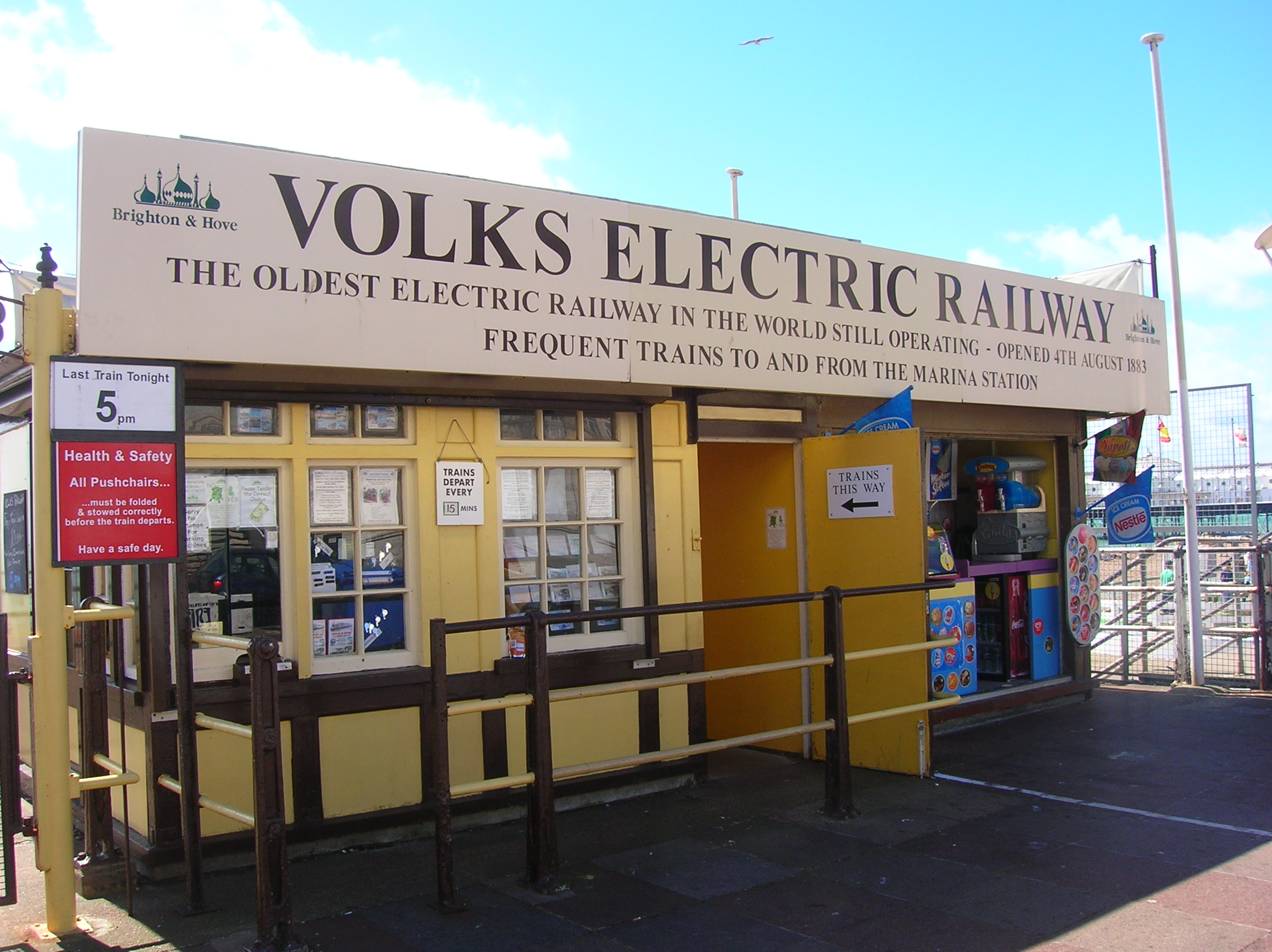
- The old Aquarium station (subsequently rebuilt)

Overview
- Owner: City of Brighton and Hove
- Locale: Brighton, East Sussex, United Kingdom

Service
- Operator(s): City of Brighton and Hove

History
- Opened: 3 August 1883

Technical
- Line length: 1.02 miles (1.64 km) after line shortened in 1990
- Track gauge: 2 ft 8 1/2 in (825 mm)
- Old gauge: 2 ft (610 mm) (1883–1884)
- Electrification: 110 V DC by inside off-set third rail

Volk's Electric Railway (VER) is a narrow gauge heritage railway that runs along a length of the seafront of the English seaside resort of Brighton. It was built by Magnus Volk, the first section being completed in August 1883, and is the oldest operational electric railway in the world, though it was not the first electric railway to be built. It was preceded by electrification of Miller's line in 1875, Werner von Siemens' 1879 demonstration line in Berlin and by the Gross-Lichterfelde Tramway of 1881, although none of these remain in operation.

Operated as an historical seafront tourist attraction, the railway does not usually run during the winter months, and its service is also liable to occasional suspension due to severe weather or maintenance issues.

== History ==
=== Volk family ===
On 3 August 1883, Magnus Volk opened a 2 ft (610 mm) electric railway running for 1/4 mile (402 m) between Swimming Arch (opposite the main entrance to Brighton Aquarium, and adjacent to the site of the future Palace Pier) and Chain Pier. Electrical power at 50 V DC was supplied to the small car using the two running rails. On 4 April 1884, the line was extended a further 1/2 mile (0.8 km) beyond the Chain Pier to Paston Place (now known as Halfway), and regauged to 2 ft 8 1/2 in (825 mm). The electrical supply was increased to 160 V DC and the power plant was installed in the arch built into the cliff face at Paston Place. In 1886 an off-set third rail was added to minimise current leakage.

In 1896, the Brighton and Rottingdean Seashore Electric Railway was built by Volk. Owing to problems concerning the construction of lengthened groynes to the east of Paston Place this closed in 1901, although it was not finally dismantled until 1910. Following the closure Volk's original electric railway was extended from Paston Place (today's Halfway) to Black Rock on 21 February 1901. Paston Place was also the home of Volk's Seaplane Station, which was used by Volk's son George Herbert Volk. In 1930, the line was cut back 200 yards (183 m) from Palace Pier to its present terminus, still known as Aquarium. In 1935 a lido was built at Black Rock, and the line was shortened by around 200 yards (183 m) to accommodate it. In 1937, a new Black Rock station was opened at the end of the shortened line.

=== Brighton Corporation ===
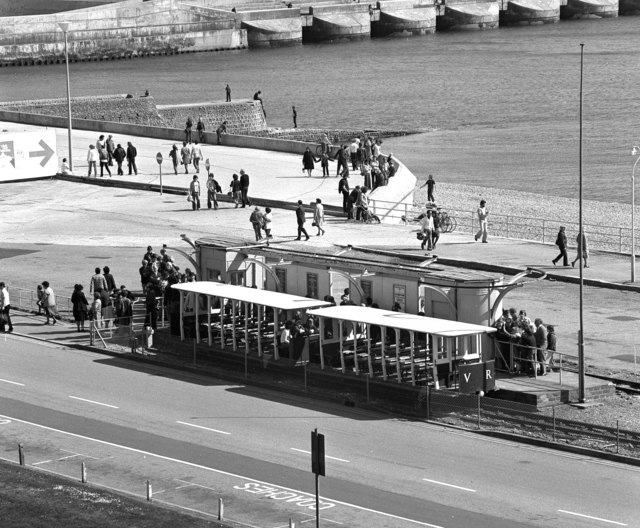
Black Rock terminus in 1980

In April 1940, Brighton Corporation took control of the line. On 2 July 1940, World War II defensive preparations resulted in the line closing. After the war, starting in 1947, the corporation rebuilt the line using 50 lb/yd (24.80 kg/m) rail for the running line and 25 lb/yd (12.40 kg/m) mounted on insulators for the third rail. At Black Rock, a new station was built to replace the 1937 building which had suffered badly during the war. The line reopened for passengers in 1948.

Winter operation ceased from 1954, although the line did reopen temporarily in the winter of 1980 to cash in on the large numbers of sightseers who had come to look at the Athina B, a freighter that had beached near the Palace Pier. Two-car multiple operation was introduced in 1964. In 1995 the Volk's Electric Railway Association was formed to help Brighton & Hove City Council promote and operate the line. In 2003 the Volk's Railway Institute of Science and Technology was formed to promote the educational and science side of the Victorian railway to schools and special interest groups.

In the late 1990s, the Black Rock end of the line was shortened by 211 feet to permit a storm water storage scheme to be built in the marina area. The 1948 station was demolished and replaced by a new single platform station, which opened in 1998 and shares a building with a new Southern Water pumping station.

=== Lottery funding ===
In 2014, it was announced that the railway had been awarded a grant of £1.6 million by the Heritage Lottery Fund, a sum which had to be spent by March 2017. The work funded included: the provision of a new visitor centre and ticket office at the Aquarium station; a new five-road depot (four stock roads and one through running line) with engineering facilities, inspection pit, and public viewing gallery at Halfway; the restoration of cars 4, 6, and 10 from a semi-derelict state to full working order; and the provision of new educational materials about the railway.

== Route ==
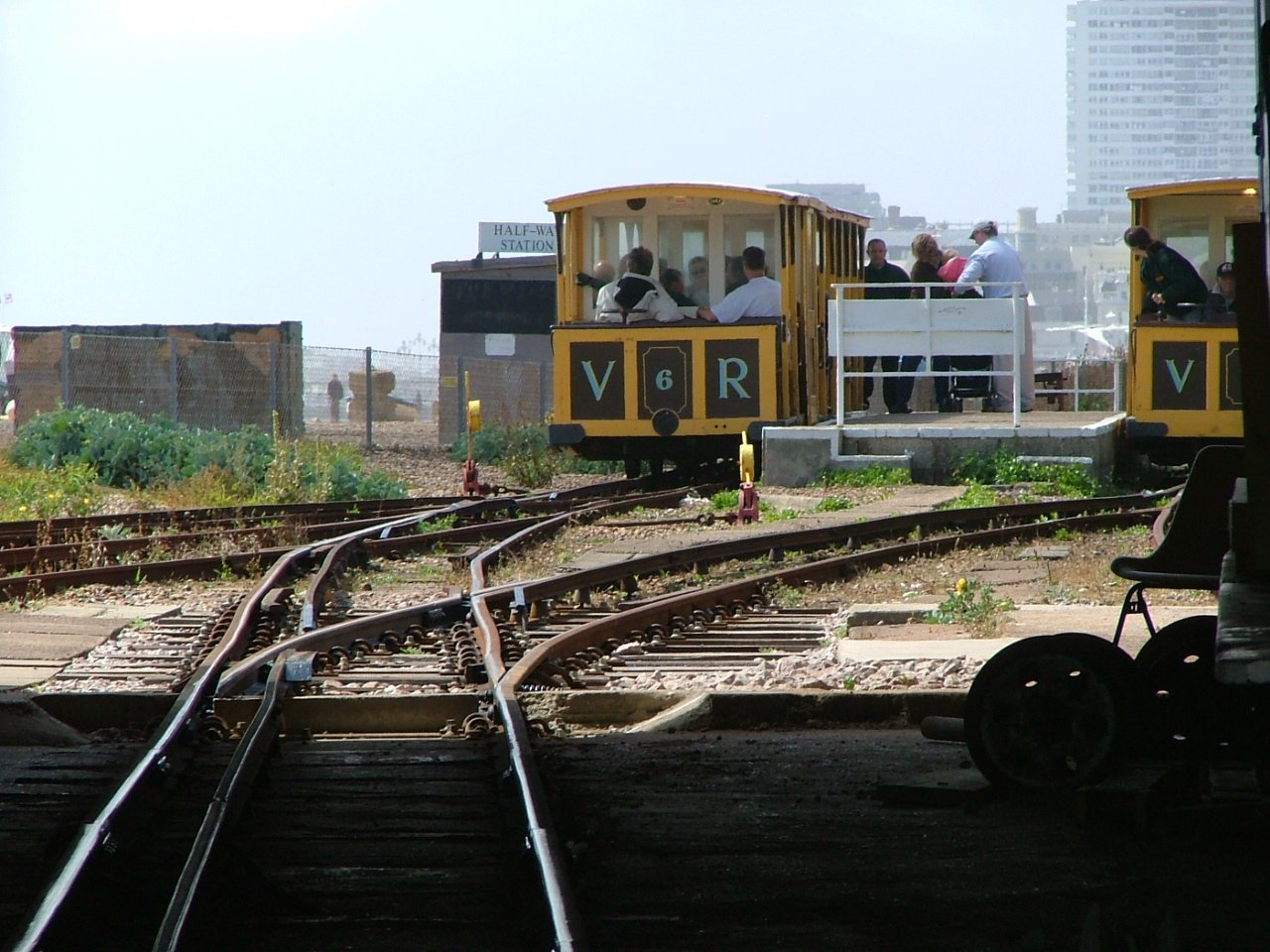
Halfway station

=== Overview ===
Today the line runs between terminal stations at Aquarium (a short distance from the Palace Pier) and Black Rock (at Black Rock, not far from Brighton Marina), with an intermediate station and depot at Halfway.

The line has a 2 ft 8 1/2 in (825 mm) narrow gauge, is electrified at 110 V DC using a third rail, and is one mile (1.6 km) long.

There are no branch lines, although there was originally a branch at Paston Place (now Halfway), with a line running across Madeira Drive and into the railway's workshops, which were located (with Magnus Volk's office) inside the cliff on the landward side of the road.

=== Stations ===
Palace Pier was the original terminus of 1883 in the centre of Brighton. Named Aquarium at the original opening, it was renamed Palace Pier in 1899 when the pier of that name was opened to the public. The station was closed in 1930 when the western end of the railway was shortened to allow the widening of Madeira Drive.

Aquarium station opened in 1930, as the new western terminus of the line following its shortening. As the new station was closer to the old Brighton Aquarium than the Palace Pier, the new station revived the old Aquarium name. It remains the western terminus. Originally provided with two platforms, one was closed in the 1960s, and the tracks were later taken up, leaving today's station as single-platform. The station was completely rebuilt in 2016-2017 and now has toilets, a cafeteria, staff rooms, a ticket office, and an exhibition centre.

Halfway station is located in the middle of the railway, and has previously been known as Paston Place, Children's Playground, and Peter Pan's Playground. The original station opened in 1884 when the line was extended, and was both the eastern terminus and the depot. Volk also built his own offices at this location, inland from the station. The original station was located on the same site as the depot, and remained there until the station remodelling just after the second world war, when the new station platforms and passenger shelters were constructed about 50 yards (46 metres) further west than the original site. The station has two platform faces, on a single central island platform, in the centre of a passing loop. There is a public viewing gallery in the neighbouring railway depot and workshop.

Black Rock station opened in 1901 when the railway was extended eastwards. The original station, with two platforms, a ticket office, and a waiting room, was situated in an isolated location. Subsequently, a corporation swimming pool gave further purpose to the location, and today it is close to the thriving Brighton Marina. The original station was replaced in 1911 with a much larger bungalow-style building. This was in turn closed and demolished in the winter of 1936-1937 when the line was shortened to allow for the construction of the Black Rock swimming pool. The new Black Rock station opened in May 1937, still with two platforms. The station building was again rebuilt in 1948 in Art Deco style, still with two platforms, although from the mid-1960s the south platform was abandoned. In the 1980s the second (south) platform was restored and used for special school visits trains, operating around the timetabled service. This was short-lived, and in 1989 the south platform track was lifted. The station was briefly renamed Marina Station in the early 1990s, but was in turn demolished in the mid-1990s during a storm drain project, with a new station building opened in 1998. This new station, which reverted to the original Black Rock name, was provided with only one platform (plus ticket office and toilets), and remains in current use.

No other stations are in current use, although there have been halts associated with intermediate passing loops. Former intermediate passing loop halts have been known as Sussex Square (or Lift), and Kemp Town. There was also a temporary Black Rock station constructed, with platform and booking office, during the storm drain project of the mid-1990s.

== Signalling ==
The line is single throughout, with three passing loops - one at Halfway station and two others roughly midway between each terminal station and Halfway. The passing loops are equipped with spring loaded turnouts. These are set so that trains entering a loop are routed to the left track. Trains can exit the loop by pushing the switch blade to the appropriate position. In normal service two trains operate from end to end, passing at Halfway station, and there is generally only one train on each single track section at any one time. This is sufficient to provide a 15-minute interval service. Drivers are now equipped with radios which allow communication between each other, stations and control.

Nevertheless, the line is operated using single track tokens. There are four colour coded tokens, one each for the sections between Aquarium and the first passing loop (red token), the passing loop and Halfway (yellow token), Halfway to the next passing loop (blue token), and the passing loop to Black Rock (white token). In practice, the two pairs of tokens (for the two sections west of Halfway, and for the two sections east of Halfway) are permanently combined into a single dual token, marked with two colours, as full operation of the line as four block sections is very rare. Due to the low line speed, multiple trains are able to operate in each section, but the token must be carried on the train furthest from Halfway.

There are warning lights at pedestrian crossing points to the beach with a warbling siren to warn of the approach of a train. A following train is required to signal its approach to a pedestrian crossing point by sounding its klaxon horn. One such crossing provides the only external access to Halfway station.

== Rolling stock ==
The numbering of cars can cause some confusion as numbers were duplicated when new cars replaced scrapped vehicles. In 1948, cars Nos. 8, 9 and 10 were renumbered 5, 2 and 1 respectively after the cars bearing those numbers were scrapped. All cars reverted to their original numbers in the year 2000. The cars were often built in pairs. Currently, there are seven electric cars and one diesel locomotive in operation on the line with an additional two electric cars on static display elsewhere.

Number	Type	Builder	Date	Motor	Status	Notes	Image
1 (1st)	10 seater	William Pollard	1883	Unknown	Scrapped	Original 2 ft (610 mm) gauge demonstration car. Could not be re-gauged when the line was converted, and was scrapped in 1884.	
1 (2nd)	30 seat saloon	Unknown	1884	Siemens D2; 6 hp (4.5 kW)	Scrapped	Suffered badly from wartime storage. Scrapped June 1948.	
2	30 seat saloon	Unknown	1885	Siemens D2; 6 hp (4.5 kW)	Scrapped	Suffered badly from wartime storage. Scrapped June 1948.	
3	40 seat semi-open	VER/Paston Place Works	1892	Greenwood & Batley; 7 hp (5.2 kW) replaced by Compagnie Electrique Belge; 8 hp (6.0 kW)	Rebuild in progress	New underframe around 1923. Restoration is being planned by the volunteers of the Volk's Electric Railway Association.	
4	40 seat semi-open	VER/Paston Place Works	1892	Greenwood & Batley; 7 hp (5.2 kW) replaced by Compagnie Electrique Belge; 8 hp (6.0 kW)	Operational	New underframe around 1923. Restored to working order 2016-2018 through Heritage Lottery funding.	
5 (1st)	30 seat saloon	VER/Paston Place Works	1896	Siemens; 8 hp (6.0 kW)	Scrapped	Scrapped in the late 1920s. Fate unknown.	
5 (2nd)	24 seater winter Car	G.Kelsey, Hove	1930	Siemens; 8 hp (6.0 kW)	Scrapped	Unique all steel enclosed car for use in bad weather. Suffered badly from wartime storage and body became heavily corroded. Scrapped c.1946.	
6	40 seat semi-open	VER/Paston Place Works	1901	Compagnie Electrique Belge; 8 hp (6.0 kW)	Operational	Restored to working order 2016-2018 through Heritage Lottery funding.	
7	40 seat semi-open	VER/Paston Place Works	1901	Compagnie Electrique Belge; 8 hp (6.0 kW)	Operational	Cars 7 & 8 were the first to be designed with side entrance doors.	
8 (1st)	40 seat semi-open	VER/Paston Place Works	1901	Compagnie Electrique Belge; 8 hp (6.0 kW)	Operational	Carried no.5 between 1948 and 2000.	
8 (2nd)	Southend Pier 40 seat open	Falcon Works, Loughborough	1898 (Into VER service 1950)	Two 140 Volt motors.	No longer on the railway	Purchased from Southend Pier Railway around 1948. Operated on VER until the 1990s when it was decided to retire the aged Southend cars. Static display at Southend Pier Museum.	
9 (1st)	40 seat open	VER/Paston Place Works	1910	Compagnie Electrique Belge; 8 hp (6.0 kW)	Operational	Carried no.2 between 1948 and 2000.	
9 (2nd)	Southend Pier 40 seat open	Falcon Works, Loughborough	1898 (Into VER service 1953)	Two 60 volt milk-float motors.	No longer on the railway	Purchased from Southend Pier Railway around 1948. Operated on VER until the 1990s when it was decided to retire the aged Southend cars. Static display at South Downs Heritage Centre, Hassocks.	
10	40 seat open	VER/Paston Place Works	1926	Compagnie Electrique Belge; 8 hp (6.0 kW)	Operational	Carried no.1 between 1948 and 2000. Restored to working order 2016-2018 through Heritage Lottery funding.	
PW	Diesel works locomotive	Motor Rail (Alan Keef Ltd.) (40SD530)	1988 (Into VER service 2004)	Perkins diesel engine.	Operational.	Last ever locomotive to be ordered from Motor Rail though actually constructed by Alan Keef Ltd. Built for Butterley Brick Co. Ltd. and operated at Star Lane Brickworks. Passed back to Alan Keef Ltd. after closure of the brickworks, overhauled, and purchased by VER in 2004. First non-electric powered vehicle on VER. Used for maintenance and inspection at times when power rail is switched off.	

The railway also has a few service wagons that are used with the diesel locomotive.

A highly detailed model of Volks car 6 is on show in the foyer of the Brighton Toy and Model Museum, donated by Siemens which provided much of the electrical equipment used on the railway.

== Volk's Electric Railway Association (VERA) ==
At the invitation of the council and the management of the railway, a supporters' group, The Volk's Electric Railway Association, was formed in 1995. Members provide practical and promotional help to the railway, including operation and maintenance tasks. The association also attends various exhibitions with a large operating model of the railway as it was in the 1950s. Membership is open to all with an interest in the railway. Members receive a quarterly magazine, reduced rate travel on the railway and free admission to a series of winter meetings held in Brighton. The association also acts as a collector for Volk's memorabilia and ephemera, some of which can be seen at the South Downs Heritage Centre in Hassocks. The largest artefact now in the care of the association is the ex-Southend car which, between 1950 and 2000, carried the Volk's fleet number 9. Plans were drawn up to restore car 3 as a two-year joint project.

== Bibliography ==
- Iain D.O. Frew, ed. (1984). Britain's Electric Railways Today. Electric Railway Society and Southern Electric Group. pp. 81–82. ISBN 978-0855340216.
- Jackson, Alan A. (1993). Volk's Railways, Brighton: An Illustrated History. Plateway Press. ISBN 978-1871980189.
- Smith, Derek (2010). Volks Electric Railway: A pictorial history. Chrisdel Books.
- Volk, Magnus (1972). Volk's electric railway, and how it is worked: particulars of the Brighton Electric Railway. ISBN 978-0900433467.
