= Black Rock (Brighton and Hove) =

Area near Brighton Marina, East Sussex, England

Coordinates: 50°48′53″N 0°06′02″W

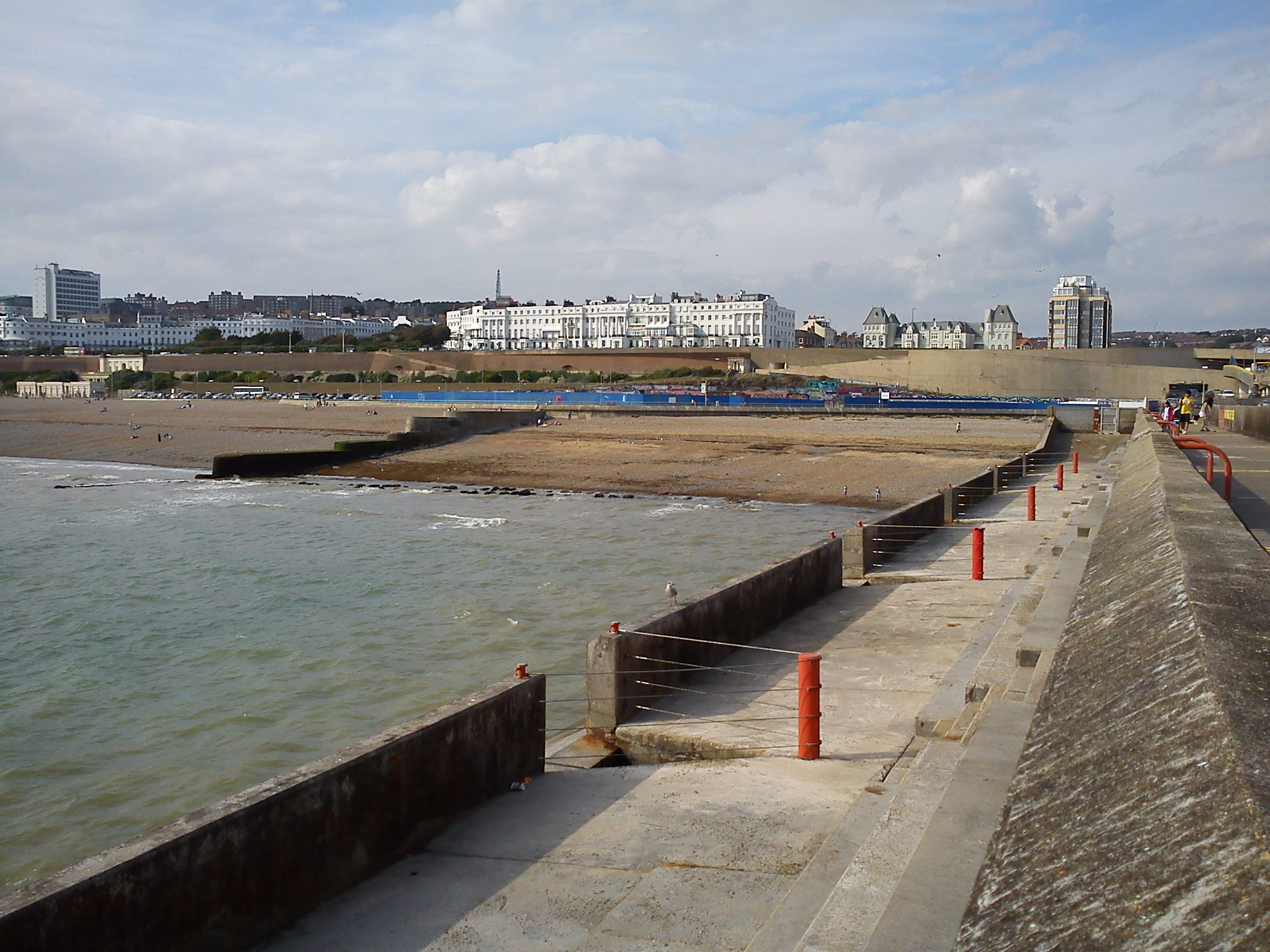
Black Rock from Brighton Marina sea wall.

Black Rock is an area of beach and promenade located to the west of Brighton Marina and south of Sussex Square in Kemptown in the city of Brighton and Hove. It is one of the terminus stations of the Volk's railway, hosts a 200-year-old living wall, designated as a local wildlife site and including ninety plants such as Euonymus japonicus, and has area of vegetated shingle on the beach, recreated using plants such as Crambe maritima (sea kale), Glaucium flavum (yellow-horned poppy) and Solanum dulcamara (bittersweet) under the guidance of horticulturalists at Kew’s Millennium Seed Bank.

== History ==
It is not known where origin of the name Black Rock arose, but it has been suggested that the name derives from black coal stains on the beach and white chalk cliffs. Apparently, when Brighton Council introduced charges for landing coal on the beaches within their remit, colliers (vessels carrying coal) landed the "black rock" on the beach just outside their boundary, at Black Rock.

From at least the early 19th century, Black Rock was the site of an inn and a few houses overlooking cliffs to the east of the then town of Brighton.

In 1922, Ralph Seymour, signal officer for Admiral David Beatty during WWI, committed suicide at Black Rock by jumping into the sea.

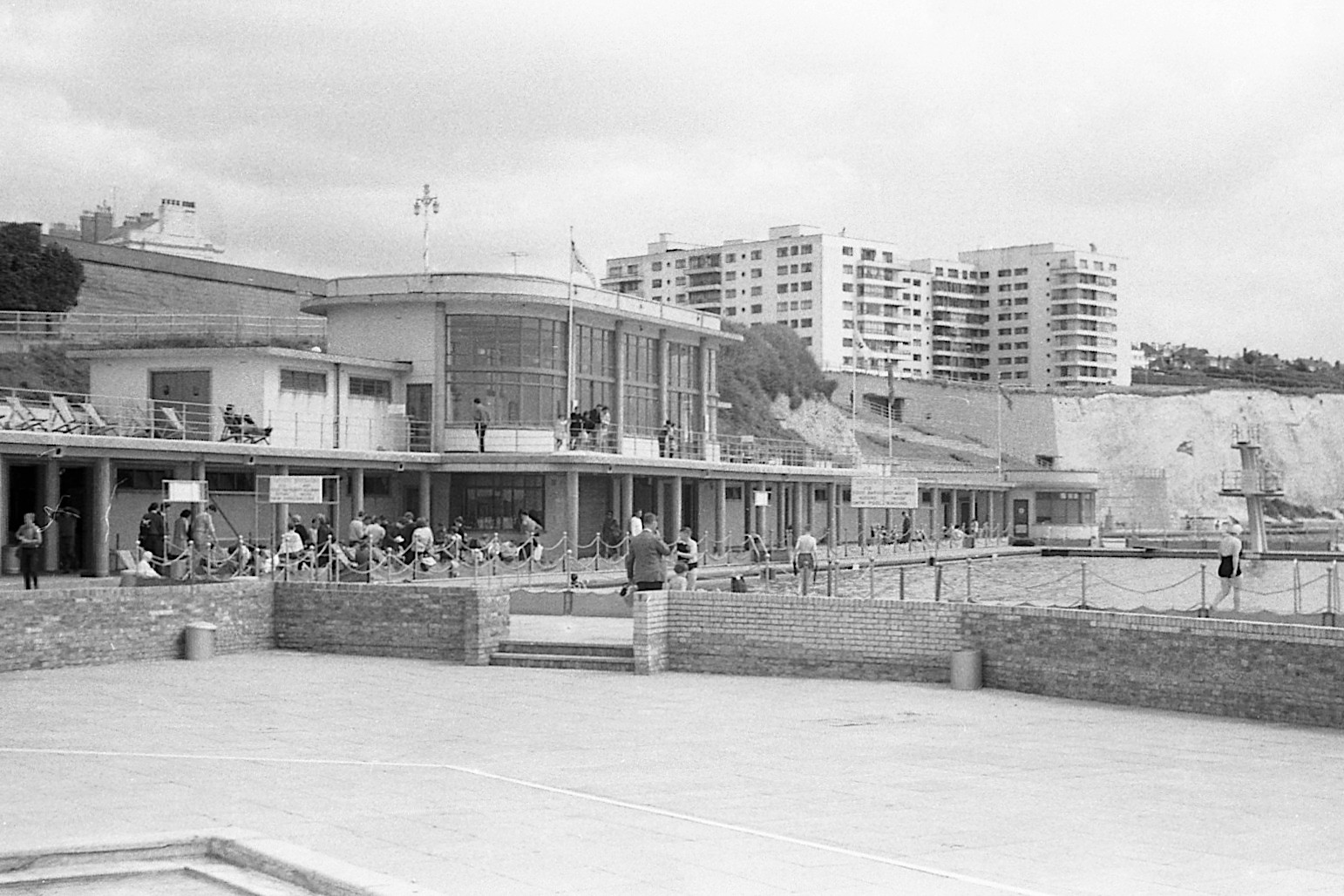
Black Rock Pool, 1961

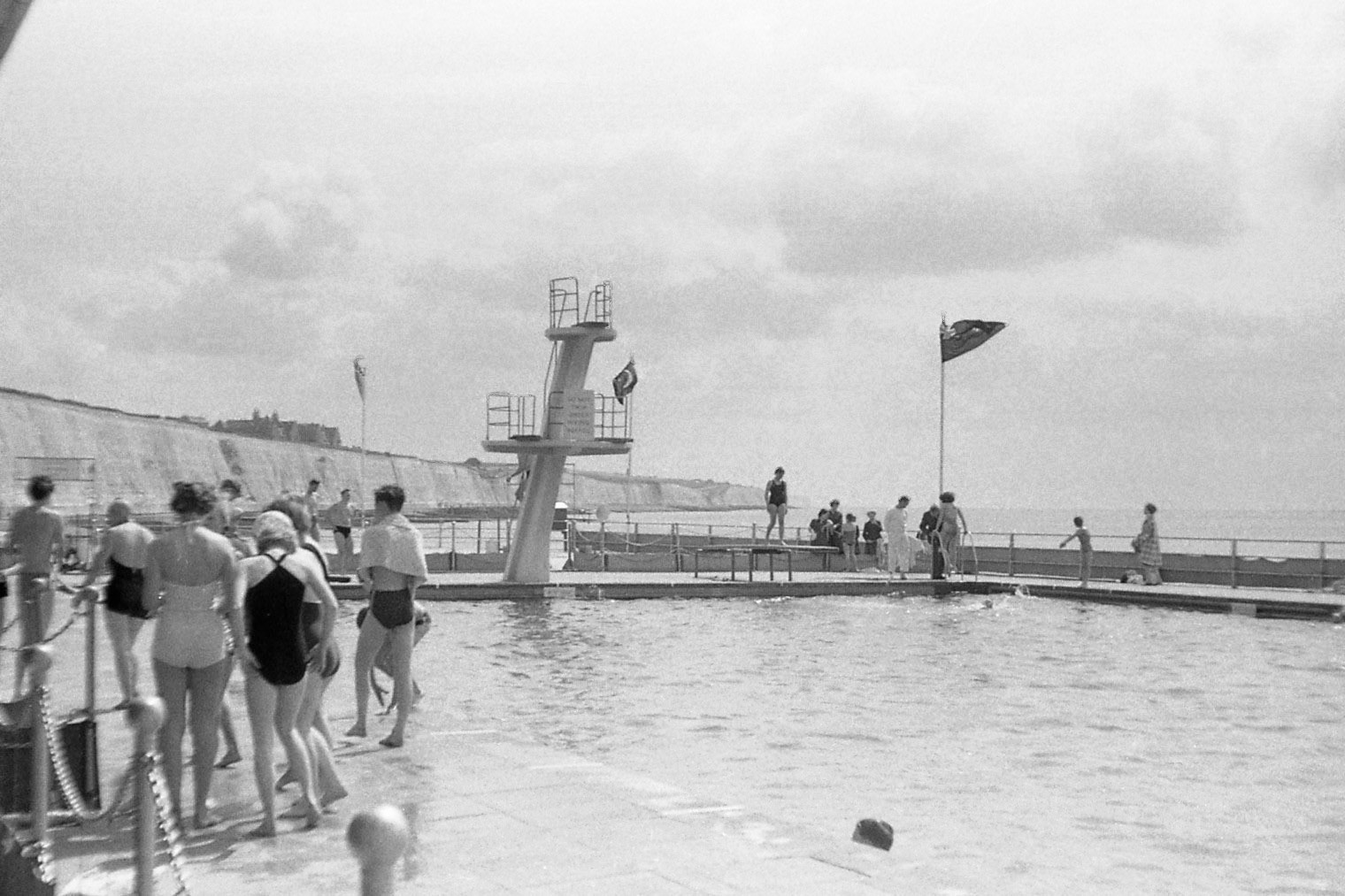
Black Rock Pool, 1961

In 1936 an Art Deco lido was constructed at beach level, but this was closed in 1978 and demolished in 1979.

The area is served by an extension of the Volk's Electric Railway, which has remained in use thanks to the proximity of the marina, although the line was shortened when the marina and associated coastal defences were built in the early 1970s. The cliff-top houses were also lost to allow for the marina's approach roads. A new Black Rock railway terminus station for the Volk's Railway was constructed in the 1990s, controversially slightly off-centre when compared with the terraces behind it which lead up to Lewes Crescent, Kemp Town.

== Future ==
Brighton and Hove City Council have plans to develop the site with a predominantly leisure use. From 2007 there have been plans to construct a multi-purpose sports arena with adjacent ice rink, however in July 2012 the Council considered those plans were no longer viable and has since sought a new development partner.

== See also ==
- Brighton to Newhaven Cliffs, a Site of Special Scientific Interest (SSSI) extending eastwards from Black Rock.
