= Pelham Puppets =

English toy-making company

Pelham Puppets were simple wooden marionette puppets made in England by Bob Pelham (1919–1980), starting in 1947. While mainly known for making marionettes, his company also manufactured glove puppets, rod puppets and ventriloquist puppets. The company ceased to trade in 1993 and some of its products became collectable.

== History ==
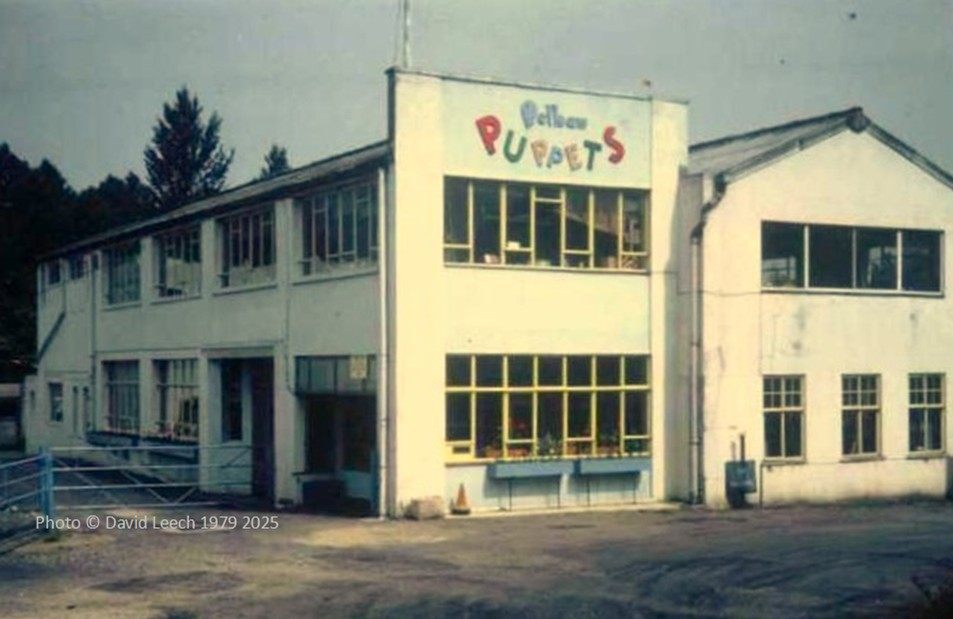
Pelham Puppet Factory in 1979

Bob Pelham initially started the company as Wonky Toys Ltd on 20 May 1947. The name came from Bob's Second World War military nickname, when he was known as "The Wonky Donkey Officer" as he made small toy donkeys. The company originally started making "Waloukas", simple wooden toys held together with string. Bob then moved on to making marionettes to sell to children, a new direction as previously marionettes had only been made for professionals. On 14 October 1948 the company changed its name to Pelham Puppets to reflect the change in focus.

One of the keys to the success of the company was the creation of the Pelpup Club for children, which helped to advertise the company's products.

The factory was initially located in Marlborough, Wiltshire. A fire in 1961 created a hiatus in manufacturing and led to new ranges being introduced in 1963 and old lines being stopped. The factory was rebuilt and grew in size at the same location, until the site was sold and the factory moved in 1985 to Collingbourne Ducis, also in Wiltshire. It moved again to Gloucestershire in the early 1990s, but the company went into liquidation in 1993.

Bob Pelham continued to head the company and was assisted by his wife Ann. After Bob's death on 19 June 1980, she continued with the business until 1986. In 2008 the Pelham Puppets brand was revived by a former employee, David Leech, and he now produces a new line of puppets, some echoing former styles.

Pelham Puppets are collectible, and those in good condition can change hands for significant amounts of money. There are a number of websites devoted to collecting these puppets.

== Products ==
=== Main models ===
There are many ranges of Pelham puppets. The main ones are:

- The LS range, 12-inch puppets with half wooden ball feet, wooden heads and waxed string holding the parts together.
- The SS range, similar to the LS range but with wooden toggle feet and screw eyes holding the body together.
- The SL range, usually with moulded heads and held together with either string or screw eyes.
- The SM range, with moving mouths, usually with larger wooden balls for heads but some have moulded heads.
- The JC (Junior Control) range, a smaller simpler puppet intended for younger children.
- The Jumpette range, smaller puppet again, much simpler and intended for infants and toddlers.
- The A, LA or Animal, usually non-anthropomorphic versions of animals. The LA code is used on earlier animals (1950s).
- The G range, glove puppets, usually with moulded heads and fabric or felt bodies.
- The Minipup, a range of smaller animal puppets.
- The WH range, the same size as JC puppets except these tended to have larger heads and were the first to have printed faces.
- The Vent range, a simple ventriloquist puppet, made from 1968 onwards.

Pelham Puppets also made puppets to order for the professional market, used by various companies in their shows. These tend to be larger, ranging from 18" to 2'6".

=== Most common models ===
Puppets that are very common due to mass manufacturing are:

- SS Gypsy – usually a red satin skirt with ricrac braid and a white top with round hoop earrings.
- SS Clown – a one-piece clown suit and felt conical hat with fur for hair, usually brightly coloured.
- SS Tyrolean Boy and Girl – both wear a felt belt and braces which match their hats; the girl has felt flowers on hers; the boy wears shorts.
- SS Mitzi and Fritzi: Mitzi has a wide-brimmed hat with a felt flower, a black felt waist girdle, white top and a patterned skirt. Fritzi is in a red jacket, grey with red striped trousers, with a black felt hat and feather attached at the front.
- SS Dutch Boy and Girl – both wear waistcoats and have check trousers or skirt with patches sewn on and felt hats.
- SL Bimbo – a clown with black tailcoat, white face with colourful markings, bow tie and black and white check trousers. There are two versions of Bimbo: one much earlier with a slightly larger head, ears and hands, and the later, more common, with smaller head, hands and ears.
- SL Wolf – wears a pair of trousers and a cape, the rest of his body is covered in grey fur (part of the 1963 range).
- SL Witch – with green face, hands and red shoes. She wears a black dress and a black felt pointed hat.
- SM Witch – with a pink face, teeth in her moving mouth, a coloured apron, black dress and pointed hat.
- SM Clown – wears a one-piece clown suit (sometimes with contrasting sides), has a pink face and coloured fur hair with a felt conical hat of bright colour.
- SM Policeman – wears a blue UK 1950/ 60's policeman's uniform with a striped section on one sleeve and a truncheon in the opposite hand.

Some of the rarer Pelham puppets include the Alice in Wonderland range from the 1950s (not to be confused with the later 1980s Alice); the range consists of Alice, Mad Hatter, March Hare, White Rabbit, Duchess (sometimes with a baby), Queen of Hearts, King of Hearts, Knave of Hearts, Cook, Fish & Frog Footman. Other rarities are SM Hank, Mr Turnip, Sarah Swede, Colonel Beetroot from the television programme Whirligig, the SS Bookworm family – Professor, Julia and Billy; SL Lettuce Leefe, SL Harris Tweed, SL Bull (1963 range), SL Cow (1963 range), SL Fox (1963 range), SM Huntsman, SM Villain, SM Harlequin and the very rare SL Tortoise (1963 range).

=== Boxes ===
The boxes the puppets were packed in usually denote the time period that the puppets were made. However the toys can be found in erroneous boxes, sometimes being sold in the wrong one having been repackaged in the shop by mistake after display.

- 1947–1955: early boxes were two-part trays with lids made of brown card and a label glued to the lid.
- 1955–1961: yellow two-part tray boxes showing various puppets; one side has the Witch on the left and the Mad Hatter in the centre.
- 1962 – mid 1980s: a similar yellow box; the Snake Charmer replaces the Mad Hatter.
- 1963 onwards: the larger yellow two-part tray box has the Three Bears on the side.
- 1968 onwards: the box has a sleeve with a full-length cellophane window cut into it, showing the puppet inside.
- 1969 onwards: the window is in two parts, with a logo on the divider.
- 1980: the deluxe range box has a divided window and a dragon on its side.
- 1987: red and yellow candy-striped boxes reminiscent of a Punch and Judy booth; also the blue "collectors" series.

== Commemoration ==
In 2019, a blue plaque was erected in Kingsbury Street, Marlborough, near the former site of the puppet workshop.
