= Net News Daily =

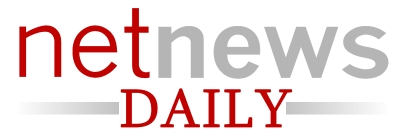
- Company type: Partnership
- Website type: News & blogging
- Available in: English
- Founded: 8 January 2009; 17 years ago
- Headquarters: Aberdeenshire, Scotland
- Area served: Worldwide (based on Scottish subjects)
- Founder: Scott Campbell (journalist)
- Employees: 12
- Website: www.netnewsdaily.com
- Current status: Offline

Net News Daily (NND) is a British news website. The site covers a range of topics, such as technology and entertainment and includes a prominent interviews section. Net News Daily was launched on 8 January 2009 as a simple news blog, but has grown since then.

== Site popularity ==
The site's creators have claimed in interviews that NND receives up to 5000 visitors per day.

== Interviews ==
The site has conducted interviews with YouTube stars and people involved in breaking news stories.

=== Michael Mooney ===
Michael Mooney was the creator of Mikeyy, a malicious worm on Twitter. He was interviewed by NND, during which Mooney revealed information that other media outlets did not already know. The interview was cited by Sky News and Computerworld.
