= Brighton and Rottingdean Seashore Electric Railway =

Former railway in England

Coordinates: 50°48′19″N 0°4′30″W

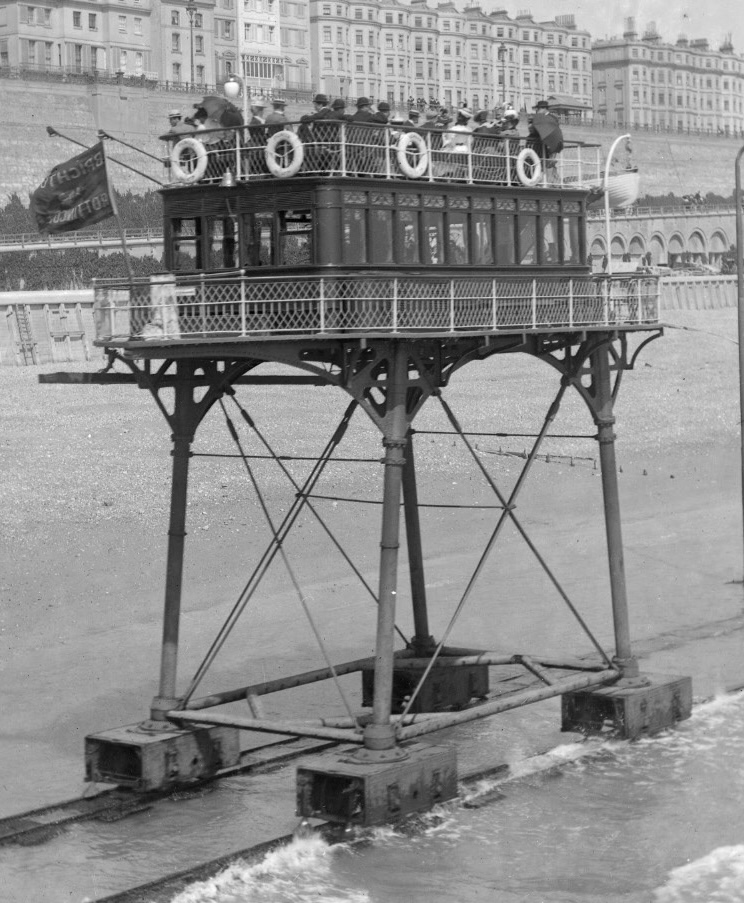
Pioneer on the 18 ft (5,486 mm) gauge railway (Note: An access ladder, slung horizontally below the deck, can be seen. The white pillar at the end of the deck carries the tram-style controls. (A widely circulated image from the Gloucester Railway Carriage and Wagon Company incorrectly shows a fixed staircase to ground level and no external controls.))

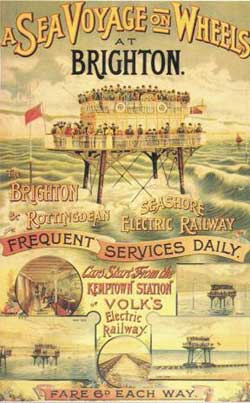
An advertisement, offering "a Sea Voyage on Wheels"

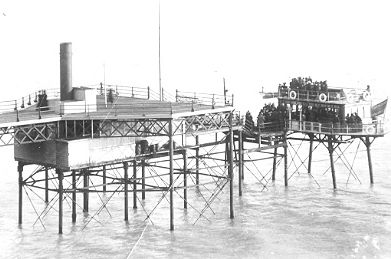
Pier at Rottingdean, with generating room below

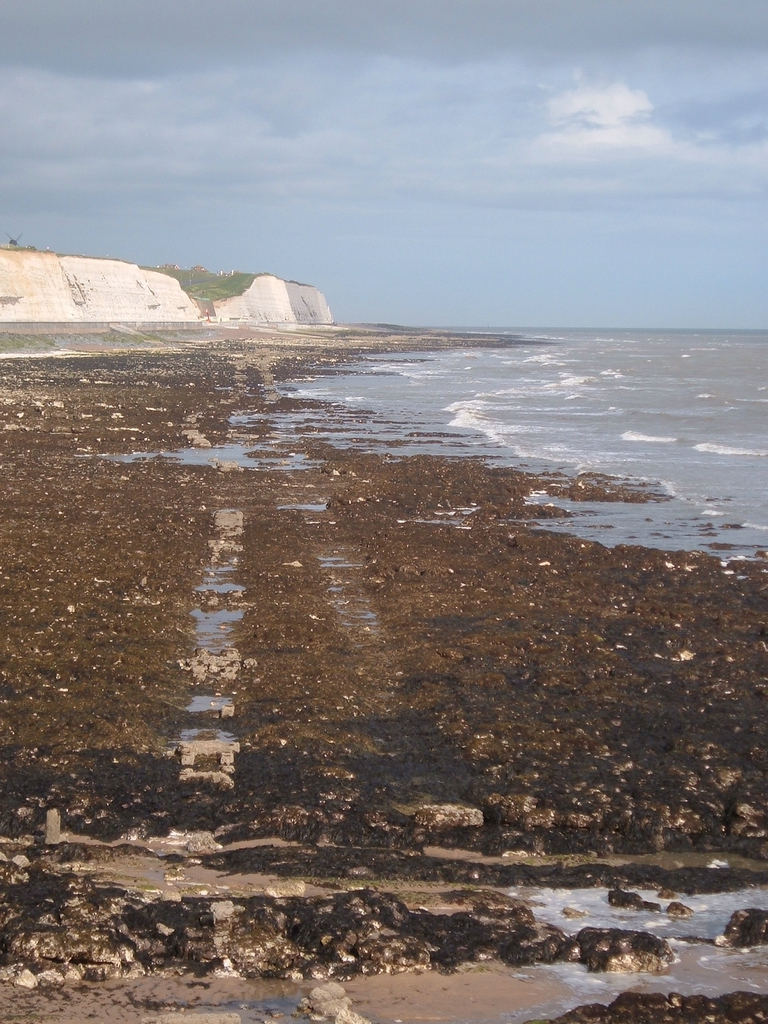
The former trackbed in 2004

The Brighton and Rottingdean Seashore Electric Railway was a unique coastline railway in Brighton, England, that ran through the shallow coastal waters of the English Channel between 1896 and 1901. It was designed by Magnus Volk to extend his Volk's Electric Railway from its terminus in Paston Place to the village of Rottingdean and avoid difficult terrain. While the railway was popular and carried tens of thousands of passengers, it was ultimately abandoned to make room for new sea defences, and Volk was unable to raise the funds to construct a replacement.

== Background and construction ==
Magnus Volk, its owner, designer and engineer, had already been successful with the more conventional Volk's Electric Railway, which had then not been extended east of Paston Place. With 100-foot (30 m) sea-cliffs blocking the route eastwards, Volk decided to construct a line through the surf from a pier at Paston Place to one at Rottingdean.

The railway consisted of two parallel 2 ft 8 1/2 in (825 mm) gauge tracks, billed as 18 ft (5,486 mm) gauge, the measurement between the outermost rails. The tracks were laid on concrete sleepers at about 3-foot (1 m) intervals. These were cast in situ using materials lowered down the cliff-face, then mortised into the rock underlying the beach sand. The single car used on the railway was a 45 by 22 ft (13.7 by 6.7 m) pier-like structure which stood on four 23 ft (7.0 m)-long legs. It was designed by Richard St George Moore (also responsible for the jetties at either end of the line), the construction engineer for Brighton Pier. The cost was £30,000 (equivalent to £3,400,000 in 2025). The contract to build the vehicle was awarded to the Gloucester Railway Carriage and Wagon Company.

Although originally intended to be powered by a compressed-gas fuelled internal combustion engine, or electrical accumulators, electricity from an external supply was decided upon, carried by an overhead line suspended alongside the tracks. Earth return was through the rails, or the sea itself at high tide. The power station, beneath the pier at Rottingdean, was equipped with a 100-horsepower (75 kW) steam engine from William Sissons and Co. of Gloucester, driving a 50 kW dynamo at 500 volts. In 1900 this equipment was replaced by power drawn from the public supply of Brighton Corporation.

The car weighed 45 long tons (50 short tons; 46 t) and was propelled by two General Electric 30-horsepower (22 kW) electric motors, mounted in the saloon and operating through shafts to bevel gears on two of the four bogies. Rod-operated brakes were fitted to the other two bogies. The tram-style controls were at each end of the deck. The car was provided with a lifeboat, a ship's bell, and other safety measures. Construction took two years, from 1894 to 1896. The vehicle was officially named Pioneer, but many called it Daddy Long-Legs.

The railway officially opened on 28 November 1896, but was nearly destroyed by a storm the night of 4 December. Volk immediately began rebuilding the railway, including the Pioneer, which had been knocked on its side. Pioneer was salvaged and rebuilt, with the legs two feet higher than the previous design. After repairs to vehicle and track were complete, service resumed on 20 July 1897. Due to regulations then in place, a qualified sea captain was on board at all times. By the end of that year, 44,282 passengers had travelled on Volk's "Sea Voyage on Wheels".

== In use ==
The railway was popular, but encountered difficulties. The car was slowed considerably at high tide, but Volk could never afford to improve the motors. In 1900, groynes built near the railway were found to have led to underwater scouring under the sleepers and the railway was closed during portions of July and August of that year while this was repaired. Immediately afterwards, the council decided to build a beach protection barrier, which would require Volk to divert his line around it. Without funds to do so, Volk closed the railway.

In 1901, the right-of-way was broken up for construction of the barrier. One further attempt was made to raise money for a conventional over-water viaduct along roughly the same route, but Volk was unable to gather enough funds, and nothing came of this.

== Legacy ==
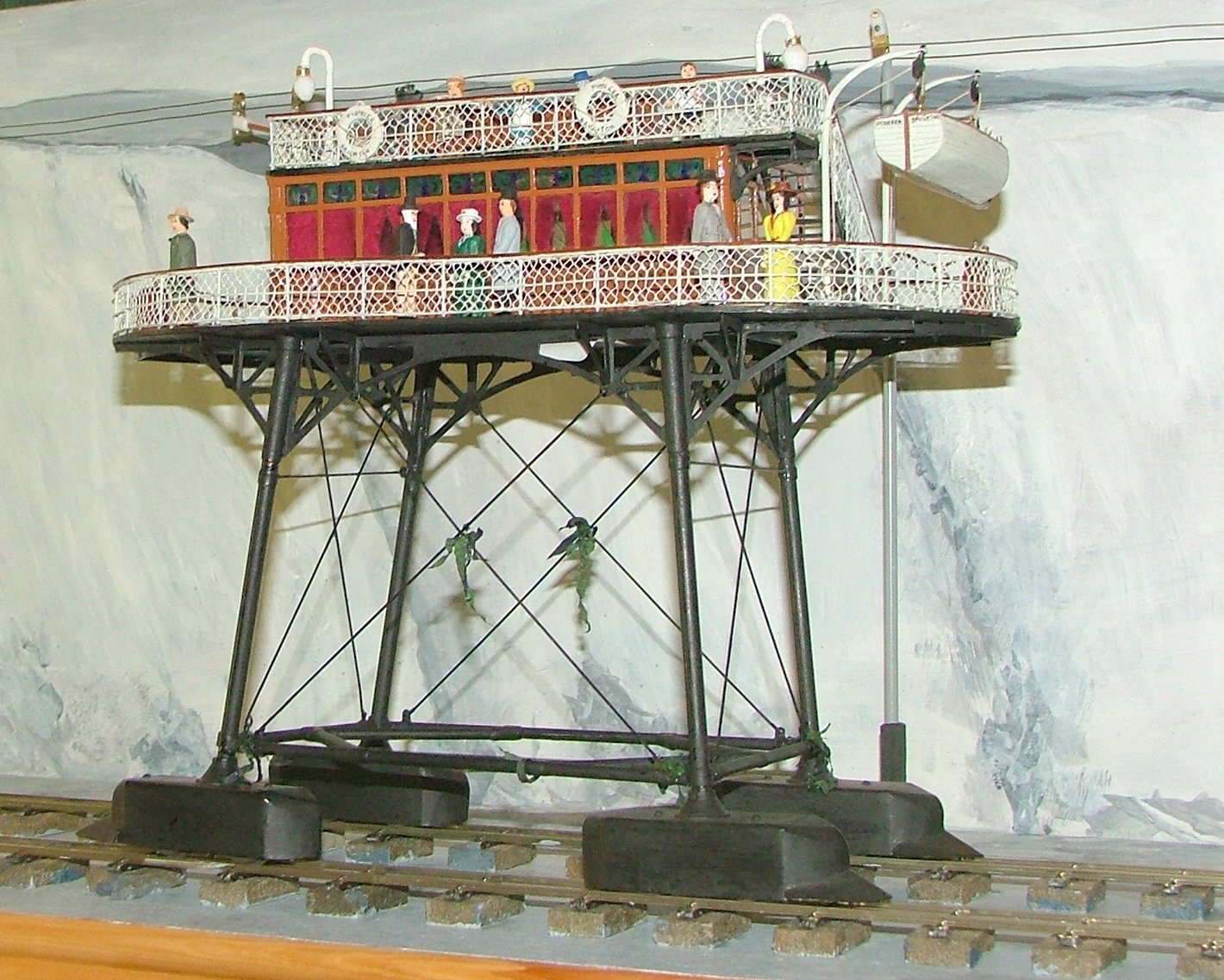
Model of Pioneer in the Brighton Toy and Model Museum

The track, car and other structures were sold for scrap. As of 2021, some of the concrete sleepers can still be viewed at low tide. Eventually Volk's Electric Railway was extended along the seafront as far as Black Rock, Kemptown, a small portion of the original length of the marine railway; it remains in operation.

A model of the railway car is on display, along with a poster for the railway, in the Brighton Toy and Model Museum and the visitor centre of the Volks Electric Railway.

== Similar forms of transport ==
=== On rails ===
- St. Malo, France, between 1873 and 1923 had a 110-yard (100 m) single-track railway across the harbour, running on submerged rails, bearing a strong resemblance to Volk's Pioneer. The vehicle was cable-hauled rather than self-propelled.
- Some ferries are arranged to operate on underwater rails. For example, some diesel-powered ferries across the Amsterdam-Rhine Canal in The Netherlands.
- Several theme-park attractions, including the Mark Twain Riverboat at Disneyland, feature vehicles guided by submerged rails or guideways.

=== Other ===
- BARV, a tracked military vehicle designed to wade through seawater up to 3 metres (9 ft 10 in) deep.
- Sea tractor, a motor vehicle that can travel through shallow water, with driver and passengers on a raised platform.
