= Moritz Immisch =

Moritz Immisch (12 March 1838 – 20 September 1903) was an Electrical engineer, watchmaker and inventor.

He was born on 12 March 1838 in Niederschmon, near Querfurt in Germany and died 20 September 1903 in London.

Always known as 'Moritz Immisch', his full name was Karl Moritz, the eldest son of August Christian Immisch, a watchmaker. He received a technical education in the state of Thuringia, graduating from university in his native country, before leaving Germany around 1860 to seek opportunities in England, particularly in London. He migrated with one of his younger brothers, Bernhardt Theodore Immisch, who had also trained as a watchmaker with their father. Both settled in England; Moritz marrying Emma Elizabeth Welch at St John's Church, Marylebone, London in 1876. Twenty years later, at the request of his English family Moritz became a naturalised British citizen.

== Watchmaking ==
Immisch found opportunities to apply his watchmaking skills, developing precision clockwork mechanisms, improving practical details and considering the further applications of the physical processes involved. From 1863 he was employed as foreman to the noted firm Le Roy & Fils at their premises on Regent St. In 1872, when already a Council Member of the British Horological Institute, he submitted an essay on 'The balance spring and its isochronal adjustments' which was awarded the Institute's Baroness Burdett Coutts Prize Immisch's prize essay was published in book form - a work which remained in print for many years.

== Instrument making ==
In 1881 Immisch obtained a patent for a remarkably small watch-shaped thermometer, functioning on the variable expansive properties of fluid in a Bourdon tube. This metallic instrument was designed to be more robust than contemporary glass thermometers filled with mercury - for this reason it was first branded as an 'avitreous', or metallic thermometer. The speed of the temperature-expansion and the calibration of the watch-dial indicator allowed very accurate readings to be taken, and its small size made it highly portable as a clinical instrument.

Hundreds of Immisch thermometers were tested for accuracy at the Kew Observatory every year after its launch. It was awarded a Silver Medal at the International Medical Congress of 1881 and received awards at the Inventions Exhibition of 1885 in London, as well as the Exposition Universelle in Antwerp and the Gewerbe und Industrie Ausstellung in Görlitz, also in 1885.

Its small size made the device very popular and it was referred to in many medical journals throughout the 1880s both in England and in the US.
Immisch himself later wrote an article comparing the merits of his thermometer with others then in use for the New York Medical Journal in 1889.

== Electrical work ==
=== The Immisch Electric Motor ===
Immisch's most significant work was in connection with early applications of electric motors. He had long been interested in the science of electricity and magnetism; as far back as the 1860s he understood the basic principles and measurements of resistance, voltage, and current. In applying his mechanical skills and practical scientific approach to electro-magnetism, he entered into the design and construction of electric motors, of 'electro-motors' as they were then known. By 1880, his experiments in small dynamo-electric machines had led him to step away from watchwork and explore the new opportunities in the nascent electrical engineering industry. In 1882 he patented 'An improved electro-motor' and, together with a small number of friends and colleagues, he established a small company 'Messrs M. Immisch & Co.' with works in Kentish Town, first at Perry Road and then much more substantially at the larger premises at 19 Malden Crescent.

=== Messrs Immisch & Co. ===
The company was established in the Summer of 1882, composed of a number of fellow electrical enthusiasts and London businessmen. Foremost amongst them was Immisch's friend and partner, Frederick William John Hubel, who was himself formerly involved in watchwork, but who left the trade to become an 'electrician', and commercial partner in the development of the company's electrical undertakings.

==== Industrial and other power applications ====
The company spent several years improving the existing design of direct current motors, improving their efficiency and power-to-weight performance a compared to contemporary manufacturers such as Siemens, Elwell Parker, and Mather and Platt. The company was particularly active in seeking new industrial applications for their products. From 1888 onwards they had notable success in the application of their motors to pumping and haulage work in mines, carrying out installations in England, Scotland and Wales.

==== Electric Vehicles ====
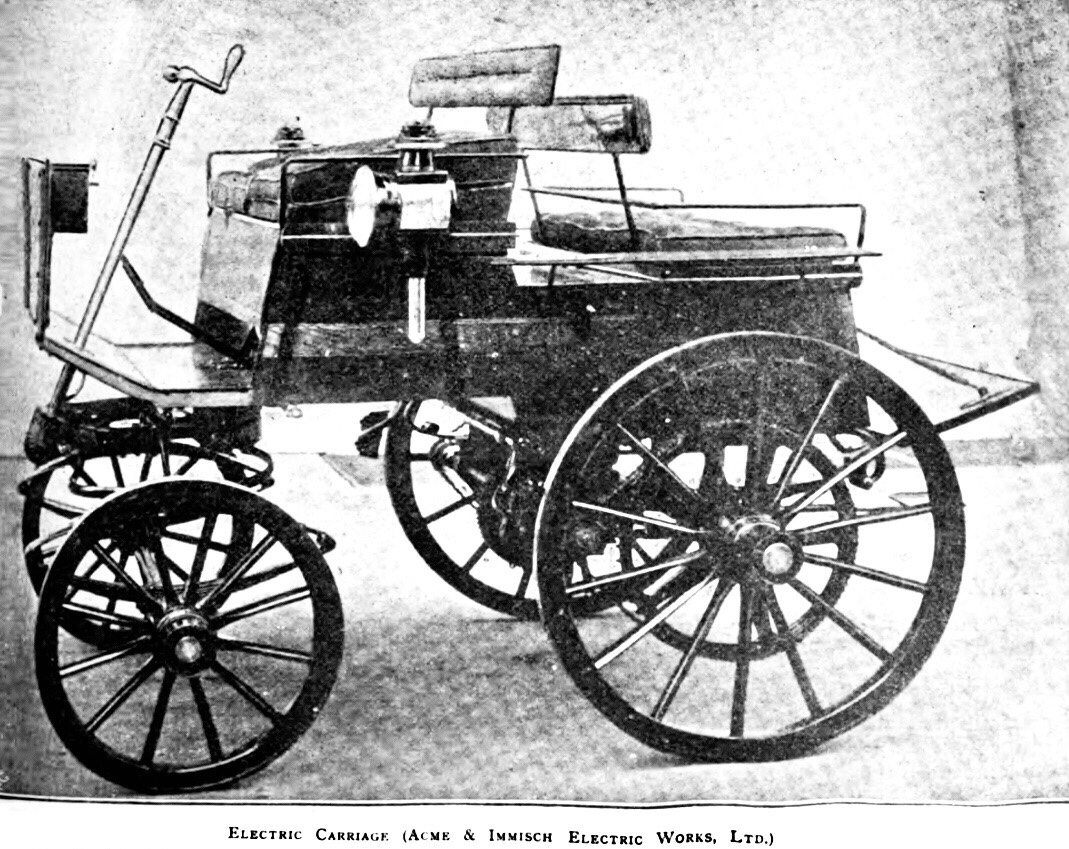
Acme & Immisch Electric Works (1887-1897)

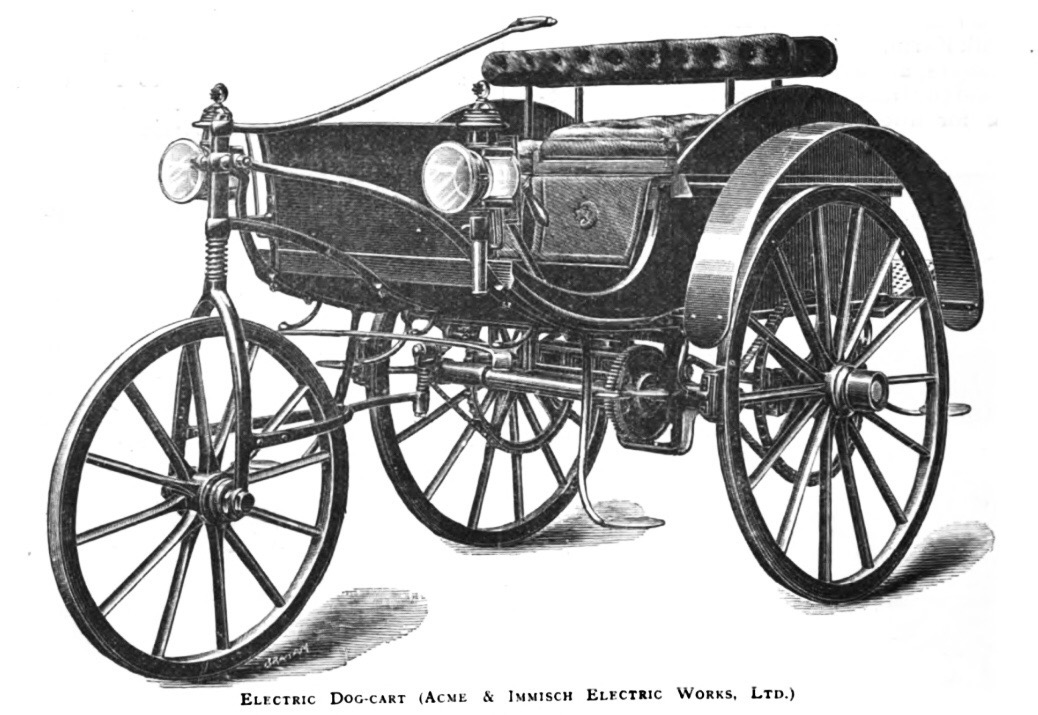
Acme & Immisch Electric Works dog-cart (1887-1897)

The Immisch name also came to be associated with some of the earliest electric cars produced in England. Immisch motors, geared with chains made by Hans Renold were fitted to a series of electrical carriages and dogcarts reported in the electrical press in 1887, 1888, 1889, 1890 and 1896. The first two electric vehicles were carried out in association with Magnus Volk, himself an inventor and engineer. News and illustrations of the 3- and 4-wheel vehicles produced for the Sultan of Turkey Abdul Hamid II, brought both men to international notice.

==== Electric Boats ====
Immisch & Co also employed Magnus Volk as a manager in the development of their electric launch department - probably the world's first fleet of electric launches for hire, with a chain of electrical charging stations established along the River Thames. The company built its headquarters on the island called Platt's Eyot. After 12 months of experimental work starting in 1888 with a randan skiff, the firm commissioned the construction of hulls which they equipped with electrical apparatus. From 1889 until just before the First World War the boating season and regattas saw the silent electric boats plying their way up and downstream.

==== Electric Tram ====
Like his contemporary and fellow electric launch pioneer, Anthony Reckenzaun, Immisch became interested in the development of electric traction for urban transport. Both men had designed and built electric motors to be fitted to tramcars for the public and light railways for industrial purposes.

At the end of 1888 and during 1889 the Electric Traction Company, employing Immisch machinery and expertise, had instigated a trial of accumulator tramcars on the Barking Road section of the North Metropolitan Tramways Company's network. This small mile-long single-line track from Plaistow to Canning Town was chosen to prove the economy and reliability of the electric system. The 52 seat tramcars, 6 in total (4 on the road at any one time), ran daily from June 1889 until August 1892.

In 1890, with hopes of a large scale expansion of electric traction on the existing horse-drawn tramways, Immisch's Company, together with the Electric Traction Company chaired by Viscount Bury, sold itself to the General Electric Power and Traction Company Limited. This new company soon foundered however due to its reliance on rechargeable battery traction.

Despite the North Metropolitan Tramways Company having obtained a private act, the North Metropolitan Tramways Act 1890 (53 & 54 Vict. c. xlvi), to employ such electric tramcars throughout the network, the ultimate approval remained with the local authorities through whose areas the trams ran. In a time of growing municipal powers, the old contracting leases of the Tramways Act 1870 (33 & 34 Vict. c. 78) were expiring and local authorities in the UK looked to buy out old lines from the tramway companies, to develop services of their own.

These obstacles, together with the high costs of maintaining the accumulators on such a small installation were the end of the system, and it was evident that the General Electric Power and Traction Company had, in the circumstances, been overcapitalised. It was wound up in 1894.

In 1891 an Immisch motor was used in a tramcar tested on the experimental John Gordon closed conduit (or closed culvert) electric tramway system. The tests took place in the Merryweather & Sons works in Greenwich, known for its fire engines and steam trams, showing success although the system was not commercially adopted. (Letter from Merryweather & Sons to (London) Standard, and Morning Post 21 Oct 1891; same letter to Pall Mall Gazette 31 Oct 1891; also quoted in The Queenslander (Australia), 19 Dec 1891).

== Final Years ==
Immisch continued to be involved in manufacturing work for a couple of years in the Acme Immisch Electric Works Company Ltd, but afterwards he retained an interest only as a director in the Immisch Electric Launch Company until his resignation in 1901. Having suffered from heart problems for a number of years, he died two years later.

Obituaries acknowledged his early enterprise:

The world has lost one of the earliest pioneers in the development of electric power. A born inventor; his mind teemed with ideas...
