= Magnus Volk =

British-German electrical engineer

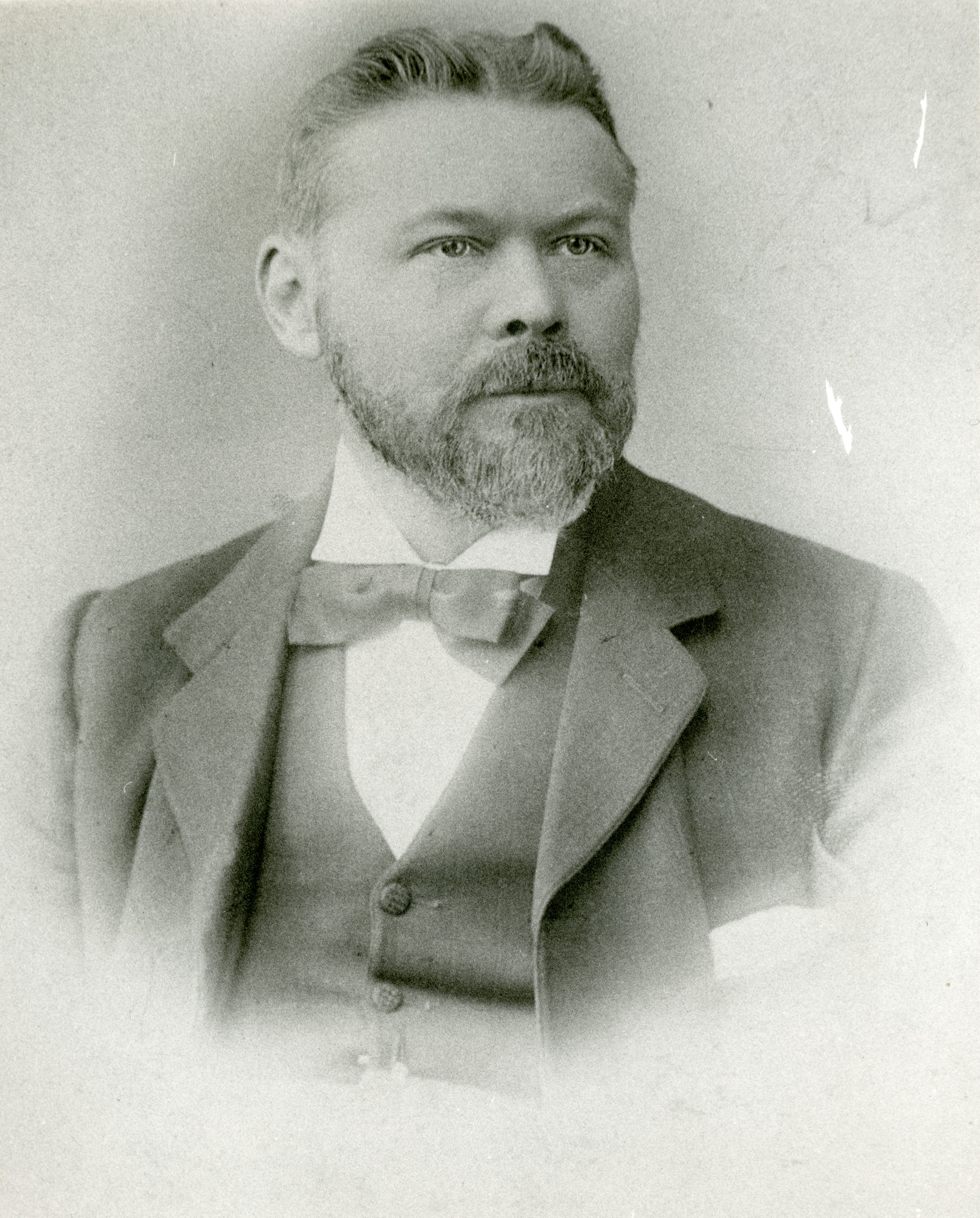
- Magnus Volk, copyright Royal Pavilion & Museums, Brighton & Hove.
- Born: 19 October 1851; Brighton, Sussex, United Kingdom
- Died: 20 May 1937 (aged 85); Brighton, Sussex, United Kingdom
- Resting place: St. Wulfran's Church, Ovingdean, Sussex
- Spouse: Anna Volk (Banfield)
- Children: Magnus Herman Volk, George Herbert Volk, Cecil Volk, Gordon Volk, Edgar Volk, Conrad Volk, Muriel May Volk
- Parent(s): Magnus Volk, Sarah Volk (Maynard)
- Engineering career
- Discipline: Electrical, Mechanical
- Institutions: Imperial Institute
- Projects: Volk's Electric Railway, Brighton and Rottingdean Seashore Electric Railway
- Awards: Order of Osmali

Magnus Volk FII (1851–1937) was a British-German inventor and pioneering electrical engineer.

He is most notable for having built Volk's Electric Railway, the world's oldest operating electric railway.

== Career ==
Aside from the Volk's Electric Railway, he also built the unique but short-lived Brighton and Rottingdean Seashore Electric Railway, together with its unusual Daddy Long Legs vehicle. He also built another short-lived line, similar to the VER, in the pleasure grounds at Aston Hall, Birmingham.

In 1887 he attracted attention in Brighton by building a three-wheeled electric carriage powered by an Immisch motor. In 1888 he built another electric car, this time a four-wheeled carriage which was made to the order of the Sultan of the Ottoman Empire, for which he was awarded an Order of Osmali, presented to Magnus by the Sultan in person whilst in Constantinople.

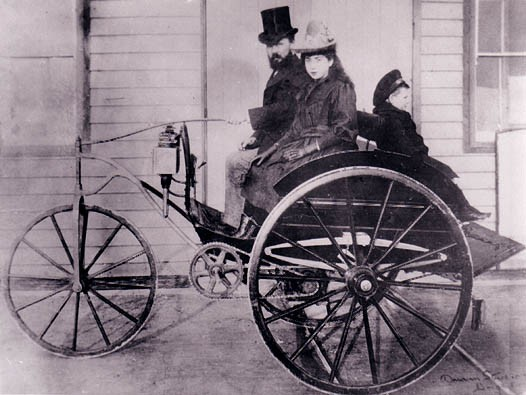
Magnus Volk on his electric dog cart, 1897

Other projects of Magnus included inventing a fire-alarm system, early successful attempts at electricity in the home, telecommunications and installing electricity to the Royal Pavilion for the first time.

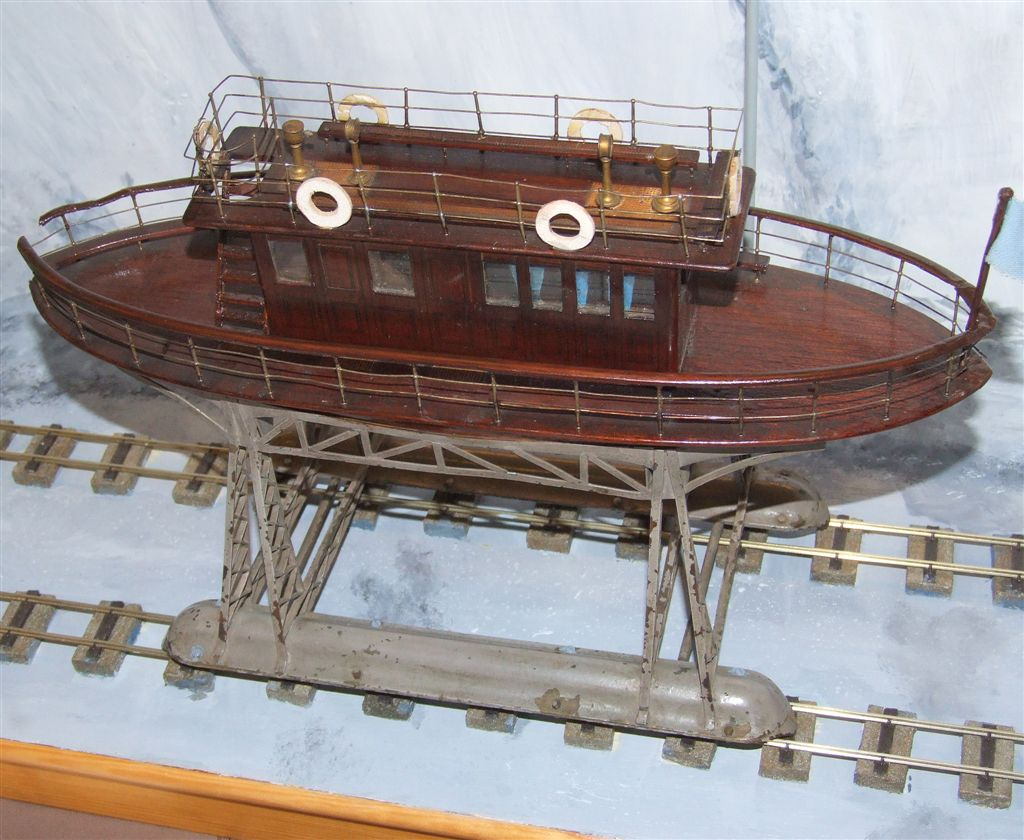
A proof of concept model of the Daddy Long Legs built by Magnus Volk.

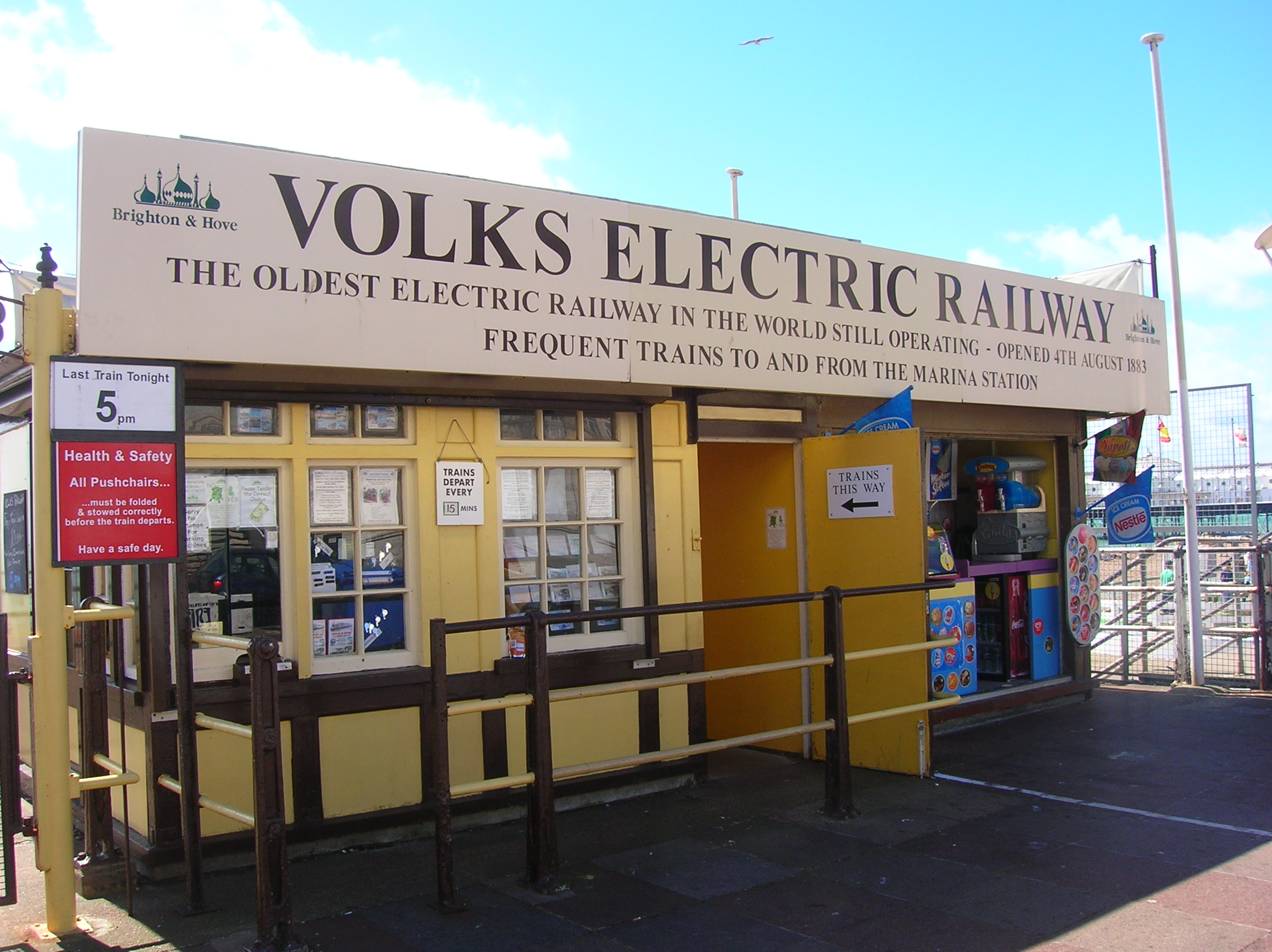
The Volk's Electric Railway still bears Magnus Volk's name

== Personal life ==
Magnus Volk was the son of a German clockmaker and was born on 19 October 1851 in Brighton. He lived at 38 Dyke Road in Brighton. On 8 April 1879, he married Anna Banfield in Burgess Hill. George Herbert Volk, his second son, is noted as a pioneer builder of seaplanes, whilst another son, Conrad Volk, wrote a biography of his father. His descendants include the musician Joe Volk and the journalist Scott Campbell.

Magnus Volk died in Brighton on 20 May 1937, and is buried at St Wulfran's churchyard in Ovingdean near Brighton.

== Bibliography ==
- Conrad Volk: Magnus Volk of Brighton. London & Chichester: Phillimore, 1971.
