= Jump the Queue =

1989 board game

- Designers: Wolfgang Riedesser
- Illustrators: Brian Gough
- Publishers: J. W. Spear & Sons
- Publication: 1989; 36 years ago
- Genres: Dice games
- Languages: English
- Players: 2-4
- Playing time: 30 minutes
- Age range: 6+

Jump the Queue is a board game published in 1989 by J. W. Spears.

== Contents ==
Jump the Queue is a game in which each player attempts to move five different vehicles through a queue of traffic.

== Reception ==
Ian Livingstone reviewed Jump the Queue for Games International magazine, and gave it 3 1/2 stars out of 5, and stated that "The quality of the components is good, as are the graphics."
