= Bayko =

English building model construction toy

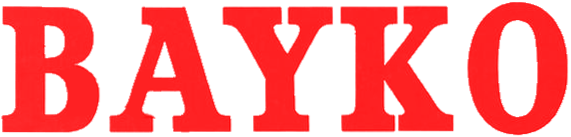
- Product type: Building model construction
- Produced by: Plimpton Engineering
- Country: U.K.
- Introduced: 1934 by Charles Plimpton
- Discontinued: 1967; 59 years ago
- Previous owners: Plimpton Engineering (1934–59); Meccano (1959-64)

Bayko was a British building model construction toy invented by Charles Plimpton, an early plastics engineer and entrepreneur in Liverpool. First marketed in Britain it was soon exported throughout the British Commonwealth and became a worldwide brand between 1934 and 1967. The name derived from Bakelite, one of the world's first commercial plastics that was originally used to manufacture many of the parts. Bayko was one of the world's earliest plastic toys to be marketed.

== Bayko system ==
Basic construction elements: base, rods and bricks, from a Plimpton era Bayko set

Bayko was primarily intended for the construction of model buildings. The rectangular Bakelite bases had a square grid of holes, spaced at 3/8 inch centres, into which thin metal rods, 75 thou [1.9 mm] in diameter, of various lengths, could be placed vertically. In order to make larger models, two or more bases could be joined together by means of metal links secured by screws through holes in the bases. Bakelite bricks, windows and other parts could then be slotted between pairs of rods in order to create the walls of the building. Other commonly used parts included floors (thin sheets of resin bonded paper with the same square pattern grid of holes as bases), and roofs of various types. There were also a large number of other more specialised parts. In the original sets bases were large, and coloured brown; walls were brown/maroon and cream; roofs were deep maroon; and windows were a very dark green, but by 1937 the 'true' colours of red or white walls, green windows and red roofs were established, though bases were still large and brown.

A period of radical change was heralded in 1938 with the introduction of the [now] much sought after 20s series, through which a number of new parts were introduced. Then, in 1939, the 'New Series' retooling programme added to the range of new parts and changed the bases to the more familiar, smaller version, initially in a mottled green. Post war the standard colours were red and white walls, red roofs, green windows and green bases, and, despite some experiments with 'rogue' colours in the years immediately after the war, these remained in play until 1959 when Meccano took over, changing the colours to orange red and cream bricks with yellow windows and grey bases.

Plimpton began the move to polystyrene parts, gradually, from the mid-1950s onwards, a change which Meccano subsequently took up with enthusiasm, it being so much cheaper to produce. Ironically perhaps, in the last days of Bayko, they began to reverse this change, of both materials and colour scheme, with the introduction of the so-called 'Flanged' or 'Minimalist' parts.

In the same era, a competitor to Bayko was Brickplayer. Brickplayer models were more authentic, and the Brickplayer system was more flexible. However it was also more time-consuming and intricate. Bayko models had a higher standard of realism than their other competitors, but the fragile Bakelite frequently broke.

== History ==
=== Plimpton era ===
See Charles Plimpton for early Bayko history.

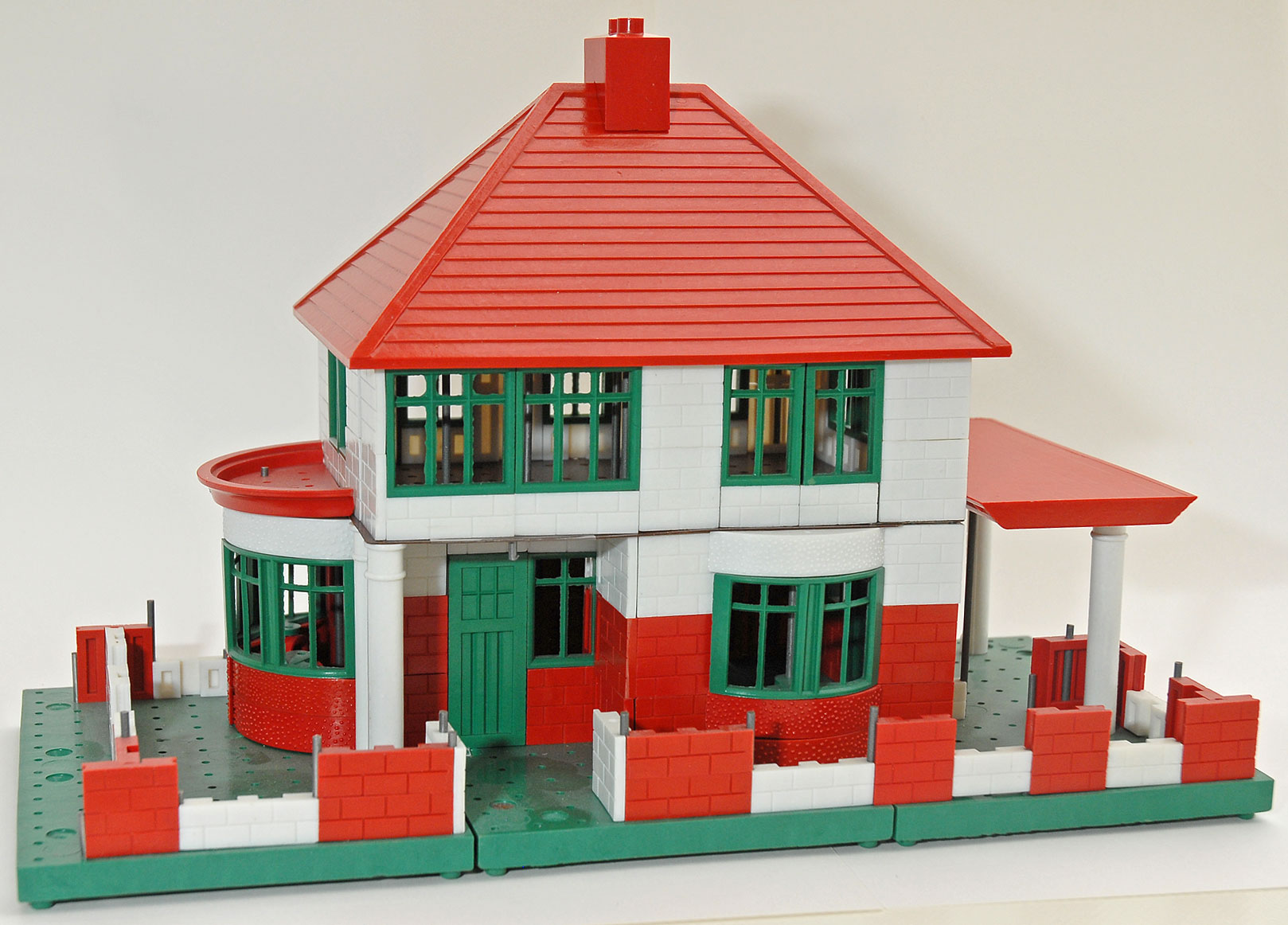
Example model house, built with a Plimpton era Bayko set

The Bayko system was invented and patented by Charles Plimpton in 1933, following a long period of convalescence in Ruthin in North Wales. Plimpton set up Plimpton Engineering in Liverpool, England, to manufacture the components, the majority of which were made from Bakelite, a new synthetic plastic developed in the early 1900s. The sets were called "Bayko Light Construction Sets" (the term "Bayko Light" coming from the name "Bakelite") and went on sale nationally towards the end of 1934. There had been, however, limited production, with sets literally packed on the kitchen table, 12 months earlier, presumably for a restricted, local market. The Bakelite material was sourced from Bakelite Limited, a Birmingham supplier, and for the first few years of its life, Bayko was marketed by both Plimpton Engineering and Bakelite Limited.

Initially five sets were produced, "Set 1" (the smallest, entry level) through to "Set 5" (the largest). The bricks were brown and cream, the bases brown, the windows dark green, and the roofs dark maroon. Plimpton began advertising Bayko in Meccano Ltd's Meccano Magazine in September 1935, unaware that 25 years later, Meccano itself would own and manufacture Bayko. Regular advertisements appeared in the magazine over those next 25 years.

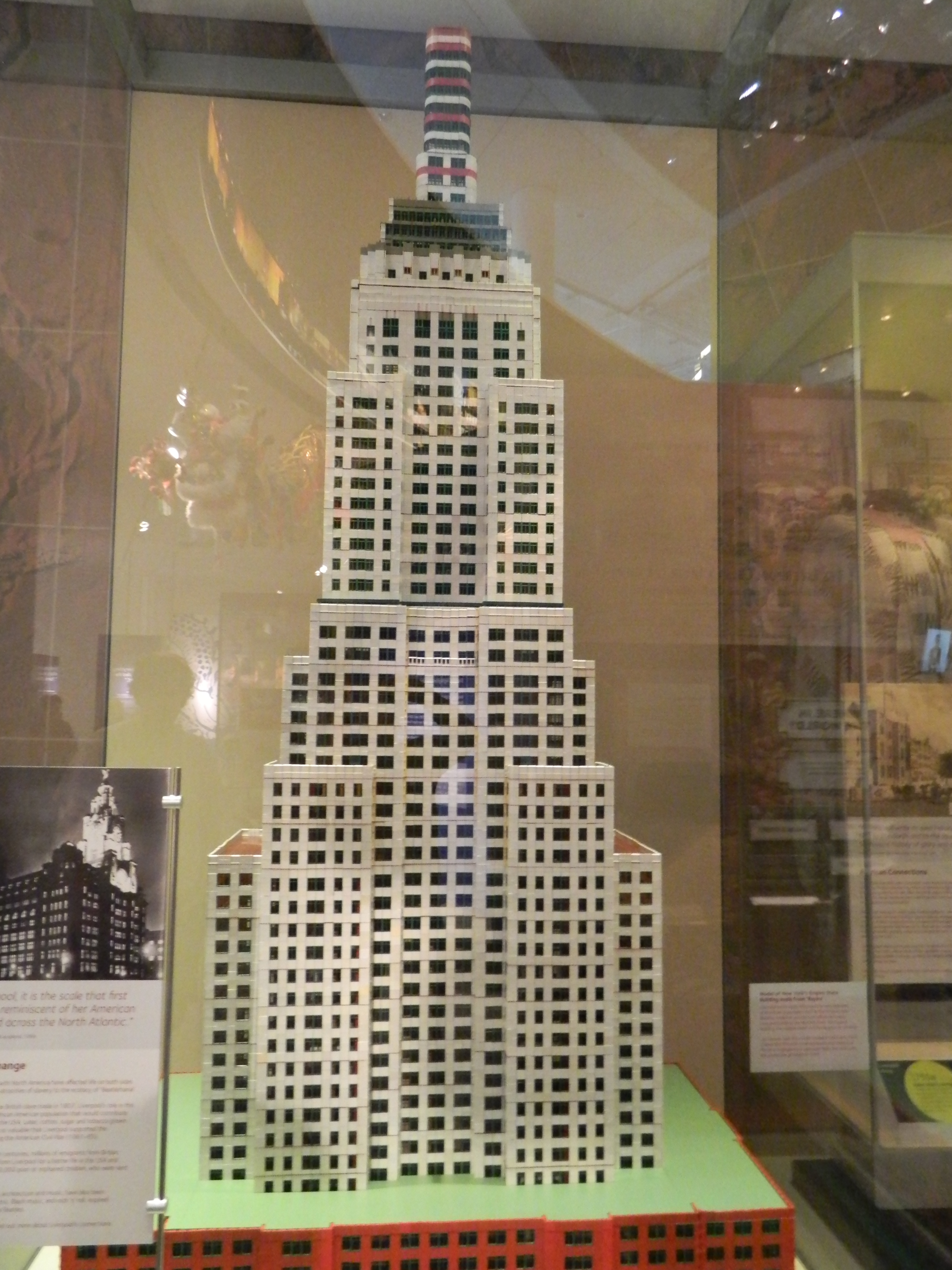
Bayko model of the Empire State Building in the Museum of Liverpool, built by Leo Janssen, 1999–2003

In 1935 three Ornamental Sets A, B and C were introduced that contained decorative parts to supplement the existing sets, including pillars, arches and mottled green roofs. In 1936 a "Set 6" was introduced, a much larger set than "Set 5" that included all the new ornamental parts. All the bricks in this set, initially, were 'Oak', a mottled brown colour made by the addition of sawdust to the resin, and sets like this were, and indeed remain, much cherished. In 1937 the familiar, long-lived colour scheme of red and white bricks with green windows was implemented for the standard sets. In late 1937, or early 1938, "Set 6" was also changed to the new standard colours and a conversion set, "set 5A", was introduced. However, until wartime austerity interrupted, any set could still be ordered in 'Oak'.

By 1938, the Bayko sets were described as "Bayko Building Sets", as a period of change began. The 20s series, updated Ornamental sets, were introduced, in which curved bricks and windows and orange turrets were perhaps the most noteworthy introductions. In 1939 all the existing sets were relaunched and replaced by a 'New Series' of six sets that incorporated new parts, still in the red, white and green colour scheme.

Production was interrupted in 1942 by World War II when the company switched to manufacturing for the war effort. When production resumed in 1946, the set range was reduced to three, "Set 0" to "Set 2", set "0" being a new, much smaller, entry level set, appropriate to these austere times. A "Set 3" was introduced in 1947.

Charles Plimpton died of tuberculosis in December 1948 and his wife Audrey Plimpton took over the running of Plimpton Engineering.

Further new parts were added to the sets in 1949 and 1950, probably from Charles Plimpton's innovation stream, were introduced to increase the realism and flexibility of the system. Although the initial plans had been for a further two sets, the range was completed in 1952 when "set 4" was introduced, which included all the parts except turrets.

By the late 1950s, suffering from a chronic lack of investment in new parts, Bayko came under great pressure from other construction toys that appeared on the market, and Audrey Plimpton retired in 1959. She sold the company to Meccano Ltd in 1959, though Brittains had also been in the frame.

=== Meccano era ===
Having acquired the rights to manufacture Bayko in 1959, Meccano Ltd moved production to its Meccano factory in Speke, Liverpool. To rationalise and simplify the system, all the Bayko sets were redesigned. Most of the decorative parts were dropped and the cumbersome one-piece roofs were replaced by flat-roof pieces. The colour scheme was changed to grey bases, light green roofs, yellow windows and doors, and orange-red and beige bricks. In order to reduce production costs, polystyrene was used for all the plastic parts instead of Bakelite.

After an unfortunately long gestation period, four Meccano Bayko sets went on sale from the end of 1960 into 1961, numbered 11 to 14 to avoid being confused with the Plimpton sets. The Bayko adverts continued in Meccano Magazine, and — due to the success of the cost-cutting measures — the new sets were sold at a significantly lower price than the Plimpton sets. In 1962 Meccano introduced its own decorative pieces, including opening French windows, large shop windows and pantile roofs, together with a new "Set 15" which included them all.

By 1963 Meccano Ltd also began feeling the pressure of competing toys, even though the models Bayko produced were more realistic architectural constructions, and advertising was increasingly scarce, even in Meccano Magazine, their own publication. By 1964, now under the Tri-ang ownership, all advertising for Bayko was stopped, although Meccano continued manufacturing Bayko sets and spares until 1967.

Strangely, as Bayko was being 'milked' as it struggled, unsupported in the market place, another re-tooling programme was begun. This comprised the introduction of the 'Flanged' or 'Minimalist' bricks and related parts, reverting to red and white bricks, but this programme of change was stopped halfway through. Eventually the 'milking' led to a deterioration of standards as mixed colour sets were churned out.

Over its lifespan, both Plimpton and Meccano Bayko was exported across the world, and, besides being a toy, it attracted a modest adult following that still exists today. A healthy trade in original Bayko sets and parts also exists today, with some enthusiasts even casting their own Bayko pieces.
