= Victory jigsaw puzzle =

Brand of jigsaw puzzles established 1927

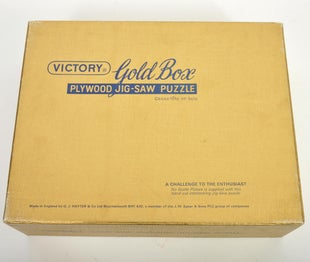
Gold Box Series

Victory was a trademarked brand of plywood jigsaw puzzles, produced by G. J. Hayter & Co.

== History ==
G. J. Hayter & Co Ltd. was founded in the 1920s and was based in Boscombe Bournemouth, England. The company was the manufacturer of plywood jigsaw puzzles named 'Victory' since the early 1920s.

Although the jigsaw puzzle producers like Hayter flourished in the 1930s, through the concept of the weekly jigsaw puzzle, the English Victory puzzles, found in department stores in the 1950s and 1960s, almost completely vanished.

The company became a subsidiary of board game manufacturer J. W. Spears and Sons in 1970. Spears continued the production of plywood jigsaw puzzles and named them “Victory Gold Box Series” up until 1988.

Thousands of Victory puzzles are preserved in private collections.

== Jigsaw Puzzle Series ==
G. J. Hayter & Co issued many series of puzzles, the most common being the Plywood, Popular and Topical series (strip cut), Artistic (strip cut with simple figure pieces), and Super-Cut which were random cut with simple figure pieces and irregular edges.

In all these series, they used the trademarked word "Victory" as part of the name and thus many people today refer to them as "Victory" puzzles.

Sizes of the puzzles varied from smaller, big-pieced puzzles, to large 2000-piece puzzles. Most common puzzles sizes were between 100 and 300 pieces.

Gallery

== List of Series ==
Artistic
Cathedral
Children's
Constructional
English View
Geographical
London View
Plywood (Unnamed/Main Series)
Popular
Super-cut
Topical
Vintage (Early 1930s)

== Gold Box Series ==
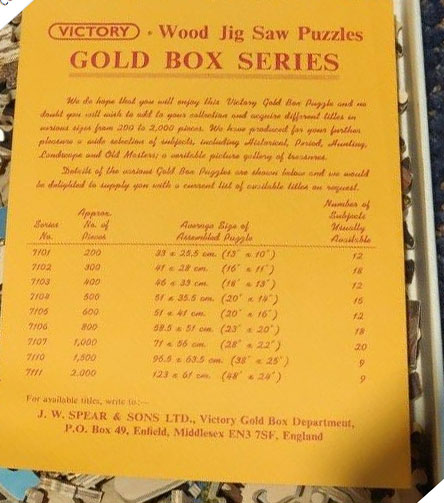
List of Gold Box Series Puzzles

After 1970 and under Spears and Sons management, the company focused on a series based on the older Artistic series, but more loosely cut and packaged in a distinctive gold box. The company eventually dropped the word "Artistic" and simply referred to the series as Gold Box Series. Spears continued producing these puzzles up until 1988.

A characteristic of these puzzles were a number of special cut pieces that had a familiar figure look such as a boat, a plane, a sword, a heart etc. Also, no guide pictures were printed on the box. As quoted on the label: "NO GUIDE PICTURE is provided with this Gold Box VICTORY Jig Saw puzzle. To do so would destroy much of its absorbing interest. The greatest pleasure is derived from not knowing beforehand the subject which the Puzzle will make and then to see the picture gradually form as the pieces are assembled."

In-box puzzle print outs, show that the Gold Box Series numbered a total of 126 puzzles.
