= Brickplayer =

British construction toy

Brickplayer was a British construction toy made by J. W. Spear & Sons of Enfield in North London from 1938 to the mid-1960s. It was advertised with the claim that realistic buildings could be created "with real bricks and mortar". Early post-war kits were designed to build models to 1:27 scale, but from 1949 they were all designed in the same scale as '0' gauge model railways (1:48 scale), and railway stations and signal boxes regularly featured among the models for which instructions were provided. Over time, the arrival and popularity of 'OO' scale and 'HO' scale railways, particularly in the UK the very popular Hornby Dublo sets, and the easy to use Lego type plastic toys saw it disappear by the mid-1960s.

Kits included large numbers of ceramic or terracotta bricks, the largest of which measured one inch in length, half an inch in depth and 0.25 or 0.22 inches in height. They also provided windows, doors, roofing components and a form of cement, together with instructions for building a selection of pre-designed models. Brickplayer owners could also devise and build their own models, and for several years Spears ran a competition for original models, with prizes for the best ones submitted.

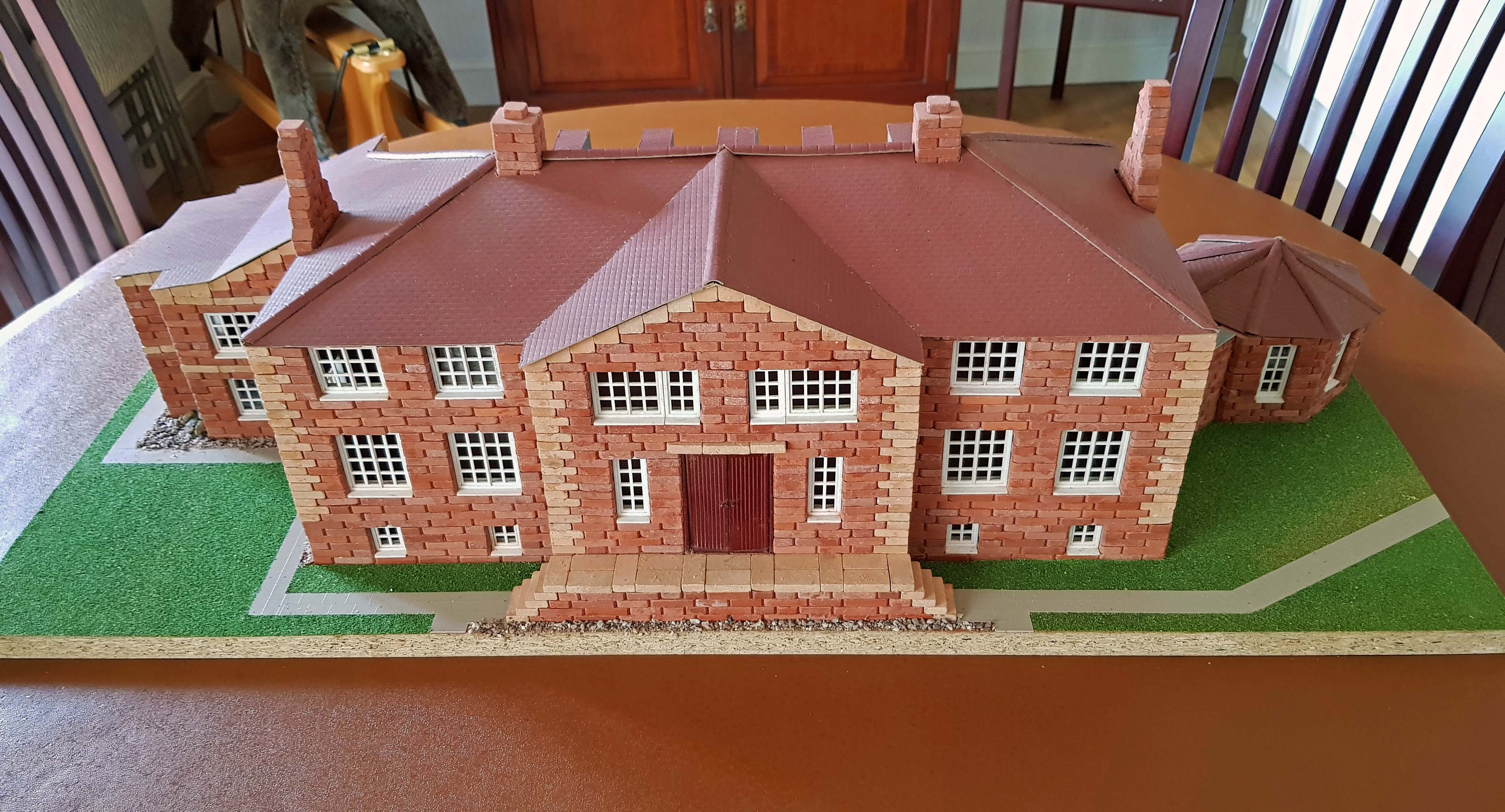
A user-designed model built using components from several Brickplayer kits

Models were not permanent. Although the 'mortar' (a mixture of flour and chalk) made solid models, they could be deconstructed by soaking in water, and the components used again to build another model. Kits provided enough bricks to build any one of the models in the associated instruction book, but never enough to build all the models simultaneously.

Another popular construction toy of the same era was Bayko. Its models could be built more quickly but were less realistic and the system gave less scope for owners to create original structures.

== History ==
=== Pre-War Brickplayer ===
Brickplayer was launched in the UK in 1938, with two sizes of kits referred to as B5 and B7. The larger B7 kit had instructions and materials for building 5 models, while only 3 of these were possible with the B5 kit. Models were quite crude and not designed to a consistent scale. Windows and doors were made of printed cardboard that was cut out and stuck into the relevant spaces between bricks.

Spears' factory was devoted to wartime products during World War II, but these kits were briefly produced again after it ended. Few have survived to the present day.

=== Early Brickplayer ===
In 1947, kits B5 and B7 were withdrawn and two new kits, Kit 1 and Kit 2, were launched. These kits featured several improvements. Metal door and window frames were provided, into which metal door inserts or cut-out window inserts of a perspex like material were stuck. Kits contained instructions and components to build 8 models (Kit 2, or 4 for Kit 1), primarily to the 1:27 scale that was popular with some other models at the time. In these and all later Brickplayer kits, the models were advertised as "architect-designed", and could justifiably claim to be realistic.

These kits were also withdrawn after only two years, but some have survived to the present day.

=== Standard Brickplayer ===
In 1949, Spears launched another pair of redesigned kits, Kit 3 and Kit 4. They contained instructions and components for 12 new models (Kit 4, or 6 for Kit 3), now in 1:48 scale. More realistic windows had glazing bars (mullions and transoms). Kit 4 even had bay windows and splay bricks to create walls with 45 degree angles.

The kits were hugely successful, so that many have survived. Versions were produced exclusively for the American market, with instructions for a set of models more appropriate to American building styles. (Kits 3 and 4 were probably also sold in other countries with the instructions translated - there was certainly an instruction booklet in French.)

Following this success, a Brickplayer Farm kit was marketed in the early 1950s. This was Spears' most ambitious (and most expensive) offering to date. Instructions were given for a range of farm buildings, with the booklet also specifying a layout for placing the full set of models in a realistic farm scene. There were not enough bricks in the Farm kit itself to build all the models, but a separate accessory kit of "2000 Bricks" supplied the necessary extra bricks. It seems to have met with more limited success, and surviving kits are rare.

=== Contemporary Brickplayer ===
1959 saw another redesign, perhaps prompted by waning sales and a sense that the models began to look dated. Contemporary Brickplayer had new bricks, keeping the same basic brick and 1:48 scale but in a paler colour and with sharp corners. Windows were also redesigned and models featured architectural styles that would have looked modern in the 1960s. Three new kits, A, B and C were produced, and at least initially were sold alongside Kits 3 and 4. The largest of the new kits, Kit C, allowed for building 12 models, while only 6 of these could be built with Kit B and 3 with Kit A.

The relaunch appears to have been successful, with many Kits A and B surviving to today (although Kit C is rarer). Nevertheless, the popularity of smaller scales for railway modelling, together with the ease of construction offered by new plastic construction toys meant that Brickplayer ceased production in the mid 1960s.

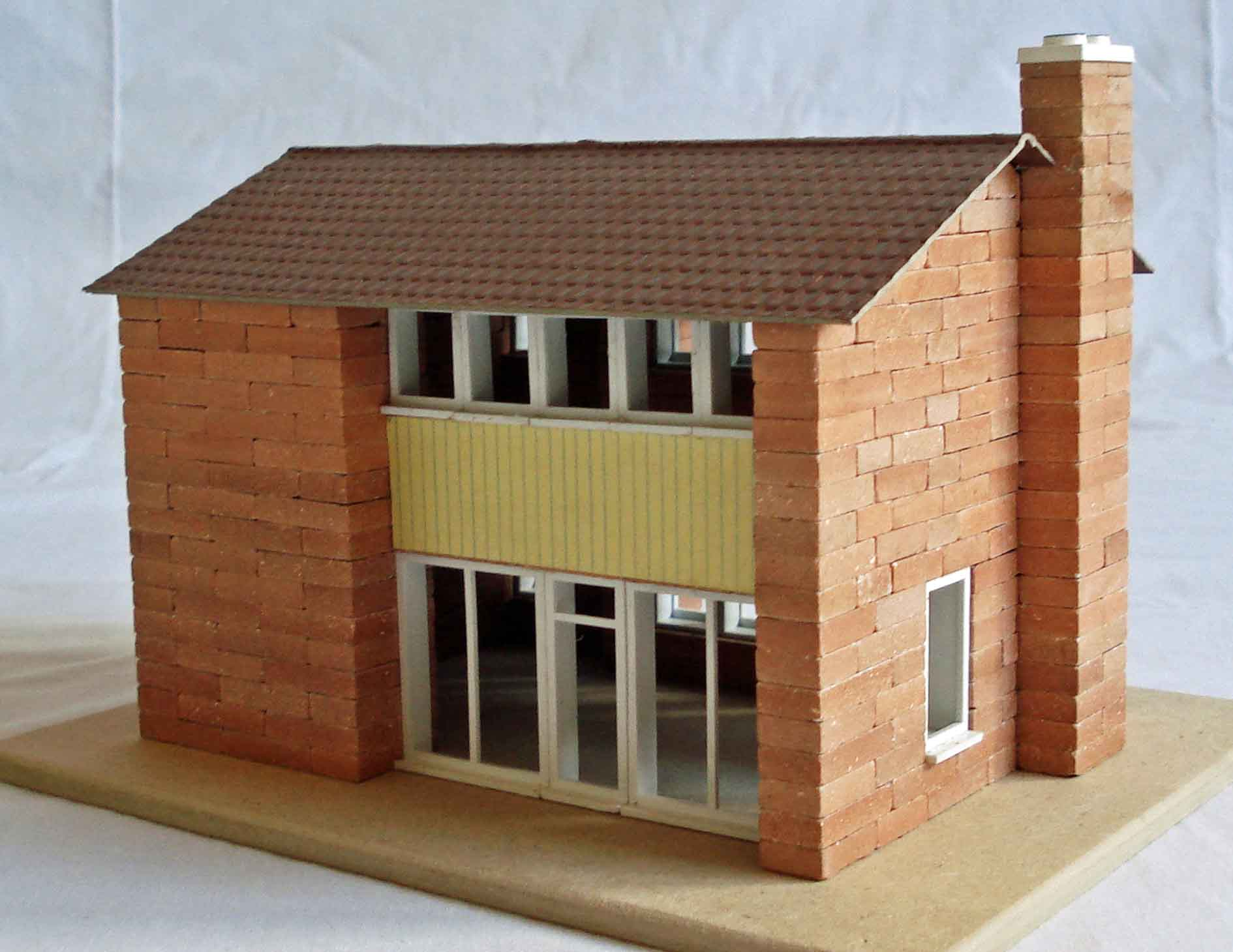
A model built using components and instructions from a Contemporary Brickplayer kit.

When well made, models were very realistic and many high road estate agents (realtors) would place a model or two in their shop windows.
