= Ezy-Bilt =

Ezy-Bilt, invariably styled as EZY-BILT, was an Australian construction kit toy similar to the English Meccano, advertised as "The wonder toy for boys" and marketed in the form of kits:

- No. 1 priced at 2s 6d. in 1931, 86 parts. Local manufacture of toys was given an impetus by high tariffs and primage dues.

By 1941 there were five sets:

Ezy-Bilt manual

- No. 1 of 27 pieces, however defined, for 3s 11d.
- No. 2 of 58 pieces for 6s 11d.
- No. 3 of 90 pieces for 12s 6d.
- No. 4 of 128 pieces for 18s 6d.
- No. 5 of 175 pieces for 26s 6d.

By 1948 the range of kits was extended to No. 8.

It was marketed by Union Manufacturing of 299 Elizabeth Street, Melbourne.

G. J. Coles purchased the Ezy-Bilt business of George Temple Irving (1908–1958) of 318 Flinders Lane, Melbourne, in 1937.

The Ezy-Bilt system bore many similarities to the better-known Meccano, and the company was sued by Meccano for copyright infringement, the case being settled out of court.

Ezy-Bilt sets were manufactured by metal-parts factories in Fitzroy and Melbourne, with rubber wheels made by Barnet Glass and clockwork motors made by Rytime Robilt, another Melbourne company. Manufacture of Ezy-Bilt and other toys ceased in 1941 due to wartime restrictions. Manufacture resumed in 630 Port Road, Beverley, South Australia, subsequently at Southwark, South Australia, by a company associated with Colton, Palmer and Preston.

Ezy-Bilt was finally liquidated in 1984 as a division of Dickson Primer Ltd.
