= Spykee =

Robotic toy

Spykee is a robotic toy made by Erector/Meccano. It contains a USB webcam, microphone and speakers. Controlled by computer locally or over the internet, the owner can move the robot to various locations within range of the local router, take pictures and video, listen to surroundings with the on-board microphone and play sounds/music or various built-in recordings (Robot laugh, laser guns, etc.) through the speaker. Spykee has a WiFi connectivity to let him access the Internet using both ad hoc and infrastructure modes. The electronics inside Spykee were built by a French start-up called WaveStorm.

== Introduction ==
The Spykee robot was conceived in 2006 and began shipping in the United States in late 2008.

== Assembly ==
Spykee is marketed for children ages 8 and up and claims to require 1.5 hours installation time.

== Modifications ==
Spykee is compatible with other Meccano set parts.

At least one owner has modified Spykee to be able to move its "head" (and thus its webcam) up and down.

It is advertised as an open-source robot, although no API or SDK has been officially released. However, an unofficial wiki containing information on how to access Linux on Spykee existed. There is information on how the hardware works and new unofficial firmware, that mainly addresses issues on accessing linux and has the capability of mounting network or USB partitions in linux.

As of May 2010 (possibly earlier), the full source code for the robot firmware, as well as documentation, has been made available.

A home made robot daemon open source project (named Phobos Daemon) is available on spykeewiki as well. The aftermarket daemon supports all the basic functionality of Spykee and has additional features.

As of October 2010, there exists an application to control Spykee from an Android Smartphone. There is also a perl application to control Spykee from for example Linux.
