= Meccano Magazine =

English hobby magazine

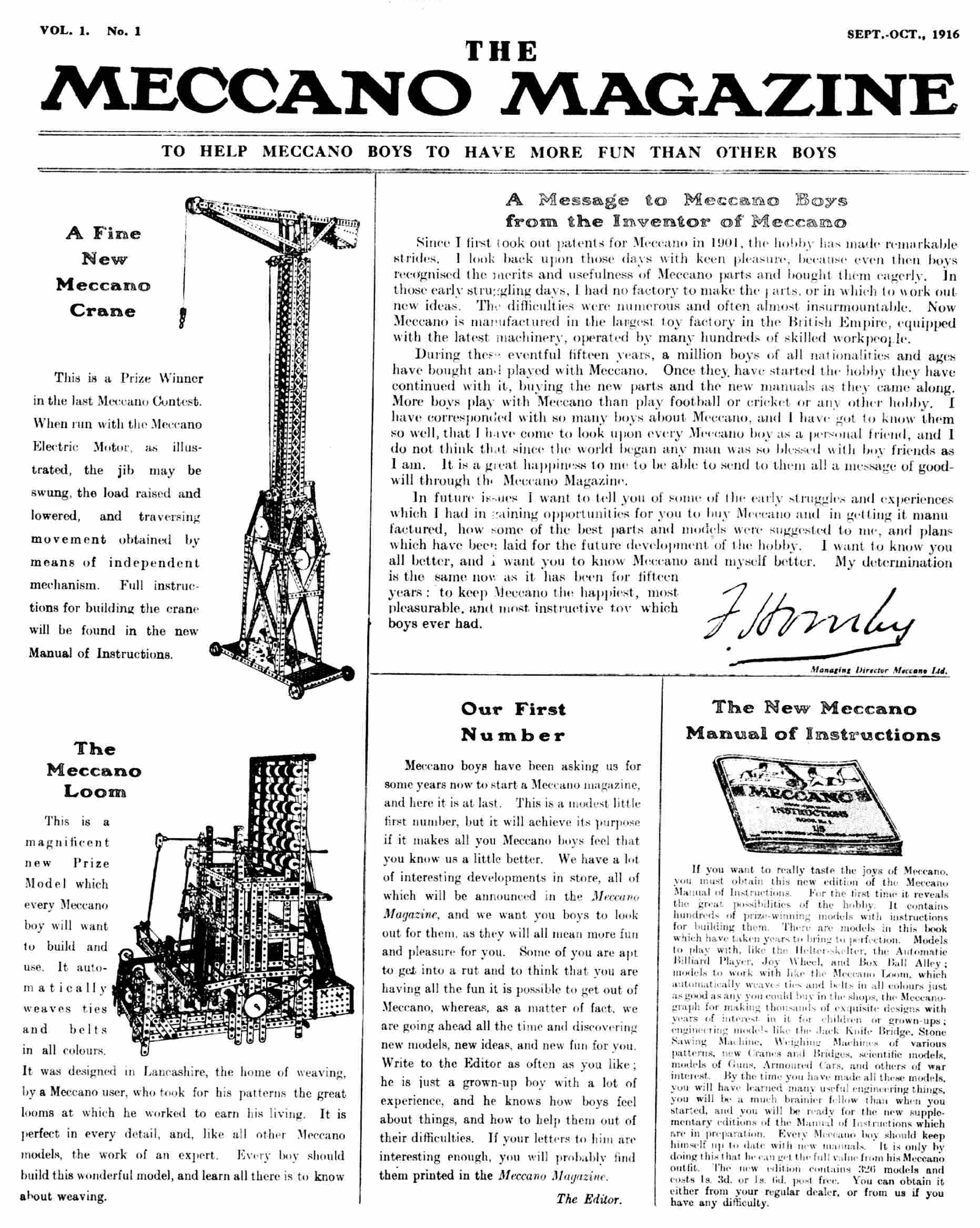
- First issue cover, Sep–Oct 1916, Vol. 1 No. 1.
- Editor: Frank Hornby (first)
- Categories: Hobby
- Frequency: monthly / quarterly
- Circulation: 70,000 / issue (1930s)
- Publisher: Meccano Ltd
- Founded: 1916
- Final issue: 1981
- Company: Meccano Ltd
- Country: England
- Language: English

Meccano Magazine was an English monthly hobby magazine published by Meccano Ltd between 1916 and 1963, and by other publishers between 1963 and 1981. The magazine was initially created for Meccano builders, but it soon became a general hobby magazine aimed at "boys of all ages".

== History ==
The magazine was launched by Frank Hornby, the inventor of Meccano, as a bi-monthly publication in 1916 in the United States as "Meccano Engineer", and was a month ahead of the UK issue. The first copies were given away free but in 1918 readers had to pay two pence for postage for four issues.

In 1917 and again in 1932 Hornby published a history of Meccano, its manufacture, and marketing in the magazine. In 1919 it doubled its size to eight pages and now cost one penny. New Meccano parts were advertised for the first time in 1920 and in 1922 the magazine became a monthly publication. From 1921, the magazine was edited by Ellison Hawks who worked at Meccano as an advertising manager. From the May 1924 issue, the magazine had full-colour covers, and the December 1924 issue was 96 pages, costing six pence. By the 1930s Meccano Magazine had a circulation of 70,000.

During the Second World War the content and quality of the magazine was reduced greatly, and the size decreased from approximately A4 to A5. The A5 pocket-size format remained until 1961 when it was increased again to A4.

In 1963 the magazine started reporting a loss and Meccano Ltd handed its publishing over to its printers, Thomas Skinner. In August 1967 Thomas Skinner terminated production of the magazine and passed the magazine on to Model & Allied Publications (MAP) of Hemel Hempstead in 1968. At the end of 1972 publication stopped due to a decline in popularity.

In April 1973 it was resurrected again, this time as a quarterly magazine, and from 1977 it incorporated Meccano Engineer and the Meccanoman's Journal. Meccano Magazine's last issue was Spring 1981.

== Content ==
Meccano Magazine was originally aimed at Meccano builders and featured articles on Meccano construction and new Meccano developments. When Frank Hornby launched the Meccano Guild in 1919, the magazine carried regular Guild news to keep Meccano clubs informed of each other's activities. But over time Meccano Magazine became a general hobby magazine aimed at "boys of all ages". Aside from Meccano related articles, it also featured Hornby trains, Dinky Toys and other products of Meccano Ltd, plus a wide variety of general interest articles, including, engineering, aircraft, trains, modelling, camping, photography and philately. Commonwealth countries always featured strongly in articles as Meccano Ltd exported its products to these countries.

The magazines today are an excellent source of historic information and an invaluable aid to collectors of toys from those years. They have also become collector's items and there is a healthy trade in them at auctions.
