= School Volunteer Program ACT =

Australian volunteer organization

The School Volunteer Program ACT (SPVACT)
- Founded: 2005
- Location: Australian Capital Territory ACT
- Services: Mentors, Confidants and Communicators
- Method: Volunteering
- Website: https://svpact.org.au/

The School Volunteer program ACT (SVPACT) is a volunteer organization incorporated in the ACT, Australia. Its volunteer members take up roles such as mentors, confidants and communicators to help young students in ACT schools. Volunteers visit schools weekly during each school term. They provide one-on-one time with students in academic related activities such as literacy and numeracy. Mentors also work along with students in other activities such as building with Meccano, woodcraft, Lego, craft, and cooking. Volunteers come from various backgrounds including former teachers, engineers, economists, tradesmen, homemakers, lawyers, bureaucrats and business managers.

== Overview ==
In 1997, a school volunteer program based on a Western Australian program was introduced in Canberra by the Canberra Weston Creek Rotary Club. Later on, the program was combined with two other existing volunteer programs, the School Volunteer trial program of Charnwood Primary School run at that time by St Barnabas Anglican Church, and the "STYLE" program run at that time by the Activities Probus Club of Weston Creek. In the end, the SVPACT which amalgamated all the programs, was launched in October 2005 at North Ainslie Primary School by the Governor General of Australia, Major General Michael Jeffery. It works in partnership with the ACT Directorate of Education and Training.

SVPACT's stated goals, are to connect volunteers who want to make a difference with young people in school who need extra help. It harnesses the wisdom and skills of older generations to enrich the learning experience of young people who are at risk of falling by the wayside in an often overburdened school system.

SVPACT's mission is to prepare and connect inter-generational volunteers with children who have been identified by a school as likely to benefit from engagement with a mature role model.

As of 2016, up to 150 volunteers were providing mentoring services to 40 public schools in the ACT.

== Programs ==
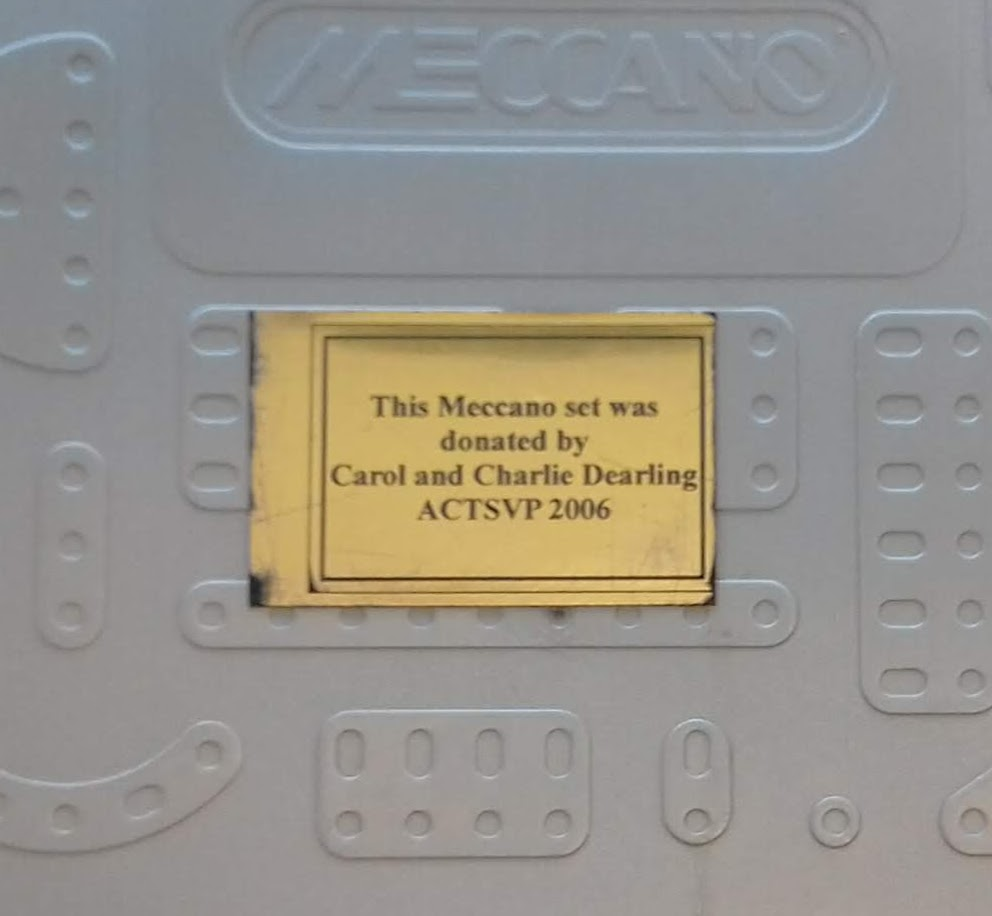
First Meccano set donated by Carol and Charlie Dearling

- Academic Programs: The primary activity of SVPACT is to help students in academic programs such as literacy and numeracy. Volunteers work along with teachers help individuals students to improve their abilities in reading, writing, grammar and math skills.
- Mentoring Using Meccano: In 2005, a request was made by some school principals for volunteers to mentor students who are bright but need help in improving communication or social skills. Carol Dearling, a retired school teacher, suggested using Meccano (a model building kit) for mentoring students, and donated the first Meccano set. This led to the formation of Mentoring Using Meccano project under SVPACT, where the local government and Rotary clubs provided financial support. The program gives students selected by the school staff a chance to spend an hour with an adult mentor while building a model using a Meccano set loaned to them long enough to complete their model, demonstrate the model and then take it apart, place all the pieces back in the case ready to be used by the next student. Where possible, the same mentor is assigned “one-on-one” to a student for the duration of that student's project. A team of four or more students work with their respective mentors in a group environment. During the session, the student gets to communicate with his/her respective mentor, learn to read instructions and construct the chosen model. Upon completion, the student demonstrates the model in the class or Assembly. By the end of the program, the student learns about planning, patience, persistence, and gains dexterity. Completing the project gives the student a sense of accomplishment leading to the building of self-esteem. In some special cases, the program has led to a student being moved up a class or undertaking additional special education for which they previously could not be considered due to lack of communication skills. Mentoring using Meccano became a significant part of SVPACT, helping kids in 35 schools in the ACT. Bob Greeney, who has been leading this program since the beginning, is currently helping in the introduction of the program in other places like Bega, Merimbula, and Pambula.
- Other programs include Lego, woodcraft and cooking.

== Awards ==
SVPACT was named the Volunteer Team of the Year 2015, in the Education, Science, and Technology category.
