= Meccano =

British model construction system

- Product type: Scale model
- Current owner: Spin Master (2013–present)
- Country: England, UK
- Introduced: 1901; 125 years ago
- Previous owners: See list of ownerships
- Website: meccano.com

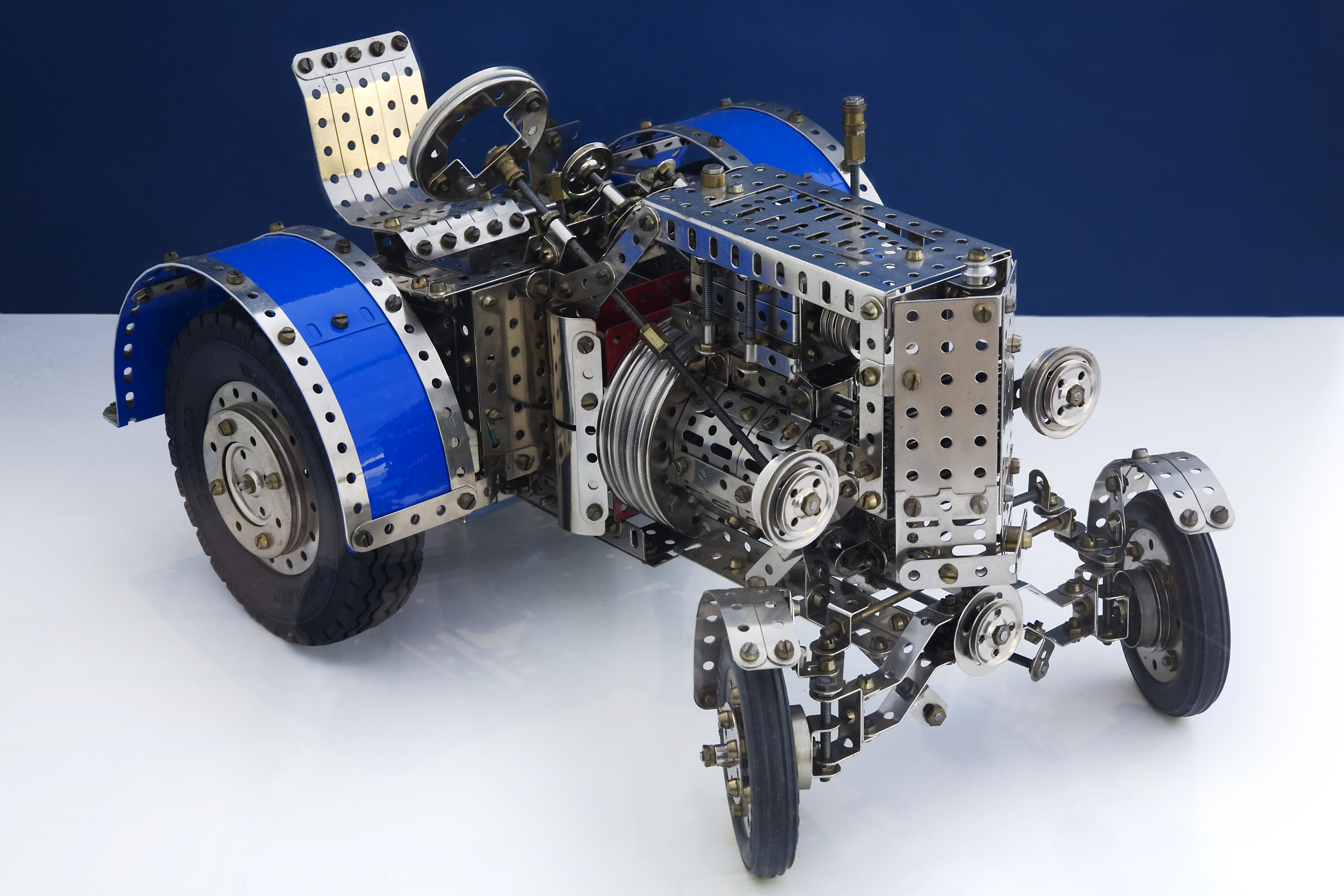
Meccano tractor

Meccano is a British brand of construction set created in 1901 by Frank Hornby in Liverpool, England. The system consists of reusable metal strips, plates, angle girders, wheels, axles and gears, and plastic parts that are connected using nuts and bolts. It enables the building of working models and mechanical devices.

In 1913, a very similar construction set was introduced in the United States under the brand name Erector. In 1990, Meccano bought the Erector brand and unified its presence on all continents. In 2013, the Meccano brand was acquired by the Canadian toy company Spin Master. Meccano maintained a manufacturing facility in Calais, France, until 2023.

== History ==
=== First sets ===
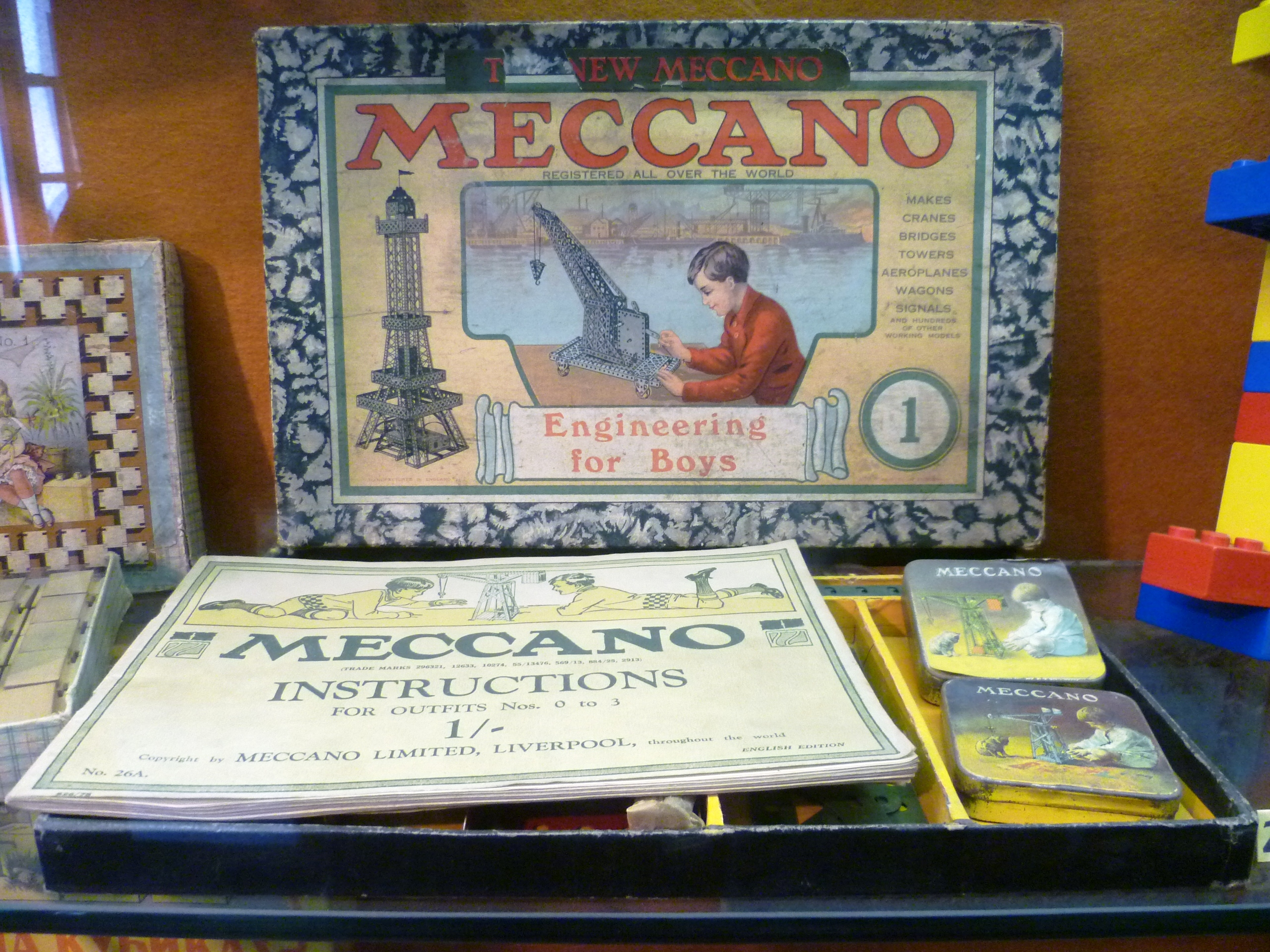
An early Meccano set on display in the Edinburgh Museum of Childhood

In 1901 Frank Hornby, a clerk from Liverpool, England, invented and patented a new toy called "Mechanics Made Easy" that was based on the principles of mechanical engineering. It was a model construction kit consisting of perforated metal strips, plates and girders, with wheels, pulleys, gears, shaft collars and axles for mechanisms and motion, and nuts and bolts and set screws to connect the pieces. The perforations were at a standard 1/2 inch (12.7 mm) spacing, the axles were 8-gauge, and the nuts and bolts used 5/32" BSW threads. The only tools required to assemble models were a screwdriver and spanners (wrenches). It was more than just a toy: it was educational, teaching basic mechanical principles like levers and gearing.

The parts for Hornby's new construction kit were initially supplied by outside manufacturers, but as demand began to exceed supply, Hornby set up his own factory in Duke Street, Liverpool. As the construction kits gained in popularity they soon became known as Meccano and went on sale across the world. In September 1907, Hornby registered the Meccano trademark, and in May 1908, he formed Meccano Ltd. To keep pace with demand, a new Meccano factory was built in Binns Road, Liverpool in 1914, which became Meccano Ltd's headquarters for the next 60 years. Hornby also established Meccano factories in France, Spain and Argentina. The word "Meccano" was thought to have been derived from the phrase "Make and Know".

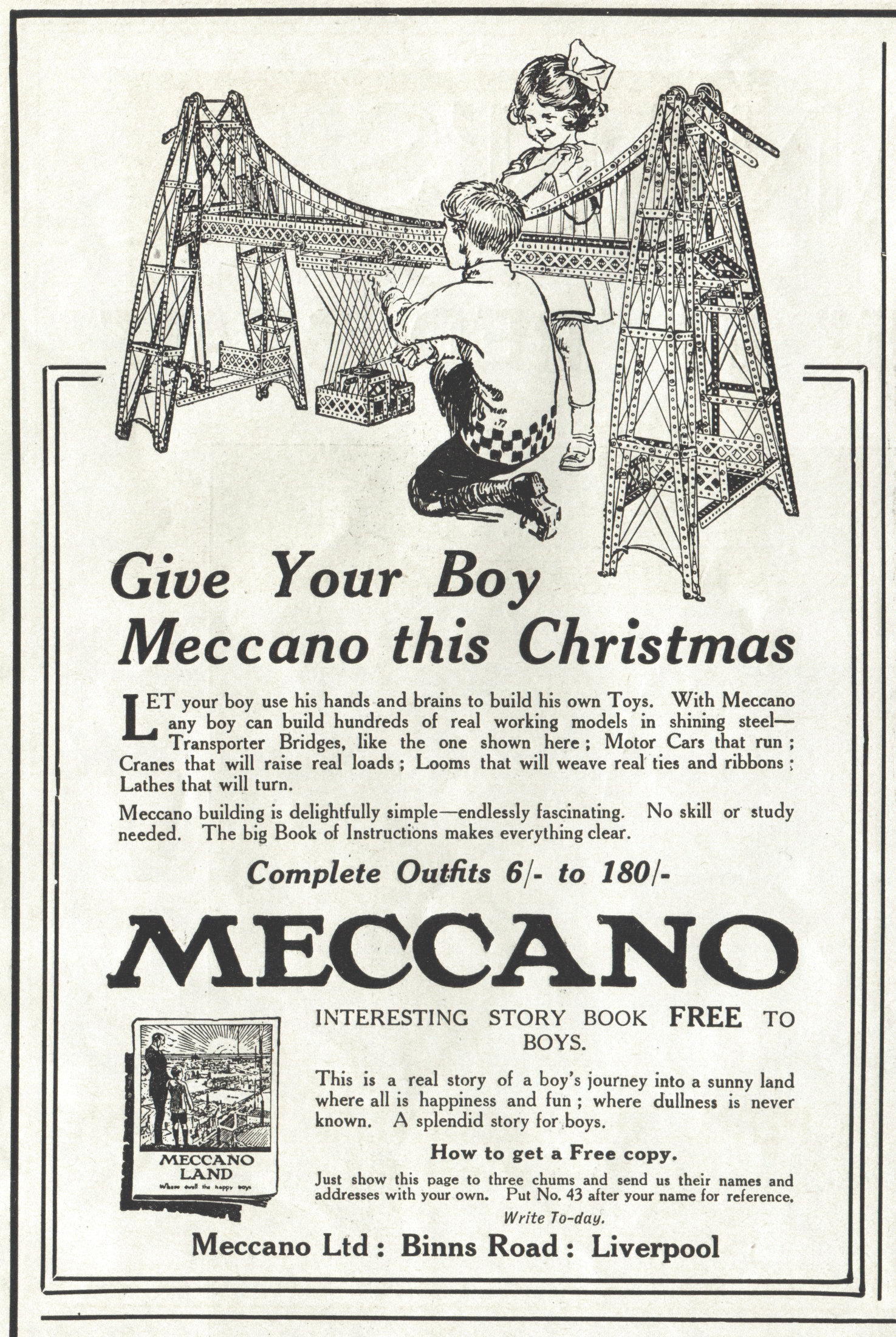
Advertisement in Pears' Annual Christmas, 1920

The first construction sets had parts that were rather crudely made: the metal strips and plates had a tinplate finish, were not rounded at the ends and were not very sturdy. But manufacturing methods were improving all the time and by 1907 the quality and appearance had improved considerably: the metal strips were now made of thicker steel with rounded ends and were nickel-plated, while the wheels and gears were machined from brass.

The first sets under the new Meccano name were numbered 1 to 6. In 1922 the No. 7 Meccano Outfit was introduced, which was the largest set of its day, and the most sought after because of its model building capabilities and prestige.

In 1926, to mark the 25th anniversary of his patent, Hornby introduced "Meccano in Colours" with red and green coloured Meccano pieces. Initially plates were a light red and items like the braced girders were a pea-green. However, the following year strips and girders were painted dark green, the plates Burgundy red, while the wheels and gears remained brass. In 1934, the Meccano pieces changed colour again: the strips and girders became gold while the plates were changed to blue with gold criss-cross lines on them, but only on one side, the reverse remaining plain blue. This new colour scheme was only available in the United Kingdom until the end of the Second World War in 1945. The old red and green sets were still produced for the export market and were re-introduced in the UK after the war.

=== Heyday ===
Instruction book for the 1956 Meccano No. 7 and 8 Outfits, showing a model of a walking drag line excavator built with the red and green Meccano pieces of the time

In 1934, the nine basic Meccano outfits (numbered 00 to 7) were replaced by eleven outfits, labelled 0, A to H, K and L, the old No. 7 Outfit becoming the L Outfit. In 1937, the alphabetical outfit series was replaced by a numeric series, 0 to 10, the L Outfit being replaced by the smaller No. 10 Outfit. Although having fewer pieces than the L Outfit, the No. 10 Outfit became Meccano's flagship set and remained relatively unchanged until it was discontinued a half-century later in 1992. Accessory sets were retained, numbered 1A to 9A, that converted a set to the next in the series (for example, accessory set 6A would convert a No. 6 set to a No. 7 set). As had been the case from early days, Meccano Ltd would also supply individual Meccano parts to complement existing sets.

The Second World War interrupted the production of Meccano in England when the Binns Road factory converted to manufacturing for the war effort. The Korean War in 1950 also disrupted production due to a metal shortage and it was not until the mid-1950s that Meccano production returned to normal with new parts being added to all the sets.

In 1955, outfits 00 to 10 as well as conversion sets 00A to 9A were available.

In 1958, the colours were changed slightly to what became known as 'light red and green' but this incarnation had the shortest lifespan as the colours changed dramatically in 1964 to the black and yellow colour scheme. However, this light red and green period did see the introduction of about 90 new parts, more modern packaging, a new cabinet was introduced for the number 10 set, the first plastic parts were introduced, and the "exploded diagram" instructions made their début.

In 1961, a Mechanisms Outfit and a Gears Outfit were added to the range, and in 1962 outfit 00 was withdrawn.

=== Takeovers ===
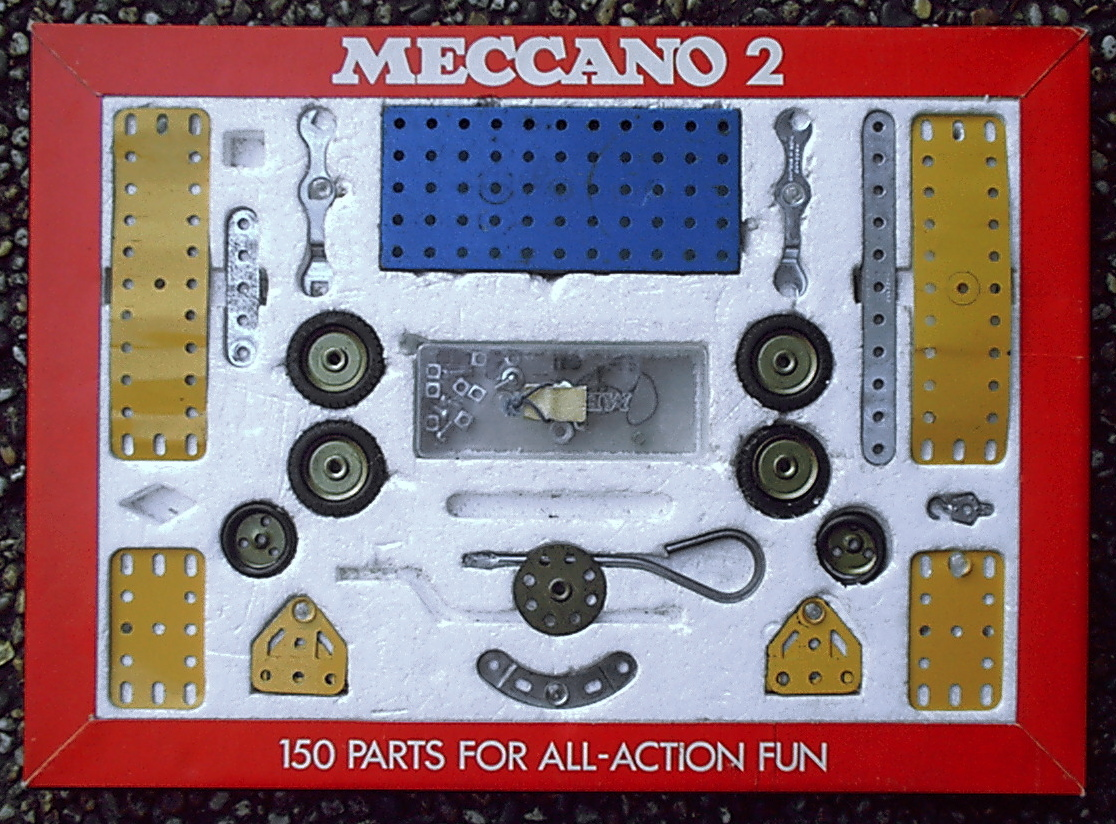
1970s No. 2 Meccano set

In the early 1960s, Meccano Ltd experienced financial problems and was purchased by Lines Bros Ltd (who operated under the brand name "Tri-ang") in 1964. In an attempt to redefine Meccano's image, the colour scheme was changed again, this time to yellow and black plates, with silver strips and girders. The silver was soon replaced by zinc in 1967 when it was found that the silver pieces marked easily. The colours of yellow and black were chosen because they were the colours typically used by most large construction vehicles of the day.

In 1970, electronic parts were introduced, and the current black-coloured plates were changed to blue. The range of sets was reduced by one with the deletion of the old No. 9 set and the renumbering of the old No. 0 to 8 sets to No. 1 to 9. The No. 10 set remained unchanged.

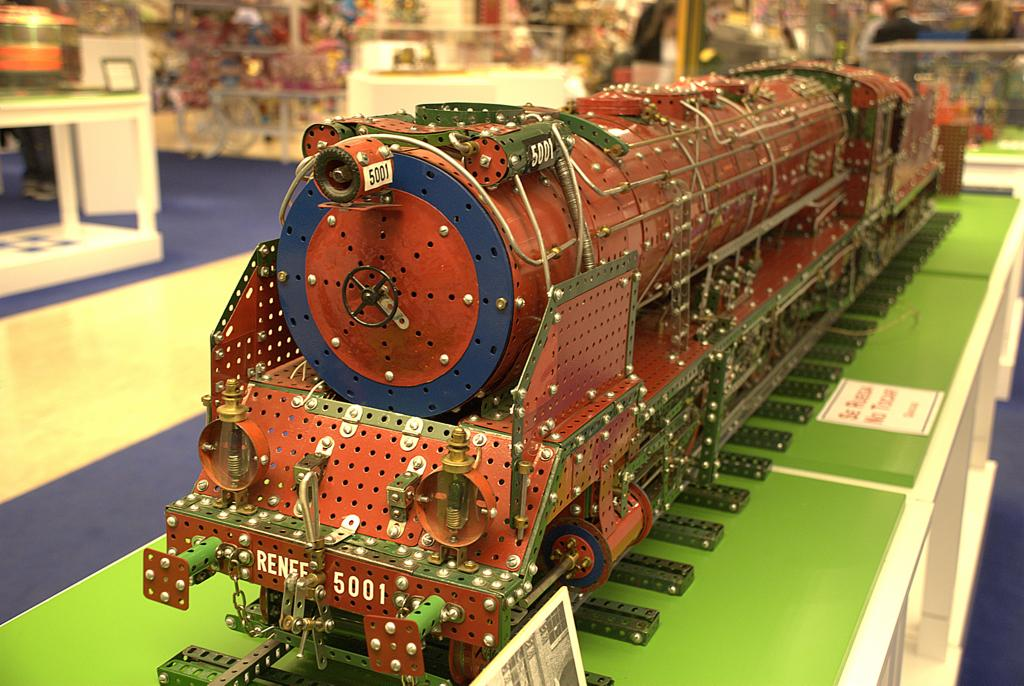
A model steam locomotive built with Meccano

Lines Brothers went into voluntary liquidation in 1971 and Airfix Industries purchased the Meccano business in the UK and General Mills of the US purchased the French business. The French company was known as Miro Meccano. In 1973, outfits 1 to 10 were still available, but new kits were added: Army Multikit, Highway Multikit, Pocket Meccano, and two Clock Kits.

In 1978, the range of Meccano sets was further reduced and changed with the replacement of the No. 2 to 8 sets by six completely new sets, labelled A and 1 to 5. The old No. 9 and 10 sets were left largely unchanged. While some Airfix divisions were profitable, particularly their model kits, they needed to save money. With unions threatening all out industrial action if there were any job losses, Airfix shut down the Binns Road factory, bringing to an end the manufacture of Meccano in England. Meccano still continued to be manufactured in France, as the British and French businesses had different owners.

At the time in the seventies, Meccano France SA launched and produced brand new dark blue MECCANO Construction Kits Set 1 to set 10 Boxes Model Range until the early 1990s. These were also sold in conjunction with the smaller "Complementary Sets CX Series" so that the builders could make more technical and more realistic working models with their own existing normal sets, making it more demanding and harder per kit for the builder or owner as the sequence MECCANO Set 1 TO Set 10 was available.

=== General Mills acquires all rights to Meccano ===
In 1981, General Mills bought up Airfix Products and with it what was left of Meccano Ltd UK, giving it complete control of the Meccano franchise. All the existing Meccano sets were scrapped and a totally new range of sets were designed for production in Calais, France called "Meccano Junior", a new product range consisting of plastic construction kits with tools included, although these new sets would only allow the young builder to make small models.

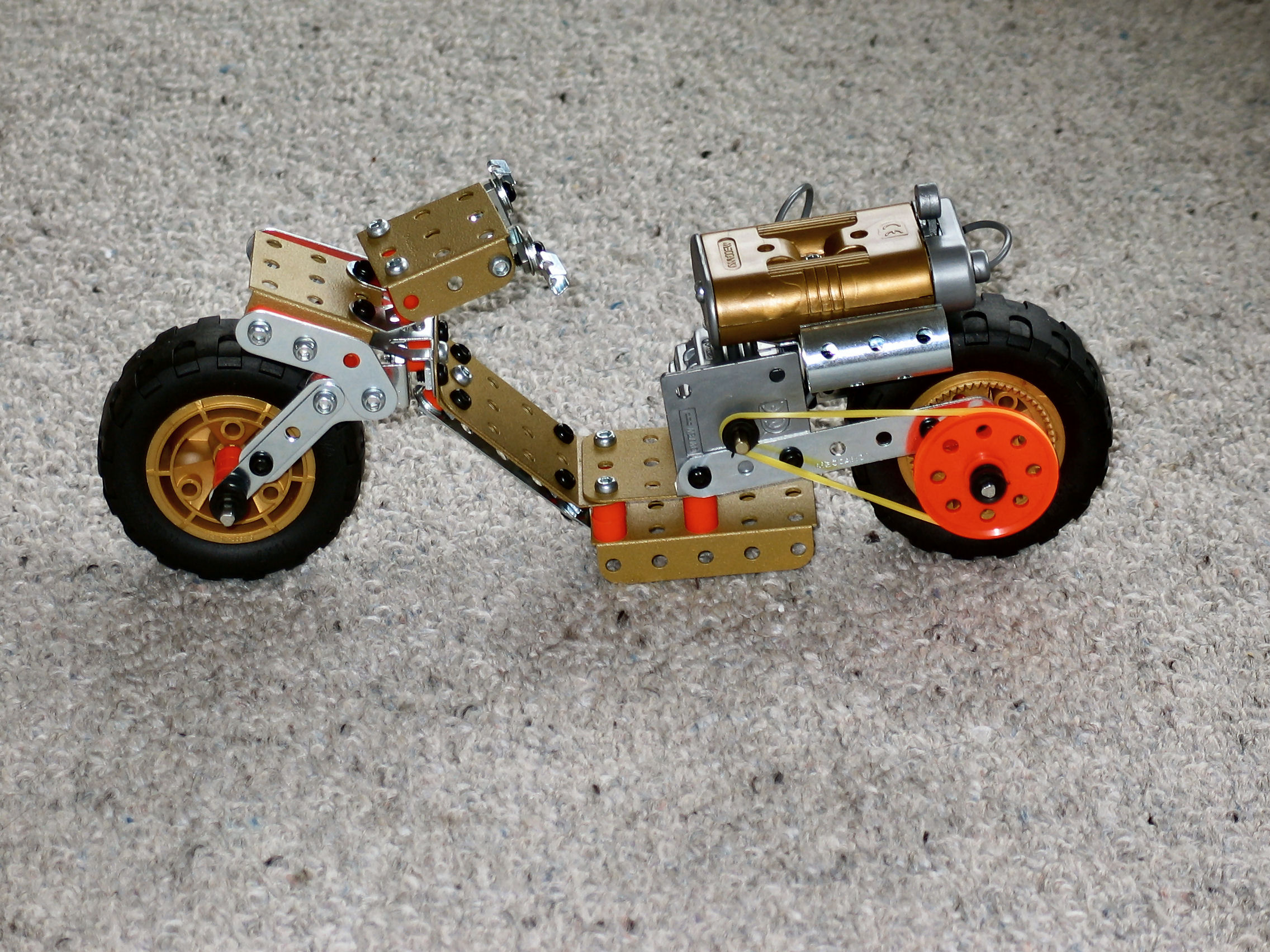
Meccano model motorcycle built with the Meccano Motion System 50 set

=== Meccano becomes independent ===
In 1985, General Mills left the toy business completely, selling off their toy divisions. Meccano was sold to a French accountant, Marc Rebibo, and once again all existing Meccano sets were scrapped. The "Meccano Junior" sets were replaced by three "Premier Meccano" sets, and two "Motor" sets (including a six-speed motor) were introduced. Due to high demand, the old Meccano No.1 to No.10 construction sets from 1981 were re-introduced.

In 1989, Marc Rebibo sold what remained of Meccano to Dominique Duvauchelle. Allen head zinc-plated steel bolts replaced the original slot-headed brass-plated bolts and the "Plastic Meccano Junior" sets were brought back. With younger model builders in mind, many theme sets were also introduced, including the "Construction and Agricultural" 200-Series & 300-Series, the "Space" 100-Series, and the "Dynamic" 400-Series minisets. The old-style No. 5 to 10 sets remained in production until 1992.

In 1994, additional theme sets were introduced and a pull-back friction motor was added to the Plastic Meccano System. In 1996, "Action Control" sets with infrared controls were added and 1999 saw the introduction of a "Motion System" range of sets that changed the look of Meccano completely. There were six one-model sets, two five-model sets, and five new sets numbered 10 to 50, the 20 to 50 sets being motorised. In a complete change from the normal practice of sticking to a single major colour, every set was given its own colour scheme, often in bright neon colours.

In 2000, Nikko, a Japanese toy manufacturer, purchased 49 per cent of Meccano and took on its marketing internationally through its established channels for radio-controlled toys. Development and design remained with Meccano SN, based in Calais, France. Nikko launched a successful range of new sets, including "Crazy Inventors" and the "Future Master" range. Significantly, Nikko radio control and programmable electronics started to appear in the System. However, under commercial pressure, Nikko sold its interest in the Meccano name and System back to Meccano SN, the French parent company, in August 2007. During 2013, the Meccano brand was acquired in its entirety by the Canadian toy company Spin Master.

=== Spin Master era ===
In 2013, Canadian toy company Spin Master acquired Meccano. It launched "Meccano Evolution", a new "back to basics" iteration of Meccano, which allowed smaller and more detailed models to be built using simpler and more "functional" parts than were supplied in previous "new Meccano" sets. Meccano Evolution has narrower strips, with holes spaced at twice the density of the original system. In late 2013, the company also opened a public "Meccano Lab" play space and R&D centre, in Calais, France.

In 2015, Spin Master launched Meccanoids, Meccano modular robots.

In February 2023, Spin Master said the Calais factory would close as it was still losing money. The factory closed on 31 October 2023.

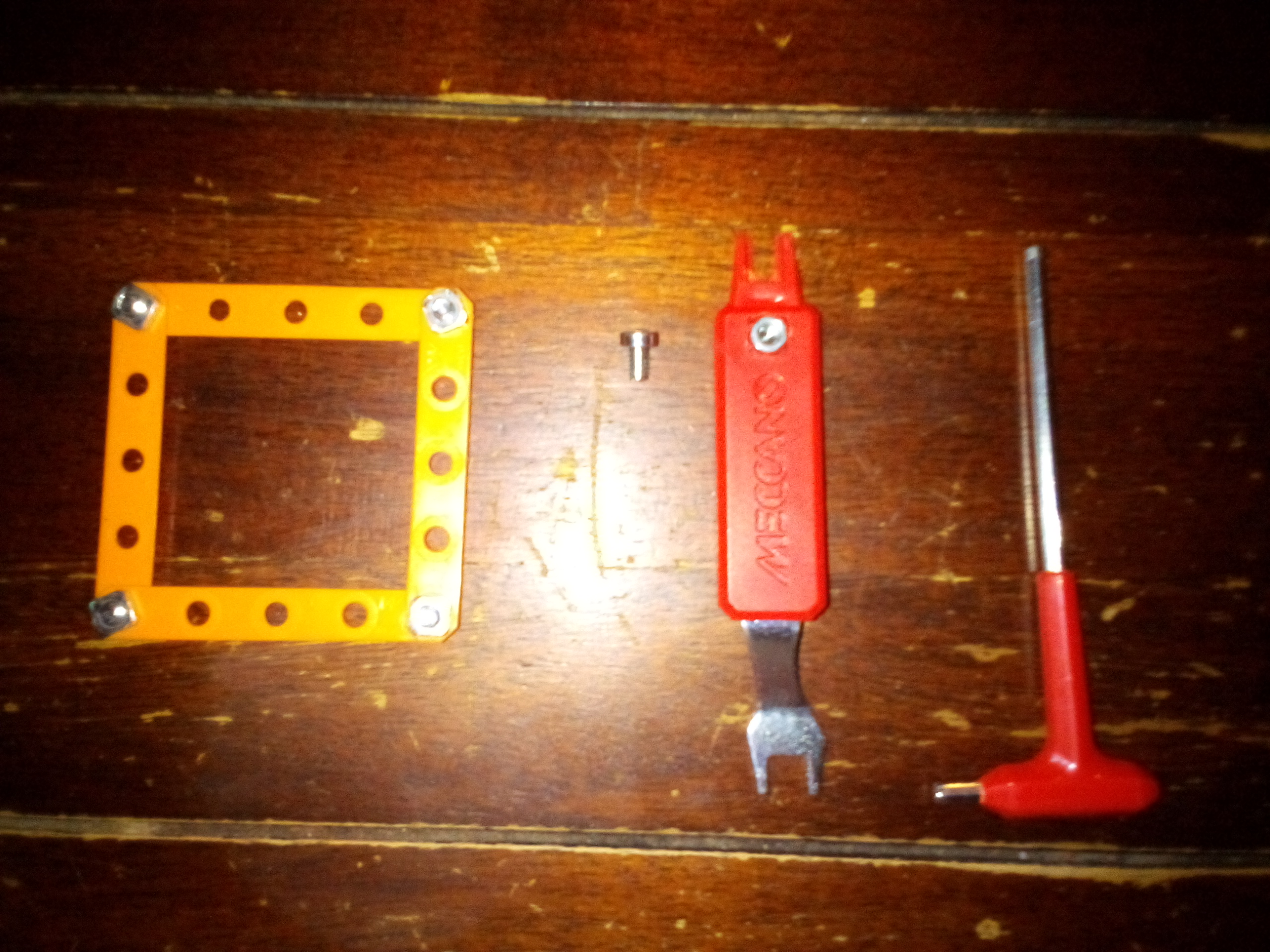
Modern Meccano and its tools

Meccano was by now very different from its heyday in the 1930s to 1950s. The target market of youngsters has not changed significantly; however, the mass market, instant-appeal approach does not always satisfy serious Meccano enthusiasts. For example, it is often difficult to obtain original spares.

Many parts were introduced since the Liverpool factory closed under the French-and-Japanese running of the company. These included plastic parts, can motors, and modern battery holders. Metal became an expensive raw material to work with and many of the metal parts were replaced with plastic parts. Allen (hex-headed) zinc electroplated steel bolts replaced the slotted bolts.

Original specialist parts, such as very long (up to 2-foot (0.6 m)) angle girders, loom shuttles, printing rollers, etc. often required for large Super Models are becoming more difficult to obtain. There are replica manufacturers who satisfy the needs of enthusiasts who wish to build models requiring these parts.

What has remained the same during all these years is the Imperial 1/2 inch (12.7 mm) perforation spacing and the 5/32" whitworth thread for nuts and bolts (and other threaded parts). These unchanged standards and complete interchangeability of parts results in many modern models functioning perfectly with Meccano components that are more than 100 years old and vice versa. Indeed, old and new parts can be intermixed with impunity, the only problem being the odd mixture of colour schemes.

In January 2025, Spin Master announced it was licensing Meccano to British toy company Addo Play under a long-term agreement. Addo Play has agreed to develop, design and manufacture a refreshed line-up of Meccano products. These will include play-sets, junior products and collaborations.

== Components ==
With a Meccano set there was a wide range of models that could be built. Here are the models for which instructions were given in the largest set of the late 1950s, the "Outfit 10":

"Railway Service Crane", "Sports Motor Car", "Coal Tipper", "Cargo Ship", "Double Decker Bus", "Lifting Shovel", "Blocksetting Crane", "Beam Bridge", "Dumper Truck", "Automatic Gantry Crane", "Automatic Snow Loader", "4-4-0 Passenger Locomotive"

On top of these there were instruction leaflets available for:

"Combine Harvester", "The Eiffel Tower", "Showman's Traction Engine", "Twin-Cylinder Motor Cycle Engine", "Trench Digger", "Bottom Dump Truck", "Road Surfacing Machine", "Mechanical Loading Shovel"

The instructions sometimes contained errors, which caused difficulty for small children.

Since this time, enthusiasts such as G. Maurice Morris and MW Models have taken to publishing their own model plans, ranging from small models up to large and complex machines.

=== Motors ===
The current range of Meccano electric motors consists of small DC types designed to run on domestic batteries. These are low-torque high-speed "can" motors. These are inexpensive and suitable for small models that a child might construct from the standard range of sets. Adult enthusiasts tend to use a wider range of high-performance motors that are better suited to powering large models. During Meccano's heyday, the electric motors available were universal wound (for use on DC or AC supplies) that were called the MECCANO MOTOR M-Series in the 1970s; these electric motors ranged from 3 volt to the E20R 20 volt Electric Reversible Motor depending on the motor model. They became better known as the M1, M3 and M5 Electric Motors. Particularly well known were the E020, E20R and E15R universal motors, issued after the Second World War.

These could be run from a mains Meccano Transformer No.T20 (1 amp 20 volts) set or, in the case of the E15R, a 12 V car battery. Earlier there had been short-lived (and potentially lethal) mains motors designed for DC mains with a domestic lightbulb in series to limit the current, followed by motors of the post-War pattern but wound for 4.5 or 6 V DC and suited to lead/acid accumulator power. These, as well as the latter accumulator are now rare if in good condition.

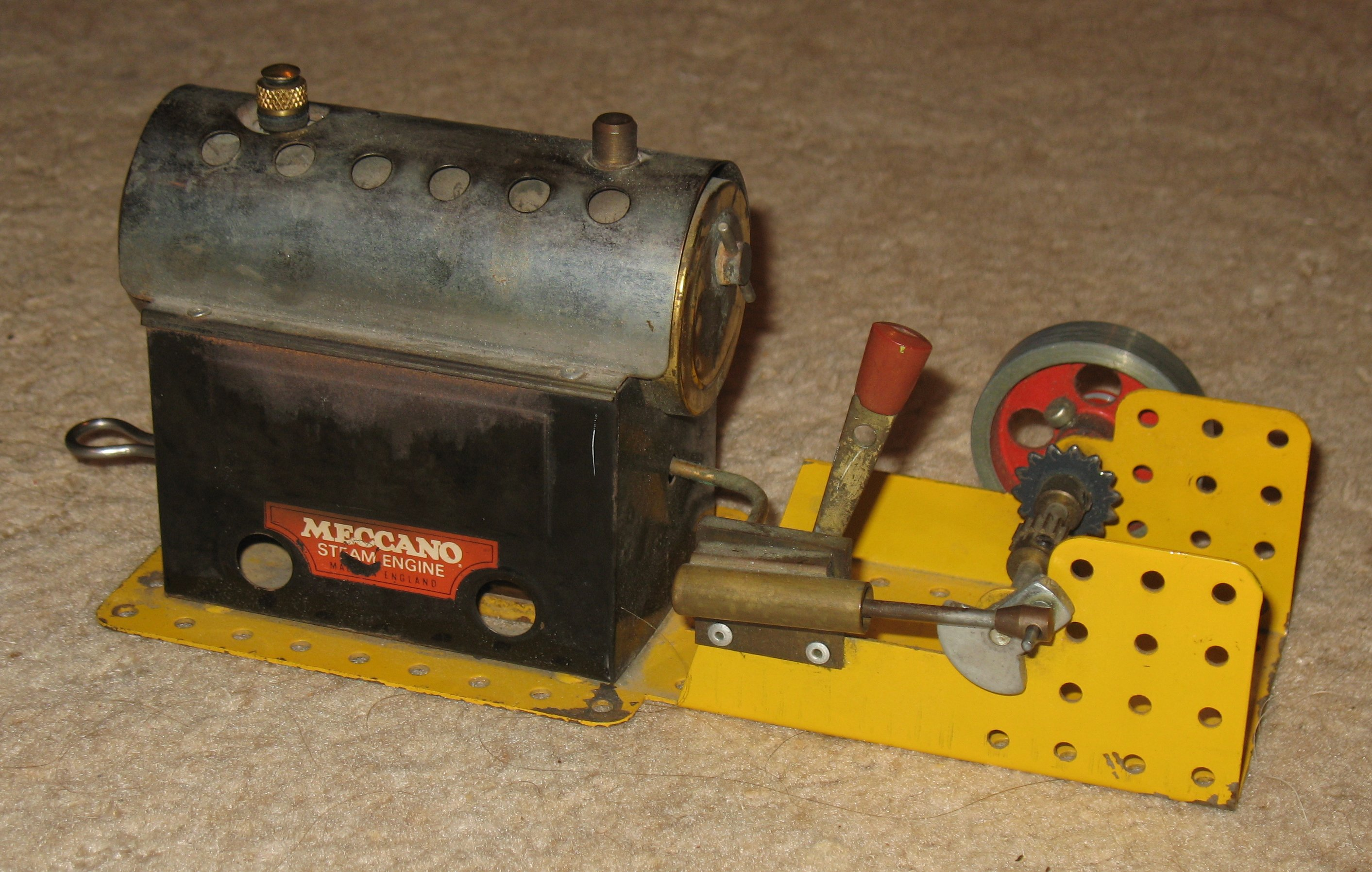
A Mamod-made Meccano steam engine, 1965–1979

For many years, live steam engines were made and sold under the Meccano brand, although they were not made by Meccano. Earlier examples were just vertical steam engines, typical of the time, sold under the Meccano name. The first to be specially designed for Meccano was introduced in 1929. This was a vertically boilered engine in a chassis designed to facilitate it being integrated into Meccano models.

From 1965 to 1976, Mamod made a steam engine for Meccano, the design of which was based on the 1929 version, with a similar chassis but using a standard Mamod horizontal boiler and engine parts. The model had no official model number, being known simply as the Meccano steam engine. However, it has since become generally known as the MEC1. Even after it was no longer being sold under the Meccano name, Mamod continued to manufacture the same model (with minor differences) until 1985, under their own name with the model number SP3.

There were also at least three different clockwork motors sold under the Meccano brand name ("Magic", No.1 and No.2). The No.2 motor was made for Meccano by Märklin in Germany.

== Compatible kits ==
Some model construction kits are compatible with Meccano. One example is the Swiss brand Stokys, which has been manufactured since 1941. Their elements are mainly made of thick stable metal in order to fit to the general approach of Swiss Quality. Other examples are Exacto and Metallus (construction kits).

Meccano has always had several compatible products on the market (such as X-Series Meccano, Plastic Meccano, Mogul Toys and Speed-Play). In 2007, a plastic robot named "Spykee" arrived. The robot is controlled using a WiFi interface and has a webcam but cannot climb stairs as is sometimes claimed. It can also be controlled over the Internet and configured as a security camera. The robot is primarily packaged in a single plastic base component and comprises additional bolt-on plastic parts that are present for aesthetic purposes only (i.e. the arms do not function). The robot base does include some standard Meccano hole spacing. By September 2008, the Spykee robot family numbers five, with each robot having different capabilities.

Since the 1920s, construction kits compatible with Meccano were manufactured in the Soviet Union. They did not have a uniform colour scheme, parts could be in any colour. Usually the strips and girders were not painted, and the plates could be either unpainted or painted in red, yellow, and blue. In the 1970s, plastic parts were introduced. The Krugozor (Russian: Кругозор, "Outlook") plant in Moscow produced some sets which included electrical motors and gears. The largest set of the 1970s–1980s was called Yunost-3 (Russian: Юность-3, "Adolescence-3") and contained about 200 parts. The Yunost ("Adolescence") series were practically identical to Meccano sets with the same number, but there is no evidence of larger sets (equivalent to No. 4 or larger) being produced. There were instructions for building 44 models. Today, many similar kits, mostly Russian and Chinese-produced, are being sold in Russia.

Unlike the Czech Merkur sets, the Soviet ones used mixed Metric and Imperial measurements despite the latter having been abandoned in Russia since the 1920s. The spacing between holes was 1/2 inch (12.7 mm) and the hole diameter was 1/6 inch (4.3 mm), but the nuts and bolts included were metric.

From the mid-1910s, in the US, there was a system called Erector, invented by A. C. Gilbert. Erector was largely compatible with Meccano. Gilbert died in 1961, and the company went into decline, filing for bankruptcy in 1967. After several changes of ownership, in 2000, Meccano bought the Erector brand and unified its presence on all continents.

A similar system Ezy-Bilt was manufactured and marketed in Australia 1931–1984.

== Other applications ==
Meccano may be used to present challenges similarly to straightedge and compass construction, such as this regular heptagon constructed with only 15 Meccano strips with bar sizes of 9 and 12 holes.

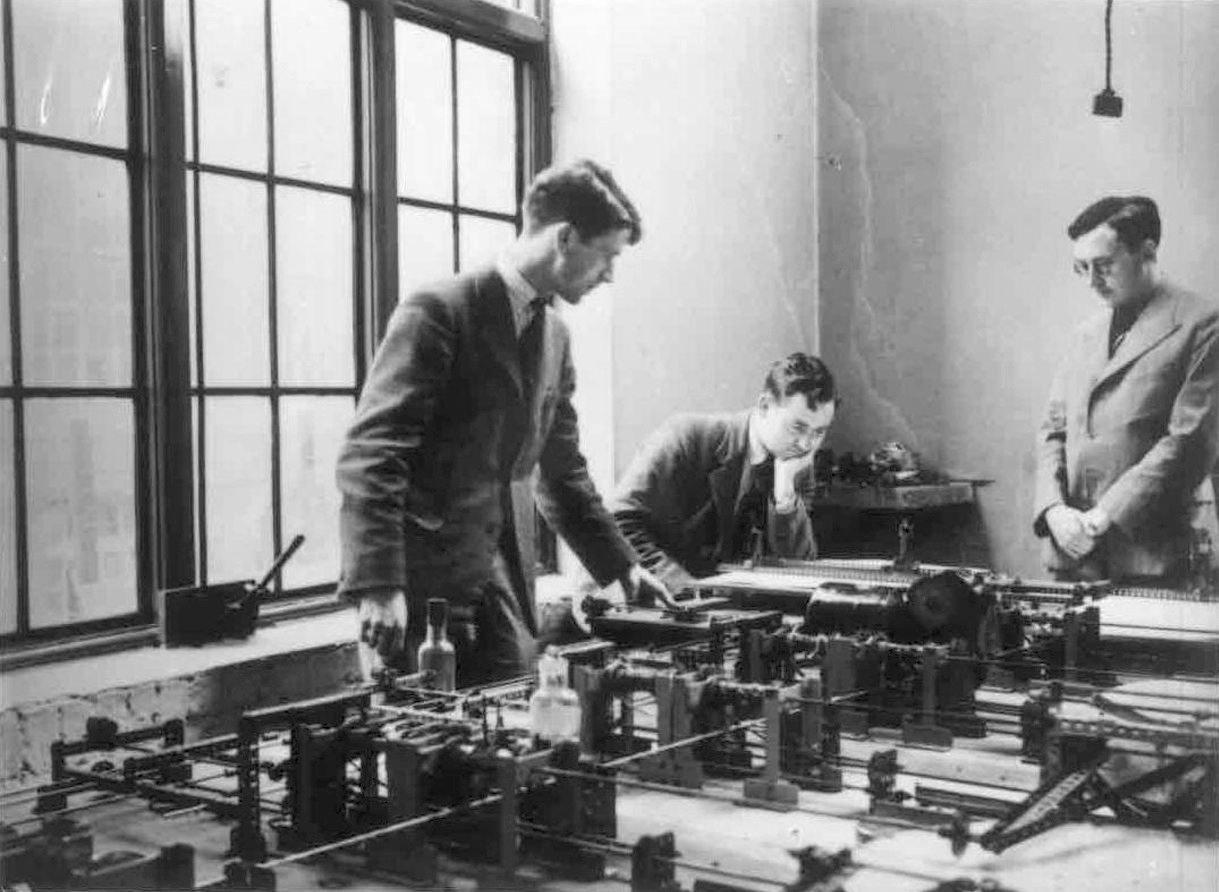
Museum of Transport & Technology's Meccano differential analyser in use at the University of Cambridge Mathematical Laboratory, c. 1937. The person on the right is Maurice Wilkes, who was in charge of it at the time.

In 1934, Meccano began to be used in the construction of differential analysers, a type of analogue computer used to solve differential equations using methods which have since been superseded by the digital computer. Though invented on paper in the 19th century, the first such machine had only been built in 1931, and normally they would be built by specialist manufacturers, at great cost.

For example, in 1947, UCLA in the US installed a differential analyser built for them by General Electric at a cost of $125,000. However, a "proof of concept" model of a differential analyser which made extensive use of Meccano parts was built at Manchester University, England, in 1934, by Douglas Hartree and Arthur Porter: use of Meccano meant that the machine was cheap to build, and it proved "accurate enough for the solution of many scientific problems". This machine is now in the Science Museum in London.

A similar machine built by J. B. Bratt at Cambridge University in 1935 is now in the Museum of Transport & Technology collection in Auckland, New Zealand. After a lengthy period of neglect, a restoration effort began in 2003, and a successful "full run through" of this machine was completed on 16 December 2008.

A memorandum written for the British military's Armament Research Department in 1944 describes how this same machine was modified during the Second World War for improved reliability and enhanced capability, and identifies its wartime applications as including research on the flow of heat, explosive detonations, and simulations of transmission lines.

The memorandum is now in The National Archives, UK. It has been said that this machine was used in preparation for Operation Chastise, otherwise known as the "Dam Busters raid"; However, after extensive enquiries and literature searches over the last few years, no evidence can be found that the Differential Analyser no. 2, nor any other differential analyser, was used for this purpose.

In 1949, an Erector set was used to build the precursor to the modern artificial heart by William Sewell and William Glenn of the Yale School of Medicine. The external pump successfully bypassed the heart of a dog for more than an hour.

In the 1970s, information theory pioneer Claude Shannon constructed a bounce-juggling machine from an Erector set.

In the late 1980s, with an Erector Set, various old toys, and bits of jewellery, Jack Kevorkian jury-rigged a machine he called the Thanatron (later renamed to the Mercitron.) Three bottles were suspended from a beam: one filled with a saline solution to open a patient's veins, another with barbiturates for sedation, and a third with potassium chloride to stop the heart. The concept was that the doctor connected the patient to an IV, and the patient would pull a chain on the device to start the lethal medications flowing. He called it his "Rube Goldberg suicide device".

In 2005, Tim Robinson displayed his own Meccano differential analyser at the Computer History Museum, at Mountain View, California, US, and Robinson has also built and exhibited two models of Charles Babbage's difference engine, also using Meccano.

In 1990 Meccano S.A. built a giant Ferris wheel in France. It was modelled after the original 1893 Ferris Wheel built by George Washington Gale Ferris Jr. at the World's Columbian Exposition at Chicago and was shipped to the United States to promote "Erector Meccano" after Meccano S.A. had bought out the "Erector" trade name and began selling Meccano sets in the U.S. It went on display in New York City after which it was purchased by Ripley's Believe It or Not! and put on display in their St. Augustine, Florida museum. The model, the largest at the time, was 6.5 metres (21 feet) high, weighs 544 kilograms (1,199 pounds), was made from 19,507 pieces, 50,560 nuts and bolts, and took 1,239 hours to construct. At this mass and size, some deviation from Meccano-only parts was a necessity, to prevent it collapsing (mainly in the structural spokes). The largest model by mass would certainly be in contention but some models have topped 600 kilograms (1,300 lb).

In the late 1990s, engineer Mark Sumner utilised Erector to create a working model for "Soarin'", an attraction at Disney's California Adventure in Anaheim, California and Walt Disney World's Epcot near Orlando, Florida.

A large model, weighing approximately 500 kilograms (1,100 lb) and 23 metres (75 ft) long, was built in September 2009 by TV presenter James May and a team of volunteers from the engineering department of the University of Liverpool, who created a Meccano bridge spanning the Leeds & Liverpool Canal in Liverpool. The bridge was engineered by Hayden Nuttall and Adam Miller of the engineering firm Atkins, who won the chance via a Dragon's Den type pitch to James, former politician Edwina Currie and a professional bridge engineer. As with other models of this size and weight some non-Meccano parts were used. It was built from "[about] 100,000 pieces of real Meccano", taking 1,100 hours, and consisted of a 9-metre (30-foot) "swing bridge" section, and a 12-metre (39-foot) "drawbridge" section. A contender for the largest model on record was built in 2014 by Graham Shepherd of Grahamstown, South Africa. The fully motorised Krupp 288 Bucket Wheel Excavator (as used on large opencast mining) is complete with auxiliary conveyors. Construction utilised Meccano parts as well as replica and strengthened parts (thickened profile plates and high tensile bolts in areas carrying large loads). Shepherd reports the model as being 1,335 kilograms (2,943 pounds) in mass and 5.2 metres (17 ft) tall. It required substantial timber support frames to facilitate final assembly.

Meccano and Erector remain versatile constructional mediums. Many mechanical devices can be built with these systems, from structures, to complex working cranes, automatic gearboxes or clocks.

== Popularity and influence ==
Meccano Centennial poster and sticker issued in 2001 to celebrate one hundred years of Meccano, showing the Meccano block-setting crane with a portrait of Frank Hornby, Meccano's inventor

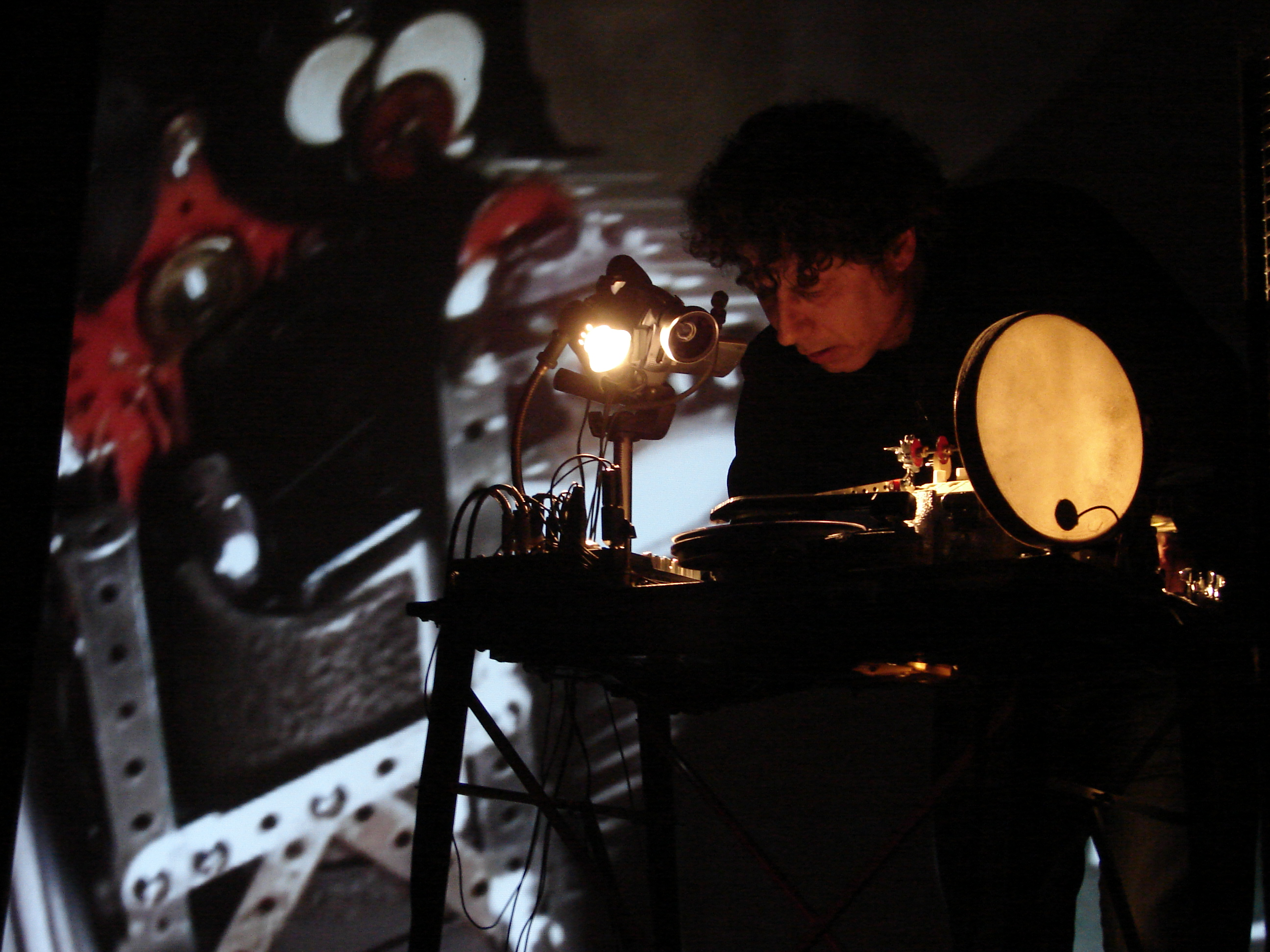
Pierre Bastien with his instruments made from Meccano

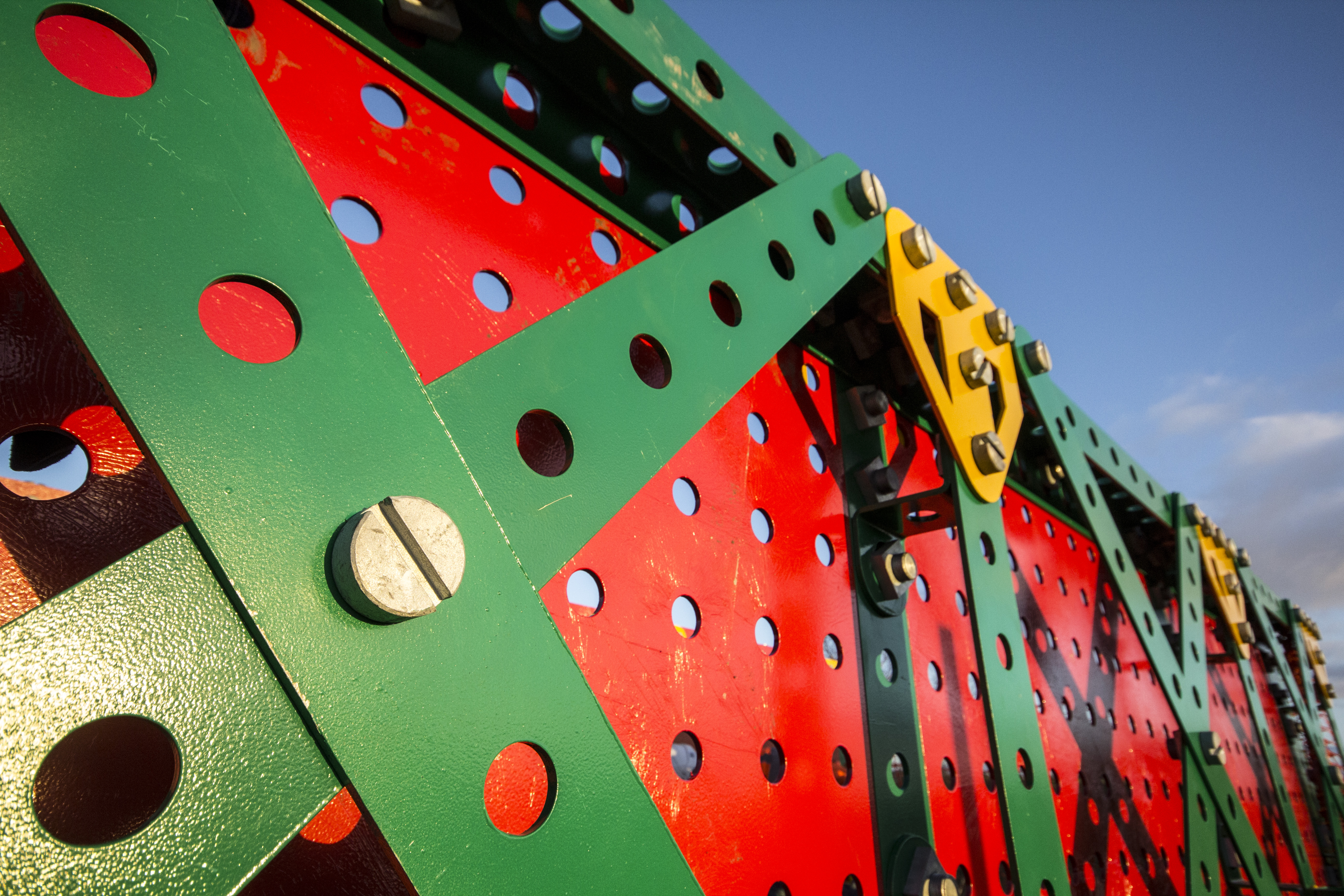
Footbridge over the Manchester, Bolton and Bury Canal at Nob End, made of 10:1 scale Meccano

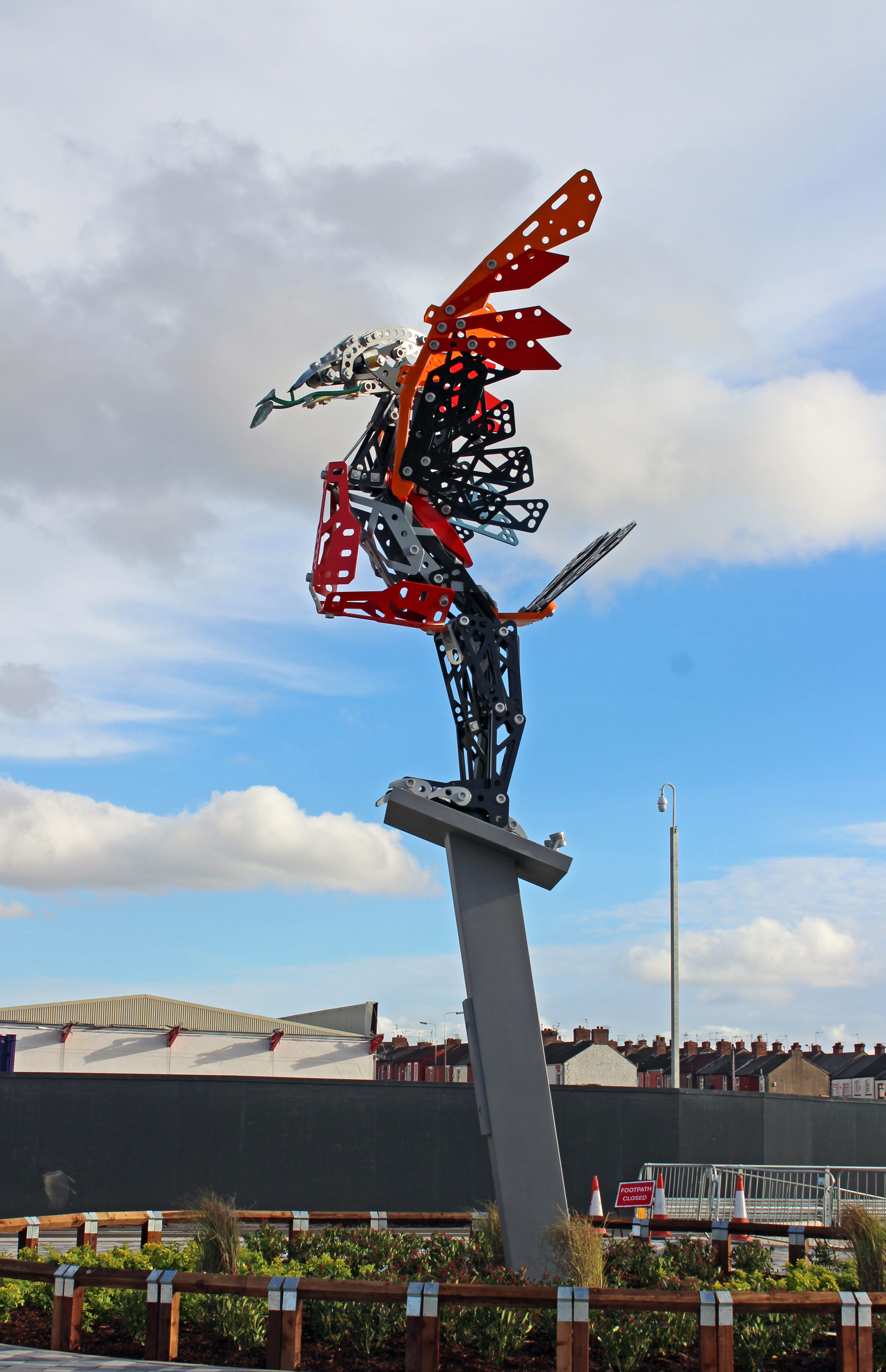
Liver bird sculpted to resemble Meccano at Liverpool Shopping Park, on the site of the former Meccano factory on Binns Road

Frank Hornby launched the Meccano Guild in 1919, to encourage boys of all ages—as well as early clubs—to become part of a central organisation, which oversaw club formation, and set guidelines for club proceedings. The Meccano Magazine was used as a means to keep Guild clubs informed of each other's activities (as well as encourage the sales of Meccano).

The International Society of Meccanomen was founded in 1989 in England, nine years after the Liverpool factory closed. This organisation is considered the modern replacement of the Guild system and now has some 600 members in over 30 countries.

Today, over one hundred years since its inception, there are thousands of Meccano enthusiasts worldwide, many clubs and hundreds of websites covering Meccano history, model building instructions and nostalgia. Individuals and companies worldwide still manufacture parts, some long out of production. There are annual Meccano exhibitions around the world, notably in France (at a different venue around May each year) and at Skegness in England (around July every year). Many notable shows also take place in South Africa, Australia and New Zealand each year, to name a few.

Publications devoted fully or in part to Meccano included Meccano Magazine from 1916 to 1981, and numerous Special Model Leaflets aimed at serious enthusiasts, on how to construct very large, complex models and machines. Some models use many more parts than an entire Set 10. The original large models from the 1930s model leaflets are called the Meccano Super Models, often popular at Meccano and other model engineering exhibitions and sometimes used as nostalgic showpieces by retailers. Modern dedicated publications include: Constructor Quarterly, The International Meccanoman and the ModelPlans series of instructions. These feature large model instructions and ideas for enthusiasts. There are also a myriad of club-generated periodicals, featuring Meccano content and keeping enthusiasts in touch.

The careers many people chose were influenced by their experience and knowledge gained from using the product.

Meccano is mentioned in the first chapter of Graham Greene's novel The Power and the Glory. It also mentioned at some length in J. J. Connington's 1928 detective novel, Nemesis at Raynham Parva (U.S. title, Grim Vengeance, 1929).

Pierre Bastien is a French musical artist who has created a large collection of kinetic experimental musical instruments constructed with Meccano.

In Sydney, Australia an overhead gantry with directional signs and traffic lights erected in 1962 is named the Meccano Set.

Arthur C. Clarke mentions his childhood fascination with Meccano and his return to it as an adult in his 1989 memoir, Astounding Days: A Science Fictional Autobiography.

On 6 April 2013 a new 6.4 m (21 ft) footbridge was opened at Nob End, Little Lever, Bolton, Manchester over the Bolton and Bury Canal. It is made of Meccano parts, including bolts and nuts, accurately scaled up by ten times.

Meccano is the centrepiece of the Mentoring Using Meccano program of School Volunteer Program ACT. Volunteers use Meccano to mentor bright primary school students who need help in improving their communication or social skills, which builds students' self-esteem.

== Owners ==
Period	Ownership	Comments
1901–1908	Frank Hornby (inventor) and David Elliott (financier)	Branded as "Mechanics Made Easy"
1908–1936	Meccano Ltd, UK. 100% owned by Frank Hornby	Frank Hornby bought out David Elliott and rebranded the business.
1936–1964	Meccano Ltd, UK. 100% owned by Frank Hornby's family	Frank Hornby died in 1936
1964–1971	Lines Bros Ltd, UK (quoted on London Stock Exchange)	Argentine rights licensed to Exacto in 1966
1971–1980	Airfix Products Ltd, UK (quoted on London Stock Exchange)	Commonwealth rights only
1971–1980	General Mills Inc, US (quoted on New York Stock Exchange)	Rest of world rights except Argentina
1981–1985	General Mills Inc, US (quoted on New York Stock Exchange)	Global rights except Argentina
1985–1989	Meccano SN, France (Owned by Marc Redibo)	Revoked Argentine licence to secure global rights
1989–2000	Meccano SN, France (Owned by Dominique Duvauchelle)	
2000–2007	Meccano SN, France (Owned 51% by Dominique Duvauchelle and 49% by Nikko Toys of Japan)	Nikko distributed Meccano outside France during this period.
2007–2013	Meccano SN, France (Owned 51% by Ingroup and 49% by 21 Centrale Partners)	Ingroup: Owned by the Inberg family who ran Meccano. 21 Centrale Partners: Owned by the Benetton family
2013–2024	Spin Master Ltd, Canada (Quoted on Toronto Stock Exchange from 2015)	Design and marketing in US and Canada. Calais base closed in 2023.
2025–present	Spin Master Ltd, Canada licences brand to Addo Play	Design and marketing in UK.

== See also ==
- Bayko – English building model construction toy
- fischertechnik – Construction toy
- K'Nex – American toy company
- Lego Technic – Lego line for more advanced models
- Modular design – Design approach
- Open-source robotics – Open-source branch of robotics
- T-slot structural framing – Framing system made of extruded aluminum
- Tetrix Robotics Kit – Robotics kit for educational and competition use
