= Charles Plimpton =

English inventor and businessman

Charles Bird Plimpton
- Born: 31 October 1894; Peckham, London, England
- Died: 29 December 1948 (aged 54); Liverpool, England
- Occupations: Toy inventor, businessman
- Known for: Inventor of Bayko

Charles Bird Plimpton (31 October 1894 – 29 December 1948) was an English inventor and businessman. He invented Bayko in 1933, a plastic building model construction toy, and one of the earliest plastic toys to be marketed. He established Plimpton Engineering in Liverpool, England, to manufacture the toy, which was sold across the world for over 30 years.

== Biography ==
Charles Plimpton was born in 1893 in Peckham, London, to John Calvin Plimpton, an American citizen, and Caroline Augusta Plimpton (née Bird). Plimpton's father later moved his family to Liverpool where he established his own company, J.C. Plimpton & Co – Import & Export American Merchants.

Charles Plimpton attended school at Liverpool College. In 1911 he went to the University of Birmingham to study Engineering, but only completed two years and dropped out in 1913. During World War I, Plimpton enlisted as a wireless operator with the Royal Navy and served much of his time on minesweepers.

In 1922 Plimpton married Margaret Audrey, with whom he had two daughters, Anne and Jean. They lived in Wallasey, which was then a part of Cheshire. In the mid-1920s Plimpton contracted tuberculosis and spent much of the next ten years in a sanatorium. But it was during this confinement that Plimpton began working on the design of a new construction toy. Based on a toy popular in the 1920s and 1930s, the card and wood Mobaco Building Sets made by Mobal in the Netherlands, Plimpton adapted its design to use plastic pieces made from Bakelite. Bakelite was a recently developed synthetic plastic, and, at the time, the world's first commercial plastic.

=== Bayko ===
"BAYKO" ORIGINATOR It is with deep regret that we have to record the passing of Mr. C.B. Plimpton, originator of the Bayko plastic building sets. He crossed the border on December 29th last year after a long illness.

The late Mr. Plimpton was the proprietor of the Plimpton Engineering Co. and was one of the first members of the toy trade to use plastics in toy production.

We learnt that arrangements are in hand for the formation of a new company with effect from April 1st, the title of which will be the Plimpton Engineering Co. Ltd. Mrs. Plimpton, to whom we offer our sincere condolences, will be the governing director and the manager of the company. Mr. R. J. Cowell will be the managing director.

The new directors will endeavour to continue the known desires of the late Mr. Plimpton in regard to "Bayko," whose keenness for this product was so well known to all who had contact with him.

— Obituary in "Games and Toys", February 1949

On 20 November 1933, Plimpton applied for a patent for "An Improved Constructional Building Toy", which was granted on 16 January 1935 as patent No. 422,645. Limited production of his new toy began in late 1935, where he used the kitchen of his house and the help of his family to pack the construction sets. In 1934, he established Plimpton Engineering Company Limited in Liverpool to manufacture his product, and by the end of 1934, "Bayko Light Construction Sets" were in full production. The term "Bayko Light" was derived from the name "Bakelite".

Over the next ten years the Bayko system was improved on and its production grew as the construction sets were exported across the world.

In the late 1940s Plimpton applied for, and was granted on 2 December 1948, a second patent No. 613,767 entitled "Improvements in Constructional Building Toys". It dealt with the design of new parts for Bayko, but they were never manufactured. Plimpton's tuberculosis had resurfaced again and he had spent most of his last year in a sanatorium in North Wales. He died on 29 December 1948 at the age of 55.

Plimpton was well respected in the toy trade, and an obituary was placed in the February 1949 issue of Games and Toys (see box).

Plimpton's wife continued running Plimpton Engineering for the next ten years, but retired in 1959 after Bayko began losing its market share to new construction toys like Lego. She sold the company to Meccano Ltd in 1960, who continued manufacturing Bayko for another seven years.
