= Constructor Quarterly =

British magazine

- Constructor Quarterly logo
- Frequency: Quarterly
- Publisher: RJ Publications
- First issue: 1988
- Country: UK
- Based in: Sheffield
- Language: English
- Website: www.constructorquarterly.com

Constructor Quarterly is a quarterly British magazine aimed at Meccano enthusiasts. It was founded in 1988.

It is published in Sheffield in the UK by RJ Publications. It consists mainly of photos and descriptions of Meccano models made by the Meccano enthusiasts community. It also features news and comment on the subject of Meccano.
