= Frank Hornby =

English toy inventor, businessman and politician

- Born: 15 May 1863; Copperas Hill, Liverpool, Lancashire, England
- Died: 21 September 1936 (aged 73); Maghull, Liverpool, Lancashire, England
- Occupations: Toy inventor; businessman; politician
- Known for: Inventor of Meccano

Member of Parliament for Liverpool Everton
- In office 27 October 1931 – 25 October 1935
- Preceded by: Derwent Hall Caine
- Succeeded by: Bertie Kirby
- Majority: 4,400 (17.7%)

Personal details
- Party: Conservative

Frank Hornby (15 May 1863 – 21 September 1936) was an English inventor, businessman and politician. He was a visionary in toy development and manufacture, and although he had no formal engineering training, he was responsible for the invention and production of three of the most popular lines of toys based on engineering principles in the 20th century: Meccano, Hornby Model Railways and Dinky Toys. He also founded the British toy company Meccano Ltd in 1908, and launched a monthly publication, Meccano Magazine in 1916.

Hornby's inventions and initiatives made him a millionaire in the 1930s. He entered politics in 1931 when he was elected as a Conservative MP for the Everton constituency. Hornby's legacy has persisted long after his death with enthusiasts all over the world still building Meccano models and collecting his toys. The 150th anniversary of Hornby's birth was celebrated in Liverpool and Brighton on 15 May 2013.

== Biography ==
Born on 15 May 1863 at 77 Copperas Hill, Liverpool, Lancashire, Hornby was the son of John Oswald Hornby, a provision merchant and his wife Martha Hornby (née Thomlinson), though this date has been questioned. It is the date on his birth certificate, but the entry in the family bible in his mother's handwriting gives the date as 2 May. At the age of sixteen, Hornby left school and started working as a cashier in his father's business. On 15 January 1887 he married a schoolteacher Clara Walker Godefroy, the daughter of a customs officer and they had two sons, Roland and Douglas, and a daughter, Patricia. When his father died in 1899, his father's business was closed and Hornby became a bookkeeper for David Hugh Elliot who ran a meat importing business in Liverpool.

After experimenting with new ideas in his home workshop, Hornby began making toys for his sons in 1899 with pieces he cut from sheet metal. He built models of bridges, trucks and cranes, although the pieces they were made from were not interchangeable. The breakthrough came when Hornby realised that if he could make separate, interchangeable parts that could be bolted together, any model could be built from the same components. The key inventive step was the realisation that regular perforations in the structural pieces could be used, not only to join them together with nuts and bolts, but also to journal – act as a bearing for – axles and shafts. This made the construction of complex mechanisms relatively simple. He started making metal strips by hand from copper sheets. The strips were half an inch wide with holes for bolts spaced at half-inch intervals. Initially he made the nuts and bolts himself, but he soon found an alternate source of supply.

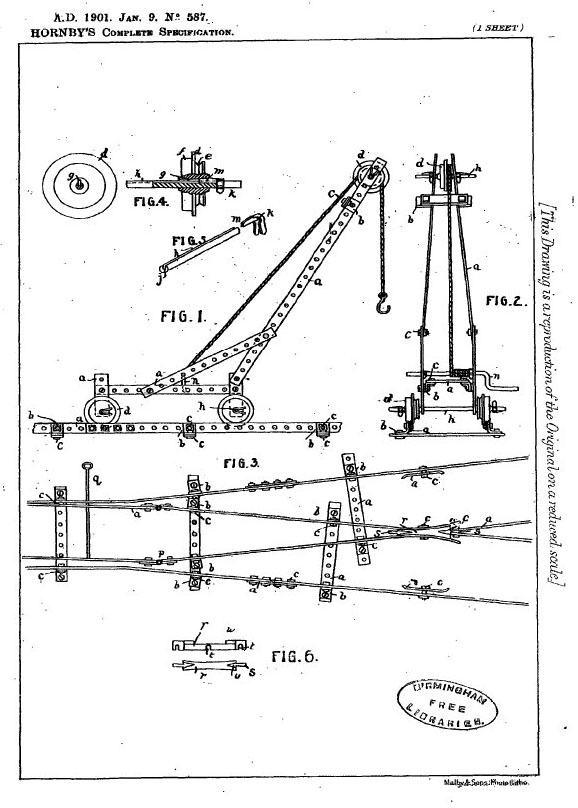
Frank Hornby's 1901 patent number GB190100587A for what later became known as Meccano

By the end of 1900 Hornby had built a set of parts he considered worth marketing. On advice, he patented his invention in January 1901 as "Improvements in Toy or Educational Devices for Children and Young People", but not without first having to borrow £5 from his employer, David Elliot, to cover the costs.

During 1901 Hornby began looking for companies to manufacture his product, but it was poorly finished and did not attract much attention. Still having to support his family on the small wage he earned, Hornby did not have much time to market his invention. Fortunately, his employer saw potential in what Hornby was doing and offered him some vacant premises next to the office where he worked to pursue his ideas. With this move, Elliot and Hornby became partners.

=== Mechanics Made Easy ===
Hornby now called his construction toy "Mechanics Made Easy" and after receiving a positive endorsement from professor Henry Selby Hele-Shaw, then Head of the Engineering Department at Liverpool University, Hornby managed to secure contracts with outside manufacturers to supply the parts for his construction sets. With the financial assistance of his partner, "Mechanics Made Easy" sets went on sale in 1902.

Each set had only 16 different parts with a leaflet detailing the construction of 12 models. In 1903, 1,500 sets were sold, although no profit was made. New parts were continually being introduced and in 1904, six sets, packed in tin boxes with instruction manuals in French and English, became available. In 1905 two new sets were introduced and in 1906, for the first time, a small profit was made.

By 1907 Hornby's part suppliers could not meet the demand. This prompted Hornby to quit his job with Elliot and find suitable premises to begin manufacturing his own parts. He secured a three-year lease on a workshop in Duke Street, by Dukes Terrace in the Rope Walks area of Liverpool, and with the help of a loan granted to Hornby and Elliot for machinery and wages, they were manufacturing their own parts by June 1907.

=== Meccano ===
In September 1907, Hornby registered his famous "Meccano" trade mark and used this name on all new sets. To raise more capital to invest in a larger factory and plant, a company had to be created. This led to the formation of Meccano Ltd on 30 May 1908. Elliot had decided not to join the new company, leaving Hornby as the sole proprietor. The Meccano factory was relocated to West Derby Road in Liverpool, and in 1910 the famous "MECCANO" logo was commissioned. Meccano Ltd's turnover for the 1910 financial year was £12,000.

Meccano was exported to many countries and in 1912, Hornby and his son, Roland, formed Meccano (France) Ltd in Paris to manufacture Meccano. An office was also opened in Berlin, (Germany) and Märklin began to manufacture Meccano under licence. Hornby also started importing clockwork motors from Märklin.

To keep pace with demand, a new factory was built in Binns Road, Liverpool. By September 1914 the Binns Road Factory was in full production and became the company headquarters for over 60 years.

=== Other initiatives ===
In addition to Meccano, Hornby developed and manufactured a number of other model kits and toys, including:

- 1909 – "Hornby System of Mechanical Demonstration", an educational set.
- 1915 – Clockwork lithographed tinplate O gauge trains.
- 1920 – The Hornby Clockwork Train (0 gauge), enameled tinplate – later Hornby Series – later Hornby Trains.
- 1934 – Dinky Toys, die-cast miniature model cars and trucks (first introduced under the Hornby name in 1931) .
- 1938 – Hornby Dublo model railway system (00 gauge. Introduced after Hornby's death).

In 1916, Hornby launched a monthly publication, Meccano Magazine, which remained in circulation for over sixty years, and in 1930 he formed the Meccano Guild, an amalgamation of Meccano clubs from all over the world.

=== Member of Parliament and final years ===
By the 1930s, Hornby had become a millionaire. He owned a mansion Quarry Brook in Maghull (his first house in Maghull was the Hollies in Station Road), and was chauffeured to Binns Road every day by limousine. In 1931 he entered politics when he was elected as a Conservative MP for the Everton constituency. He left the running of the company to his co-Directors and staff. But he did not stay in politics long, standing down at the 1935 General Election.

Hornby died of a chronic heart condition complicated by diabetes in Maghull, near Liverpool, Lancashire, on 21 September 1936. He is buried in the grounds of St Andrew's Church, Maghull. His elder son Roland took over as chairman of Meccano Ltd.

Hornby's legacy lives on today with thousands of enthusiasts all over the world still building Meccano models, running Hornby Train sets and collecting Dinky Toys. In his homeplace of Maghull there is a local Wetherspoons pub named after him, The Frank Hornby.

== 150th anniversary ==
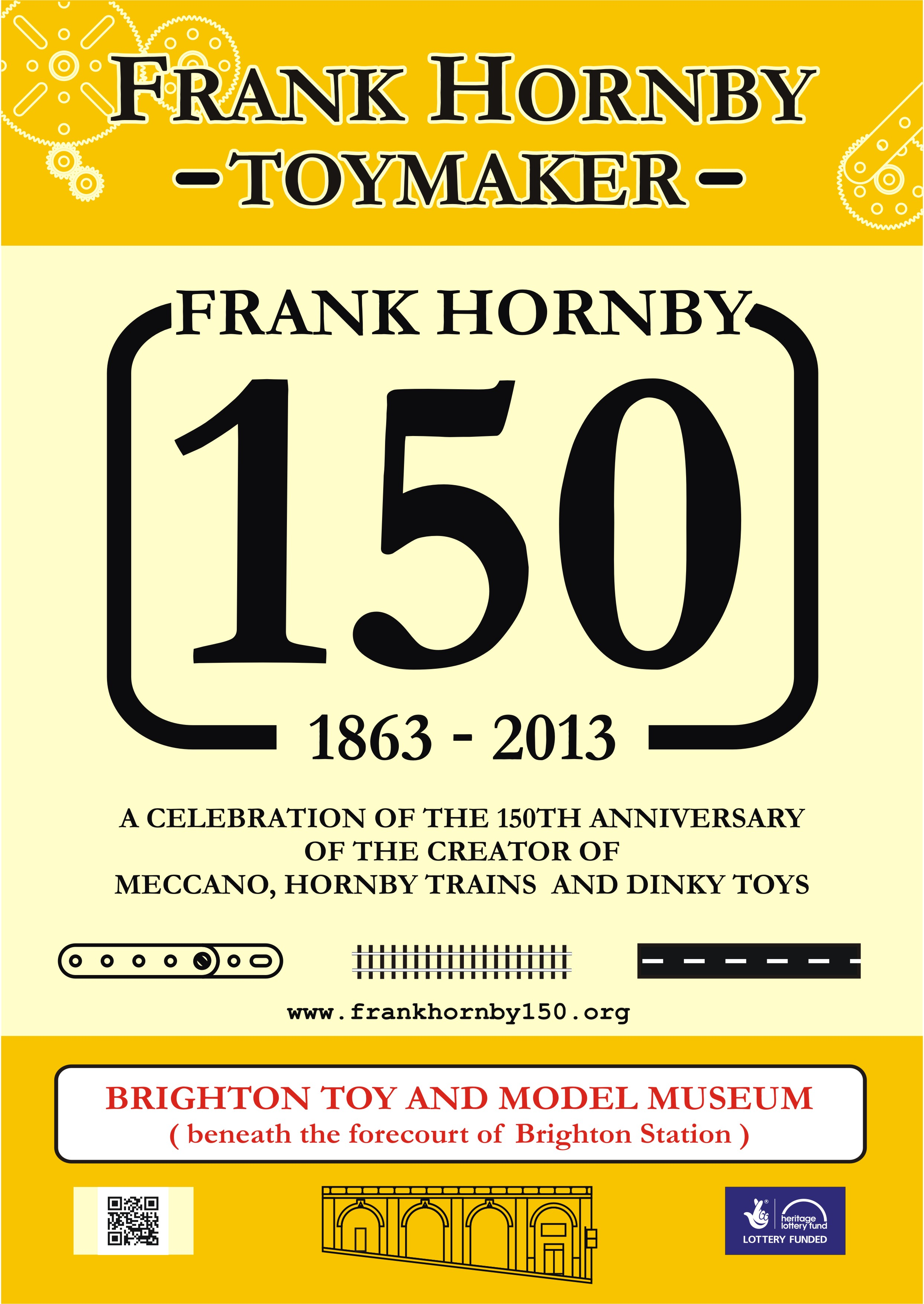
Poster for the 2013 Heritage Lottery Fund-supported anniversary project

The 150th anniversary of Frank Hornby's birth fell on 15 May 2013, and festivities were held by the National Museums Liverpool and the Frank Hornby Charitable Trust, Maghull, and by the Brighton Toy and Model Museum.

Google also celebrated the 150th anniversary with a Google Doodle on their UK homepage on 15 May 2013.

== See also ==
- List of English inventors and designers

== Bibliography ==
- McReavy, Anthony (2002). The Toy Story – The Life and Times of Inventor Frank Hornby. Ebury Press. p. 288. ISBN 0-09-188117-X.

Parliament of the United Kingdom
Preceded by Derwent Hall Caine	Member of Parliament for Liverpool, Everton; 1931 – 1935	Succeeded by Bertie Victor Kirby
