= Meccano Ltd =

British toy company

Mecanno Ltd.
- Founded: 1908
- Founder: Frank Hornby
- Defunct: 1964; 62 years ago
- Fate: Taken over by Lines Bros in 1964
- Headquarters: U.K.
- Products: Toys, scale model trains, cars
- Brands: Meccano; Hornby; Dinky; Bayko

Meccano Ltd was a British toy manufacturing company, established in 1908 by Frank Hornby in Liverpool, England, to manufacture and distribute Meccano and other model toys and kits created by the company. During the 1920s and 1930s it became the biggest toy manufacturer in the United Kingdom and produced three of the most popular lines of toys in the twentieth century: Meccano, Hornby Trains and Dinky Toys.

Financial problems beset the company in the early 1960s and Meccano Ltd was taken over by Lines Bros Ltd in 1964.

== History ==
=== Beginning and development ===
In 1901 Frank Hornby, a clerk from Liverpool, England, invented a new construction toy called "Mechanics Made Easy", which soon became known as Meccano. To manufacture and distribute Meccano, Hornby needed to raise capital to invest in factory and plant, and this resulted in the establishment of Meccano Ltd in 1908, with Hornby as the sole proprietor. A factory was acquired in West Derby Road in Liverpool and the company began producing Meccano sets for sale across the UK.

In 1909 Meccano Ltd added to its range by launching the "Hornby System of Mechanical Demonstration". This was an educational set Hornby had created for use in schools which included a 44-page manual, showing all dimensions in centimetres. However, it was not a commercial success and it was discontinued after five years. This was the first use of the Hornby name, which later was to become synonymous with the company's Hornby Dublo 00 gauge model railway system.

By 1910 Meccano was exported worldwide, and its success prompted Meccano Ltd to expand its operations. In 1912, Hornby and his son, Roland, formed Meccano (France) Ltd in Paris to manufacture Meccano, and an office was opened in Berlin, Germany where Märklin began to manufacture Meccano under licence. Meccano factories were also established in Spain and Argentina. In 1912 Hornby started importing clockwork motors from Märklin, but when the supply from Germany stopped after the outbreak of World War I in 1914, he began manufacturing his own clockwork motors in Liverpool.

Up to this point Meccano was being manufactured in England at the small factory in West Derby Road, Liverpool, but it soon became apparent that it could not meet the growing demand for Meccano, and in 1914 a new factory was built in Binns Road, Liverpool. The Binns Road factory became the company headquarters for over 60 years.

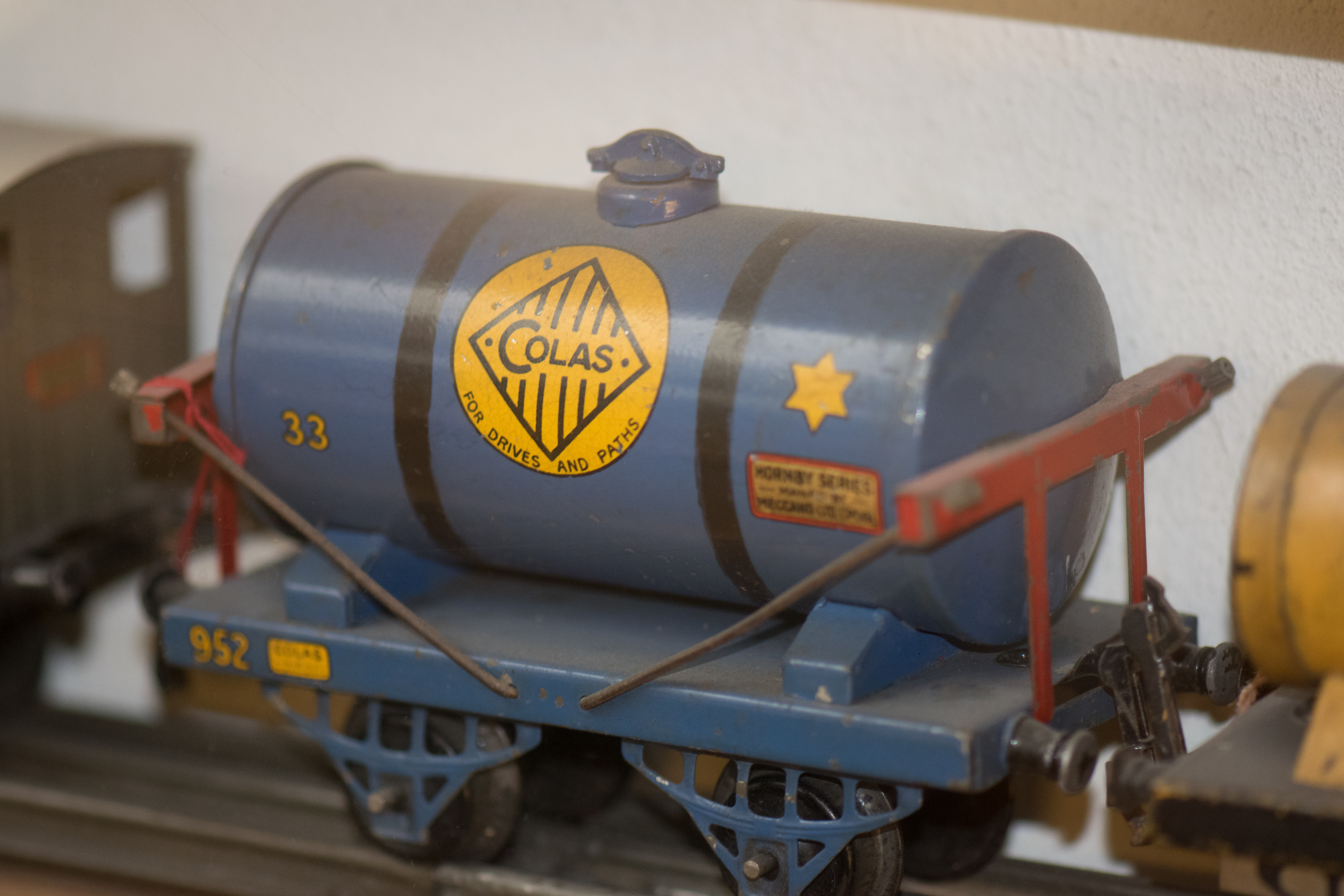
Hornby's freight wagon

In 1920 the company started to produce 0 gauge model railways, and this production line continued into the 1960s. In 1922, Meccano Ltd opened a factory in Elizabeth, New Jersey where it produced its building sets for the North American market. In 1927 it started producing clockwork lithographed tinplate 0 gauge trains there as well. However, in 1929, it sold its New Jersey business to the A. C. Gilbert Company, whose similar Erector Set toy was popular in the United States, and Meccano's trains and construction sets disappeared from the U.S. market by 1930.

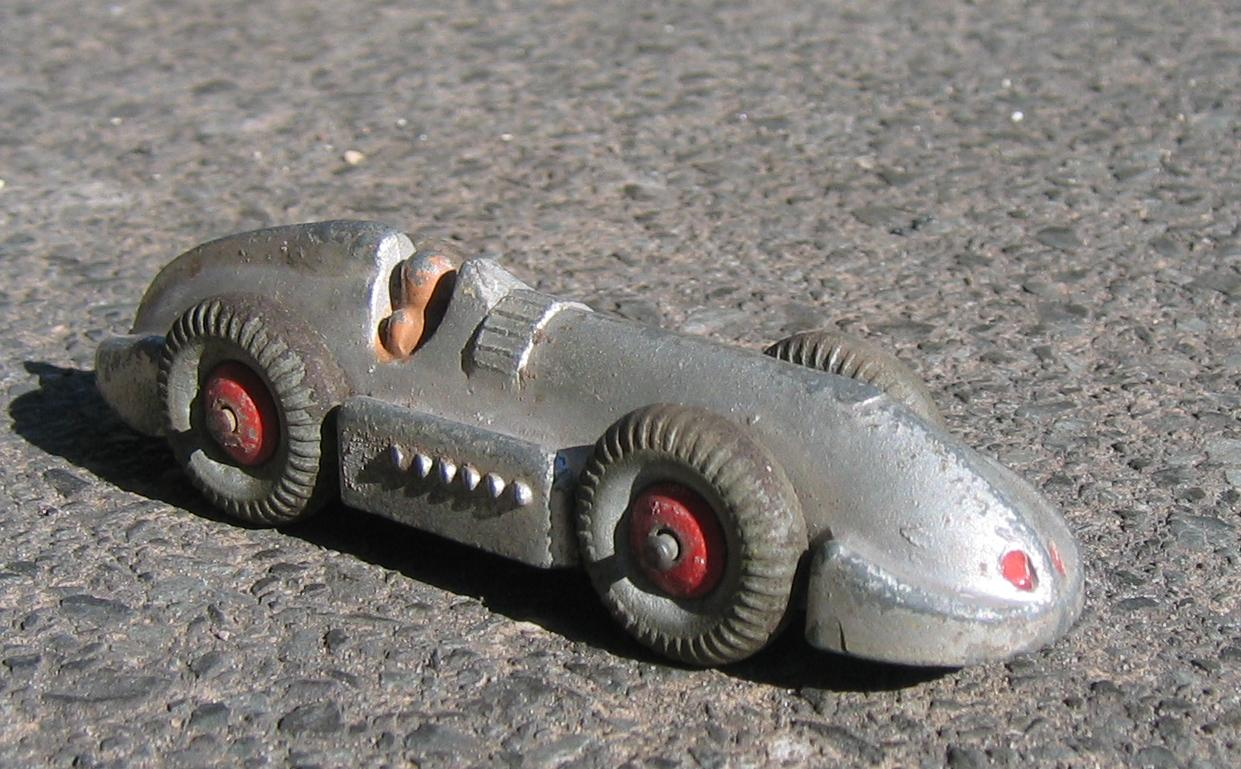
Dinky 23e model of George Eyston's land record car, "Speed of the Wind". The toy was made from 1936 to 1956.

In 1931 Meccano Ltd introduced Modelled Miniatures to complement their railway sets and in early 1934 these became Dinky Toys, a new line of die-cast miniature model cars and trucks under the trade mark "Meccano Dinky Toys". In the same year, they also introduced a construction toy for younger children called Dinky Builder. It comprised rectangular and triangular hinged metal plates that could be quickly and easily assembled. The parts were painted emerald green, red, (and later blue and yellow), with jade green and salmon pink in an attempt to draw girls into the otherwise boys-only toy market.

In 1938 Meccano Ltd launched the 00 gauge Hornby Dublo model railway system, comprising both clockwork and electric train sets. Production continued until 1964.

In 1942 the production of all toys ceased due to wartime legislation and the company switched to manufacturing for the war effort. Despite the heavy bombing of Liverpool during the war, the Binns Road factory was not damaged. The production of Meccano, Dinky Toys and Hornby Dublo slowly resumed after the war in 1945, but was interrupted again in 1950 by the Korean War due to a shortage of metal.

In 1960 Meccano Ltd purchased Bayko, a Bakelite building model construction toy, from Plimpton Engineering in Liverpool, and moved all its production to Meccano's factory in Speke, Liverpool. The construction sets were updated and polystyrene was used for all the plastic parts instead of Bakelite. Manufacture of Bayko continued until 1967. Meccano Ltd also manufactured Kemex (chemistry sets) and Elektron (electrical sets).

=== Takeovers ===
By the early 1960s Meccano Ltd began experiencing financial problems, in spite of exports worth over £1m, and was bought out by Lines Bros Ltd (tradename: "Tri-ang"), Meccano's biggest competitor, in February 1964. This purchase included both the British and French Meccano factories. Sweeping changes were implemented, including the removal from office of the last members of the Hornby family and applying the "Hornby" name to the Tri-ang plastic trains. In 1970 Lines Brothers changed the company name to "Meccano-Tri-ang".

In 1971 the Lines Brothers Tri-ang group went into voluntary liquidation and 'Meccano-Tri-ang' was eventually sold to Airfix industries in 1972, the company name reverting to "Meccano Ltd". At the same time, General Mills, a United States toy manufacturer, purchased the majority of shares of Meccano France S.A., renaming the French company "Miro-Meccano".

=== The new Meccano ===
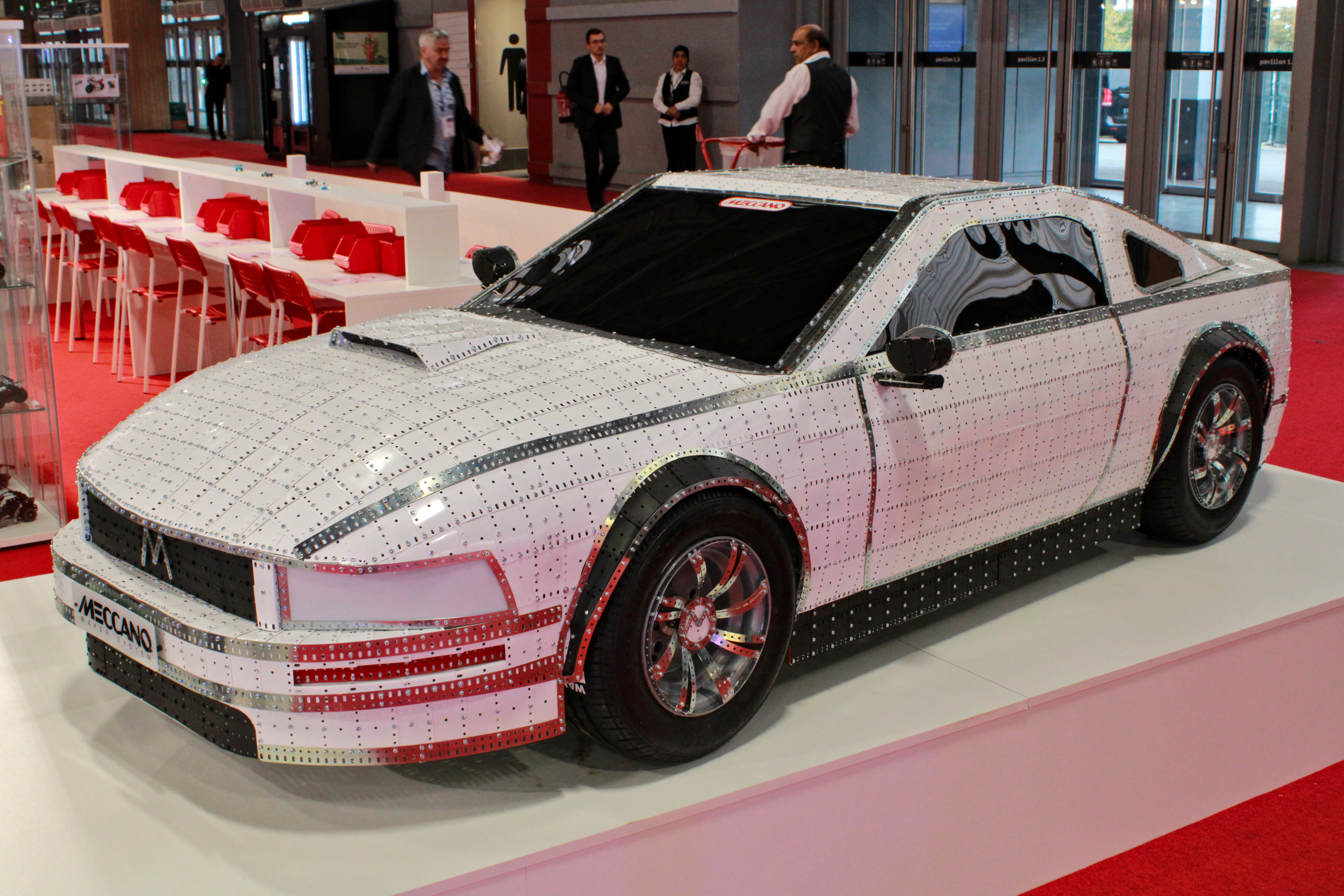
Meccano model car at Paris Motor Show 2018

With competition from other manufacturers from around the world and the increasing popularity of television, Meccano Ltd's dominance of the toy market diminished sharply. To cut their losses, Airfix closed Meccano Ltd's flagship Binns Road factory in Liverpool in November 1979, bringing to an end three-quarters of a century of British toy making. Management tried to put the blame for the closure on workers, but failures by management to modernise were the real cause.

The manufacture of Meccano, however, still continued in France. Airfix were eventually liquidated two years later and in 1981 General Mills purchased Meccano Ltd UK, giving it complete control of the Meccano franchise. It shifted all Meccano and Airfix operations to France and completely revamped the Miro-Meccano construction sets.

In August 1985 French accountant Marc Rebibo bought Miro-Meccano from General Mills, reverted the French company name to "Meccano S.A." and reintroduced some of the discontinued Meccano sets. In 1989 Rebibo was bought out by Finamec (Financière de Serbie), who continued the manufacture of Meccano in France. In 1990 Meccano France purchased the "Erector" trademark in the U.S.A. and started selling Meccano sets marked "Erector Meccano" in the U.S.A.

By 2000 Meccano France was faltering and was bought out in May 2000 by the Japanese toy company Nikko, who continue to manufacture Meccano sets in France and China, although very different from the Meccano originally manufactured by the Binns Road factory.

In 2013 Meccano was acquired by Spin Master.
