= J. W. Spear & Sons =

Board game manufacturer including Scrabble

J. W. Spear and Sons Spear's Games
- Type: Wholly owned subsidiary of Mattel
- Industry: Toys and games
- Founded: 1879; 147 years ago
- Founder: Jacob Wolf Spier
- Defunct: 1994
- Fate: Acquired by Hasbro
- Headquarters: Fürth, near Nuremberg, Germany

J. W. Spear and Sons was a manufacturer of board games during the 20th century. The company was founded by Jacob Wolf Spier (1832-1893) in Fürth, near Nuremberg, Germany in 1879. They initially produced goods such as table mats, photo frames, and waste-paper baskets. By the turn of the century, games had become their main product.

In 1932, the company set up a factory in Brimsdown, Enfield, Britain to avoid customs duties. With the rise to power of the Nazis and the Spier family being Jewish, some members of the family moved to Britain and subsequently Anglicised their name to Spear. The Nuremberg factory was forcibly "purchased" by a German businessman, and survived most of World War II under Nazi control until the Royal Air Force bombed it. The UK factory switched to military production during the war and then returned to making games. In 1954, the company acquired the rights to produce and market Scrabble for markets outside North America. In addition to board games, they also made the Brickplayer construction toy.

The company was floated on the London Stock Exchange in 1966 and was taken over by Mattel in 1994 after a bidding war with Hasbro. Mattel closed the UK factory, and while it still produces Scrabble, most of the traditional Spear's Games are no longer made. About 2000 old games were collected in an archive by the former chairman Francis Spear. In 2017 the UK archive was closed and the games moved to the German Games Archive in Nuremberg. They are gradually being photographed and uploaded to a database. Some are on Google Arts & Culture.
