= Wilfred Pickles =

British actor (1904–1978)

Wilfred Pickles OBE
- Pickles in 1950
- Born: 13 October 1904; Halifax, Yorkshire, England
- Died: 27 March 1978 (aged 73); Brighton, Sussex, England
- Occupation: Actor
- Years active: 1931–1975
- Spouse: Mabel Pickles (m. 1930)
- Children: 1

Wilfred Pickles (13 October 1904 – 27 March 1978) was an English actor and radio presenter.

== Early life and personal life ==
Pickles was born in Halifax in the West Riding of Yorkshire. He moved to Southport, Lancashire, with his family in 1929, and worked with his father as a builder. He joined an amateur dramatic society, and in a local production there met Mabel Cecilia Myerscough (1906–1989), all of whose family had been connected with the stage.

He remained a proud Yorkshireman, and having been selected by the BBC as an announcer for its North Regional radio service, he went on to be an occasional newsreader on the BBC Home Service during the Second World War. He was the first newsreader to speak in an accent other than Received Pronunciation, "a deliberate attempt to make it more difficult for Nazis to impersonate BBC broadcasters", and caused some comment by wishing his fellow northerners "Good neet".

== Early career ==
Pickles' first professional appearance was as an extra in Henry Baynton's production of Julius Caesar at the Theatre Royal in Halifax in the 1920s. He soon became a radio celebrity, and pursued an acting career in London's West End theatre and on television and on film. In 1952 he starred in the play The Gay Dog at the Piccadilly Theatre and reprised his role for the 1954 film adaptation.

== Have A Go and Ask Pickles ==
Pickles' most significant work was as host of the BBC Radio show Have A Go, which ran from 1946 to 1967 and launched such catchphrases as "How do, how are yer?", "Are yer courting?", "What's on the table, Mabel?" and "Give him the money, Barney!" He appeared in the show with his wife Mabel, whom he had married at Sacred Heart Roman Catholic Church, Ainsdale, Southport, on 20 September 1930.

The series attracted a weekly audience of over 20 million and a mailbag of around 5,000 letters. Contestants could earn £1/19s/11d by sharing "their intimate secrets". In May 1954, he took the show to television with the programme Ask Pickles which ran until 1956. The show was publicized enthusiastically by the BBC:

It doesn't matter how old you are, you can still make your own special dream come true if you get in touch with Wilfred Pickles. Maybe you want to feed a lion or pat a giraffe on the tiny top of his head; or perhaps you'd rather see the lovely lights of London reflected on the Thames, or ride pillion on a motorbike. Maybe you want to meet a film star or you might even want to have a fight—all right! Just ask Wilfred Pickles. He'll try to fix it for you.

— BBC publicity for Ask Pickles

In 1948, a children's board game entitled Ask Pickles was published by jigsaw puzzle manufacturer Tower Press.

== Other television and radio ==
Pickles was the guest castaway on BBC Radio's Desert Island Discs on 2 January 1953; his chosen book was The Oxford Book of English Verse edited by Arthur Quiller-Couch and his luxury a yellow waistcoat.

On television, among many performances, he appeared in Dr. Finlay's Casebook and For the Love of Ada, co-starring with Irene Handl.

He appeared in the 1963 film Billy Liar where he played the title character's father.

He was in the play Come Laughing Home by Keith Waterhouse and Willis Hall on BBC Radio 4 in 1970. He also played the part of Horatio Hobson in the play Hobson's Choice on the BBC's Saturday Night Theatre programme.

In 1971, he was the subject of This Is Your Life.

== Publications ==
In 1949, Pickles published an autobiography titled Between You and Me - The Autobiography of Wilfred Pickles.

In 1955, Pickles published an anthology of poetry and prose of the "north counties" of England. The book, My North Countrie, featured verses from a range of poets and writers including two Lancashire dialect verses, "A Bird Song Away" and "Th' Art Lookin' Sackless", from the weaver-poet Nicholas Freeston.

In 1956, Mabel Pickles published a memoir of her relationship with Wilfred entitled Married to Wilfred.

== Later life ==
In 1950, Pickles was awarded the Order of the British Empire (OBE) for services to broadcasting.

In 1955, he opened the Wilfred Pickles' School for Spastics at Tixover Grange, Rutland. Also in 1955, he and wife Mabel celebrated their silver wedding anniversary by returning to the Sacred Heart Church in Southport, when they gave money for a statue of Saint Teresa Margaret of the Sacred Heart, which stands in the church. They recorded an edition of Have a Go from the church hall (now demolished) and later performed a version of the show in the adjacent school for the children.

Pickles died in Brighton on 27 March 1978, aged 73. He is buried with his wife Mabel in Southern Cemetery, Manchester.

== Legacy ==
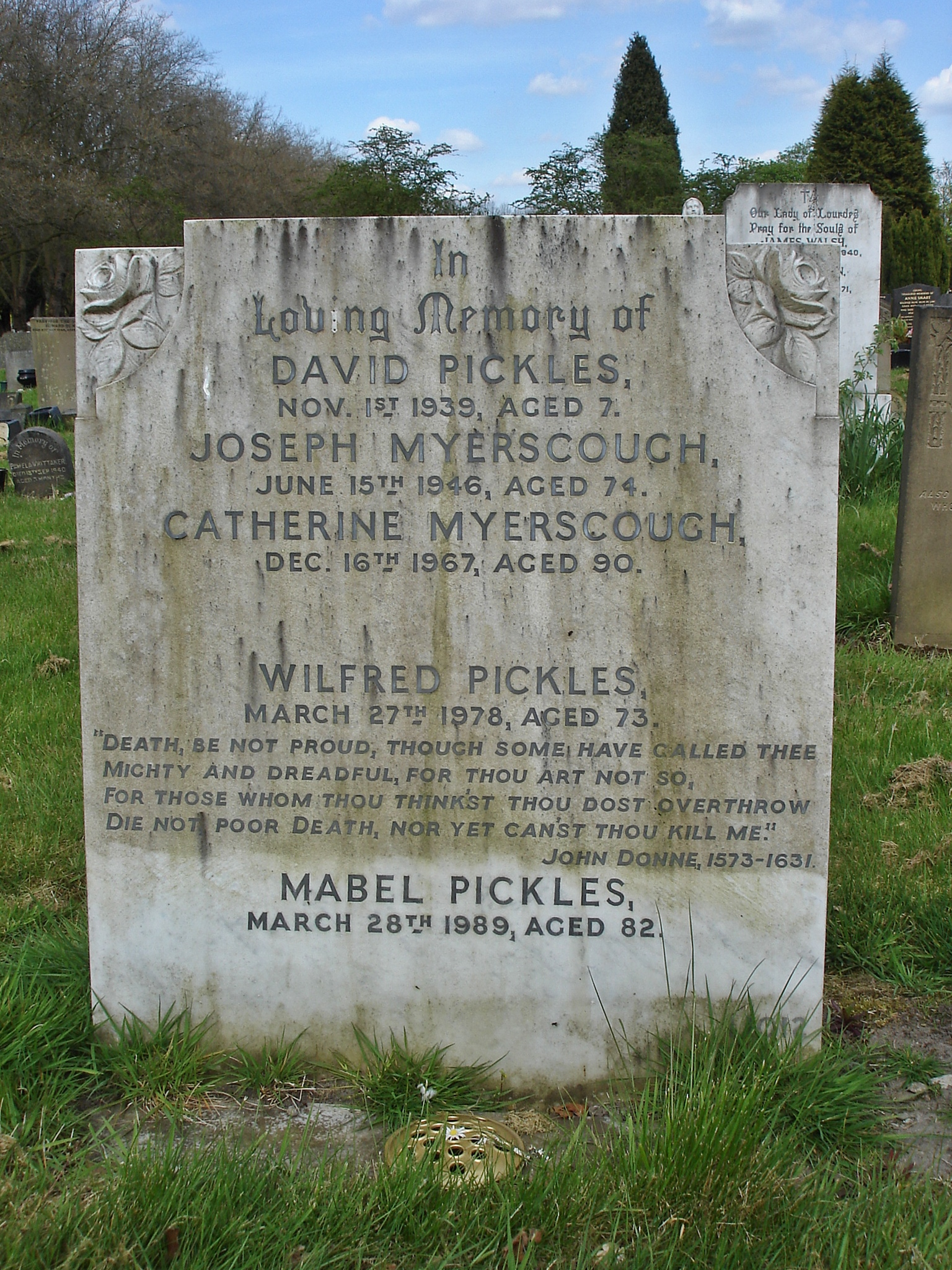
Wilfred and Mabel Pickles' grave, Southern Cemetery, Manchester

Pickles was the uncle of judge James Pickles and actor Christina Pickles, and great-uncle of actress Carolyn Pickles.

The now-defunct "Portman & Pickles" public house in Market Street, Halifax, was named after him and film actor Eric Portman.

== Selected filmography ==
- Serious Charge (1959)
- Billy Liar (1963)
- The Family Way (1966)
- For the Love of Ada (1972)
