= Auto Pilen =

Spanish die-cast car manufacturer

Pilen S.A.
- Founded: 1962
- Founder: Pilar and Enrique Climent
- Defunct: 1983; 43 years ago
- Headquarters: Ibi, Spain
- Products: Die-cast model cars, aircraft

Pilen S.A. (also known as Auto Pilen) was a Spanish manufacturing company headquartered in Ibi, Alicante, which produced die-cast scale model cars from the 1970s through the mid-1990s mostly in 1:43 scale. A majority of the castings were inherited from French Dinky.

The company was started in the 1960s, diecasting items like colorful metal sailboats and key chains. In the late 1980s, Pilen was apparently bought by AHC of the Netherlands.

== Overview ==
"Climent Hermanos S.A." (traded as CLIM) had been established by brothers José, Ramón, Rafael, and Enrique Climent in 1951 to make scale model cars and military vehicles. In 1962, Enrique left family business to found his own company along with his wife Pilar. The company's name ("Pil-En") was an acronym derived from couple's both names.

At the beginning, the business produced toy guns made of zamal. In January 1970 Pilen was registared as a sociedad anónima, then moving to a new location on Vicente Aleixandre street also in Alicante. Pilen remained in the business until 1983, when the company closed definitely.

== Products ==
Pilen made at least 50 different models, in the most convoluted story of diecast seconds and recasts of any successful diecast manufacturer. Dies were apparently used or copied from a variety of other companies including Dinky, Corgi, Solido, Mebetoys, Tekno, Politoys (Polistil), and possibly some Mercury models.

=== European cars ===
Vehicles in Auto Pilen's lineup were mostly European and included Ferraris, Porsches, Renaults, Citroens, Mercedes-Benz, Volvos and some American cars as well. There was also a line of at least eight Formula One cars in 1/43 scale from the 1960s including BRM, Ferrari, Lola-Climax, Lotus-Climax, Cooper-Maserati, Brabham, and Honda. A few helicopters and airplanes were available. Numbering for the regular 1:43 series began with an "M" (perhaps reminiscent of Politoys M-Series) and went from 300 to 500.

Since this was a Spanish company, FIATs are not shown as FIAT, rather they are SEATs (pronounced 'say-ott'). This was FIAT under license in Spain – starting in the 1960s – long before Volkswagen took control of SEAT. Thus it is the SEAT 600, the SEAT 850 Spyder, the SEAT 127, etc.

=== Build quality ===
For all the complexity of origins of the models, however, the products were uniformly of very high quality. Most were done in a refined and handsome manner, with evenly applied colors. The paint application was often in a brighter, almost spectraflame (though that is a Mattel term) appearance. There were many opening features and hoods, trunks, and doors matched the bodies with satisfying precision. Finished parts were thin and svelte and models appear much like Solido – not heavy-handed like some British Dinkys and Corgis.

Tyres were rubber and wheels authentically matched each model – where a generic one was necessary, a handsome wire wheel was employed similar to those seen on Politoys M Series. Sometimes the chemical reaction in the rubber compound of the wheels could cause melting of the plastic on the base plates of the display cases, but unlike Sablon diecast made in Belgium (which also had Spanish associations) whose plastic wheels all melted with contact with rubber tyres, the problem was avoided on Pilen models by using metal wheels.

These models did not appear rushed into production, though some have experienced cracking of faulty zinc alloy conglomerate 15 to 20 years later. Pilen in the mid-1970s was right up with other 1:43 scale companies packaging their models in clear plastic display cases. The screws used to hold models to the orange and yellow plastic bases, however, held them tightly and the tyres often melt and become fused to the plastic of the bases. This is due to a chemical reaction to a softener in the rubber of the tyres. With a bit of coaxing, usually the tyres pull free from the base with no damage.

Typical Pilen brochures were thin narrow folded strips 1 3/4 inches wide which normally advertised thirty cars. On the opposite side, the collector was reminded that five of these strips could be collected and remitted to receive a key chain from "Escuderia" Pilen – such diecast trinkets had been traditional Pilen products for some years. Auto Pilen models were the main diecast toys seen in Spanish department stores El Corte Ingles and Galerias Preciados in Spain in the late 1970s.

== Complex origins ==
=== The Last Dinky ===
Pilen's model selection appears taken (whether by direct copying from blueprints or through available dies) from a variety of other producers, especially French Dinky Toys. Some tools from Meccano s.a. were transferred from Calais to Pilen in Spain so the models made by Pilen were Dinky castings – the base plate of which had been modified from MADE IN FRANCE to MADE IN SPAIN. For example, the Talbot/Simca/Chrysler 1100 saloon, Renault 12 saloon, Mercedes 250 coupe, Ferrari P5, Citroën CX Pallas, and Matra-Simca Bagheera were French Dinky castings. Later versions of these cars, though, did not say Dinky anywhere on the base plates.

So, from 1974 until 1981, several French Dinky Toys passenger cars were made by Pilen. Bickford says that originally there was an agreement to market the French Dinkys in Spain, but most were sold under the Pilen brand name. The French dies were used, but of course the base plates were altered, hiding that fact. These cars were almost exactly similar to the French dies, but with Pilen's own paint finishes. Some were modified and updated by Pilen such as the Citroën DS 23 or the Renault 16 and were sold either under the marque Dinky or Pilen with distinct base plates and packaging. It could be said that these were the last genuine Dinky Toys, though Gardiner and O'Neill show two complete pages of "Dinky, Spain" without ever mentioning Auto Pilen!

Dinkys made in Spain were made available to the French market. The last six Dinky issued in 1980 were Pilen models fitted with a Dinky base plate.

They were :

- 11500 Citroën 2CV
- 11539 Volkswagen Scirocco
- 11540 Renault 14
- 11541 Ford Fiesta
- 11542 Simca 1308 GT
- 11543 Opel Ascona

=== Corgi, Solido and Politoys ===
The Oldsmobile Toronado, the 1963 Corvette Stingray, the experimental Chevrolet Corvette-like Astro 1 and the Adams Probe all appear to have been recastings of previous British Corgi models. Though Tekno also made a Toronado and Pilen's Toronado had opening doors similar to the Tekno, the general look and opening headlights appear more like the Corgi.

Several Pilen models were dead ringers for French Solidos such as the De Tomaso Mangusta which Dinky also made, but Pilen's version was more refined like the Solido, while the Dinky was rather thick and distorted. Pilen's Opel Manta was likely a Solido replica, as well as the Mercedes-Benz C111 rotary concept. Pilen had a Porsche Carrera 6 race car like Corgi and Solido, but the details of the Pilen model match the Solido.

A couple other models appear to be copies of previous Politoys models of Italy: the Ferrari Modulo Pininfarina and the Lancia Stratos Bertone. The American Ford GT Mark II is very similar to the Mebetoys (also of Italy) version, and the SEAT (FIAT) 850 Spyder is like the earlier Mercury, another Italian model producer. The company's Chevrolet Corvair Monza open cockpit concept is a doppelganger of the Danish Tekno issue. It seems either Pilen had direct access to dies of many toy makers (which does not seem very likely), or it had superior skills in creating new castings closely matching various existing vehicles – perhaps with the help of blueprints.

=== Other contributions ===
A few models have mysterious origins. The AMC Javelin doesn't seem to have a counterpart elsewhere and neither does the Intermeccanica Indra or the Monteverdi Hai 450, though models of all of these appeared afterward made by different manufacturers. One possibility is that these were new French Dinky castings that had not appeared elsewhere and were to be introduced when the 'Spanish Dinky' line was to premier. Considering the care and quality seen in many of the Auto Pilen models, it is also possible that a few models were done in-house.

Auto Pilen also made a line of Matchbox-sized 1/64 scale cars, but these are more rare. Besides a SEAT 131 Wagon, a SEAT Ritmo, a Renault 4F (Van), a Peugeot 504, and a Range Rover – among others – were made but little is known about them. The Range Rover casting was shared with Guiloy which brings us to the subject of Pilen's connections to other Spanish diecasters.

== Company interconnections ==
Pilen maintained a close association with other Spanish toy makers also headquartered in Alicante like Joal, Guiloy, Guisval, and Mira as seen with a similar casting of the Pilen Adams Probe as a Joal model, and the appearance of a Citroën CX which had earlier appeared as a Mira. Pilen's clean Maserati Ghibli, which may have come from an earlier French Norev Jet Car, also appeared as a Guiloy. The Renault 17 sport coupe also looks to be a knockoff of a Norev. Pilen's SEAT 600 was also boxed as a Guisval. The Ferrari 512 S Modulo showcar was a casting from Italian Mercury. Bickford also reports that the Javelin, SEAT 124 Coupe and the Monteverdi Hai castings made their way to the Venezuelan company of Juguinsa when Pilen was through with them.

Around 1980 there was a Pilen connection with Holland OTO, which had taken over Dutch Efsi Toys. A 1980 Auto Pilen catalog shows many of the revered Efsi vehicles like the Model T series and many Efsi trucks continued as a line Pilen 1980. Around 1990, there was also a connection with the Dutch diecast company AHC which appears to have bought Holland Oto and thus Auto Pilen. AHC has since shared dies and traditionally Pilen stamped cars can be found in both AHC and Holland OTO labeled boxes.

AHC, however, usually produced Volvos, of which Pilen only had a few: the DAF based 66, the 480 Turbo, and the 460 and 850 sedans – most of these appear to have been developed first by AHC models before they were reverse marketed – and then also later sold as Pilens – some of which were made in Spain. Some of these Volvos also appear to have been sold as promotional models. There were also some Nissans made by AHC/Doorkey packaged as Pilens.

== Legacy ==
With the bankruptcy of Doorkey in the early 1990s, Auto Pilen disappeared. The last new models with the Pilen name appeared at this time. In its time, Auto-Pilen was known for knock-offs and die-cast. Perusal of the model lineup shows castings were very similar to vehicles from several different companies. Models were crafted in a professional and uniform-looking range from leftover castings that had previously been in use elsewhere. Pilen appears to have been the most successful company ever at using second hand castings – yet so very nicely reconfigured.

== Bibliography ==
- Bickford, Keith (2009). "Bickford's Diecast Oddities - Auto Pilen". Bickford Diecast Research Center.
- Bras, Jorge (2012). Pilen Catalogo 1980. Photobucket member profile.
- Dujardin, Jacques (2020). Encyclopedia Dinky Toys. (CD). Review in Planet Diecast.
- Force, Dr. Edward. 1988. Dinky Toys. Atglen, Pennsylvania: Schiffer Publications.
- Gardiner, Gordon; O'Neill, Richard (1996). The Collector's Guide to Toy Cars: An International Survey of Tinplate and Diecast Cars from 1990. Random House. ISBN 978-0517159774.
- Johnson, Dana (1998). Collector's Guide to Diecast Toys and Scale Models (2nd ed.). Padukah KY: Collector Books.
- Sinclair, David (1979). "Scale 1:43, a Survey for Collectors". Automobile Quarterly. Vol. 17, no. 4. Automobile Quarterly in association with the Princeton Institute for Historic Research.
- Willoughby, Brian (February 2002). "Land Rover in Miniature, part 2". Tales of Toy Cars.
