= The Gay Dog =

1954 British film by Maurice Elvey

- Directed by: Maurice Elvey
- Written by: Peter Rogers
- Based on: The Gay Dog by Joseph Colton
- Produced by: Ernest Gartside
- Starring: Wilfred Pickles; Petula Clark; Megs Jenkins; Peter Butterworth; Jon Pertwee
- Cinematography: James Wilson
- Edited by: Stanley Willis
- Music by: Edwin Astley
- Production company: Coronet Films
- Distributed by: Eros Films
- Release date: 22 July 1954
- Running time: 87 minutes
- Country: United Kingdom
- Language: English

The Gay Dog is a 1954 British comedy film directed by Maurice Elvey and starring Wilfred Pickles, Petula Clark and Megs Jenkins. The screen-play was by Peter Rogers based on the 1952 play of the same title by Joseph Colton; also starring Pickles and Jenkins, it had run at London's Piccadilly Theatre for 276 performances from June 1952 to February 1953.

== Plot ==
A miner, Jim Gay, owns a greyhound, "Raving Beauty", which has been very successful in races at the local stadium called Rodney Park. His bets on the dog are not winning him much money, so Gay hits upon a plan to improve its starting odds so as to win more money.

His friend Peter (a fellow miner) and he initially pretend that Raving Beauty is ill, and the rumours soon spread around the local community. Upon visiting the vicar, however, Jim and Peter find out that the vicar is looking after his brother's greyhound, called Prince of Erin, which is due to compete in the same race as Raving Beauty on the Saturday. Peter attempts to find out more about Prince of Erin and forms a relationship with the vicar's daughter Peggy. He eventually finds out that Prince of Erin has good form from Shelbourne Park and his breeding bloodlines relate to Mick the Miller. Jim and Peter then tell the local community that Raving Beauty is fit and well because they know Prince of Erin is most likely to win and want a better starting price.

Meanwhile, Jim's daughter Sally is attending the Women's Institute to avoid Peter, who is also her unwanted suitor. There, she meets and falls in love with a final-year medical student who is lecturing the group on first aid.

On race day, Jim and Peter bet Prince of Erin at odds of 7-1, whilst the local community (who would normally bet on Raving Beauty) bet on Raving Beauty where the odds are still 1-1. Both greyhounds perform well, but Prince of Erin wins. The local community realise that Jim and Peter knew more, which results in Jim getting a black eye. Jim has won enough money from the bookmakers, though, to take a taxi home, give the vicar a donation for his charities, and pay back four family members their stake money.

Meanwhile, Peter offers to be the best man at Sally's wedding and goes off with Peggy.

The film ends with a Jim and Maggie going on holiday to Blackpool in a new motor car with Jim sitting in the back with Raving Beauty. A subplot has Jim's daughter and the vicar's son get engaged to be married.

== Cast ==
- Wilfred Pickles as Jim Gay
- Petula Clark as Sally Gay
- Megs Jenkins as Maggie Gay, Jim's wife
- Harold Goodwin as Bert Gay
- Nuna Duvey as Minnie Gay
- John Blythe as Peter Nightingale
- Margaret Barton as Peggy Gowland (vicar's daughter)
- Russell Enoch as Leslie Gowland (vicar's son)
- Cyril Raymond as Rev Gowland the vicar
- Peter Butterworth as betting man
- Jon Pertwee as betting man

== Production ==
The film was shot at the Riverside Studios in Hammersmith with sets designed by the art director Cedric Dawe. It features Petula Clark singing "A Long Way to Go", written by Joe Henderson and Leslie Clark (Petula's father).

The greyhound racing scenes were shot mainly at Belmont Stadium in Durham, an independent track (unaffiliated to a governing body). However the final race actually shows the greyhounds racing around two different tracks, Belmont and a much larger unidentified stadium (possibly New Cross). The portrayal of 1950s independent greyhound racing is reasonably accurate.

== Critical reception ==
The Monthly Film Bulletin wrote: "This unimaginative film version of Wilfred Pickles' stage success has gained little from the transference, apart from the use of authentic locations which give an impression of realism. Wilfred Pickles presents an interesting character study of a hard-working miner, whilst retaining his customary mannerisms. Petula Clark gives a sensitive performance."

Today's Cinema wrote: "Pretty Petula Clark is as fresh as ever and gives a well-ironed performance. In Russell Enouch (who later changed his name to William Russell) she has a romantic partner with good looks, modest charm and considerable ability."

TV Guide wrote: "comic situations abound but fall far short in the execution, which is surprising coming from eminently competent director Elvey."
