= Ask Pickles =

Quiz game

Ask Pickles was a board game made in the United Kingdom from 1948 by Tower Press, and popular in the 1950s. It consisted of two card games, "Ask Pickles", a quiz card game featuring film, television and radio trivia for 2-4 players, and "Happy Families". Named after radio performer Wilfred Pickles (1900-1978), the game had 29 cards with varying scores of 5 points (yellow), 10 points (red) or 20 points (blue).

== TV show ==
Ask Pickles is a TV programme that aired on the BBC Television Service from 1954 to 1956, hosted by Pickles, similar to a later Jim'll Fix It. BBC publicity said of the show "It doesn't matter how old you are, you can still make your own special dream come true if you get in touch with Wilfred Pickles. Maybe you want to feed a lion or pat a giraffe on the tiny top of his head; or perhaps you'd rather see the lovely lights of London reflected on the Thames, or ride pillion on a motor bike. Maybe you want to meet a film star or you might even want to have a fight-all right! Just ask Wilfred Pickles. He'll try to fix it for you."
