= Efsi Toys =

Dutch toy company

Holland Oto
- Formerly: Bestbox (1959–71); Efsi (1971–96)
- Founded: 1959; 67 years ago
- Headquarters: Weert, Netherlands
- Products: Diecast scale model cars, commercial vehicles
- Website: hollandoto.nl

Holland Oto is a Dutch manufacturing company based in Weert that produces diecast scale model cars and trucks. The company was established in 1959 in Heerlen as "Bestbox", then changed its name to "Efsi" in 1971, and "Holland Oto" in 1996.

The company could be considered the Matchbox Toys of the Netherlands, but its origins and purpose as a government sponsored employer was far less commercial than other toy manufacturers. Efsi was based in Heerlen, Netherlands.

== History ==
In 1959 (some sources say 1962), Bestbox started making simple diecast cars in Limburg province. In the 1960s, the coal mines in Limburg closed. Some significant post-mining industries where workers relocated were automobile producers DAF and Nedcar in Born. After the closure, DSM (The Dutch State Mines) tried providing new employment to out-of-work or disabled miners in different shops or factories. These 'WIM' workshops (Workshop for Disabled Miners) were backed by a national Fund for Social Institutions (FSI).

One of the activities was to continue the production of Best-box models. Later the name was changed to EFSI, apparently a phonetic pronunciation of FSI. The Bestbox name was discontinued in 1971, perhaps because of the similarity to the name (and competition) of Matchbox toys. Though similar to Matchbox, and popular locally, Efsi toys do not seem to have been too well known outside the Netherlands. Most Efsi products were marked "Made in Holland" (as opposed to 'Made in the Netherlands') on the base.

=== Early offerings ===
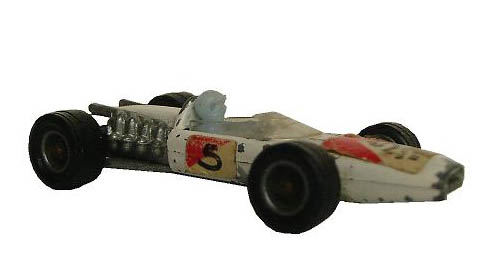
B.R.M. Formula 1 race car. This car, in the F1 series was the first to be made by Efsi. Previously they had been sold under the "Bestbox" label – a name reminiscent of "Matchbox"

Among EFSI's first vehicles were a set of 1960s Formula One cars including Ferrari, Brabham, Honda, Lotus, and Cooper Maserati. These were first marketed under the Best Box name and had realistic engines, thick black tires and realistic, solid appearing, deep-set wheels. Several other vehicles were also marketed under the Best Box label, like a Citroen Dyan sedan. Another popular line were a very Matchbox-like series of diecast bodied Ford Model T vehicles in various forms including coupe, sedan, pickup, delivery van, delivery van in fire engine livery (with ladder), tanker, and wrecker truck. Some Model T versions had diecast bases, but plastic bodies. Overall, Best Box models were simple but attractive, though not as detailed or precise as Matchbox toys. These early Best Box models, were later cast with the Efsi name up to about 1980 or maybe a little longer. The Model T delivery van was made in several liveries like Harrod's, Cadbury, and George Travis wholesale confectioner. Even later, many Efsi vehicles were replicated by Spain's Auto Pilen.

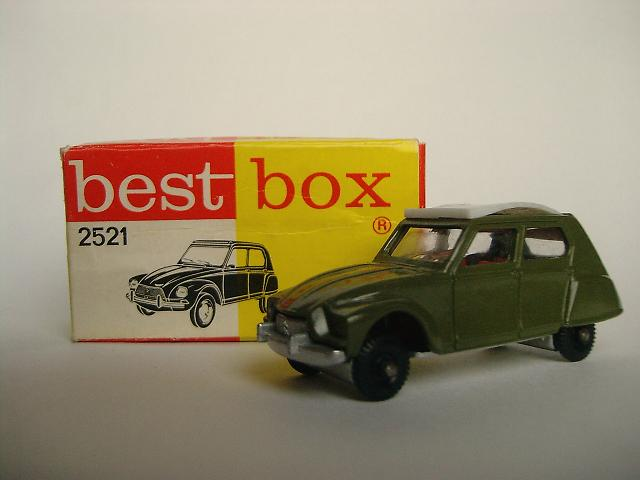
An early Best Box Citroen Dyane sedan. Note the simple unadorned plastic wheels. Note the strangely shaped headlights

Other cars, like a Jaguar XKE convertible, BMW coupe, and a Citroën DS ambulance were also made. Many EFSI cars were a bit smaller than those made by Matchbox and some dies seemed very close to Matchbox – like the Mercedes-Benz 280 convertible and a Mercedes-Benz flat bed truck. One earlier Ford Transit van casting appears similar to one made by Zylmex around 1990, so EFSI appears to have participated in the common practice of buying tooling and also selling it to companies in other countries.

=== HO trucks ===
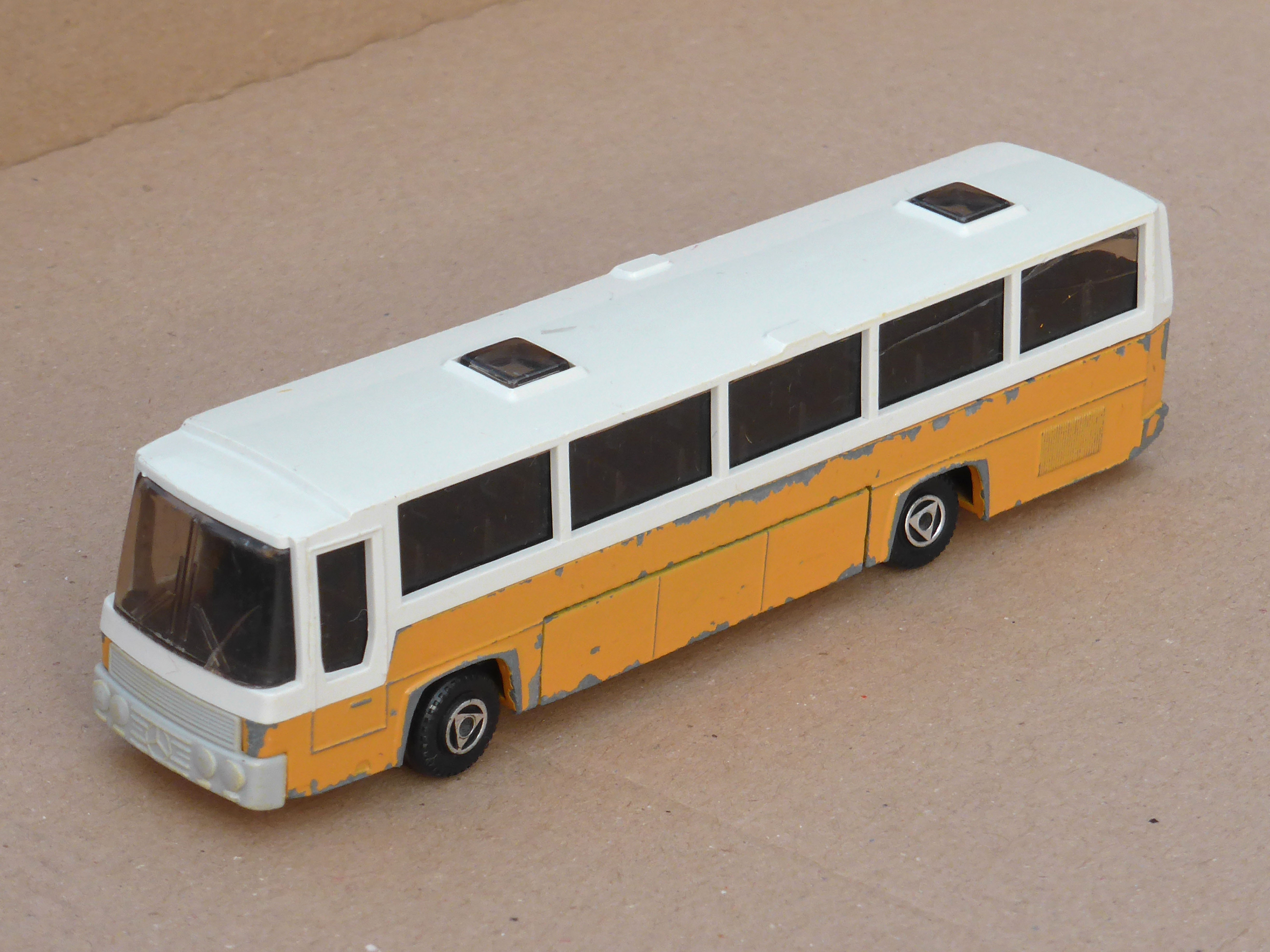
A Efsi HO scale bus

Many Efsi dies were made by a company in Portugal, though models themselves were made in the Netherlands. In the 1980s, EFSI became known for its HO scale truck and bus lines. Early trucks were Dutch DAFs but a Mercedes-Benz cab (long and short wheelbase) and a Commer van were also common. Varied liveries were seen, often of Dutch or mainland European products like Philips, KLM airlines, Miele appliances, Intertrans Freight Logistics, and Libeltex nonwoven materials. Other international companies like Exxon Escorenes, Pirelli, Hurlimann Beer, Chiquita Bananas, and Safeway Foods were also done. One truck, a FIAT van with sliding side door was often seen with automobile ads (FIAT or Citroen) or with Police or 'Gendarmerie', according to language. Just as often, though, trucks were produced clean, without any livery at all. One bus, a Bova Futura, was made in at least 15 different liveries.

Early trucks were produced with a basic unadorned black wheel design, while later ones incorporated a triangular chrome wheel that looked a lot like a Majorette design. Packaging in the 1980s was simple as trucks were held in flimsy plastic containers with an EFSI identification sticker on the lower side of the container. Later, more design and color was incorporated on a cardboard blister, but, still, the presentation was simpler than more developed diecast companies – no printing was usually seen on the back of the blister card. One interesting aspect of packaging was the eight sided STOP sign in red seen on the blister packages for EFSI Toys. The sign, which says "code" right next to it, seems to be a warning that the toy is unsafe for children under a certain age. Most EFSI toys were stamped 'Holland' or 'Made in Holland'. Blister packs for smaller trucks and cars were variously marked as Efsi RevWheels, Efsi Toppers, or Efsi Plus.

=== Holland Oto ===
In 1996, apparently when the disabled miner program was discontinued, the company was taken over by Vincent Nies and its name changed to "Holland Oto", which is still in operation, making contemporary models of trucks, buses, and agricultural vehicles. Today, Holland-Oto is headquartered in Weert, just southeast of Eindhoven, but north of the Heerlen home of the former Efsi establishment in Limburg. While earlier Efsi packaging was either white or yellow or some combination of the two, the Holland Oto vehicles were generally the same products, but now in a blue and orange package.

Holland Oto had connections with Dutch AHC, and thus today has connections to the JOAL and Pilen enterprises in Spain. For example, in 1980, Pilen S.A. introduced new vehicles. These were the former Model Ts rebadged and some of the typical Efsi HO trucks – though re-engineered by Pilen with that company's considerable talent for diecast refinement. Besides Joal, today Holland-Oto is affiliated with or owns Universal Hobbies, Motorart diecast cars and construction vehicles, HiSpeed diecast classic vehicles, and Kids' Globe Farming toys.
