= The Gay Dog (play) =

1951 play

- Original language: English
- Written by: Joseph Colton
- Genre: Comedy

Premiere
- Date: 13 February 1951
- Place: Q Theatre, Kew Bridge

The Gay Dog is a 1951 comedy play by the British author Joseph Colton. After its London premiere at the Q Theatre in Kew Bridge (under the title A Dog for Delmont it transferred to the Piccadilly Theatre in the West End where it ran for 276 performances between 11 June 1952 and 7 February 1953. The West End cast included Wilfred Pickles, Megs Jenkins, Harold Goodwin, Anthony Oliver, Brian Nissen, David King-Wood and Joan Hickson.

== Film adaptation ==
In 1954 it was adapted into a film of the same title directed by Maurice Elvey and starring Pickles and Jenkins alongside Petula Clark and Peter Butterworth.

== Bibliography ==
- Goble, Alan. The Complete Index to Literary Sources in Film. Walter de Gruyter, 1999.
- Wearing, J.P. The London Stage 1950–1959: A Calendar of Productions, Performers, and Personnel. Rowman & Littlefield, 2014.
