= Tower Press =

British jigsaw puzzle and game manufacturer

- Parent: Waddingtons

Tower Press was a British jigsaw puzzle and games manufacturer, most active from the 1930s until 1969 when they were bought by Waddingtons. By the early 1960s, they were the largest jigsaw puzzle maker in the world.

== History ==
The company had its origins in the Isle of Man. They began making cardboard wearings in the 1930s but were best known for their jigsaw puzzles and later children's games. They made a jigsaw puzzle range named "Riders of the Range", and also made games such as Ask Pickles (1948), Inspector Brown, and many others. By the early 1960s they were the world's largest maker of jigsaw puzzles. They purchased Budgie Toys, which was said to also be a serious competitor to the Dinky and Corgi lines in the 1960s. In 1969, shortly before the acquisition by Waddingtons, Tower Press were cited as "the most impressive example of the QE2's selling power" when they sold over 150,000 jigsaw puzzles of Queen Elizabeth II and were expected to sell a further 50,000.
