= Megs Jenkins =

English actress (1917–1998)

- Born: Muguette Mary Jenkins; 21 April 1917; Birkenhead, Cheshire, England
- Died: 5 October 1998 (aged 81); Felixstowe, Suffolk, England
- Occupation: Actress
- Years active: 1939–1990
- Spouse: George Routledge (m. 1943; div. 1959)

Muguette Mary "Megs" Jenkins (21 April 1917 – 5 October 1998) was an English character actress who appeared in British films and television programmes.

== Life and career ==
Jenkins was born in Birkenhead, Cheshire, the daughter of a construction engineer.

She originally trained to be a ballet dancer. Although born in England, she often played Welsh characters. She made her noticeable film debut in Millions Like Us (1943) as the Welsh room-mate and confidante of the main character (played by Patricia Roc). She went on to appear in such films as Green for Danger (1946), The History of Mr. Polly (1949), The Cruel Sea (1953), and Oliver! (1968). She played the housekeeper, Mrs. Grose, in two adaptations of Henry James's The Turn of the Screw: the film The Innocents (1961) and a 1974 television adaptation. She also frequently played comedic roles, and in later life was a regular in the sitcom Oh No It's Selwyn Froggitt, and the children's series Worzel Gummidge.

From 1933, Jenkins also had a long stage career, and appeared in several plays by Emlyn Williams including The Light of Heart in 1940. In 1952 she appeared in the comedy play The Gay Dog in the West End and reprised her role in the 1954 film version. In 1953 she appeared in the long-running A Day by the Sea by N.C. Hunter. In 1956, she won the Clarence Derwent Award for Best Supporting performance in Arthur Miller's A View from the Bridge.

Megs Jenkins's 1943 marriage to George Routledge, a commando who had been a childhood classmate, and who renewed their acquaintance when he saw her name in a review, ended in divorce in 1959.

== Filmography ==
=== Film ===
Year	Title	Role	Notes	Ref.
1939	The Silent Battle	Louise	Released as Continental Express in USA	
1939	Secret Journey	Reception girl in glasses	Uncredited	
1939	Poison Pen	Barmaid		
1939	Inspector Hornleigh on Holiday	Maid	Uncredited	
1943	Millions Like Us	Gwen		
1943	The Lamp Still Burns	Nurse	Uncredited	
1944	It's in the Bag	Peach St. Clair		
1945	29 Acacia Avenue	Shirley	Released as The Facts of Love in USA	
1945	Painted Boats	Barmaid		
1947	Green for Danger	Nurse Woods		
1947	The Brothers	Angustina McFarish		
1948	Saraband for Dead Lovers	Frau Busche		
1948	The Monkey's Paw	Mrs Trelawne		
1949	The History of Mr. Polly	The Innkeeper		
1949	A Boy, a Girl and a Bike	Nan Ritchie		
1950	No Place for Jennifer	Mrs Marshall		
1950	Mr. Gillie	Mrs Gillie	Live TV drama	
1951	White Corridors	Mrs. Briggs		
1952	Secret People	Penny		
1952	Ivanhoe	Servant to Isaac		
1953	The Cruel Sea	Tallow's sister		
1953	Rough Shoot	Mrs. Powell		
1953	Personal Affair	Vi Vining		
1953	Trouble in Store	Miss Gibson		
1954	The Gay Dog	Maggie Gay		
1955	Out of the Clouds	The Landlady		
1955	John and Julie	Mrs Pritchett		
1957	The Man in the Sky	Mrs. Snowden		
1957	The Passionate Stranger	Millie		
1957	The Story of Esther Costello	Nurse Evans		
1958	Indiscreet	Doris Banks		
1959	Tiger Bay	Mrs Philips		
1959	Jet Storm	Rose Brock		
1959	Friends and Neighbours	Lily Grimshaw		
1960	Conspiracy of Hearts	Sister Constance		
1961	The Green Helmet	Kitty Launder		
1961	The Innocents	Mrs Grose		
1962	The Barber of Stamford Hill	Mrs. Werner		
1962	Life for Ruth	Mrs. Gordon		
1962	The Wild and the Willing	Mrs. Corbett		
1964	Murder Most Foul	Mrs Gladys Thomas		
1965	Bunny Lake Is Missing	Sister		
1967	Stranger in the House	Mrs. Christoforides		
1968	Oliver!	Mrs Bedwin		
1969	The Smashing Bird I Used to Know	Matron		
1972	Asylum	Miss Higgins	(segment: "Lucy Comes to Stay")	
1975	The Amorous Milkman	Iris		

=== Television ===
- Jenny Meade (1951, TV film)
- Dark Summer (1951, TV film)
- Heart to Heart (1962, TV film) – Lady Johnson
- The Human Jungle (1964, Episode, "Conscience on a Rack") – Dr Murphy
- Gideon's Way (1965, episode: "The Wall") – Landlord's wife
- Weavers Green (1966, TV serial)
- David Copperfield (1969, TV film)
- Ben Travers' Farces (1970, 3 episodes)
- The Befrienders (1970, TV film) – Janet
- Jane Eyre (1973, TV serial) – Mrs. Fairfax
- Orson Welles Great Mysteries (1973, TV series, series 1 episode 11: "The Monkey's Paw") – Mrs. White
- Crown Court (1974, episode: "Vermin") – Dr. Bridget Walker
- The Turn of the Screw (1974, TV film) – Mrs. Grose
- Oh No It's Selwyn Froggitt (1976–1977) – Mrs Froggitt
- Worzel Gummidge (1979–1980) Mrs Braithwaite
- Young at Heart (1980–1982, TV sitcom) – Ethel Collyer
- A Woman of Substance (1985 TV film) – Mrs. Turner
