= Dinky Toys =

Die-cast miniature vehicles

Dinky
- Dinky logo used in the late 1960s
- Product type: Scale model vehicles
- Current owner: Mattel (1997–)
- Country: United Kingdom
- Introduced: 1934; 92 years ago in Liverpool
- Related brands: List of model car brands
- Markets: Worldwide
- Previous owners: Meccano Ltd (1934–1964); Triang (1964–1980); Matchbox (1980s–1997)

Dinky Toys was a brand of die-cast zamak zinc alloy scale model vehicles, traffic lights, and road signs produced by British toy company Meccano Ltd. They were made in England from 1934 to 1979, at a factory in Binns Road in Liverpool.

Toy vehicles commercialised under the "Dinky" name include cars, trucks, aircraft, military vehicles, and ships.

== Pre-war history ==
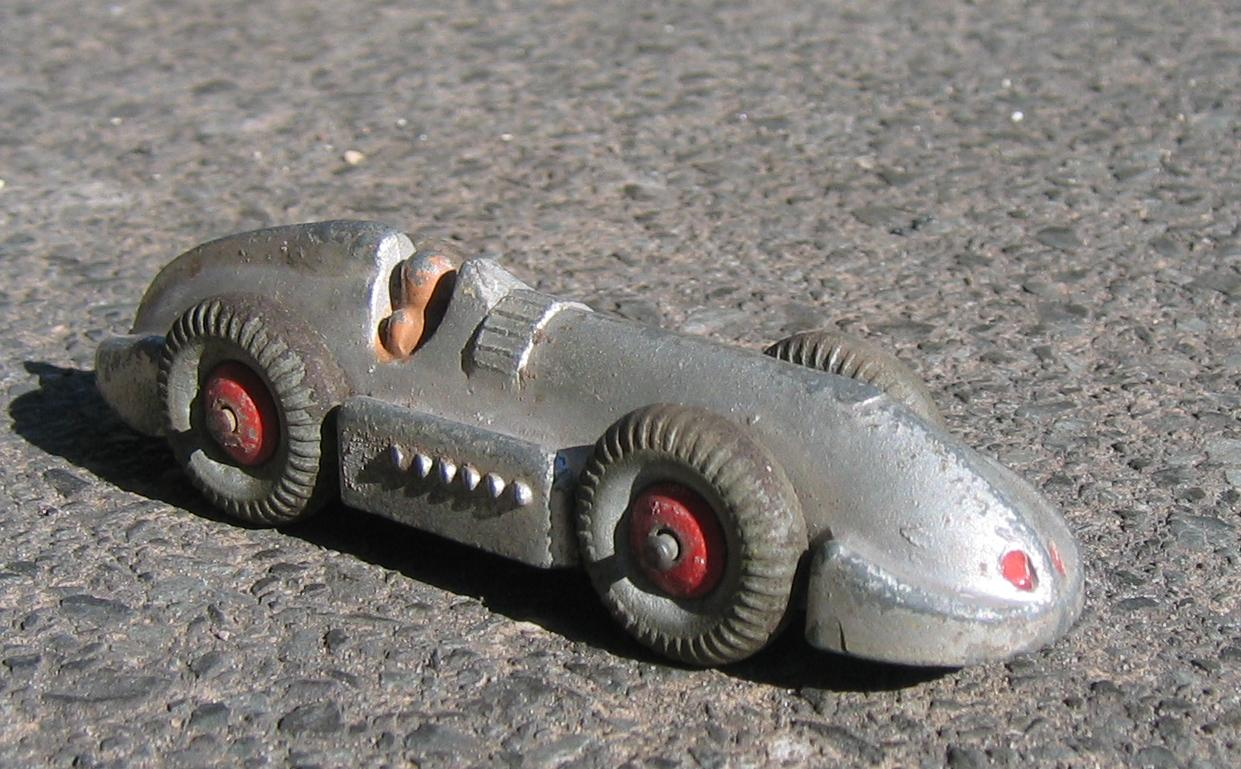
Dinky 23e model of George Eyston's land record car, "Speed of the Wind". The toy was made from 1936 to 1956.

Frank Hornby established Meccano Ltd. in 1908 to make metal construction sets. The company later moved into model railways, with its O gauge clockwork trains appearing in 1920.

In the early 1930s, Meccano made many types of tinplate and other metal cars, such as its Morgan and BSA three-wheelers, mostly in kit form. In 1933, Meccano Ltd issued a series of railway and trackside accessories to complement its O gauge (1/45) Hornby Trains model railway sets. The accessories were first called "Hornby Modelled Miniatures", but in April 1934 issue of Meccano Magazine, they were given the name "Meccano Dinky Toys" for the first time. In August 1935, the name Meccano was dropped and the marque became DINKY TOYS, which lasted until 1971. By December 1934, the Dinky name was also used for the "Dinky Builder" sets, which were coloured flat metal pieces that could be hinged together to make buildings and vehicles.

There are some stories about the origin of the "Dinky" name. One story says it derived from a nickname that a friend gave to Frank Hornby's daughter. Another story is that when one of Hornby's daughters-in-law first saw the models, she called them "dinky", a Scottish word meaning "neat" or "fine".

=== The legacy of vehicles ===
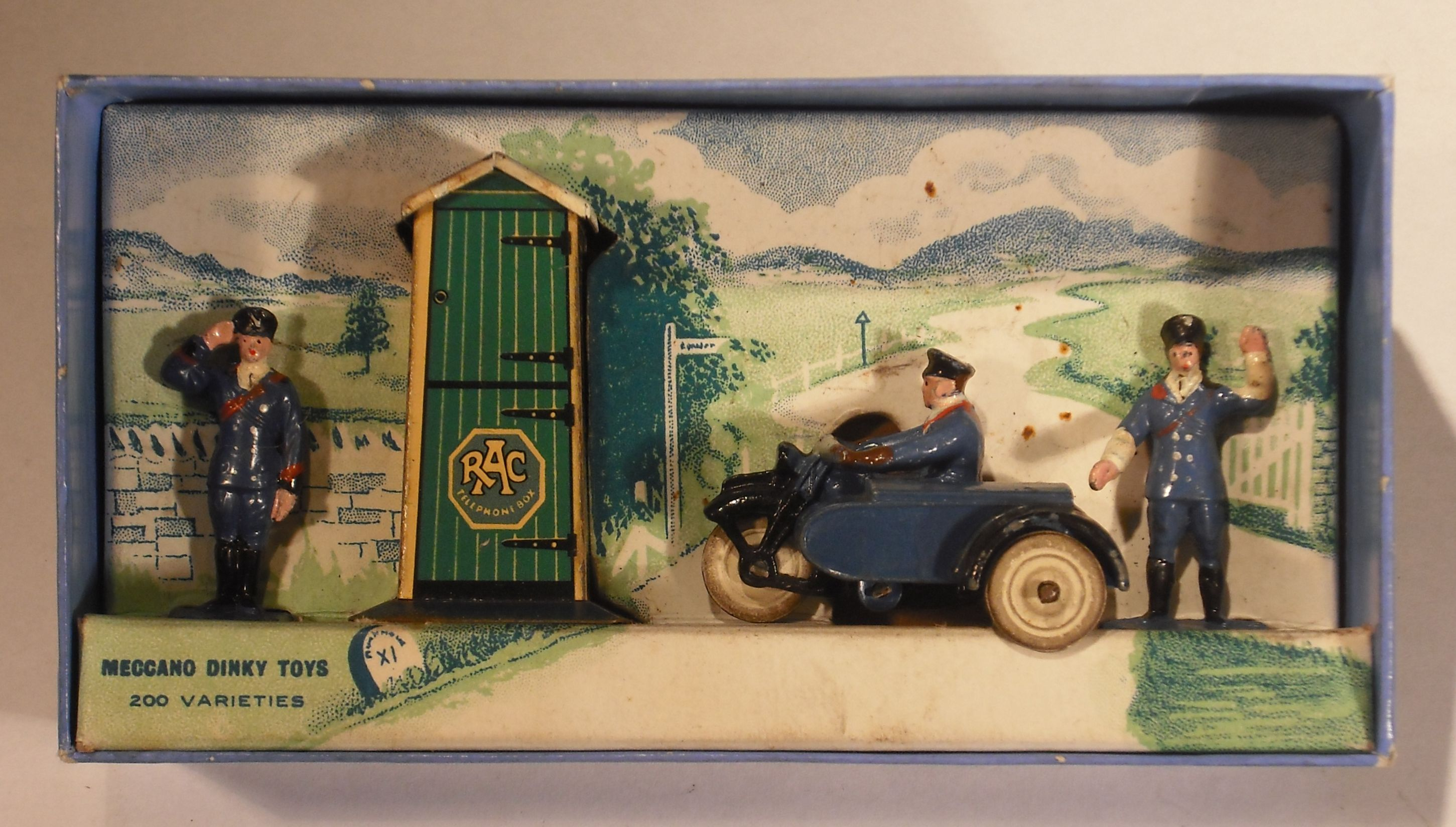
RAC hut and motorcycle patrol, to O scale (about 1:43)

In the mid-1930s, six vehicles were released (designated 22a to f), including a sports car, a sports coupe, a truck, a delivery van, a farm tractor, and a tank, all cast in lead. Soon after, the first Dinky model car, a sports car based on the MG Magic Midget, was made available individually, numbered 23. At that time, a series 24 (a-h) was introduced, which included a generic ambulance (made until the late 1940s), a grand sports open four-seater, a grand sports two-seater, a coupé and a limousine. The 24 series was also made in France.

Some smaller vehicles were produced alongside model track workers, passengers, station staff and other O scale trackside accessories. All of the early cars were inaccurate representations and had die-cast metal bodies and chassis, and wheels with rubber tyres. By August 1935, there were around 200 different products in the Dinky Toys range which included die-cast ships, aeroplanes and small trains. Dinky Toys model cars were available individually in trade packs of six cars per pack. Most models were not made available in individual boxes until 1952.

The number of commercial vehicles expanded with the addition of Series 28, which included many delivery vans. In 1935, a new series 30 was introduced which, for the first time, featured accurate likenesses of specific vehicles. They included a generic ambulance, a Daimler saloon, a Vauxhall saloon, a Chrysler Airflow saloon, and a Rolls-Royce saloon. Smaller Matchbox-sized Austin 7 saloons and tourers were also made. At about the same time, several models were also made and marketed in France. Liveries of well-known companies began to decorate the commercial vehicles.

Series 30 included:

- 30a Chrysler Airflow Saloon (originally no. 32)
- 30b Rolls-Royce
- 30c Daimler
- 30d Vauxhall
- 30e Breakdown car
- 30f Ambulance

In 1938, a new Series 36 was introduced. Most of those models were also made after World War II, up to 1948. Production was halted during the war so that the Binns Road factory in Liverpool could produce many items for the war effort. Meanwhile, models in series 36 included a Rover Saloon, a Bentley 2 seat sports coupé, an Armstrong-Siddeley limousine, a British Salmson 4 seater convertible, a British Salmson 2 seat convertible, and a Humber Vogue coupé. Chassis were cast with open holes, saving expense and metal. Provision was made on some models for the attachment of metal drivers, but not many appeared before the war, making them more valuable.

Dinky had acute problems on early models with zinc pest, also known, incorrectly, as metal fatigue, caused by impure alloys which caused corrosion between molecules, resulting in cracking of the metal, which would crumble prematurely. That was much more common in the years 1938–1941, and is the main reason why it is rare to find surviving toys in good condition from that period. Some early castings have survived in numbers, while others are rare without some form of damage – such as the 28/2 Series vans.

=== Military ===
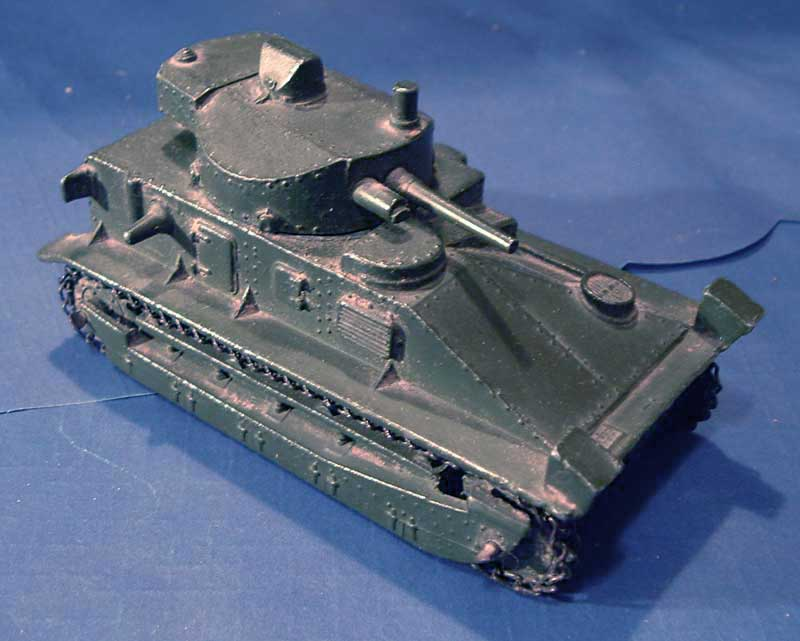
Dinky 151a Medium Tank. This model was made 1937 to 1941 and was reissued from 1947 till 1952, when consumer industry commenced again.

Between 1937 and 1939, a number of military vehicles were introduced, numbered from 151 to 162. They were painted army green, and consisted of a medium and a light tank, an Austin 7 military car, a six-wheeled truck, a reconnaissance car, a searchlight lorry, an anti aircraft gun, a Vickers Light Dragon artillery tractor with a limber and 18-pounder gun. There were also several detailed trailers, including an ammunition trailer, a cooker trailer, and a water tank trailer. The military toys were produced until 1941, though a few select models – the (161b) anti-aircraft gun, the (151a) medium tank, and some of the trailers – were also made again from 1946 to 1955.

Pre-war models were fitted with thin diameter 1.626 mm. (0.064 in.) axles, whereas the post-war axles were 2.032 mm. (0.08 in.). The pre-war hubs were smooth, but after the war there was a raised part in the centre of the hub. Tracks on the tanks and the (162a) Light Dragon artillery tractor were made with a wire-link sprocket chain wrapped around the hubs. That gave a mechanical, although not very realistic, appearance to the tracks. The side panels of the anti-aircraft folded and, not only did the gun swivel 360 degrees² but it could be moved from level to about a 50-degree angle upward. The searchlight was also adjustable in horizontal and vertical directions.

Military models were made until the end of production in the late 1970s. A wide variety of military vehicles were produced, such as the jeep-like Austin Champ, which included a driver and passengers.

=== Aircraft and ships ===
==== Aircraft ====
In the early days of the Dinky Toys range, aeroplanes and ships formed a considerable part of the output of the Binns Road factory, along with models of cars, vans and trucks. Both civilian and military aircraft were subjects for the Dinky Toys modellers, and the model of the Spitfire was sold in a special presentation box between 1939 and 1941, as part of The Spitfire Fund, to raise money for the supply of a real Spitfire to the Royal Air Force. Some models were clearly identified, whereas others re-issued in 1945 had generic names such as Heavy Bomber (66a) and Two Seater Fighter (66c). The reason for that is not clear, but it may have been that they were not true representations of particular aircraft types. However, there were rumours that some models of aircraft and ships were disguised so that enemy agents would not be able to recognise allied aircraft and shipping from the Dinky Toys models. That was of particular importance in the production of French Dinky models, due to the political friction in Europe before the war and the fact that France was occupied by the Axis forces during hostilities. Those theories do not seem to be valid, because the models with generic names were issued in 1945, after hostilities had ceased.

Production of model aircraft resumed after the war with a mixture re-issues of pre-war models, along with models of new civilian airliners and recently introduced jet-powered aircraft. Production of Dinky planes tailed off in 1968, but was resurgent in 1971 with a range of World War II types complete with battery-powered propellers, as well as modern jet fighters, and even a Sea King helicopter. Those large-scale planes had been developed by Airfix but were made by Meccano Ltd., which had recently been bought by Airfix.

The range included:

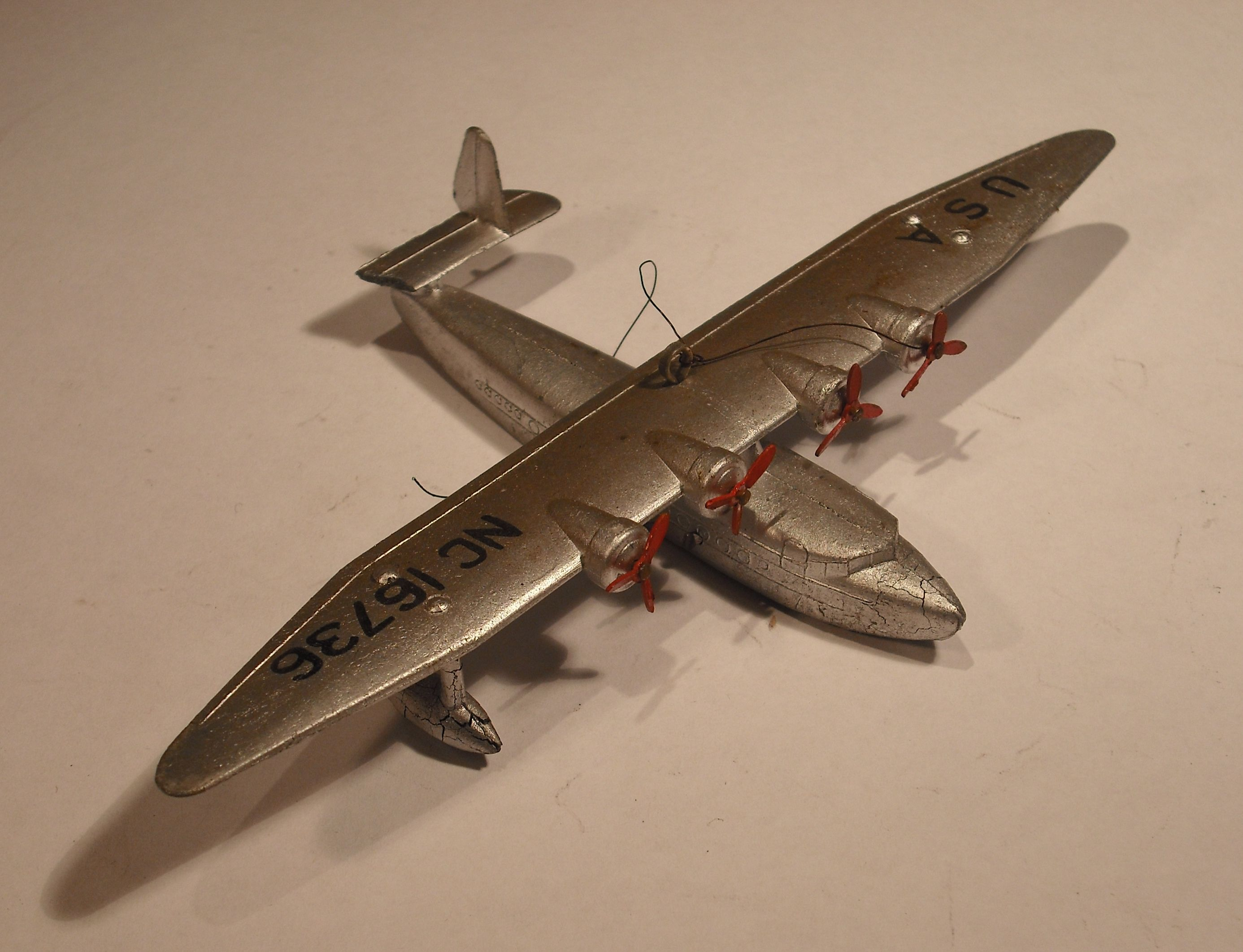
No. 60w Sikorsky S-42, suffering from zinc pest

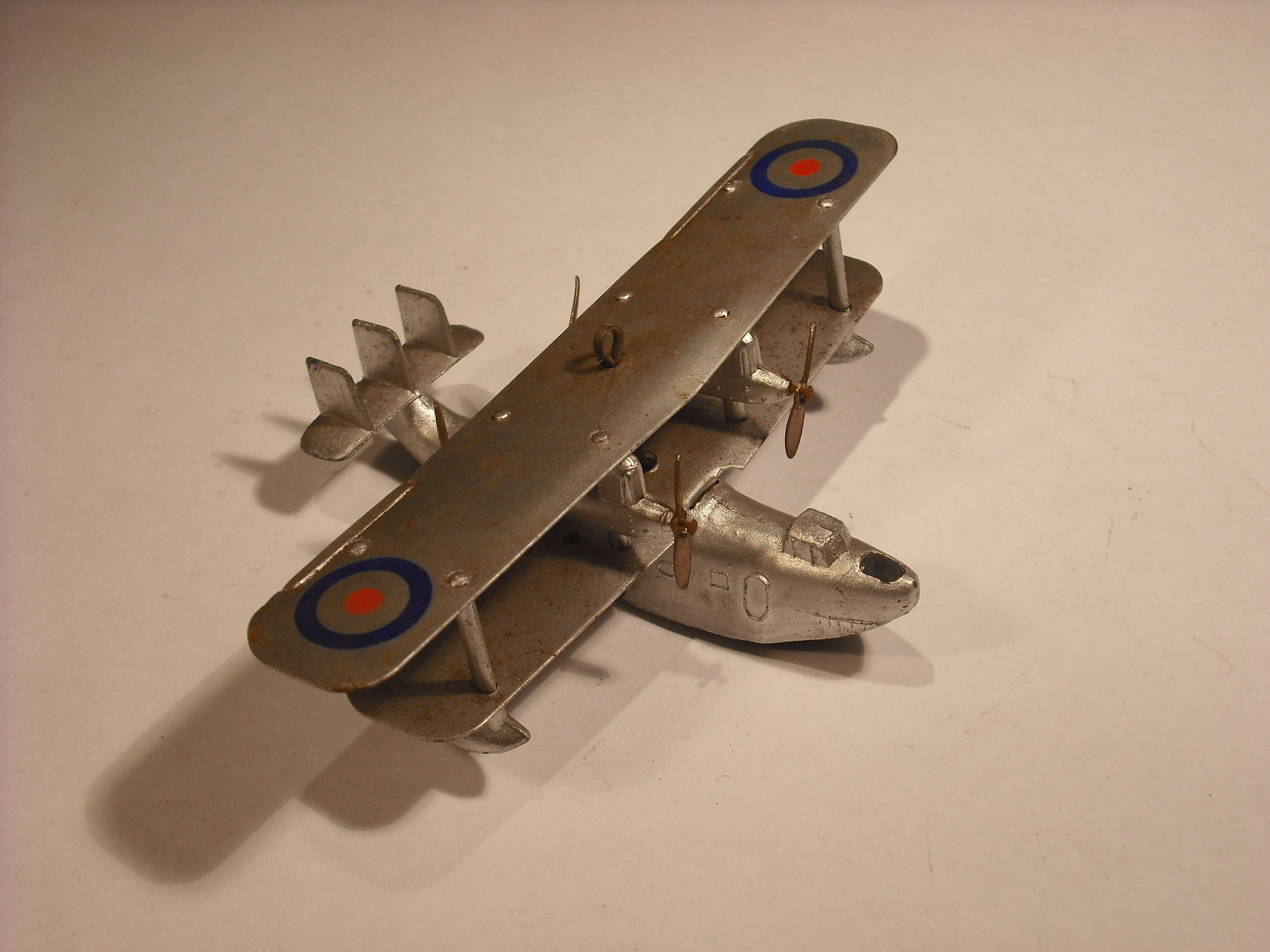
No. 60h. Short Singapore

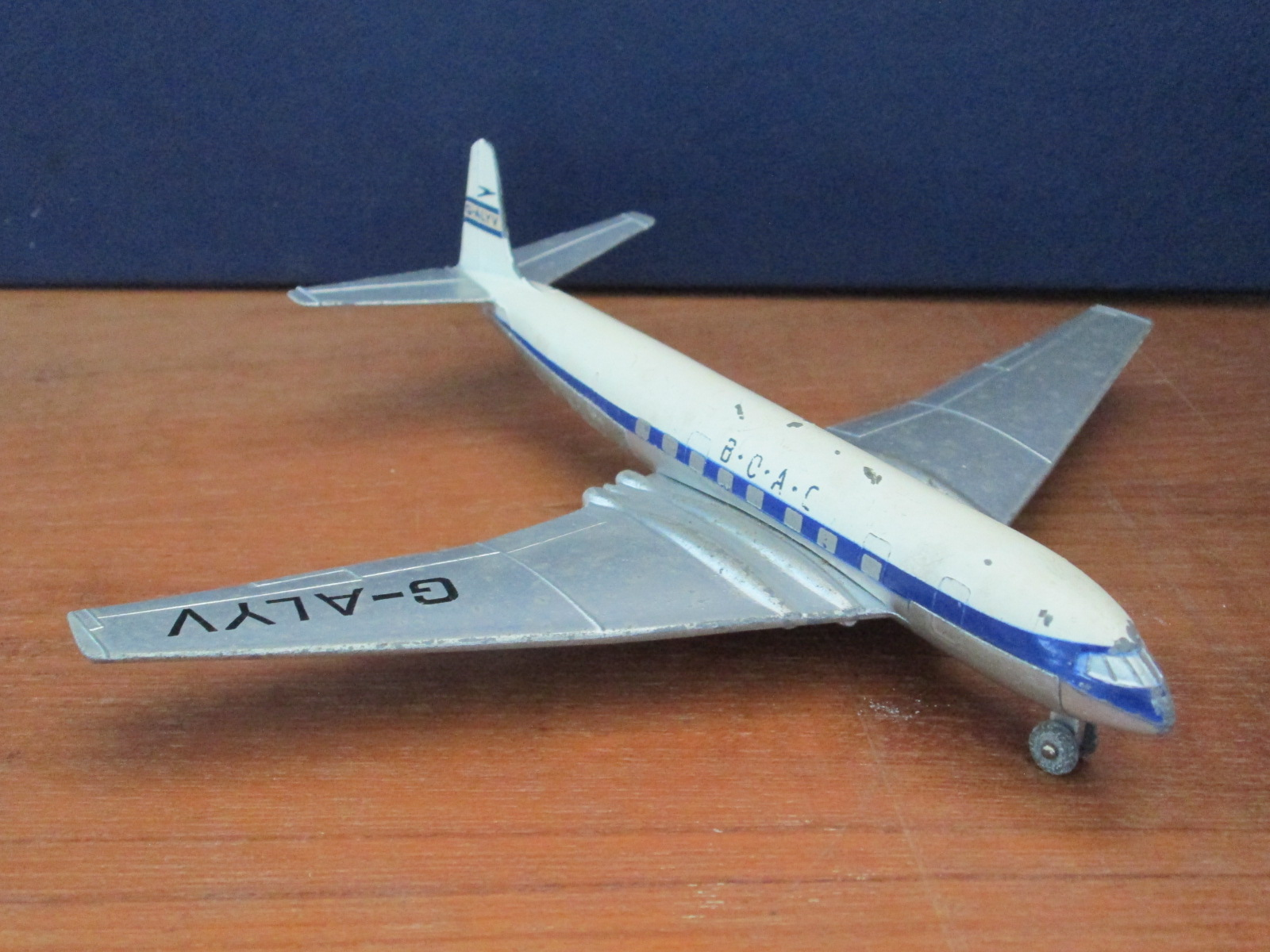
No. 999. De Havilland Comet

- 60a Imperial Airways Liner (Armstrong Whitworth Atalanta) (1934)
- 62a Supermarine Spitfire (1939)
- 60c Percival Gull (1934)
- 60d Sikorsky S58 Helicopter
- 60f Cierva C.30A autogiro
- 60g de Havilland Comet
- 60h Short "Singapore III" flying boat
- 60r Short S 23 Empire flying boat
- 60s Fairey "Battle" bomber (1940–41)
- 60w Clipper III Flying Boat
- 62g Boeing B-17 Flying Fortress (1939)
- 62k The King's Aeroplane
- 62m Airspeed Envoy
- 62p Armstrong Whitworth Ensign
- 62s Hawker Hurricane (1940)
- 62w Imperial Airways Liner Frobisher Class
- 63 Mayo Composite aircraft
- 63b Mercury Sea Plane
- 64a Amiot 370 (1939)
- 64b Bloch 200 (1939)
- 67a Junkers Ju 89 (1941)
- 70a Avro York (1946)
- 70c Vickers Viking (1954)
- 70d Twin Engine Fighter
- 70e Gloster Meteor (1946)
- 70f Lockheed P-80 Shooting Star (1947)
- 701 Short Shetland Flying Boat
- 702 De Havilland Comet BOAC (1954)
- 703 Handley Page Herald (1955)
- 704 Avro York Airliner (1954) – re-issued from 70a
- 705 Vickers Viking – re-issued from 70c
- 706 Vickers Viscount Airliner (1956)
- 707 Avro Vulcan – renumbered as 749 before release
- 708 Vickers Viscount Airliner (BEA) (1957)
- 710 Beechcraft Bonanza S35
- 712 US Army T-42A – retracting undercarriage
- 715 Beechcraft Baron – retracting undercarriage
- 716 Westland Sikorsky S51 Helicopter
- 717 Boeing 737 in Lufthansa Livery
- 731 Twin Engine Fighter – re-issue of 70d
- 730 Hawker Tempest II Fighter
- 732 Gloster Meteor (1946) – re-issue of 70e
- 732 Bell Police Helicopter – same issue number as above (Meteor) – 1974 release
- 733 Lockheed P-80 Shooting Star – re-issue of 70f
- 734 Supermarine Swift (1955)
- 735 Gloster Javelin (1956)
- 736 Hawker Hunter (1955)
- 737 P.1B Lightning Fighter (1959)
- 738 de Havilland Sea Vixen (1960)
- 715 Bristol 173 Helicopter
- 718 Hawker Hurricane Mk IIe (1972)
- 719 Supermarine Spitfire Mk II (1969) – motorised propeller
- 721 Junkers Ju 87 'Stuka' (1969)
- 722 Hawker Siddeley Harrier (1970) – retracting undercarriage
- 723 Hawker Siddeley H.S.125 Executive Jet – retracting undercarriage
- 724 Sea King Helicopter and Apollo Spacecraft Capsule (1971) – motorised main rotor.
- 726 Messerschmitt Bf 109E (1972) – motorised propeller
- 730 US Navy McDonnell Douglas F-4 Phantom (1972)
- 731 SEPECAT Jaguar (1973) – retracting undercarriage
- 749 Avro Vulcan (1955) – boxes marked "992" – "Supertoys" range
- 997 SE 210 Caravelle Airliner (1962) made alternatively in France and in England – "Super toys" range
- 998 Bristol Britannia Airliner (1959)
- 999 Comet Airliner (1956) – re-issue of 702

Although the production of aircraft models continued after the war, the heyday of Dinky ships was between 1934 and 1939. The models, which were 1/1200 to 1/1985 scale, were cast from the same unstable alloy that was used across the entire pre-war Dinky range and have therefore suffered from the metal decay that makes survivors all the more rare. Small metal rollers were also included in the design and concealed in the underside of the hull so that the models could be moved smoothly across surfaces. Mirroring the aircraft range, both civilian and military ships were issued, and again, some were disguised.

==== Ships ====
The liner France was the only Dinky Toys ship produced in France after the war. It was made partly of zamac and partly of plastic, at the scale of 1/1200. It was not until 1976 that five further models were added to the long line of maritime releases from Dinky Toys. Those were in the larger scale of 1/180 – 1/200.

Models in the pre-war range include:

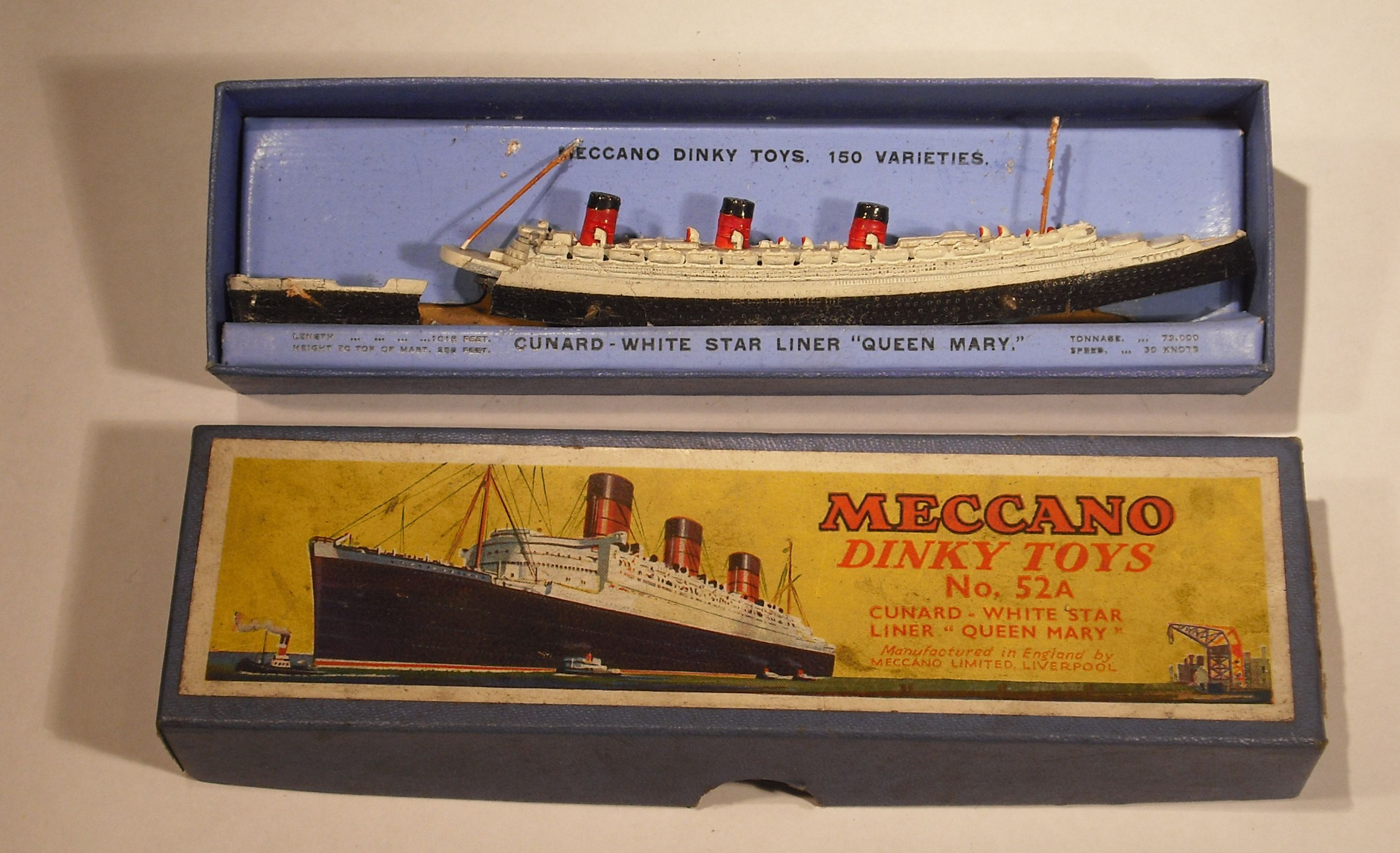
Dinky 52a Cunard White Star Line Queen Mary. The model has significant zinc pest decay.

- 50a HMS Hood
- 50b Battle ship Nelson class
- 50c Cruiser Effingham
- 50d HMS York
- 50e HMS Delhi
- 50f Destroyer Brook class
- 50g K class submarine
- 50h Destroyer Amazon class
- 50k X class submarine
- 51b Norddeutscher Lloyd Europa
- 51c Italia Line Rex
- 51d CPR Empress of Britain
- 51e P & O Strathaird
- 51f Furness Queen of Bermuda
- 51g Cunard White Star Britannic
- 52a Cunard/White Star Queen Mary
- 52c Paquebot La Normandie made in France
- 52c Battleship Dunkerque made in France

== Post-war history ==
No Dinky Toys models were made between 1941 and 1945. The French Meccano factory was occupied by the Germans, some of whom worked for Märklin, and the British factory was on war work but every Christmas a few models would be sold from pre-war stocks. Thus, during and after the war, a few 'pre-war' models survived and were sold in 1945. The first new models released after the war were U.S. military jeeps ref.153a in April 1946 in England and ref. 24M in France, it was the first Dinky Toy made at the scale of 1/43.

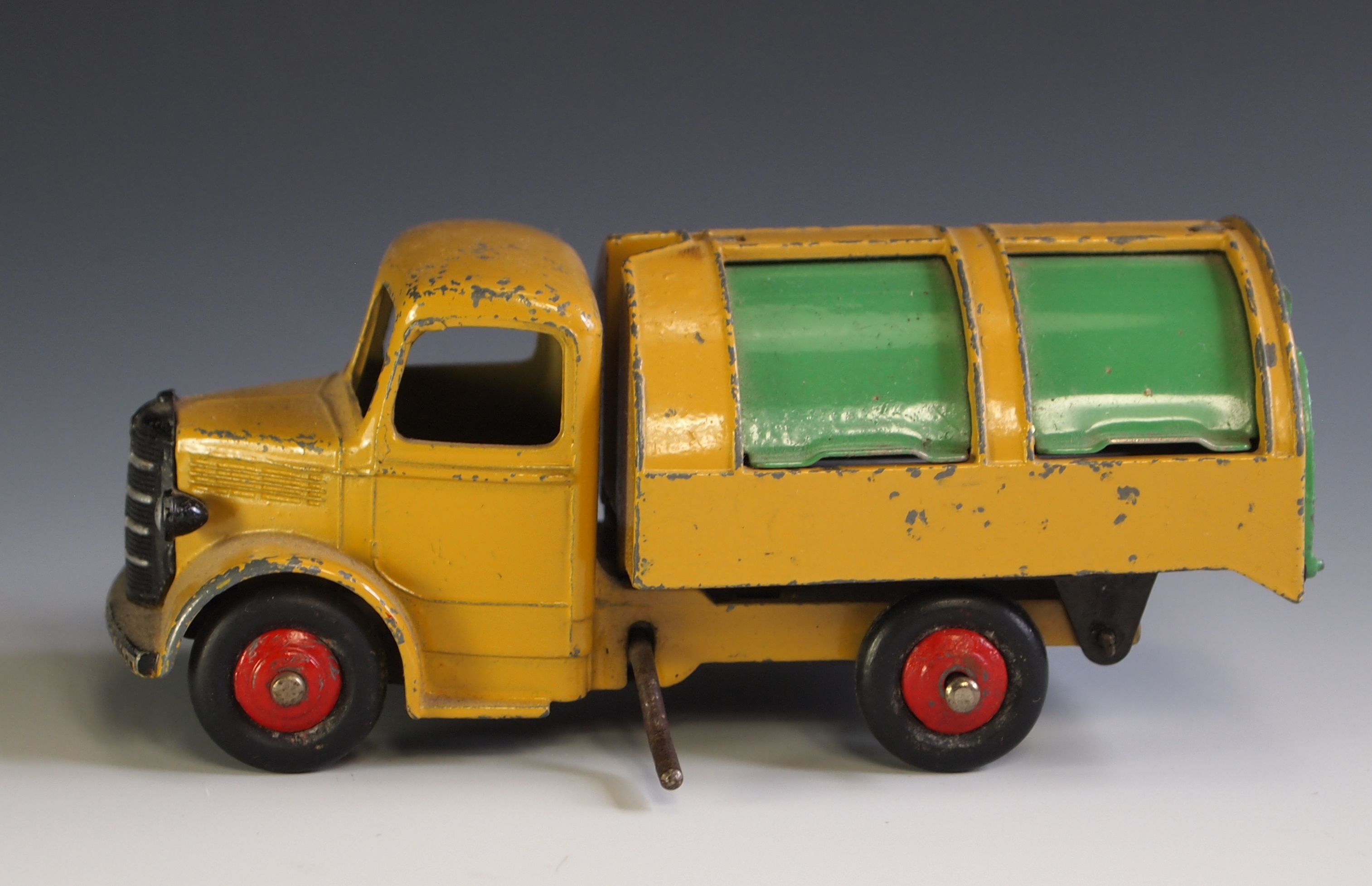
Dinky 0 Series no. 25v Bedford refuse wagon with tipping bed

Besides some of the military vehicles offered before and after the war, the first significant releases from Dinky in the late 1940s were the 40 series, which were all British saloons. The first new model car released was an Armstrong Siddeley Coupe. These were the beginning of what was described as the "golden age" of Dinky Toys in the post-war era and represented far greater accuracy and detail than their pre-war counterparts. These were very popular and today are often considered by collectors to be the quintessential Dinky Toys models. The 40 series cars were manufactured from better quality alloy, meaning that the survival rate is higher and although originally sold in trade boxes of six, they were renumbered in 1954 and re-coloured in two-tone paintwork. In 1956, the Austin Somerset ref. 40j is probably the first model sold in its own individual yellow box. The first two models in the 40 series were in 1:48 scale, while the others were in 1:45 scale. Plans were made for the Jowett Javelin saloon, but the model was never issued. More recently, Odgi Models have remade the Jowett and a couple other Dinky Toys Models which were planned but never manufactured.

The series included :

Number	Model	Year
40a	Riley Saloon	1947
40b	Triumph 1800	1948
40c	Jowett Javelin	Not issued
40d	Austin A40 Devon	1949
40e	Standard Vanguard	1948
40f	Hillman Minx	1951
40g	Morris Oxford	1950
40h	Austin FX3 Taxi	1952
40j	Austin A40 Somerset	1953

=== Dinky Supertoys ===
As part of the post-war development and expansion of the range, in 1947 Meccano Ltd introduced a series of model lorries modelled to the usual Dinky scale of 1:48, and introduced the altered name of Dinky Supertoys. Some models issued in this line included:

Dinky Supertoy No. 923: Big Bedford Van "Heinz" (issued 1955–1958), from a 1960 Dinky Toys catalogue

Number	Model	Year	Re-numbered in 1954
501	Foden 8 Wheel Wagon	1947	901
502	Foden Flat Truck	1947	902
503	Foden Flat Truck with Tailboard	1947	903
504	Foden Tanker 'Mobilgas'	1953	
505	Foden Flat Truck with Chains	1952	905
941	Foden 8 wheel tanker 'Mobilgas'	1953	
942	Foden Tanker 'Regent'	1955	
943	Leyland Tanker 'Esso'	1958	
944	Leyland Tanker 'Shell BP'	1963	

In 1950, Meccano introduced in the Supertoys series a number of Guy vans finished in appealing period liveries. Each model was an identical all-metal box van with opening rear doors. The Guy cab was joined by a Bedford S cab in 1955 and a Guy Warrior cab was introduced in 1960. Later, A.E.C. and other models were also added. Supertoys were commonly packaged in white boxes with thin blue horizontal lines and were marketed all on their own – no longer were these models solely focused on railroad accessories. Still, they did not quite reach the commercial marketing level of later die-cast brands like Corgi Toys or Solido.

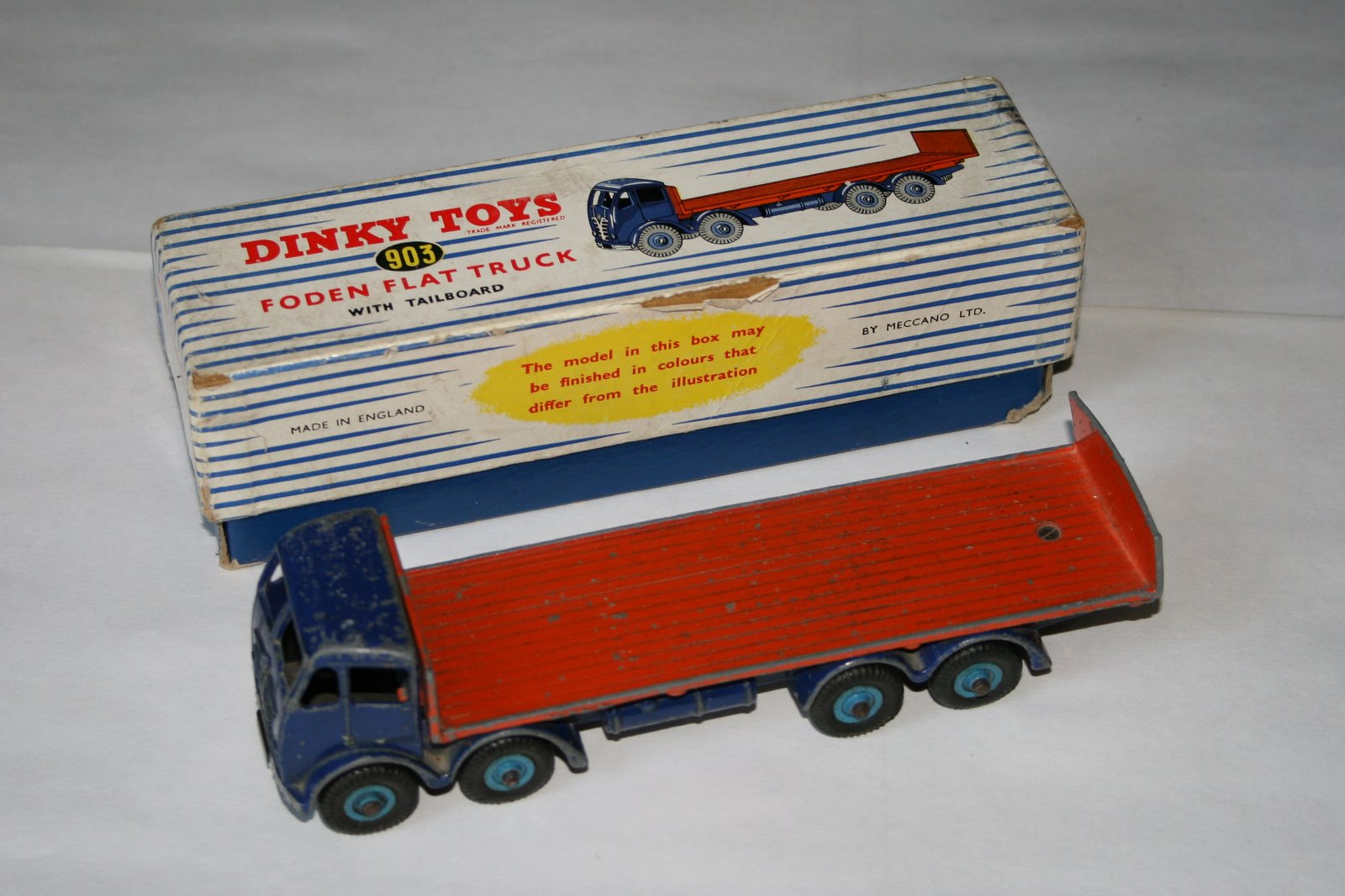
Supertoys no. 903 Foden Flat Truck with typical blue and white striped box

Number	Model	Year
514	Guy Van 'Slumberland'	1950
514	Guy Van 'Lyons'	1952
514	Guy Van 'Weetabix'	1952
514	Guy Van 'Spratts'	1952
918	Guy Van 'Ever Ready'	1955
919	Guy Van 'Golden Shred'	1955
920	Guy Warrior 'Heinz'	1960
923	Bedford S Van 'Heinz'	1955

Meccano continued producing detailed Dinky Supertoys commercial vehicles through the fifties and sixties, including such subjects as a Mobile Television Control Room and Camera Van in both BBC and ABC Television liveries, a Leyland test chassis with removable miniature 5 ton weights, a series of military vehicles including a Corporal Erecting Vehicle and missile (a subject also modelled by Corgi Toys at the same time), a range of Thornycroft Mighty Antar heavy haulage transporters complete with loads and a Horse Box in British Railways and later in Newmarket liveries.

In 1965, after the take over of Meccano Ltd. by Lines Brothers, the marque Dinky Supertoys was dropped and the large models were renamed Dinky Toys. Later a new trade mark was registered in France: "Super Dinky" but only a few models were issued with this marque before the production stopped definitely.

=== Post-war car lines ===
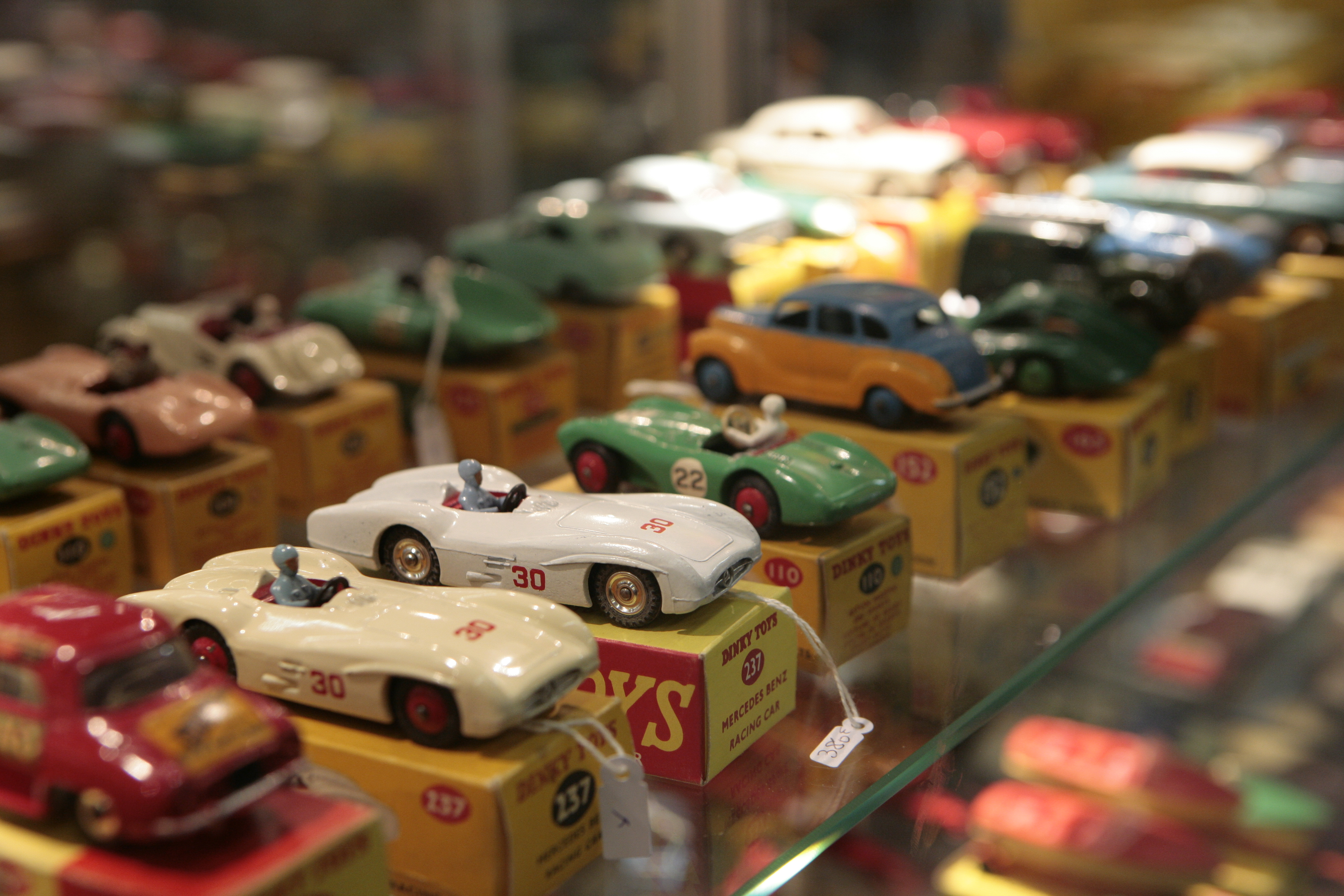
A number of Dinky models from the mid-1950s. Featured prominently are a couple of no. 237 Mercedes-Benz W 196 Grand Prix cars.

Having been well known before the war, Dinky Toys were popular in the United Kingdom in the early 1950s. The smaller cars were in a scale of 1:45, while the larger cars and many Supertoys, as stated above, were in a scale of 1:48, which blended in with O scale railway sets, but many buses and lorries were scaled down further. The scale of the Dinky Toys land vehicles range from 1/27 for the Lunar Roving Vehicle ref. 355 and 1/99 for the Duple Viceroy Luxury coach ref. 293 / 296. Because of the introduction of data processing, the British Dinky Toys range was reorganised in 1954 with a new numbering system – previously model numbers were commonly followed by letters and often sold in sets with several vehicles. Now each model had its own unique three digit catalogue number (with no letters), and cars were now sold in individual boxes. The renumbering also happened in France, but in 1959.

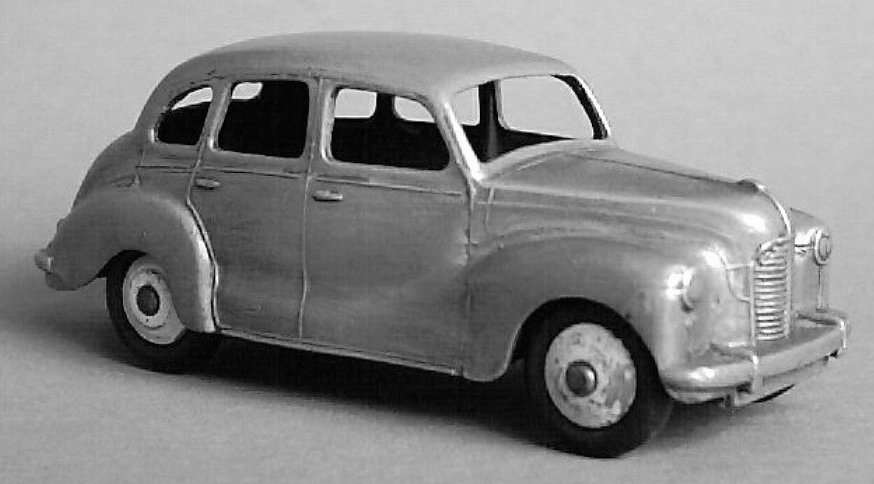
Dinky no. 152 Austin Devon Saloon. Model appears to be stripped of paint.

The Dinky Toys ranges became more sophisticated throughout the 1950s. Some cars in the sporty pre-war line were carried on after the war: for example, the Alvis sports tourer, the Sunbeam Talbot, or the Frazer-Nash BMW. These offerings then led to a magnificent line-up in the post war Dinky range, which included a Lagonda, an Armstrong-Siddeley, MG, Sunbeam Alpine, Austin Atlantic, Austin Healey 100, Aston Martin DB3S racer, Morris Oxford saloon and Triumph TR2 sports car. Additionally, several models introduced were American cars, and even now still seem unique choices, such as a 1954 Packard convertible, a 1955 Plymouth Belvedere, a Cunningham racing car, the 1953 and 1957 Studebakers (and a 1957 Packard), a Chrysler New Yorker Convertible, a 1957 Rambler, and a late model Hudson Hornet. In many cases, even domestic British / European vehicle choices for models were not everyday selections, e. g. the Connaught racing car, Maserati Sports 2000, AC Aceca, Humber Hawk, 1954 Bristol LeMans car with large fins – and a Daimler instead of the more routine Jaguar.

Several colourful gift sets of sports and racing cars were offered in the mid-1950s, usually five cars to a set. For example, Gift set no. 4 / 249 offered Cooper-Bristol in British racing green, Alfa Romeo in the Italian red, Ferrari in the blue and yellow of Argentina (Juan Manuel Fangio's country),1 H.W.M. in light green and Maserati in the red and white colours of Switzerland. No. 149, the sports car set, offered an MG, Austin-Healey, Sunbeam Alpine, Aston-Martin and Triumph TR-2.

Production of agricultural machinery and implements had occurred since the 1930s, such as the 1933 number 22e Fordson farm tractor, and such offerings were maintained post-war. One interesting model was the odd Opperman 3-wheeled Motocart, a tilting flat-bed vehicle with engine hanging off to the side of its large front wheel.

=== Dublo Dinky ===
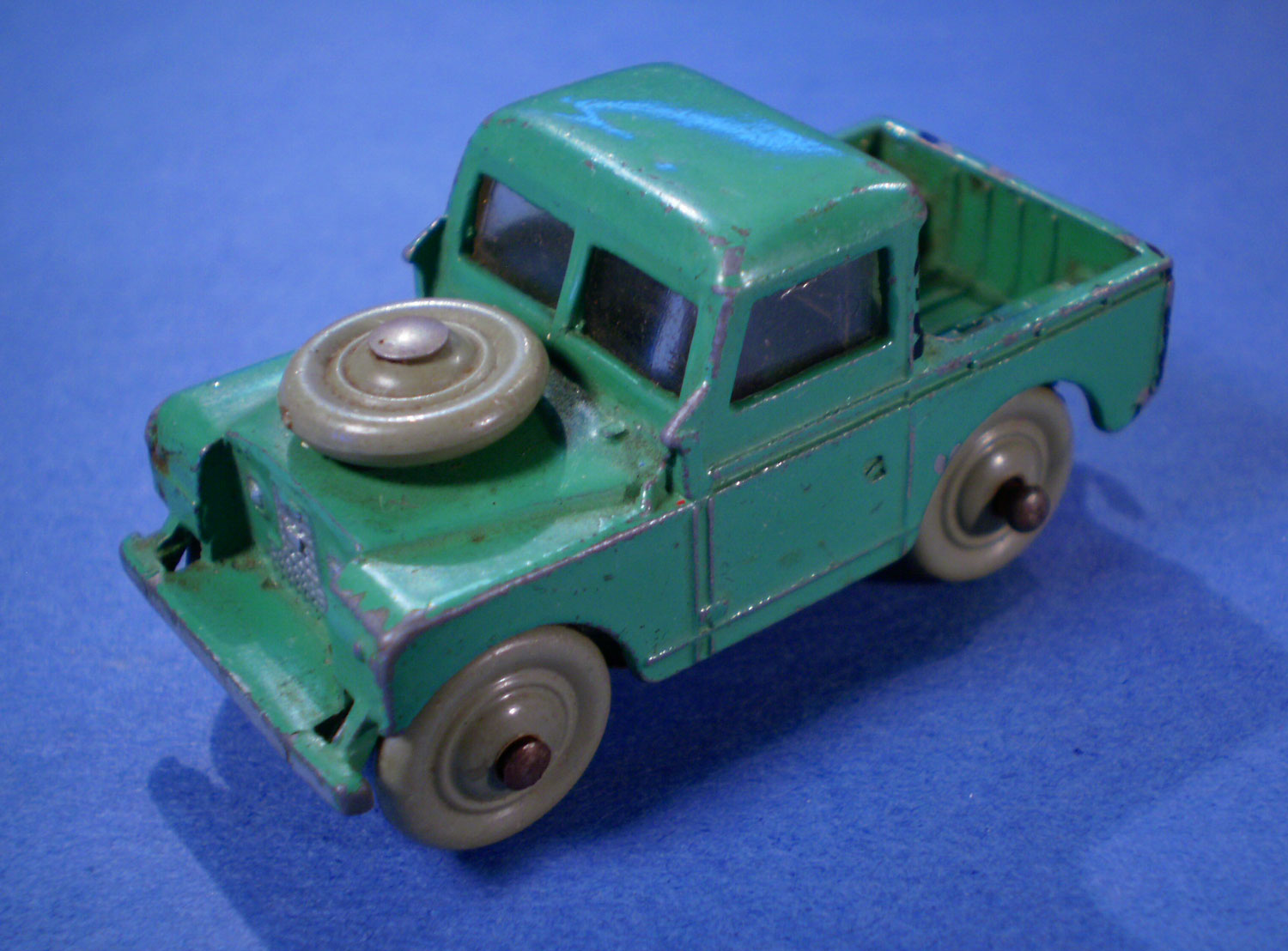
No. 073 Dinky Dublo Land Rover. The truck was just under two inches (5.1 cm) long and originally came with a horse trailer.

In November 1957, Meccano Ltd introduced the Dublo Dinky range of models in 1:76 OO scale, designed to be used with the Hornby railway system. These were relatively cheap to produce – having a one-piece die-cast metal body, a base plate and or windows on some, and plastic wheels. They were able to compete in the small-scale toy car market which, at the time, was dominated by Lesney's Matchbox.

There were a total 15 Dublo models, although with upgrades and modifications, there are possibly up to 42 variations (not including box variations) manufactured. All models came boxed. There were no colour changes throughout the short life of Dublo.

Models were well-proportioned and looked similar in style to contemporary Matchbox or Budgie Toys. For example, similar to Matchbox, the Land Rover (which came with a horse trailer) had windows, grey or black plastic wheels and a black base. Wheels, however, (the Land Rover had one on the bonnet as well as one underneath) were somewhat flatter and wider than those of Matchbox and their circumference was not ribbed at the beginning but this feature was added later. The baseplate, however, was pressed steel with etched lettering (not die-cast with moulded lettering as was the case with Matchbox, Budgie Toys or Lone Star vehicles). Finally, the Land Rover had a trailer hook behind which was a cut, curved extension of the baseplate. The front and rear axles were held to the vehicle differently. The front was covered by the tube of the baseplate and held pinched on each side by extensions of the die-cast body. The rear axle was exposed and run through holes in rounded sections folded over on each side of the plate. The ref. 072 Bedford articulated lorry was a reproduction of the Meccano factory lorry, its articulated flat trailer was dimensioned to receive the Hornby Dublo container.

The range met with limited success and the first model was withdrawn in October 1960 having only been on sale for 18 months – there was no replacement. Within 22 months of their launch there were price reductions to 3 models. Further models were withdrawn in May 1961, September 1962 and March 1963 until in November 1963 those models that remained were taken off the shelf six years after the Dinky Dublo line was introduced. Thus ended the production of Dublo Dinky Toys under Meccano who went into receivership two years later.

Five of the Dublo models enjoyed a new lease on life when Meccano was purchased by Lines Brothers.

The range:

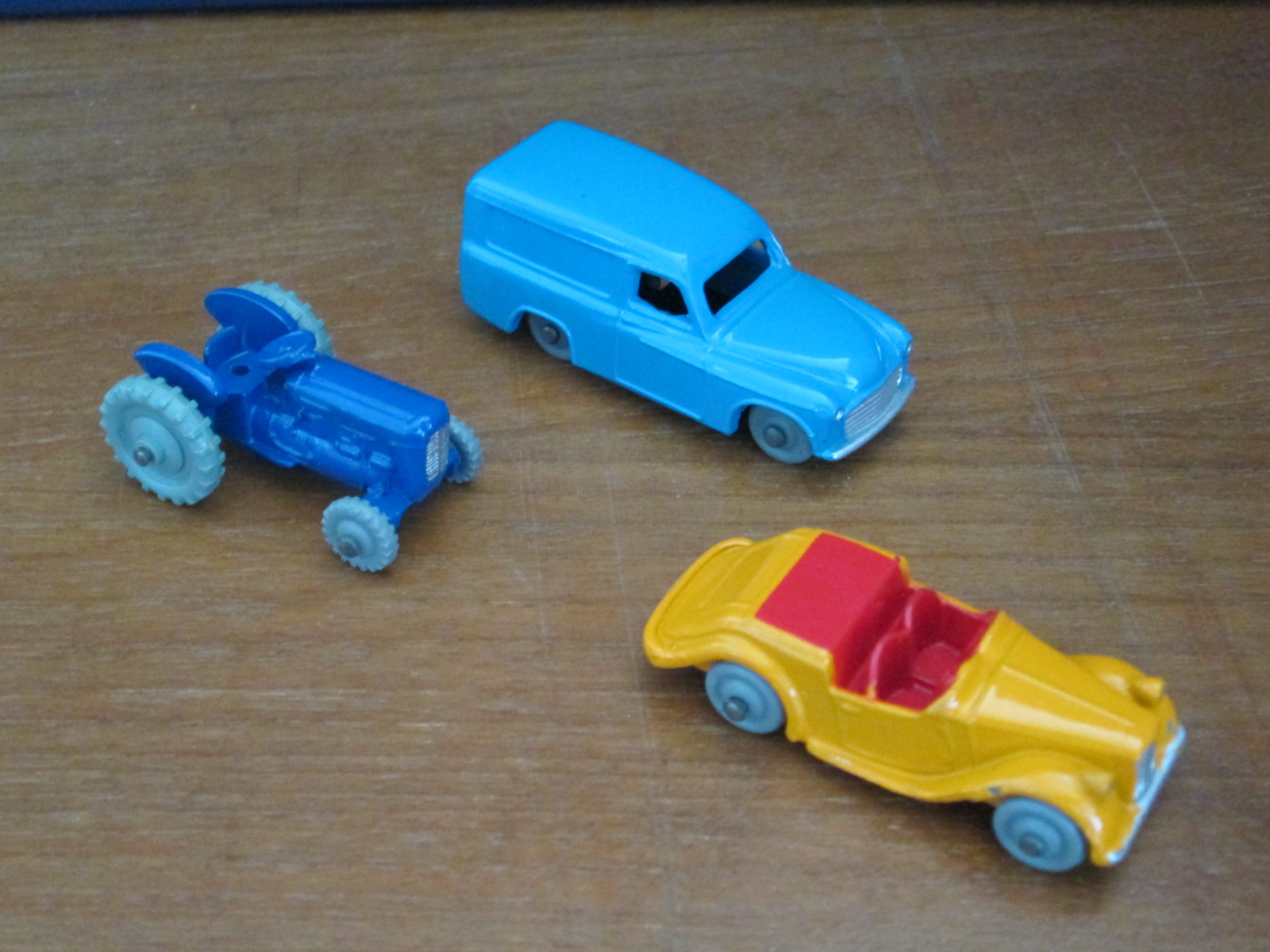
Dublo Dinky models: Commer van (no. 63), Massey-Harris-Ferguson tractor (no. 69) and Singer Roadster (no. 62).

- 061 Ford Prefect: Introduced in March 1958 and withdrawn October 1960. Three model variations and one box variation.
- 062 Singer Roadster: Introduced in March 1958 and withdrawn 1960. Two model and one box variation.
- 063 Commer Van: Introduced in March 1958 and withdrawn 1960. Three model and two box variations.
- 064 Austin Lorry: Introduced December 1957; withdrawn 1962. Four model variations and four box variations.
- 065 Morris Pick Up: Introduced December 1957; withdrawn 1960. Two model and one box variation.
- 066 Bedford Flat Truck: Introduced December 1957; withdrawn 1960. Four model variations and two box variations.
- 067 Austin Taxi: Introduced March 1959; withdrawn 1966. Two model variations and two box variations.
- 068 Royal Mail Van: Introduced April 1959; withdrawn 1964. Three model variations and two box variations.
- 069 Massey Ferguson Tractor: Introduced September 1959; withdrawn 1964. Five model variations and two box variations. Model was also issued with a low sided wagon as part of the Hornby Dublo railway system, no. 6494, boxed.
- 070 AEC Mercury Tanker: Introduced October 1959; withdrawn 1964. Two model variations and two box variations.
- 071 Volkswagen Delivery Van: Introduced March 1960; withdrawn 1964. Three model variations and two box variations.
- 072 Bedford Articulated Flat Truck: Introduced June 1959; withdrawn 1964. Two model variations and no box variations.
- 073 Land Rover & Horse Trailer: Introduced September 1960; withdrawn 1966. The most complex of all Dublos; three model variations and three box variations. The horse came in light, medium and dark tan.
- 074 This number was never used : Land Rover was to be marketed as separate but model was never produced.
- 075 This number was never used : Horse trailer was to be marketed as separate but model was never produced.
- 076 Lansing Bagnall Tractor & Trailer: Introduced June 1960; withdrawn 1964. No model variation but two box variations.
- 077 This number was never used : The planned model was to have been an AEC Transporter but model was never produced.
- 078 Lansing Bagnall Trailer (Trade box of 6): Introduced June 1960; withdrawn 1966. Three box variations.

=== Competing with the "Ones with Windows" ===
Dinky Toy No. 155: Ford Anglia (issued 1961–1966)

Dinky offerings at this time were striking, but due to the lack of much competition, development of new models was perhaps a bit slow at least until July 1956, when Mettoy introduced a rival line of models under the Corgi brand name. The most obvious difference was the addition of clear plastic window glazing. While Corgi Toys called their vehicles, "The Ones With Windows", Meccano Ltd responded by updating the Dinky Toys range and the models from both companies quickly became more and more sophisticated featuring such things as working suspension, "fingertip steering", detailed interiors, and jewelled headlights. The first model to have jewelled headlights was the no. 196 Holden Special sedan made from 1963 to 1969.

Truck models included a Simca glass truck carrying a sheet of clear plastic representing glass and a polished aluminium mirror, a Leyland Octopus flatbed with a chain around the bed, a car carrier with a trailer, a Dunlop tyre rack holding tyres, a Berliet truck hauling an electrical transformer, a Brockway bridge-laying truck, and a Mighty Antar truck hauling a large gold-coloured ship's propeller. A range of military vehicles also remained in production.

A rival third range of model cars also appeared in 1959 called "Spot-on" which were manufactured in Northern Ireland and produced by Tri-ang, a division of Lines Brothers. This range was kept to one scale, 1:42, also featured mainly British makes, and were comparatively more expensive, never managing to sell as many units as Corgi or Dinky Toys. To compete with Spot-on, the scale of British Dinky Toys was increased to 1:42 in 1963. In 1964 Tri-ang took over the parent Meccano company (which included Hornby trains as well as Meccano itself). Since Dinky Toys were more popular, Spot-On Models were phased out in 1967, although a few cars originally designed for Spot-On were made in Hong Kong and marketed as Dinky Toys. After the take-over, Meccano continued to use the 1:42 scale for many of the English made cars and trucks until 1977. The French factory stuck to 1:43 scale, which it had used since 1947.

=== Mattel rivalry ===
In 1969, two years after appearing in America, Mattel's Hot Wheels entered the UK model car market. Their low-friction axles and bright paint schemes gave new play value and appeal. Dinky and other British brands rushed to catch up, but were quite unsuccessful. Each manufacturer responded with its own version of Hot Wheels innovations–Dinky's name was "Speedwheels". The company continued to make innovative models, with all four doors opening (a first in British toy cars), retractable radio aerials (another first), new metallic paints, and jewelled headlights. Such features, however, were expensive to manufacture and toy prices could only be kept low if the quantity was high, and in the face of Mattel's Hot Wheels brand, Dinky faced a new rival.

Dinky's offerings in the 1970s covered the entire spectrum of vehicles, both real and fictitious. Besides the normal gamut of passenger, sports and racing cars, buses, farm, emergency and military vehicles – cars, aeroplanes and spacecraft were also offered from (mostly British) TV shows of the time like Captain Scarlet and the Mysterons, UFO, Thunderbirds, the Pink Panther, The Secret Service, and Joe 90 (Dinky Toys 1974), and Corgi Toys had been offering cars from shows and movies like Batman, The Saint, Daktari, James Bond, and The Man from U.N.C.L.E.

Into the 1970s, many British-made Dinky vehicles lost the precision quality of detailing and proportions seen during the two previous decades. Models like no. 186 Jensen FF or no. 213 European Ford Capri were rather chunky and unrefined with thick metal door frames, imprecise grilles, and ungainly doors and bonnets painted in separate colours from the rest of the body. Others, like the no. 1453 Citroën DS Présidentielle saloon were still impressive–flying French flags, with driver, and battery operated lights. Some of the truck and construction models remained very clever as well, with many moving features, like the Bedford refuse truck or the Taylor Excavator. At this time, Dinky also introduced "Action Kits" which were standard models that came disassembled with build instructions and consisted of about 40 pieces. On the other hand, French Dinky Toys, which had to compete with Solido since 1957, were much more accurate with better paint and sharper details than their British counterparts. The no. 825 DUKW military truck is a good example of the quality of French Dinky Toys.

=== Mini-Dinky ===
A second series of small scale models was introduced four years later in 1967, somewhat larger than the Matchbox range at 1:65. Mini-Dinky Toys, as the range was called, featured opening bonnets, doors and boots and were produced in Hong Kong and the Netherlands, with some construction models designed in Hong Kong as copies of models made in Italy by Mercury. The latter were to a smaller scale ranging from 1:87 to 1:130 depending on the model.

Each model was sold in stackable red plastic garages, with clear removable top and sides. The model would slide out of a double hinged opening door to one end. This was in place of the usual cardboard box. Some Mini-Dinkys were also blister packaged in a dark grey pack (some with garage and some not) with bright yellow lettering (Mini Dinky 2011).

== Television and movie tie-ins ==
Although Dinky Toys were not known as widely for producing television related models as Corgi Toys, they still made a number of vehicles widely known from the small screen. Many of these models were the result of beating Corgi Toys to the signing of a licensing deal with Gerry Anderson's Century 21 Productions, whose programmes are immensely popular in the United Kingdom. The French factory produced only one TV series related model: the 1406 Renault 4 Sinpar "Michel Tanguy".

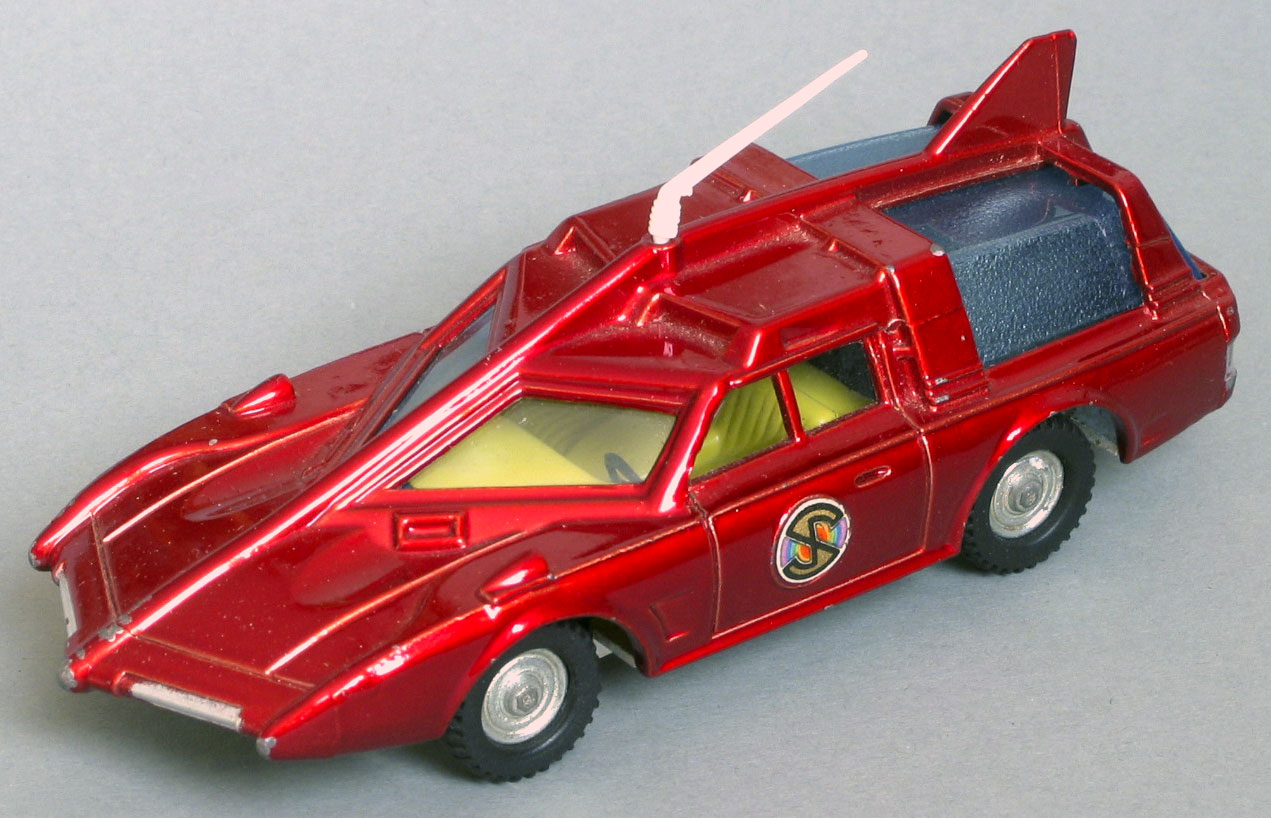
Dinky's Spectrum Patrol Car, from the Captain Scarlet series

Num.	Model	Year	Television show	Reference
100	Lady Penelope's FAB1	1967	Thunderbirds	
101	Thunderbird 2	1967	Thunderbirds	
102	Joe's Car	1969	Joe 90	
103	Spectrum Patrol Car – SPC	1968	Captain Scarlet and the Mysterons	
104	Spectrum Pursuit Vehicle – SPV	1968	Captain Scarlet and the Mysterons	
105	Maximum Security Vehicle – MSV	1968	Captain Scarlet and the Mysterons	
106	The Prisoner Mini Moke	1967	The Prisoner	
107	Stripey the Magic Mini	1967	The Magic Toyshop	
108	Sam's Car	1969	Joe 90	
109	Gabriel, Model T Ford	1969	The Secret Service	
112	Purdy's Triumph TR7	1978	The New Avengers	
113	John Steed's Jaguar XJ12C	Not issued	The New Avengers	
350	Tiny's Mini Moke	1970	The Enchanted House	
351	UFO Interceptor	1971	UFO	
352	Ed Straker's Car	1971	UFO	
353	S.H.A.D.O. 2 Mobile	1971	UFO	
354	The Pink Panther's Car	1972	The Pink Panther Show	
357	Klingon Battle Cruiser	1977	Star Trek	Coopee 2015
358	USS Enterprise	1977	Star Trek	
359	Eagle Transporter	1975	Space: 1999	
360	Eagle Freighter	1975	Space: 1999	
361	Zygon War Chariot	1978	Dr. Who	
363	Zygon Patroller	1979	Dr. Who	
368	Zygon Marauder	1979	Dr. Who	
477	Parsley's Car	1970	The Adventures of Parsley	
602	Armoured Command Car	1976	The Investigator	
1406	Renault 4 4x4 Simpar Michel Tanguy.	1968	The Aeronauts	

== Country-specific models ==
=== France ===
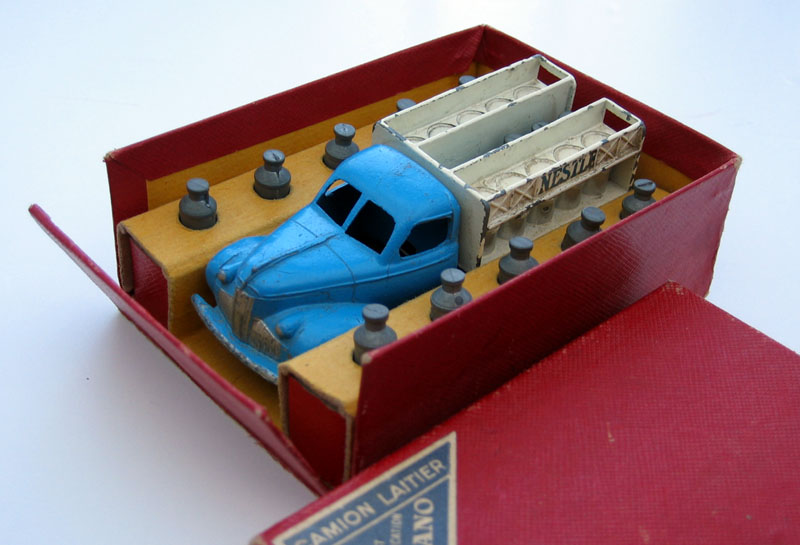
French Dinky Nestle's laitier (milk truck)

In 1912 Frank Hornby set up an office in Paris on Rue Ambroise Thomas to import Meccano toys into France. By 1921, the French market had proved so successful that production of Meccano began in Paris at the newly opened factory on Rue Rebeval, with another plant opening in 1931 in Bobigny where production of the Dinky Toys range would be based. In the early days production consisted mainly of tiny model trains cast in lead, with vehicles gradually increasing in number. By the late 1930s the French Dinky Toys range had begun to diversify from that of the British parent company, concentrating on the products of the French motor manufacturers and eventually including; Citroën, Peugeot, Simca, Renault, Panhard and Ford of France.

During the Second World War the Meccano factory was commandeered by the invading Germans and used in the Nazi war effort. The Bobigny factory was also produced an equivalent toy to the Meccano using the Märklin name. From 1945, the model vehicles were forcibly shod with solid metal wheels and the pumps did not have rubber hoses due to the shortage of rubber which was needed for the army. In the early post war period, rubber was needed badly as the French supply came from Cambodia and Laos in war against France, rubber tyres were not fitted on models until 1950. In 1951, the headquarters and offices which were still at Rue Rebeval closed and Dinky Toys production was now solely based at Bobigny.

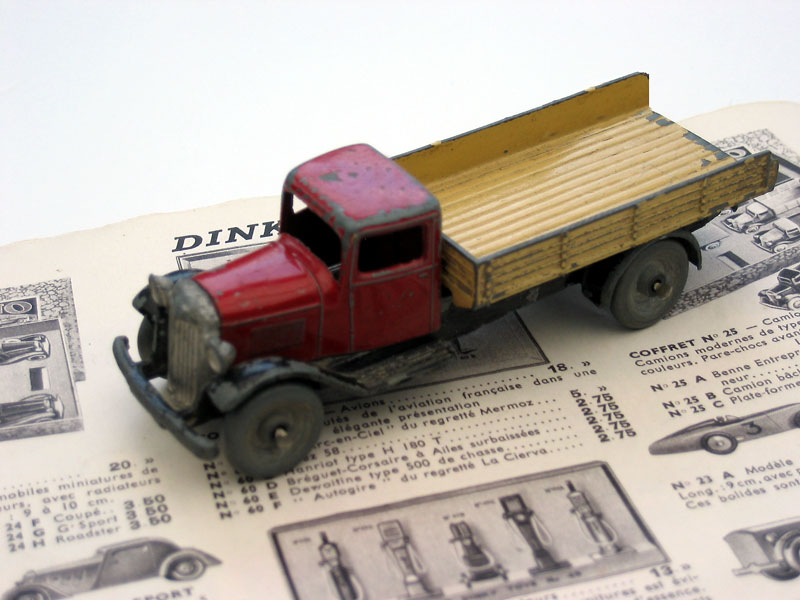
French Dinky truck and catalog from the late 1930s

In 1951, French Meccano has been the first post-war European manufacturer to introduce 1:43 scale. Initially, the scales of French Dinky Toys were similar to those of English Dinkys. The Citroën Traction Avant (24N), released in 1949, was 1:48, while the Ford Vedette 1949 (24Q), released in 1950, was 1:45, the same scales as used in the British 40 series. But then, in 1946 Meccano France released their first car in 1:43 scale: the Jeep (24M).

By the late 1950s, Italian, German and other marques, like the Dutch DAF were also offered by Dinky Toys of France. Focusing on export, American cars were also made like the late 1950s Studebaker, Chrysler's DeSoto, Buick Roadmaster, Plymouth Belvedere Coupe, Chrysler New Yorker convertible and Saratoga sedan, Ford Thunderbird "Squarebird" and Lincoln Premiere sedan. 1960s cars produced by Meccano France were the first Corvair sedan, a 1967 Ford Thunderbird coupe and a 1966 Ford Galaxie 500 sedan.

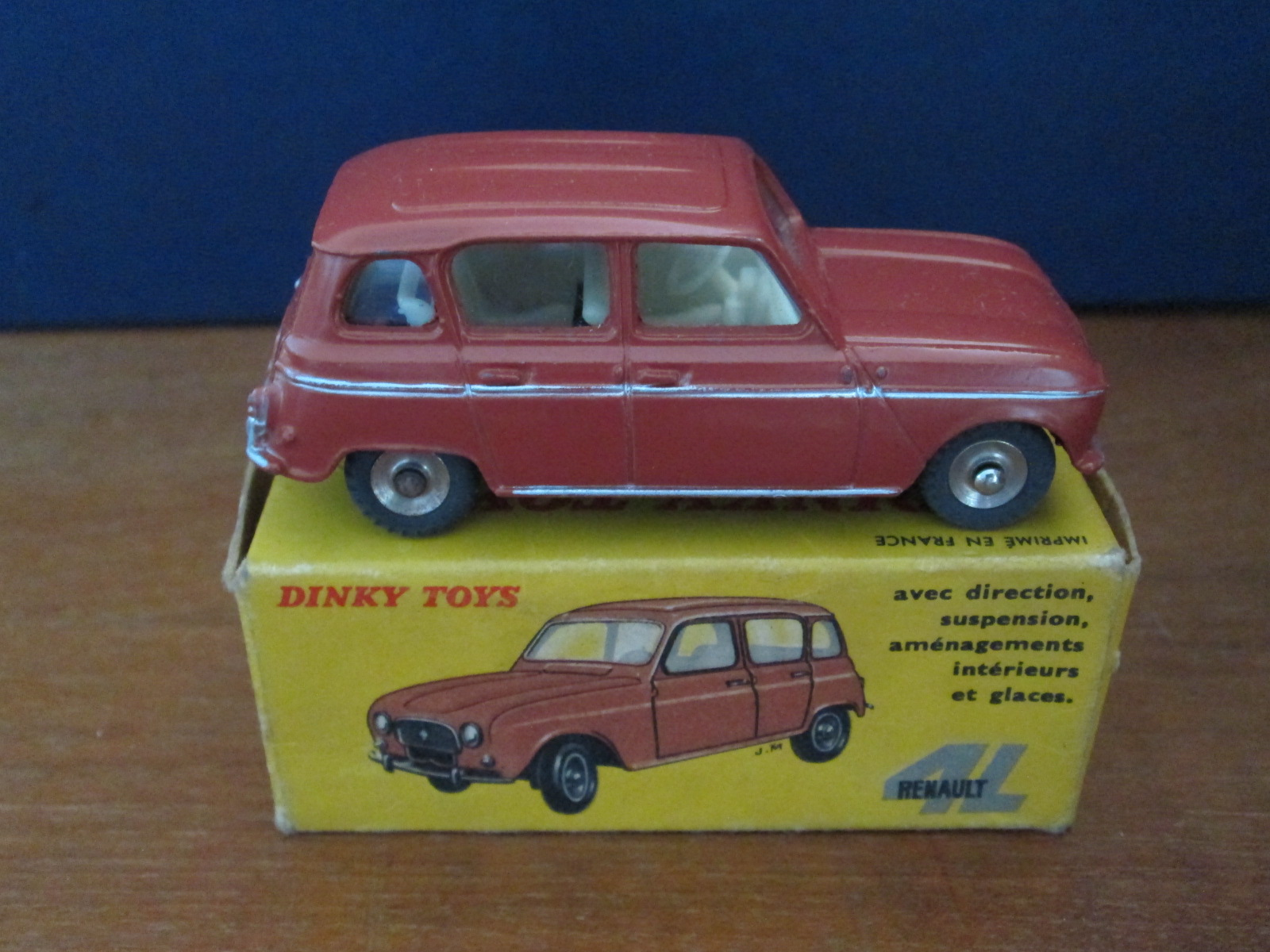
Renault 4L, French Dinky model no. 518

Some models such as the Volkswagen Karmann Ghia were produced both in France as 24M / 530 and in the UK at the Binns Road plant in Liverpool as number 187. By the 1960s there was virtually no crossover of product between the two countries resulting in a fascinating range that complemented the models. The vast majority of the French Dinky range was only available in the home market, Belgium, Switzerland, U.S.A. and other non-British Commonwealth countries although a few models did make it across the English Channel both before and after the war. Similarly, some examples of the British range of Dinky Toys were exported to France at the same time. The factory at Bobigny closed in 1970 and production moved to the present Meccano factory in Calais where the range continued to be manufactured until 1972 when the final single sheet catalogue spelt the French Meccano-built end for the best known name in die-cast toys. A contract had been signed with the Spanish firm Auto Pilen who received some tools and produced some models both as Dinkys and Auto-Pilens.

=== Spain ===
As import duties were high on finished goods and reduced on components, to get into the Spanish market, Meccano s.a. (France) exported sixteen unpainted and unassembled Dinky Toys to the Novades Poch Company in Barcelona. There the models were finished and fitted with specific Pirelli tyres.

The models are:

- 509 Fiat 850
- 510 Peugeot 204
- 513 Opel Admiral
- 514 Alfa Romeo Giulia
- 517 Renault 8
- 518 Renault 4L
- 519 Simca 1000
- 520 Fiat 600
- 523 Simca 1500
- 530 Citroën DS 19
- 534 BMW 1500
- 537 Renault 16TL
- 553 Peugeot 404
- 558 Citroën 2CV
- 559 Taunus 17M
- 560 Furgoneta 2cv Citroën

In 1974 labour was getting too expensive in France, and Meccano subcontracted the manufacture of some models to Auto Pilen s.a. in Spain. These models had already been made in France and were sold exclusively under the marque Dinky. When the Calais factory closed down some of the recent tools were sent to Liverpool where the models were produced with new baseplates. Some of these tools were later sent to Auto-Pilen where they were modified or updated before being re-issued; however, it is not known if the dies were modified by Meccano or by Pilen. These models were sold in France under the marque Dinky, they were clearly identified as Dinky and as MADE IN SPAIN on the base plate. In Spain they were sold as Pilen and marked as such. Pilen models, most of which were Dinky dies, were very popular and numerous in Spain and commonly sold in El Corte Inglés and Galerias Preciados department stores.

According to a contract between Meccano s.a. and Pilen, the last five so called French Dinkys were in fact Pilen models designed and tooled in Algeciras and fitted with a Dinky Toys base plate. Like the previous series, they were sold in France as Dinky and are very rare and as Pilen in Spain.

They were :

- 11539 VW Siroco
- 11540 Renault 14
- 11541 Ford Fiesta
- 11542 Simca 1308 GT
- 11543 Opel Ascona

=== South Africa ===
A limited-edition set of Dinky Toys from the mid-1950s shipped to the South African Defence Force

Meccano Ltd exported Dinky Toys to all of the United Kingdom's old colonies relatively cheaply because of existing Commonwealth trade agreements. South Africa was one of its big importers.

Around 1952–1954, Meccano Ltd shipped to South Africa a limited-edition set of vehicles for the South African Defence Force. This set included a Motor Truck, a Covered Wagon, an Ambulance, a Dispatch Rider, a Van, a petrol tanker, a fire engine, a road roller, a Mechanical horse and trailer, a loudspeaker van.

When South Africa withdrew from the Commonwealth in 1961, it imposed a luxury goods import tax, making Dinky Toys very expensive – a potential loss for Meccano Ltd. To resolve this problem, Meccano Ltd began shipping Dinky Toy parts to South Africa in 1962 where models were assembled and painted locally. The import of unfinished goods was not subject to the tax. These models were sold in South Africa between 1962 and 1963 and it is believed that only one batch of each model was produced, making South African Dinky Toys very rare. South Africa also imported Dinky Toys parts from the French factory in 1966 and six models were assembled and painted locally.

Some of the distinguishing features of South African Dinky Toys are:

- The boxes have Afrikaans lettering at the one end and "Printed in South Africa" on the side.
- The colours are often different from those on the same models assembled in the UK.
- The base plates have a glossy finish, whereas the same models released in the UK have matte black base plates.

South African Dinky Toys from Liverpool were:

- 112 Austin Healey Sprite Mk. II
- 113 MG B
- 139 Ford Cortina
- 140 Morris 1100*
- 141 Vauxhall Victor Estate car
- 142 Jaguar Mk. X.
- 144 Volkswagen 1500
- 148 Ford Fairlane
- 155 Ford Anglia
- 172 Fiat 2300 station wagon
- 177 Opel Kapitan
- 181 Volkswagen
- 183 Mini Minor Automatic
- 184 Volvo 122S saloon
- 186 Mercedes 220
- 193 Rambler cross country station wagon
- 194 Bentley Series S coupe
- 196 Holden special sedan
- 198 Rolls-Royce Phantom V
- 240 Cooper
- 241 Lotus
- 242 Ferrari
- 242 B.R.M.
- 300 Massey Harris tractor
- 405 Universal Jeep
- 449 Chevrolet El-Camino pick-up

South African Dinky Toys from Bobigny:

- 519 Simca 1000
- 548 Fiat 1800 familiale
- 552 Chevrolet Corvair
- 553 Peugeot 404
- 554 Opel Rekord
- 555 Ford Thunderbird

=== Chile ===
Circa 1967–1973, for reasons related to import substitution, some Dinky Toys were made in Arica, a tax free port at the very north of Chile. Only twelve models are known today, those which in England were packed in clear boxes and were provided in Chile with specific yellow packaging with a red 'globe' symbol. The boxes were printed with "Armado en Arica" ("Assembled in Arica"). Many of these models were painted in different colours from those made in England. The following are some of the models made in Chile:

- 110 Aston Martin DB5
- 116 Volvo 1800 S
- 129 Volkswagen 1300
- 232 Ford RV 40 (with left hand drive)
- 136 Vauxhall Viva (with left hand drive)
- 153 Aston Martin DB6
- 161 Ford Mustang Fast back
- 170 Lincoln Continental
- 215 Ford GT 40 racing car (with left hand drive)
- 216 Dino Ferrari
- 240 Cooper racing car
- 242 Ferrari 156 racing car
- 243 Formula 1 B.R.M.

=== India ===
Original British-made Dinky Toys had been available in select cities in India from pre-war days until about 1955, when import curbs on toys came into effect. Old stocks of original Dinky toys continued to be available for a few years in Calcutta and other metro areas until supplies were exhausted.

Later, similar to how Corgis became Milton Toys and Matchboxes became Maxwells in India, Dinkys eventually appeared there under a distinct name. In 1963, Meccano closed its Speke factory and sold the dies, the casting machines and remains of spare parts and yellow boxes to S. Kumar & Co. in Calcutta, India. Toys were marketed as Atamco Ltd. products. The toys were first assembled with parts made in Liverpool and packed in original yellow boxes with the Dinky Toys name. The quality was very poor and it is believed that Meccano Ltd. asked S. Kumar & Co. not to use the Dinky name. Kumar then applied stickers with the name NICKY on the boxes to hide the name DINKY. Later when the stock of original boxes ran out, NICKY TOYS boxes of poor quality were printed in India.

These were selected Dinky dies, and not the whole British range – with only 32 different cars and trucks produced. Several aeroplanes were also made.

=== Hong Kong ===
Between 1965 and 1967 six model cars were produced for Dinky Toys in Hong Kong for the lucrative U.S. market. Originally intended to be produced by Spot-On, but re-branded as Dinky Toys when the Spot-On parent company (Tri-ang) bought Meccano Ltd, they were built to the usual Spot-On scale of 1:42. These were all American vehicles:

- 57-001 Buick Riviera
- 57-002 Chevrolet Corvair Monza
- 57-003 Chevrolet Impala
- 57-004 Oldsmobile 88
- 57-005 Ford Thunderbird
- 57-006 Rambler Classic

During 1978 and 1979, production of Dinky Toys in Hong Kong was again resumed. These were poor quality models, however, compared to earlier Dinkys, and an attempt to cut production costs and possibly shift production should the Binns Road Factory close, which it eventually did. So, the last new Dinky Toys made by Meccano were Hong Kong products. These are now some of the most sought after of all Dinky Toys. A few, such as Steed's Jaguar from the New Avengers TV series exist as pre-production examples only.

=== Italy ===
In 1980 after the Binns Road factory had closed two models have been made in Italy:

- 122 Volvo 265 DL station wagon
- 361 Missile firing war chariot

The parts may have been made in England or the tools exported, they were made and assembled by Polistil in Milan.

== Demise and rebirth ==
=== The Matchbox connection ===
Changing fashions in the toy industry, international competition and the switch to cheap labour in lower wage countries meant that the days of British-made toy vehicles like Dinky Toys were numbered. After attempts at simplifying the products as a means of saving costs, the famous Binns Road factory in Liverpool finally closed its doors in November 1979. By comparison, Corgi Toys managed to struggle on until 1983. Matchbox was taken over by Universal International of Hong Kong in 1982. Thus ended the era when UK-made die-cast toy models were dominant.

The Dinky trade-name changed hands many times before ending up as part of Matchbox International Ltd in the late 1980s. This seemed to be a logical and perhaps synergistic development, uniting two of the most valuable and venerated names in the British and world die-cast model car market under one roof. For a time some Matchbox vehicles were sold under the Dinky name. In the 1980s, Matchbox began issuing model cars of the 1950s and 1960s through the "Dinky Collection" – these models were marketed toward adult collectors. The models, like a Wolseley Hornet or a 1953 Buick Skylark convertible, were attractive and honoured the tradition of the Dinky name in realism. In fact these were often even more detailed than original Dinkys, instead resembling something more like Lledo's Vanguard range. Still, production stopped after only a few years.

The "Dinky Collection" eventually was absorbed into a themed series offered by Matchbox Collectibles Inc, owned by the US giant Mattel – which portrayed little interest in any historical honoring of the Dinky brand. Mattel has preferred to occasionally re-badge normal Matchbox models with the Dinky name for some editions in certain markets. In some cases 1:43 scale models from the Matchbox era were sometimes given the Dinky name. No new "dedicated" Dinky castings have been created in the Mattel era since Matchbox Collectibles was shut down in 2000.

=== Atlas partworks issues ===
In 2008 French partworks publishers, Atlas Editions, began to reissue models previously available as Dinky Toys under licence from Mattel. These models were only available by subscription in some European countries, initially France. This range is a twice monthly partwork featuring a particular Dinky Toy model complete with certificate and an information leaflet on the history of the casting and the real model. These models were from brand new tooling as the original Meccano dies had been previously sold to other toy makers worldwide or were destroyed or lost. The castings were similar to original Dinky Toys but the baseplates were marked "Atlas Editions – Made in China" which replaced the "Meccano – Made in England" (or "France") imprints. The new range is available in the UK, Denmark, the Netherlands, Belgium and Sweden.

In 2016, DeAgostini, the parent company of Atlas editions, launched another range of Dinky Toys in the United Kingdom and Italy, this time relaunching some of the range from 2008 onward, but replacing Atlas Editions with DeAgostini on the baseplate. Offerings to the general public were through selected newsagents in Dorset and Milan or by subscription. After a test run of 5 issues the range was discontinued in the UK. In the United Kingdom, the first five models issued were the Triumph TR2, Bedford CA Van, Ford Thunderbird, Morris Mini Traveller and the Jaguar XK120 coupe. In Italy the first three issues were the Citroen DS, Fiat 600 and the Volkswagen beetle. Issue 6 was continued in Italy and eventually Issue 6 was issued in the UK which as of November 2019 stands at issue 44. The Italian range ended after 70 issues in July 2019.
