= Guisval =

- Industry: Entertainment
- Founded: January 1962; 64 years ago Spain
- Headquarters: Spain
- Products: Die-cast toys

Guisval is a die cast car, truck and airplane brand from Spain, which was introduced to the shopping markets during 1962.

== Google tie-in ==
The brand teamed with Google to produce a Google application named GuisvalPlay, in which players could buy a Guisval toy, download a registration for it on the application and obtain a virtual version of the model toy also. This application is, as of 2021, no longer in service.

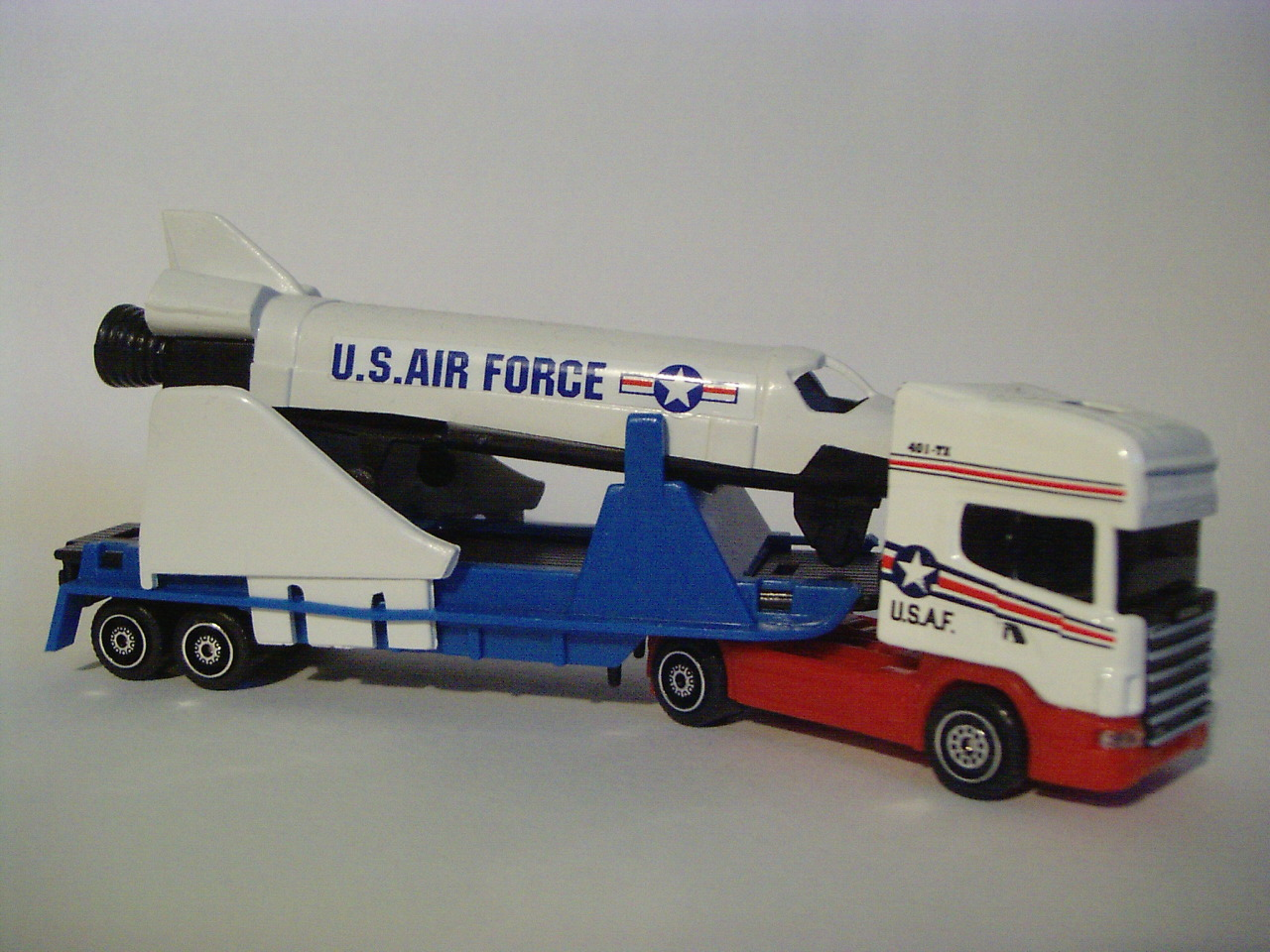
A Guisval model of a US Air Force Scania truck

== History ==
It was founded in 1962 in the town of Ibi (Alicante) by three partners, Francisco Guillem, José Luis Serralta and Ramón Valero, ancient employees of the Payà brothers. The sum of the first letters of the surnames of the founders form the Guisval acronym that gives name to the brand.

Despite initially dedicating itself to toy watches and typewriters, the firm would gain popularity for reproducing a wide variety of miniature vehicles (cars, trucks, buses...) in different series and at scales ranging from 1/23 to 1/ 87.

Currently, the manufacture of its products continues to be carried out at its facilities in Ibi, which also houses a small museum where historical pieces of the brand are exhibited.

In 2012 Guisval celebrated its 50th anniversary by holding an exhibition in Madrid that clogged the Gran Vía with miniature vehicles. The jam was solved when the assistants left taking the pieces as souvenirs.

== Products ==
The Champion Series is one of the star ranges that has survived in the catalog for decades: these are vehicles on a scale between 1/28, 1/58 and 1/87, an approximate size of 7 cm, in which These include street and rally cars, 4x4s, utility and construction machines, as well as racing and motocross bikes. Similar characteristics are shared by the Furia Series, which includes vehicles of a larger size, between 10cm and 12cm, corresponding to a scale close to 1/22 and 1/43. One of the common attractions in the vehicles of these series is the opening of doors (although only present in the Champion series) and the pad printing decoration.
