= Allen Hickling =

British architect, author and game designer (1934–2022)

David Allen Hickling (29 May 1934 – 18 December 2022) was a British architect, strategic choice process consultant, author, game designer, and authority in the field of toy forts and castles.

== Early life ==
Hickling was born in Sutton Coldfield, Warwickshire, England, on 29 May 1934. He spent his childhood years in Cheltenham, Gloucestershire, and Budleigh Salterton, South Devon.

In 1959, Hickling received a Diploma of Architecture from the Royal West of England Academy School of Architecture (RWA) in Bristol, UK. In 1970, he received a master's degree in City Planning (MCP) as well as a master's degree in Architecture (March) from the Urban Design graduate program at the University of Pennsylvania in the United States.

== Career ==
=== Architect ===
In 1959, Hickling moved from the UK to Montréal, Canada, where he lived for 9 years. He joined the architectural firm Van Ginkel Associates as Chef de Bureau, working on the development of Downtown Montreal and Meadowvale, Ontario, a new town community for the newly incorporated City of Mississauga. In 1963, Hickling joined Mayerovitch & Bernstein as project architect on one of the interconnected buildings that make up Montreal's Underground City, a development linking offices, retail space, hotels and residential complexes to the city's entirely subterranean mass transit system—the Montreal Metro. During his time in Canada, he was also part of the small team that designed the Circuit Mont-Tremblant (race track).

=== Planning and Strategic Choice ===
From 1971 to 1980, Hickling worked at the Institute of Operational Research (IOR), a unit of the Tavistock Institute of Human Relations, as a senior research scientist. During his time at IOR, he was instrumental in developing the use of Strategic Choice Theory (a dynamic socio-technical approach to planning and decision making) to help diverse groups experiencing multi-faceted challenges reach consensus. In 1979, Hickling presented a paper titled Using Strategic Choice as a Framework for Communication at a one-day event, OR, Social Science, and Strategic Choice, held at the Royal Society, London, led by the Operational Research Society.

In the 1980s, Hickling's work became closely linked to environmental policy and planning, which led him to set up his consultancy firm, Allen Hickling and Associates. The company collaborated with an international network of specialists working on the processes of planning, conflict resolution, and strategic choice, while providing services in action research, training, and facilitation. Hickling was employed by the Environment Directorates of the Dutch, German, French, Italian, Latvian, Estonian, Hungarian and British Governments, the OECD, and the European Commission, to facilitate the solving of complex problems at the highest levels by enabling politicians, professionals, managers, industry representatives, and special interest groups to work together interactively.

Hickling was also heavily involved in the private sector, working for large and small companies including British Nuclear Fuels, Direct Rail Services, IBM, Cable and Wireless, Shell, Thames Water, EBRD, and Hamersley Iron.

Hickling was a founding member of the Environmental Resolve Committee, through which he worked with the Environment Council in London. As a key part of the Council’s facilitation team, he helped design their consensus-building program and played a major role in shaping their training for facilitation and mediation.

=== Writer ===
Hickling was a well-known lecturer and authored 8 books, including the best-selling Planning Under Pressure: The Strategic Choice Approach, which provides planners, consultants, managers and students with practical ways to approach complex decision making. The SCA (Strategic Choice Approach) process is also implemented in a software tool called STRAD (Strategic Advisor). In addition, Hickling wrote numerous papers and made many contributions to books and journals on the subject of planning and strategic choice.

=== RPG Game Design ===
In the 1980s, Hickling set up Endless Games and partnered in Integrated Games. Both companies designed and produced add-on products for Fantasy Role-playing games (FRP) such as Dungeons & Dragons (D&D) and RuneQuest.

=== Toy Forts and Castles ===
Hickling was an authority on the subject of toy forts and castles and spent 30 years researching the subject. He amassed one of the largest collections of toy forts and castles in the world - half of which now resides in a museum in Cyprus. He wrote numerous articles in journals such as Toy Soldier Parade, Old Toy Soldier, and Plastic Warrior. Hickling wrote the only reference book on the subject: Toy Forts and Castles: European-Made Toys of the 19th and 20th Centuries.

=== Car racing ===
Hickling raced Production Sports Cars (TVR and Ginetta Cars) from 1962 to 1967 in Canada and the U.S., during which time he was a National Instructor with the Canadian Automobile Sport Clubs In 1965 he won his class in the Quebec Championship, and in 1966 he did it again coming third overall.

=== Cricket ===
Hickling had a lifelong passion for the sport of Cricket. He served as president of the Long Itchington Cricket Club, of which he was one of the founding fathers in 1976. He was a qualified Umpire and Senior Coach with the England and Wales Cricket Board (Association of Cricket Officials) and (Coaches Association.

== Personal life ==
Allen Hickling was married to Judith, his wife of 58 years, and had four children. He lived in the village of Long Itchington, Warwickshire, England, for 52 years.

Hickling was fluent in Dutch, which he learned with the Nuns of Vught at the Regina Coeli Language Institute in the Netherlands.

Hickling died on 18 December 2022, at the age of 88.

== Works and publications ==
=== Books ===
- Hickling, Allen (1974). Managing Decisions: The Strategic Choice Approach. Rugby: Mantec Publications. ISBN 978-0-902-54009-5. OCLC 1503647.
- Hickling, Allen (1975). Aids to Strategic Choice (2nd 1976 ed.). Vancouver: University of British Columbia, Center for Continuing Education.
- Hickling, Allen; Hartman, R.; Meester, J.C. (1976). Werken met Strategicshe Keuze (in Dutch). Samson Uitgeverij, Alphen aan den Rijn.
- Hickling, Allen; Wilkin, Luc; Debreyne, Fernand (1980). Technologie de la Decision Complexe: Des Aides pour l'Elaboration des Choix Stratégiques (in French). Tavistock Institute of Human Relations, England.
- Hickling, Allen (1981). Abordagem da Escolha Estrategica (in Portuguese). Sao Paulo, Brazil.
- De Jong, Arnold; Hickling, Allen (1990). Mens en Beleid (in Dutch). Leiden, Netherlands: Stefert Kroese Uitgevers of Leiden.
- Friend, John; Hickling, Allen (2005). Planning Under Pressure The Strategic Choice Approach (3rd ed.). Amsterdam: Elsevier/Butterworth Heinemann. ISBN 978-1-417-56916-8. OCLC 803657417.
- Hickling, Allen (2015). Toy Forts & Castles: European-Made Toys of the 19th & 20th Centuries. Atglen, Pennsylvania: Schiffer Publishing Ltd. ISBN 978-0-764-34813-6. OCLC 898088145.

=== Book contributions ===
- Hickling, Allen; Sutton, Alan (1975). "Planning as a Process of Strategic Choice". In: IFHP. Papers and Proceedings, International Congress, Amsterdam, pp. 49–69.
- Hickling, Allen; Friend, John; Luckman, John (1979). "An Analytical Framework for Inter-Organisational Coordination". In: Holm, Per. Research into Local Planning Processes, pp. 157–182. Swedish Council for Building Research, Stockholm. ISBN 91-540-3051-X.
- Hickling, Allen (1982). "Beyond a Linear Iterative Process?" In: Evans, Barrie; Powell, James; Talbot, Reg. Changing Design, pp. 275–293. John Wiley & Sons, Chichester, UK.
- Hickling, Allen (1985). "Evaluation is a Five-Finger Exercise". In: Faludi, Andreas; Voogd, Henk. Evaluation of Complex Policy Problems, pp125–134. Delftsche Uitgevers, Delft, The Netherlands. ISBN 90-6562-071-0.
- Sutton, Alan; Hickling, Allen; Friend, John (1986). "The Strategic Choice Approach to Managing Uncertainty". In Wilkin, Luc (ed.). The Management of Uncertainty: Approaches, Methods and Applications. Series D No. 32. Springer Netherlands. pp. 14–52. ISBN 978-94-010-8484-0. ISSN 0258-123X.
- Breure, Abraham; Hickling, Allen (1990). "Coping with Unconventional Projects: a 'Socio-Technical' Approach". In: Gareis, Roland. Handbook of Management Projects pp. 347–355. Manzsche Verlag, Vienna, Austria.
- Hickling, Allen (1990). "'Decision Spaces': A Scenario about Designing Appropriate Rooms for Decision Management". In: Eden, Colin; Radford, Jim. Tackling Strategic Problems, pp. 169–177. Sage Publications, London. ISBN 0-8039-8260-7.
- Hicking, Allen (2001). "Gambling with Frozen Fire?" In: Rosenhead, Jonathan; Mingers, John. Rational Analysis for a Problematic World Revisited. pp. 151–180. John Wiley & Sons, Chichester, England. ISBN 978-0-471-49523-9.

=== Journals ===
- Hickling, Allen (1978). "AIDA and the Levels of Choice in Structure Plans". Town Planning Review. 49 (4): 459–475. doi:10.3828/tpr.49.4.v4314t7172h3vu23.
- French, Simon (November 1988). "Review: Planning under Pressure: The Strategic Choice Approach by John Friend, Allen Hickling". The Journal of the Operational Research Society. 39 (11): 1067–1068. doi:10.2307/2583210. JSTOR 2583210.
- Hickling, Allen (1992). "You Build It: A Short History of UBILDA Toy Forts". Toy Soldier Parade. Vol. 2, no. 2. London: Yesteryear Publishing Ltd.
- Hickling, Allen (1998). "Burleytoys' Buster Fort No.1". Old Toy Soldier. Vol. 22, no. 2. Oak Park, Ill.
- Hickling, Allen (1998). "Chad Valley Toy Fort: Size No.1". Old Toy Soldier. Vol. 22, no. 3. Oak Park, Ill.
- Hickling, Allen (1998). "Tri-ang Fort No.1". Old Toy Soldier. Vol. 22, no. 4. Oak Park, Ill.
- Hickling, Allen (1999). "Snow Castles in the Playroom". Old Toy Soldier. Vol. 23, no. 4. Oak Park, Ill.
- Hickling, Allen (1999). "Balmoral Castle: a Moko Toy". Old Toy Soldier. Vol. 29, no. 4.
- Hickling, Allen (1999). "Tri-ang's Harlech Castle: The Story in Two Scenarios". Old Toy Soldier. Vol. 23, no. 2. Oak Park, Ill.
- Hickling, Allen (2000). "Sod's Law: A Snow Castles Round-up". Old Toy Soldier. Vol. 24, no. 4. Oak Park, Ill.
- Hickling, Allen (2000). "Tri-ang Forts". The Tri-ang Telegraph. No. R005 & R006. UK.
- Hickling, Allen (2000). "The Siege of Sebastopol: a Classic Three-in-One Toy Based on the Historical Event". Old Toy Soldier. Vol. 24, no. 2. Oak Park, Ill.
- Hickling, Allen (2001). "From Dollhouse to Fortress: The Military Aspect of Moritz Gottschalk's Toy World, Part 1". Old Toy Soldier. Vol. 25, no. 1. Oak Park, Ill.
- Hickling, Allen (2001). "From Dollhouse to Fortress: The Military Aspect of Moritz Gottschalk's Toy World, Part 2". Old Toy Soldier. Vol. 25, no. 2. Oak Park, Ill.
- Hickling, Allen (2001). "From Dollhouse to Fortress: The Military Aspect of Moritz Gottschalk's Toy World, Part 3". Old Toy Soldier. Vol. 25, no. 4. Pittsburgh.
- Hickling, Allen (2003). "From Dollhouse to Fortress: The Military Aspect of Moritz Gottschalk's Toy World, Part 4". Old Toy Soldier. Vol. 27, no. 2. Pittsburgh.
- Hickling, Allen (2003). "A Toy Fort Anomaly". The Tri-ang Telegraph. No. RO16. Oak Park, Ill.: The Tri-ang Society.
- Hickling, Allen (2003). "Lines Bros New Toy Forts 1939". The Tri-ang Telegraph. No. RO36.
- Bryson, John M.; Ackermann, Fran; Eden, Colin (November 2004). "Contributions of Planning Under Pressure". Planning Theory. 3 (3): 201–210. doi:10.1177/1473095204048814. S2CID 109027081.
- Hickling, Allen (2004). "Mr Kleemann's Legacy: The Original (History)". Plastic Warrior. No. 101. Woking, Surrey, England.
- Hickling, Allen (2004). "Mr Kleemann's Legacy: The Original (Design)". Plastic Warrior. No. 102. Woking, Surrey, England.
- Hickling, Allen (2004). "Mr Kleemann's Legacy: Copies and Derivatives". Plastic Warrior. No. 103. Woking, Surrey, England.
- Hickling, Allen (2004). "Jack Binns and Bill Barker were BINBAK". Old Toy Soldier. Vol. 28, no. 4. Pittsburgh.
- Hickling, Allen (2005). "BINBAK Follow Up". Old Toy Soldier. Vol. 29, no. 4. Pittsburgh.
- Hickling, Allen (2007). "Elf into Joy: Toy Forts Made by the Hall Family". Old Toy Soldier. Vol. 31, no. 3. Pittsburgh.
- Hickling, Allen (2009). "Great Minds Think Alike or Tri-ang - v - Elastolin". Old Toy Soldier. Vol. 33, no. 4. Pittsburgh.
- Hickling, Allen (2010). "The Lines Bros' New Toy Forts: 1939". The Tri-ang Telegraph. No. TT36.
- Hickling, Allen (2012). "Decision Analysis Society". Decision Analysis Today. 31 (2): 17–18. Archived from the original on 24 September 2012.
