= GNR Class N2 =

Class of British steam locomotives

GNR Class N2 LNER Class N2
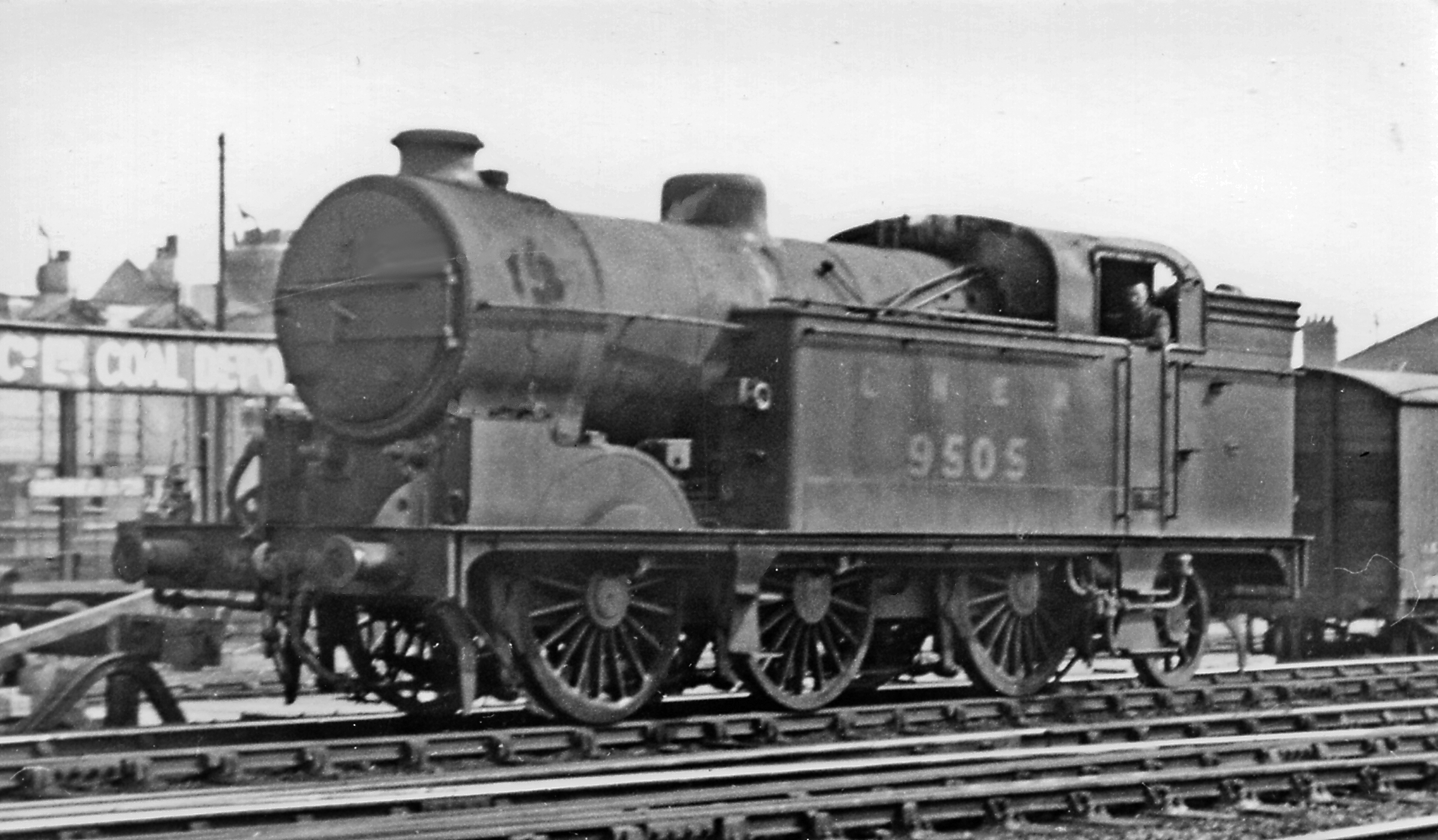
- No. 9505 at Harringay
Type and origin
- Power type: Steam
- Designer: Nigel Gresley
- Builder: N2/1: Doncaster Works (10), North British Locomotive Company (50); N2/2: Beyer, Peacock and Company (12); N2/3: Doncaster Works (6), Yorkshire Engine Company (6); N2/4: Hawthorn Leslie and Company (20), Yorkshire Engine Company (3)
- Build date: 1920–1929
- Total produced: 107 (N2/1: 60, N2/2: 12, N2/3: 12, N2/4: 23)
Specifications
- Configuration
  - Whyte: 0-6-2T
  - UIC: C1 h2t
- Gauge: 4 ft 8 1/2 in (1,435 mm) standard gauge
- Driver dia.: 5 ft 8 in (1.727 m)
- Trailing dia.: 3 ft 8 in (1.118 m)
- Wheelbase: 23 ft 9 in (7.24 m)
- Length: N2/1, /2, /3: 37 ft 10 3/4 in (11.55 m); N2/4: 37 ft 11 3/4 in (11.576 m)
- Axle load: 19.00–20.00 long tons (19.30–20.32 t; 21.28–22.40 short tons)
- Adhesive weight: 55.75–56.90 long tons (56.64–57.81 t; 62.44–63.73 short tons)
- Loco weight: 70.25–71.45 long tons (71.38–72.60 t; 78.68–80.02 short tons)
- Fuel type: Coal
- Fuel capacity: 4.00 long tons (4.06 t; 4.48 short tons)
- Water cap.: 2,000 imp gal (9,100 L; 2,400 US gal)
- Firebox
  - Grate area: 19.00 sq ft (1.765 m^{2})
- Boiler: LNER diagram 7
- Boiler pressure: 170 psi (1.2 MPa)
- Cylinders: Two, inside
- Cylinder size: 19 in × 26 in (483 mm × 660 mm)
- Valve gear: Stephenson
- Valve type: 8-inch (203 mm) piston valves
Performance figures
- Tractive effort: 19,945 lbf (88.72 kN)
Career
- Operators: Great Northern Railway; London and North Eastern Railway; British Railways
- Class: GNR/LNER: N2
- Power class: LNER: 2; BR: 3MT
- Axle load class: LNER/BR: Route availability 6
- Withdrawn: 1955–1962
- Disposition: One preserved, remainder scrapped

The Great Northern Railway (GNR) Class N2 is an 0-6-2T side tank steam locomotive designed by Nigel Gresley and introduced in 1920. Further batches were built by the London and North Eastern Railway from 1925. They had superheaters and piston valves driven by Stephenson valve gear.

Some locomotives were fitted with condensing apparatus for working on the Metropolitan Railway Widened Lines between King's Cross and Moorgate.

== In service ==
The N2s were designed for suburban passenger operations, and worked most of the duties out of King's Cross and Moorgate, often hauling one or two quad-art sets of articulated suburban coaches. These ran to places such as New Barnet and Gordon Hill on the Hertford loop. They also hauled some empty coaching stock trains between King's Cross and Ferme Park carriage sidings.

They were also a common sight in and around Glasgow and Edinburgh operating suburban services, mainly on what is today known as the North Clyde Line.

== Sub-classes ==
- Class N2/1 built 1920–21, GNR locos with condensing apparatus, for King's Cross suburban services
- Class N2/2 built 1925, LNER locos without condensing apparatus; vacuum brake, for Scotland
- Class N2/3 built 1925 & 1928–29, LNER locos without condensing apparatus; air brake, for Scotland
- Class N2/4 built 1928–29, LNER locos with condensing apparatus, for King's Cross suburban services

British Railways numbers were: 69490-69596.

== Accidents and incidents ==
- On 12 July 1932, locomotive No. 4738 was hauling a passenger train that ran back in a tunnel at London King's Cross station and was derailed by catch points. The derailed carriages fouled an adjacent line and a freight train ran into them and was also derailed. There were no injuries.
- On 10 February 1946, locomotive No. 2679 was derailed at Potters Bar, Hertfordshire due to a signalman's error. The wreckage fouled signal cables, giving a false clear signal to an express passenger train, which ran into the wreckage. A third passenger train travelling in the opposite direction then ran into the wreckage. Two people were killed.

== Withdrawal ==
The first withdrawal was in 1955, and another the following year, but official withdrawals did not start until 1957. Many of their later duties included standing-in for diesel failures and station pilots. The last thirteen N2s were withdrawn in 1962.

Year	Quantity in service at start of year	Quantity withdrawn	Locomotive numbers	Notes
1955	107	1	69514	
1956	106	1	69562	
1957	105	10	69500–01/03/19/57–59/66/90/95	
1958	95	14	69493–97/99; 69502/27/44/50–51/54/65/73	
1959	81	34	69490–92; 69508/10/15/17/22/24–26/28/30/32/34/36–37/39/41–42/45/47–48/53/55–56/67/69–70/76–78/84/91	
1960	47	15	69505/07/09/11/40/52/60/63/81–82/87–89/94/96	
1961	32	19	69498; 69506/13/16/18/21/31/33/43/49/61/64/71–72/74/80/85–86/92	
1962	13	13	69504/12/20/23/29/35/46/68/75/79/83/93	69523 preserved

== Preservation ==
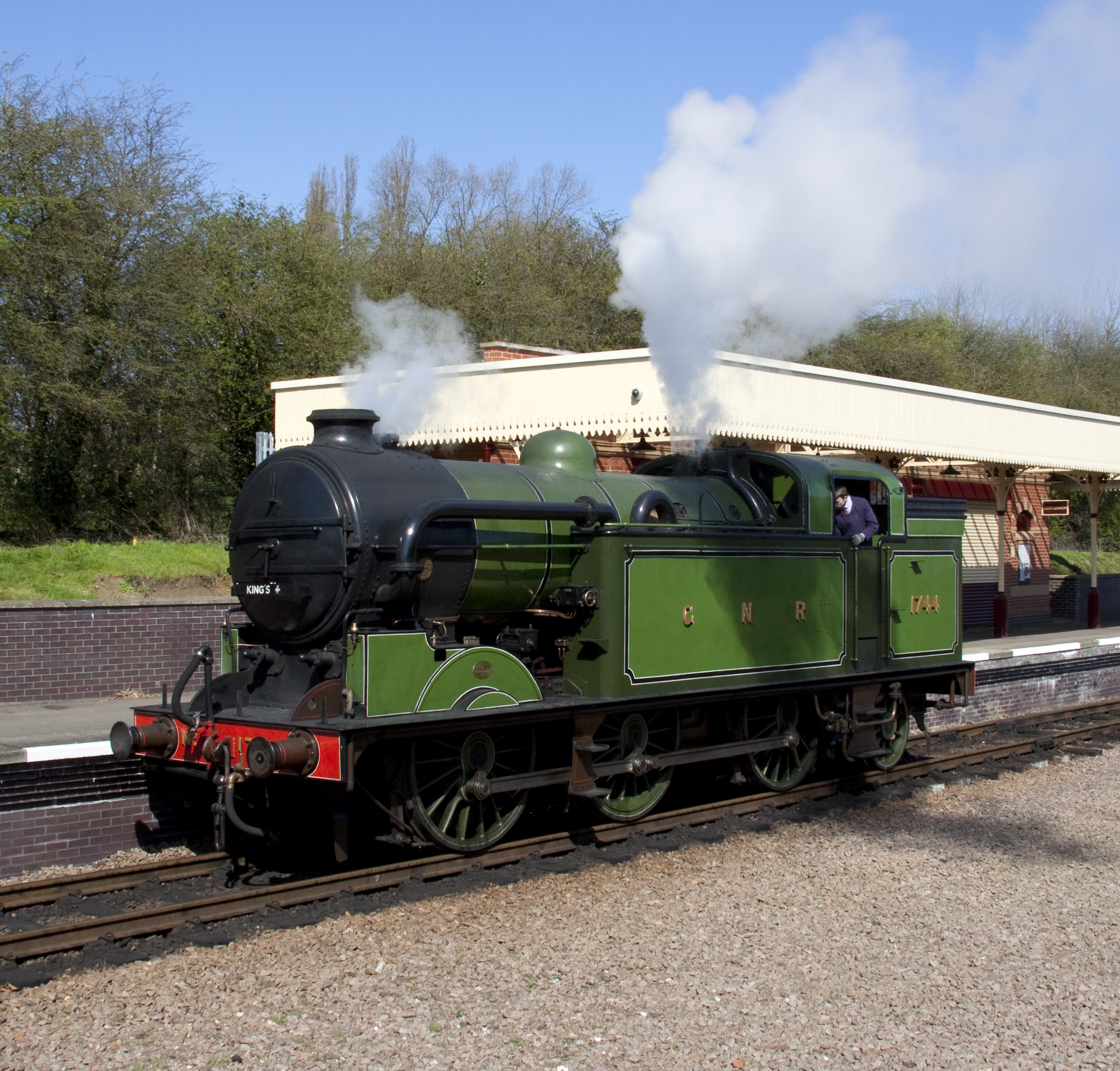
Preserved GNR 0-6-2T Class N2 No. 1744 at Leicester North on the Great Central Railway

One, No. 1744/4744 (BR No. 69523) survived into preservation, and after initially running at the Keighley and Worth Valley Railway and Great Central Railway (heritage railway), now resides at the North Norfolk Railway. It is owned by the Gresley Society, and has appeared in LNER Black, BR Black, and GNR Apple Green while in preservation. The loco's most recent overhaul was completed in 2026, with the engine being given its GNR Apple Green livery at the same time, and is usually based at the NNR when not visiting other railways. The engine re-visited King's Cross on Tuesday 5 April 2016 for the unveiling of a statue of Sir Nigel Gresley, the engine in question was moved to and from Bounds Green behind a diesel since the locomotive was unable to move under its own power at the time. It is the only Gresley-designed Tank Engine in preservation.

== Models ==
The N2 was the basis of the Hornby Dublo 0-6-2T tank engine, which was initially offered in the liveries of all the 'Big Four' companies – GWR green, LMS black, LNER black and SR olive green. Announced in the October 1938 issue of the Meccano Magazine, it retailed at 12s 6d with a clockwork mechanism, or 17s 6d for the three-rail electric version. As with other Hornby Dublo locomotives of the period, the bodyshell (or "housing" in Hornby terminology), chassis and wheels were made of diecast Zamak 5 zinc alloy. The clockwork version was last advertised in August 1940, and the electric in November 1941; after the war, the three-rail version was advertised again from June 1948, but the clockwork was not reintroduced. The 'Big Four' liveries continued, but the LNER version later changed from black to green, until April 1953 when all four were replaced by a single version in British Railways lined black. A two-rail electric version (also in BR black) was added to the range in July 1960. the three-rail version was not advertised after September 1963, with the two-rail continuing until December 1964. The final retail price for both electric versions was £2-16-9d. Meccano Ltd, the owners of the Hornby Dublo range, collapsed in 1964 and was acquired by Lines Bros, the owners of the rival Tri-ang Railways range. The remaining stock of Hornby Dublo products was then sold in packaging branded Tri-ang Hornby, but there was no new production. The former Hornby Dublo tooling was sold to G & R Wrenn, at the time another Lines Bros subsidiary; Wrenn put the 0-6-2T model back into production, in two-rail form only, during 1969. Initially in BR black, a LNER green version was added in 1970. They were packaged in boxes initially branded Tri-ang Wrenn, and later (following the sale of Wrenn by Lines Bros) Wrenn Railways.

Great Model Railways (GMR) announced two models of the N2 in their 1980 catalogue: one was to be in LNER lined apple green, numbered 9522 (9522 was the only N2 to be painted in LNER green livery, which it carried from 1946 to 1949); the other in British Railways mixed-traffic lined black, numbered 69531. Both were to retail at £17.95, but neither was put into production by GMR, which went into receivership that year. The tooling was bought by Mainline Railways, which listed them in their 1982 catalogue together with a third version, in LNER lined black and numbered 4744 (this was allocated a GMR catalogue number, although it was not advertised by GMR), and they all retailed at £25.00. All three were listed in the final Mainline catalogue of 1984, by which time the retail price had increased to £33.37 for the LNER lined black version.

Hornby currently owns the toolings for the N2, and released a model of engine 69563 as part of the R2981 London Olympics 1948 set including two British Railways (ex-LNER) 60-foot (18 m) teak coaches, 3rd class composite 1435 and 3rd Brake 24387.

Hornby also produced models of the N2 up until 2005 using the original Mainline tooling in GNR Apple Green as locomotive No. 1763, among others. These models were painted in a slightly darker shade of green than that used on the Mainline model of 9522 in 1983.

Hornby produces the LNER number 4765 in black livery using existing tooling, as R3465.

== In fiction ==
The Thomas & Friends character Ryan is based on a GNR N2/1, with the fictional number 1014.
