= Triang =

The term Triang can refer to

- Triang, Bera, a town in Pahang, Malaysia
- Tri-ang Railways, a British toy train manufacturer.
- Lines Bros, a company using the Tri-ang brand name.
