= Arkitex =

British construction toy

- Type: Construction toy
- Company: Tri-ang
- Country: United Kingdom
- Availability: c. 1959–c. 1965
- Materials: Plastic
- Slogan: Modern building equipment

Arkitex was an all-plastic construction toy produced by Tri-ang from c.1959 to c.1965. It was available in 1/42 and OO scales. The toy was designed by Geoff Bailey. One of the advantages that the toy offered was that changes can be made to a partially-built structure without dismantling major sections.

Designer Peter Allen said, "The invention of Arkitex was not in response to Lego, which was nowhere near as significant in the 1950s as it is today, but to Chad Valley's Girder and Panel Building Set, which was selling well since its launch in 1957."

The toy was produced in Tri-ang's factory that produced the Spot-On models.

== Reception ==
One contributor to the toy's failure in the marketplace is that it required more patience and care to build successfully.
