= Scalextric =

Slot car racing brand

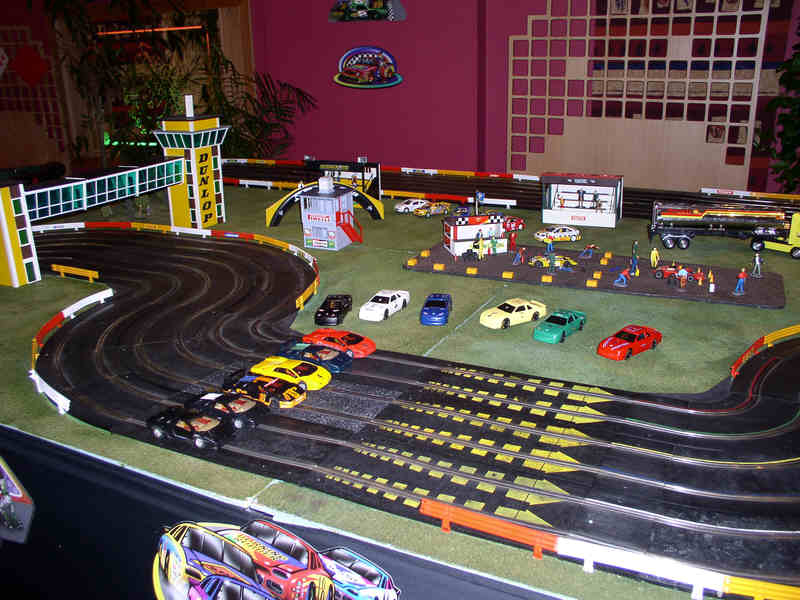
- Scalextric track and cars
- Product type: Slot car racing
- Current owner: Hornby
- Country: United Kingdom
- Introduced: 1956; 70 years ago
- Website: uk.scalextric.com

Scalextric is a British brand of slot car racing sets which first appeared in the late 1950s. Scalextric was invented by engineer B. Fred Francis, when he added an electric motor to the Scalex tin cars that were produced by Minimodels Ltd, his own company. The first "Scalextric" were made in Havant, Hampshire, in 1956. Hornby Hobbies acquired the company in 1968. In 2026, the Scalextric business was sold to Purbeck Capital Partners.

== History ==
=== Origins as Scalex ===
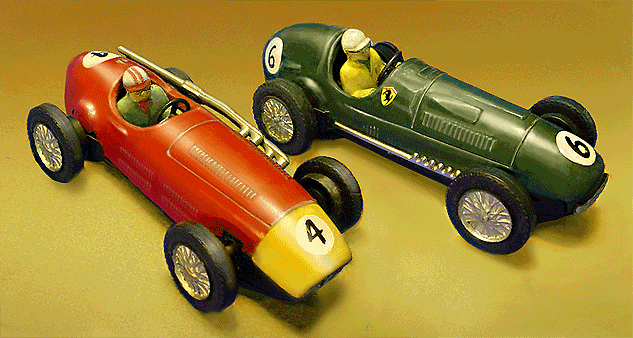
Early Scalextric cars, c. 1957, Maserati 250F (left) and Ferrari 375 Grand Prix (right)

The forerunner to Scalextric was Scalex, which Francis first produced through the company Minimodels Ltd which he had founded in 1947. The company was based in London and made tinplate toys and models. Early products included the Startex toy car range and the very popular Scalex, which was introduced in 1952. Scalex was a range of toy racing cars with clockwork motors which were activated by pulling out the steering wheel.

The first model in the Scalex line was the Jaguar XK120. These 1:32 scale models had some unique features, including a clockwork motor which was not wound by a key but by a 'fifth wheel' device. This wheel is found under the chassis behind the front axle, and works by pressing the car down on a hard surface and being pulled backwards. This wound the clockwork motor and when the car was released it shot forward at speed. The Scalex range expanded to include six cars: the MG TF, Austin-Healey 100, Aston Martin DB2, Jaguar 2.4 Saloon, Maserati 250F and Ferrari 375. The last two were in a slightly different 1:28 scale. Later cars also featured a steerable front axle which could be set at an angle and the cars would then run in an arc.

In 1952, Minimodels moved to a larger factory in New Lane, Havant to meet the growing demand for the toy cars. At the peak of its popularity, over 7,000 Scalex models were being produced weekly. By 1956, the novelty of clockwork racing cars had worn off and sales began to fall. Eventually the future of the company and its one hundred employees was threatened.

=== Creation of Scalextric ===
In an attempt to revive his company's flagging fortunes, Fred Francis began to look at alternatives. He was inspired by seeing model car racing tracks, but wanted to develop the player's control of the car so as to increase the sense of competition. He experimented by putting small electric motors into Scalex cars and running them on model railway track. Next he introduced rubber slotted track and gave the cars a 'gimbal' wheel to pick up the electric current in the groove of the track. Original tin-plate cars had one hard plastic rear wheel and one rubber-tyred wheel, which gave different handling characteristics for left and right corners. Power was supplied by batteries hidden in a little cardboard hut, with players having their own on-off button to control their cars.

"Scalex - electric", became "Scalextric", and was unveiled at the Harrogate Toy Fair in January 1957 to immediate acclaim. It appealed to both adults and children as it combined speed, competition and the glamour of Formula One motor racing. Demand for the toy was immense and the Minimodels factory struggled to keep up with the orders.

=== Sale of company and later ownership ===
In 1958, Fred Francis sold the Minimodels company to Lines Brothers, who operated as "Tri-ang". The popularity of Scalextric continued. In 1960, plastic bodies replaced the original tinplate, and in 1961, production moved to a new factory in the Leigh Park area of Havant. By 1964, Scalextric was being advertised as 'the most complete model motor racing system in the world'.

Production of Scalextric was transferred to Rovex in 1968, although the Minimodels factory remained open until the early 1970s. As of 2023, it was owned by Hornby Hobbies of England.

=== Recent years ===
In February 2026, Hornby's parent company Castelnau announced it had sold the Scalextric business to Purbeck Capital Partners, a new investment company, for £20 million.

== Later developments ==
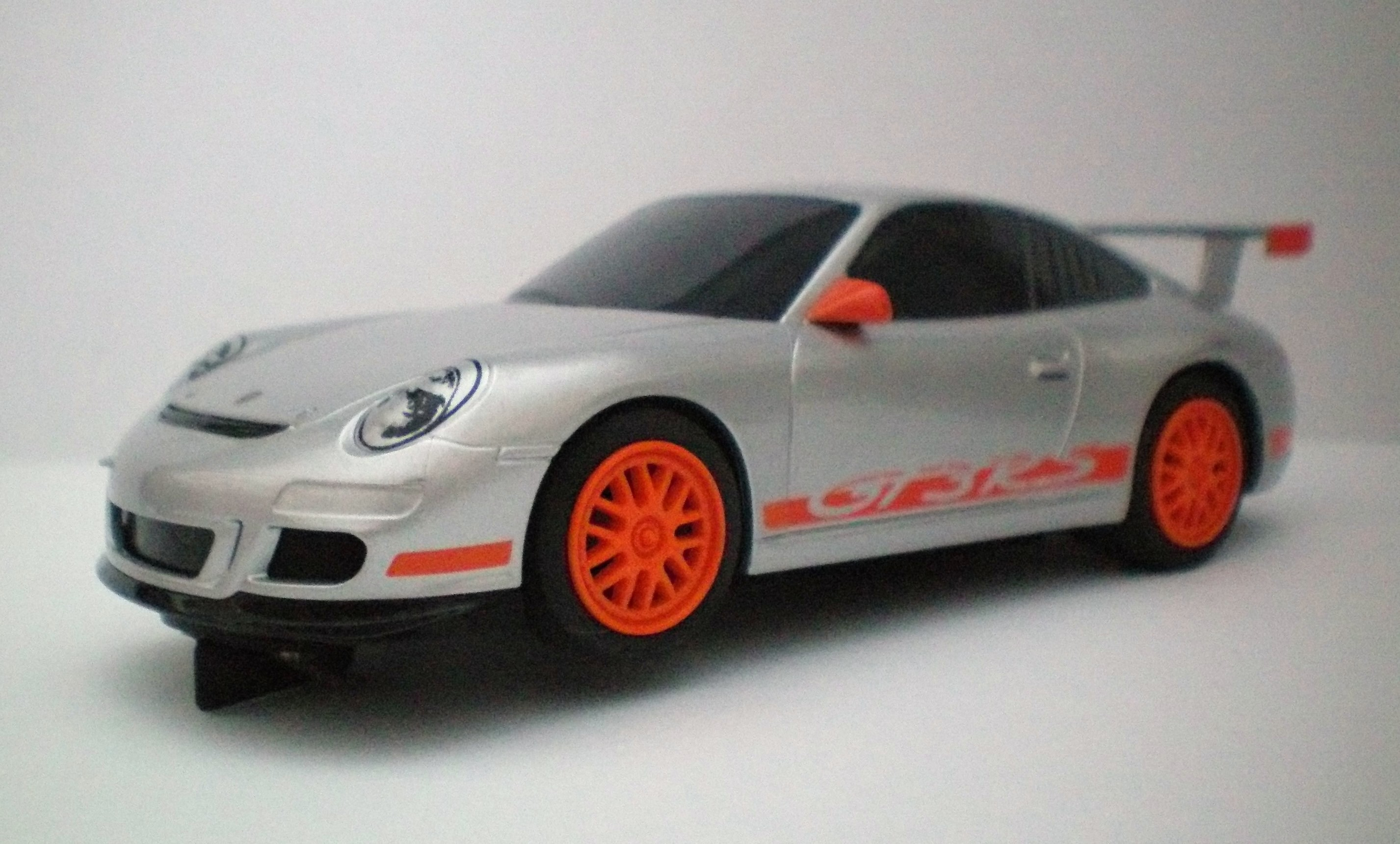
A Porsche 997 Scalextric model

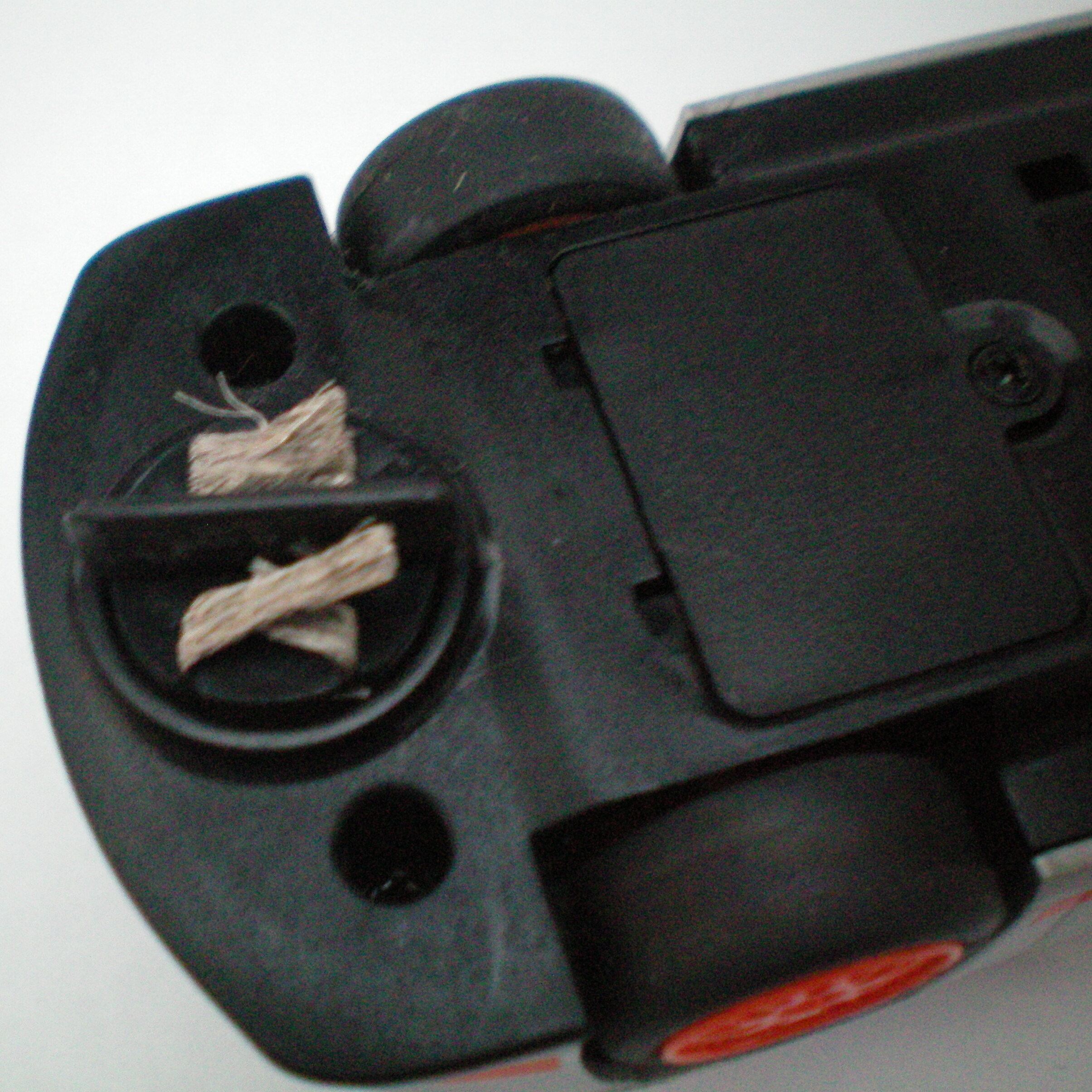
Electric pick-up brushes on the bottom of a Scalextric model

=== Micro Scalextric (1994) ===
Micro Scalextric (or MicroScalextric, as appears on product boxes) was launched on 1 February 1994 (then known as Scalextric Micro MR-1) at the Olympia toy fair. It became available to the public in October of that year and used a much smaller track geometry to the standard Scalextric product. Many of the Micro MR-1 models were re-badged products manufactured by Marchon, Inc.

In 1995, again at the Olympia toy fair, a new track system was introduced along with new vehicles. At the same time Scalextric Micro MR-1 was re-branded as Micro Scalextric. The Micro Scalextric range is aimed at children four years of age or older and has a scale of 1:64 and is often, incorrectly, described as HO scale (1:87). There is also a 'My first Scalextric' range, aimed at 3-year olds.

=== Scalextric Sport Digital (2004) ===
At the beginning of the 21st century, Scalextric track underwent a major redesign to make it easier to assemble. The new design is known as Scalextric Sport and can be connected to the original track using special adaptor pieces. The new track was designed to be compatible with all earlier 1:32 cars.

In 2004 "Scalextric Sport Digital" (SSD) was introduced, which allows up to four digital cars to be raced in a single slot. The cars can change from one slot to another using special slot-lane change tracks, the lane change or otherwise being controlled by a button on the throttle. Sport Digital cars will run on analogue layouts without modification, but analogue cars require a digital decoder to be installed before they can run on a digital layout.

=== Six-car digital powerbase (2010) ===
In late 2010, Scalextric released a revised six-car digital powerbase, C7042. This powerbase includes a separate screen which aids set-up and also displays race information such as lap times. The company worked closely with customers when developing the new system. The result includes features such as yellow flag options for dealing with crashed cars, ghost cars to race against which can run and change lanes automatically, and the ability to race in analogue mode for older models that have not been converted to digital.

=== New track system (2019) ===
In February 2019 a new track system was introduced. The latest (2019) range Micro Scalextric slot car motors run on 9v, which is different to earlier Micro Scalextric vehicles.

== Sets ==
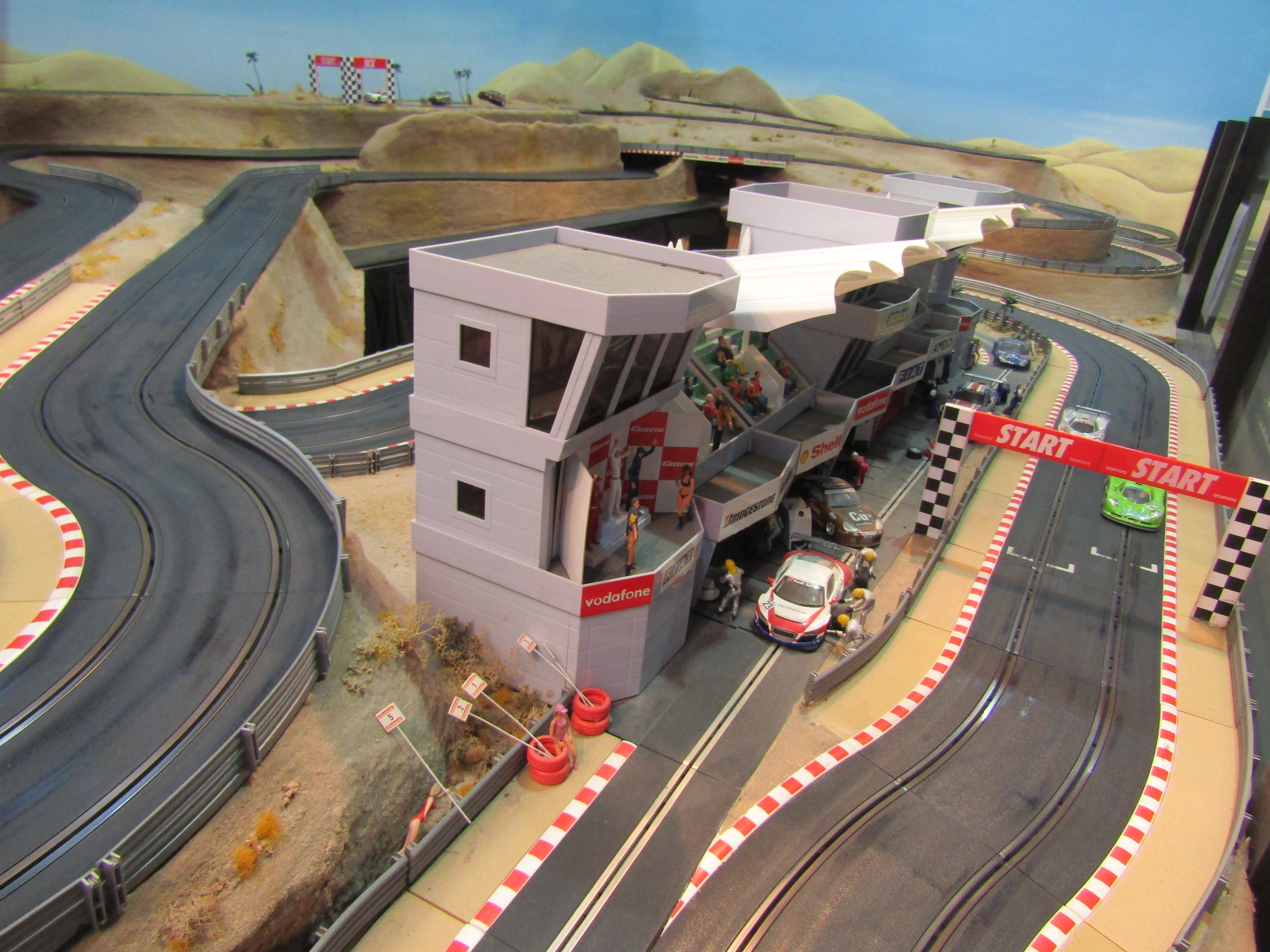
A Scalextric car racing layout on display in 'Wroxham Miniature Worlds' attraction, Hoveton, England

Scalextric is typically sold as a set containing enough track to make a circuit, the necessary power supply and throttles, and two cars. The cars are usually based on real vehicles from Formula 1, A1 Grand Prix, NASCAR, rallying, touring, or Le Mans, or based on ordinary road-going cars. A number of novelty sets have been produced, such as horse racing sets and 360-degree sets. The latter, produced sporadically since the 1960s, have a specially made guide that enables the car to run back the way it has come by spinning through 180 degrees.

== Types of track ==
Standard Scalextric track consists of straights of various lengths and corners of different radii and degree of turn. Special track includes several different styles of chicane, cross-over tracks, crossroad track and humpback bridge. Novelty pieces of track have included pit lane tracks, Le Mans start, blow-out track and loop-the-loop tracks.

There are five generations of 1:32 scale Scalextric track:

1. Original Scalextric Track (Mk. 1): This was made from rubber with thin, vertical electrical connectors, and held together with separate metal clips. This track had white lines between the lanes. Track produced during the 'Minimodels era' was slightly glossy, and curved sections had side protrusions to allow for the attachment of the supplied crash barrier. Later 'Triang era' Mk 1 track dispensed with these, possibly because they thwarted future additions like outer radius curves. The later iteration had a more realistic matt finish to its road surface. The earliest track had a dedicated 'power straight' for the connections to each lane, whereas the later one used power clips that were held in place between the contacts of any two track sections including curves. It was during this transition that the original on/off button control gave way to hand-held plungers with a greater degree of speed control.
1. Original Scalextric Track (Mk. 2): Released in 1962, the material became plastic, electrical connections were through wider, horizontal pins, and the track was held together by two integrated circular, spoon-shaped pins and sockets moulded into each end. Converter pieces were available to link the two types. It is now known as Classic track. Classic track is compatible with another leading brand, SCX's classic track.
2. Scalextric Sport: Released in 2001, another plastic track, but with a smoother surface. The track connectors are square and slot into place unlike the ring shaped Classic track ones. Converter pieces are available to link to Classic track.
3. Scalextric Digital: Released in 2004, Scalextric Digital is compatible with Sport. It allows up to 6 cars on a 2 lane track at one time, with each car fully controllable. This was a feature previously unavailable from Scalextric.
4. Scalextric Start: Released in 2010, Scalextric Start aims to be a basic track for children. It has only one type of straight and corner, and each set can be made up into various layouts; the cars included in the sets are fantasy models, which reduce manufacturers' licensing costs, and a converter track piece is available to allow cars to cross from Start track to Sport and back again.

== Design ==
Most Scalextric models are 1:32 scale. Between 1968 and 1970, Super 124 cars and track were manufactured at 1:24 scale. In 1994, Micro Scalextric at 1:64 scale was introduced. Cars and track are not compatible between scales.

In addition to types of cars, Scalextric vehicles have included motorbikes, sidecars, go-karts, pickup trucks, SUVs, racing trucks, articulated trucks, horses, skateboards and bicycles.

Scalextric is controlled with a hand-held plunger, connected by wire to a connector on the set. A set normally has two to six plungers included. Mounted in the track (for each lane) are two metal rails, which for Analogue carry the DC current from the controllers, or for Digital have constant AC current passed through them, in either case picked up by two metal braids or plates on the underside of the racing cars.

== Licensees and derivatives ==
After the appearance of Scalextric brand, slot cars became a worldwide spread hobby, driving various makers making their own plastic slot car tracks. Scalextric's most famous rivals in 1/32nd scale are/have been Carrera, Polistil and SCX. Interesting quote is PREFO from East Germany. Some brands better known for static scale models experienced the production of slot cars plastic tracks, like Revell, Airfix and Fleischmann. Other track brands were more oriented to adult hobbysts like Ninco, offering generally a better quality for a higher price.

Another offer for club tier tracks is offered by wooden tracks, which have no junctions and rails made of copper, unsensible to the magnetic field of the downforce magnet, usually forbidden in races. Some other brands specialized themselves in building cars only, without being linked to a specific track. This is possible because analog cars require only minor modifications to run on different slot cars tracks. However, they use to be provided of fitments for the chips of the most popular home digital systems, which today are Carrera and Scalextric.

In Spain, Hornby Scalextric is marketed under the brand Superslot, as the Scalextric brand is owned there by Scale Competition Xtreme, whose products are sold internationally under the SCX brand. Whilst there are some common standards, parts of the two ranges, particularly in their digital offerings, are not compatible.

== Television and film licensing ==
Since the 1960s, Scalextric have offered TV and film tie-ins, beginning with the James Bond 007 set, featuring an Aston Martin with action features as shown in the film Goldfinger. Even the 'baddie' car in this set, a Mercedes, had action features of its own, whilst the set also sported many other action points and props.

It was some time before Scalextric returned to licensing in the 1970s, first with The Amazing Spider-Man (the 1970s series), which had specially liveried TR7 cars and white track. Then, in the 1980s, came the original TV series based Teenage Mutant Ninja Turtles, Power Rangers, Knight Rider and then Tim Burton's Batman film.

Since then the franchises have grown to include Batman Begins, The Simpsons, The Transformers movie, James Bond 007 films Quantum of Solace, Skyfall, GoldenEye and Spectre, Starsky and Hutch, The Italian Job (models from both the original and re-made films), Top Gear, Star Wars and the Pixar/Disney movie Toy Story.

Scalextric produced a Dukes of Hazzard General Lee car and subsequently a twin car pack with licensing from the Fast and the Furious film franchise.

Scalextric licensed the Need for Speed brand from Electronic Arts and has produced a set based on the popular video game series.

On 22 November 2004, thieves stole 2,500 Simpsons Scalextric sets from the back of a lorry which was parked near services on the M2 motorway in England.

In 2019, products were announced using licensed characters from Looney Tunes, Wacky Races and Justice League.

== In popular culture ==
In 2009, BBC Top Gear presenter James May announced plans to recreate the full length Brooklands racing track using Scalextric track and cars. This was undertaken with a team of 350 volunteers building the track from an uncounted number of pieces of Scalextric track, navigating ponds and roads, closely following the route of the old Brooklands track. This event broke the Guinness World Record for the longest ever Scalextric track in the world, intended to measure the original 2.75 miles (4.43 km) of the original Brooklands circuit but in reality recording 2.95 miles (4.75 km) in length, because of the need to navigate modern features that block the original course. The episode was first shown on BBC2 on 17 November 2009 as part of James May's Toy Stories.
