= G & R Wrenn =

Defunct British model railway manufacturer

G&R Wrenn was a toy company specialising in the manufacture of model railways. It was founded in 1950 by George & Richard Wrenn.

== Origins ==
G&R Wrenn's first product line was trackwork for 00 gauge model railway equipment, producing a variety of points and crossings for both 2- and 3-rail formats.

Initially located at Lee Green in southeast London, the company moved in 1955 to new larger premises in Basildon in Essex, where it remained until its final dissolution in 1992. In October 1957 the family partnership was formed into a limited liability company, G&R Wrenn Ltd.

=== Slot-car racing ===
In 1960, the company branched out into electric car racing toys similar to Scalextric but whereas Scalextric adopted the popular 1/32 scale, Wrenn produced their "Formula 152 model racing system" to 1/52, and with a twin conductor rail on each side of the 'slot' the system was capable of running three cars at a time on each lane. The smaller scale meant that quite comprehensive circuits could be fitted on to an 8' x 4' baseboard, but generally, electrical conductivity was quite fragile, so many users adopted a practice of a second conductor track piece on the far side of the circuit.

Some accessories were marketed, such as track barriers, lap counters, pit buildings etc., but as the only proponents of the 1/52 scale, the system was never popular,

The original cars were a Ferrari and a Cooper and used an electromagnetic ratchet and pawl system and a contact breaker, rather than the more traditional wound electric motors. This first motor could be run on 16v AC or 12v DC current, with AC current providing slightly more power. Power was either 'on' or 'off' and cars would freewheel around corners, needing a totally different driving technique to variable speed motors. Cars could only run for a short time as they were rather prone to overheating, and performances varied wildly, according to contact and brush settings. Next Wrenn introduced a Vanwall and a Maserati into the vibrator-motored range of cars. Later developments moved on to more traditional DC motors with a variable speed control. Then all of the existing cars were available with this new motor and finally a BRM and Porsche were added to the rather limited range.

Wrenn set up a '152 Drivers club' complete with metal badge and a short lived newsletter.

Other products included battery-operated boats.

== Tri-ang Wrenn ==
The mid-1960s were a bad time for the model trade and several companies collapsed. Lines Bros Ltd (operating as Tri-ang) bought up the Hornby Dublo line in 1964 after the collapse of the Meccano Ltd empire and a year and a half later bought a controlling share in G&R Wrenn. Wrenn acquired the old Hornby Dublo moulds and from 1967 continued to produce these models under the Wrenn name as well as acting as the distributor for the remaining unsold Dublo stocks. Around the same time the Wrenn car racing system – which had competed with Lines' Scalextric – disappeared. There was speculation as to whether a deal was cut involving the Dublo moulds and the disappearance of the Wrenn racing system; but no details of any such arrangement have ever emerged in surviving records from the time. In 1968 Wrenn took on the same role with Tri-ang's TT scale range as it had with Dublo, and the 'Wrenn Table Top' name was used to sell off the remaining stocks of the abandoned Tri-ang TT 3 mm scale models. From late 1969 the company adopted the styling "Tri-ang Wrenn" for its products; but this lasted for less than three years.

== Post Tri-ang ==
In 1971, the Lines Bros group collapsed into receivership. Wrenn bought itself free from the Official Receiver and continued to trade as G&R Wrenn Ltd, primarily selling mostly die-cast products from the former 'Hornby Dublo' line. Although they obtained rights and the tooling for most of the Hornby Dublo models, they did not acquire the Hornby brandname. Lines Bros had obtained this name as a result of buying up Hornby Dublo and used it as part of the name 'Tri-ang Hornby'. The Hornby name was subsequently sold to Rovex Ltd.

Wrenn also had a sideline reselling Lima N gauge models into the United Kingdom under the name 'Wrenn Micro-models'.

In 1992, G&R Wrenn Ltd at Basildon finally closed down. In addition to the models made from the original Hornby Dublo tooling, during the 1980s the company had introduced brand new models in the form of the air smoothed (so called 'Spam Can') Bulleid Pacifics, the LMS Royal Scot and the Brighton Belle sets. 1992 was not to be the end however. Even as the closedown took place, Dapol was busy purchasing the remaining materials.

Dapol made little use of the inherited Wrenn material, selling a few wagons and reusing some of the designs in N gauge. In 2001 Dapol sold the Wrenn company to new owners - three avid Wrenn collectors, who have kept the Company alive and launched a Collectors Club and a web-site at www.gandr-wrenn.co.uk where brand new models and parts and spares could be bought. Some of the original wagon body moulds did not form part of the sale and they have now been absorbed into the Dapol production line.

In 2009 the Company ran a new 'hot metal' production run of the most popular Wrenn loco body - the Bulleid 'Spam Can' and this and the Rebuilt Bulleid loco bodies formed part of brand new Loco body models available to collectors through the Company web-site. The company ceased trading in October 2015
