= Richard Lines (toy manufacturer) =

British toy manufacturer (1929–2020)

Hugh Richard Lines (5 February 1929 – 28 January 2020) was a British toy manufacturer who headed Lines Bros.
