= Spot-On models =

British brand of die-cast toy cars

Spot-on
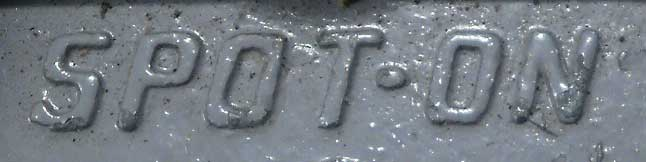
- Spot-On script from model's diecast base
- Product type: Die cast toy
- Country: Belfast, Northern Ireland
- Introduced: 1959
- Related brands: Dinky, Corgi Toys
- Markets: British

Spot-On models was a brand name for a line of diecast toy cars made by Tri-ang from 1959 through about 1967. They were manufactured in 1:42 scale in Belfast, Northern Ireland, in the United Kingdom. Spot-On's competitors in the British Isles were Corgi Toys and Dinky Toys. The line was predominantly British and rarely produced marques from other countries.

== A Tri-Ang product ==
Spot-On models was a range of diecast vehicles from Tri-ang, a division of Lines Brothers, which had been established as a toy maker in 1935. Lines Brothers made a wide range of toys, from push-along and rocking horses in the first decades of the 1900s to their main staple of trains. After World War II, Lines Brothers claimed to be the largest toy maker in the world.

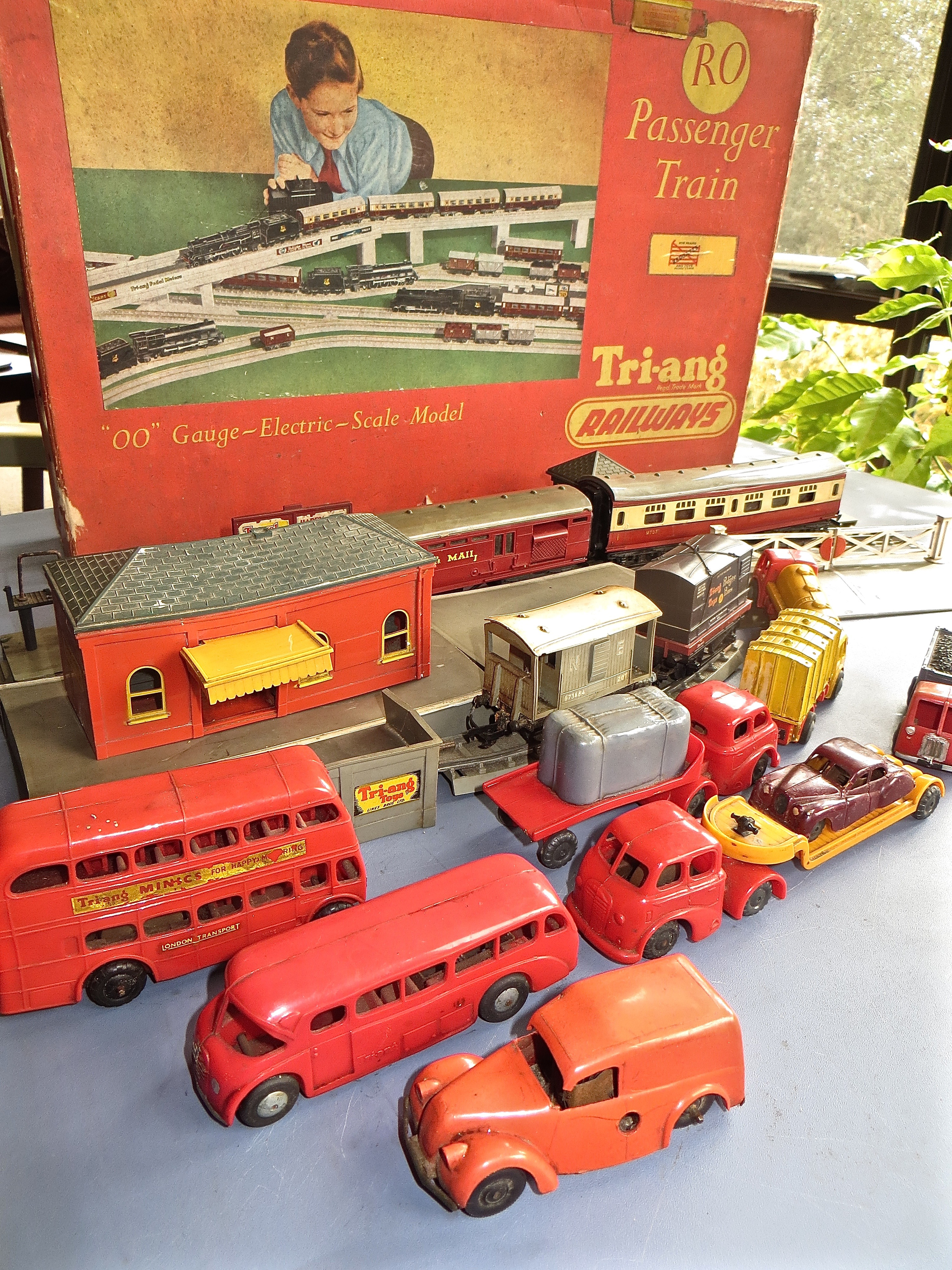
A number of pre-Spot-On Tri-Ang toy vehicles in plastic. Spot-On models, though, were diecast zamac.

In the 1950s, Dinky Toys, of Liverpool, had developed a successful range of vehicles to be purchased apart from railway sets, and in 1956 Corgi Toys, made by Mettoy, followed suit. Not wishing to miss out on a commercial opportunity, Lines Brothers started its own range in 1959, made in its factory in Northern Ireland. Murray Lines chose a distinctly British model selection.

The factory had been built in the Castlereagh area of Belfast just after World War II when the Lines Brothers expanded (another factory in southern Wales was opened at the same time). At various times, the Northern Ireland factory produced several ranges of toys for various names within the Lines Brothers' group, including Pedigree Soft Toys Ltd., Rovex Industries Ltd and Lines Brothers (Ireland) Ltd. About 1960, a smaller factory was opened on the grounds of the Belfast site specifically for the Spot-On range. There were three main product ranges: Spot-On cars, Spot-On doll house furniture, and Arkitex construction kits.

A history of all Spot-On products was published in October 2013. "The Ultimate Book of Spot-On Models Ltd" by Brian Salter (with Nigel Lee and Graham Thompson) is a 500-page large format book containing around 2000 colour images of nearly all the products made at the Belfast factory.

== Marketing gimmicks ==
The objective of Spot-On was similar to that of Dinky and Corgi: to make true-to-life models that also served as toys. The goal was for models to be detailed but robust, and Spot-On models were solidly built and heavy. As Dinky and Corgi were already established, Spot-On found it difficult to establish a marketing gimmick. Spot-On tried first to establish itself in the British market, concentrating on a choice of model cars that were familiar in the United Kingdom (the first was a UK Ford Zodiac). Even the brand name was more easily understood in the UK. In the United States, where Dinky and Corgi sold a large number of toys, Spot-On models were rarely sold; the name was not well understood, and the British line-up was unfamiliar. This, together with their larger size and smaller production numbers, made Spot-On models more expensive than the competition. Consequently, they made a relatively small impact on the toy car market. Backed by Lines Brothers, however, the product range did not need to make an immediate profit to survive.

Dinky and Corgi were both less consistent with their scale, typically around 1:48 for cars, but Spot-On decided always to be exactly "spot-on" in 1:42, because models were built to fit into "Cotswold" village style playsets. The company adopted this same scale for buses and commercial vehicles, which made these models larger than most Dinky and Corgi counterparts. For example, the 12- wheel A.E.C. Mammoth Major petrol lorry was much larger than toy lorries from other manufacturers, which were often reduced to 1:50 or 1:64 scale.

Although more conservative than Corgi Toys, Spot-On had several innovations. The Volvo 122 "Amazon" had a sliding sunroof as did the Ford Consul sedan. On some models detailed interiors were featured with appropriately dressed drivers and passengers. For example, the "Tonibell" ice cream van had a moving worker inside the serving area and some models were banks with coin slots in the roof. The Ford Zodiac was made to appear as a 'press' car. Also, enhancing the "Spot-On" name, several cars were redesigned to incorporate battery powered working headlights (these cars had no interiors). As seen below, the line-up was particularly British and often focused on British cars not always popular internationally.

== Model selections ==
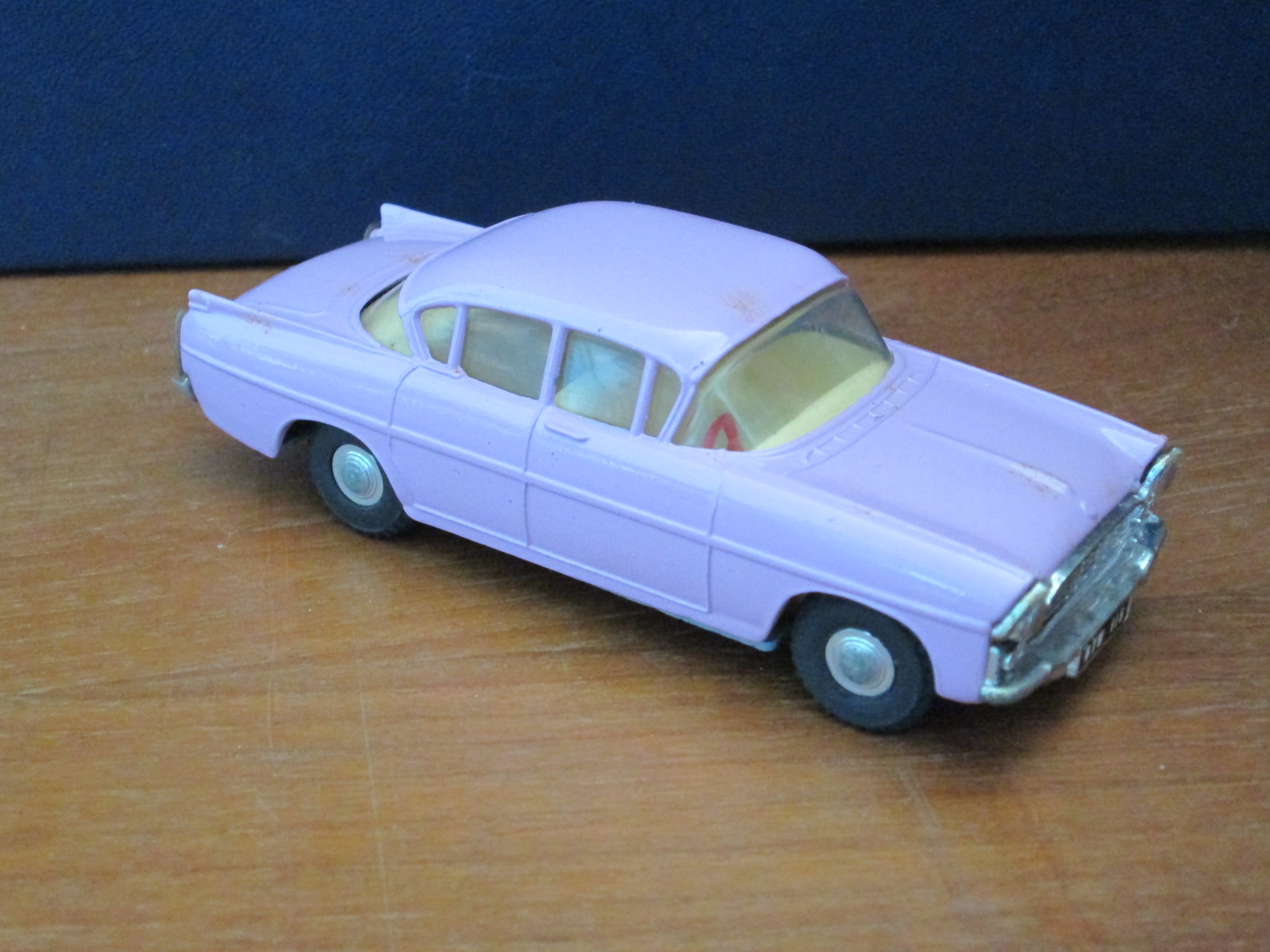
Vauxhall Cresta, Spot-On model no. 165

Both large and small cars were chosen for inclusion in the range to fully accentuate the fixed 1:42 scale. Rolls-Royces were represented initially by the Silver Wraith and, later, by the even larger Phantom V which featured working lights and members of the royal family as passengers. Smaller vehicles included the Isetta bubble car, the rare Meadows Frisky, the Fiat 500 and the Goggomobil. Also added were sports cars such as the Aston Martin DB Mark III, Jensen 541, Daimler Dart SP250, and Bristol 406, along with everyday models such as the Hillman Minx and Austin A40. The patterns for the A40 and several other Spot-On models were made by Haydn Bartlett of Space Models in the early sixties.

Cars were not the only offerings; a variety of lorries were brought out as well, including an Austin Prime-Mover flatbed, AEC Major and Mammoth, an ERF dropside lorry, a Bedford articulated tanker, a Commer delivery van and the Tonibell ice-cream truck. The UK-made Massey Ferguson type 65 tractor was also produced, though for only one year, making it worth several hundred dollars in mint condition.

== Details and packaging ==
Early Spot-On models stated "Made in the United Kingdom" on the base, but later models, such as the MG PB Midget, altered that to "Made in Northern Ireland". Most had solid colour paint finishes, simple silver metal wheel hubs and rubber tyres. Usually, lights were painted on the bodies in silver (except on the models with working lights). As with some earlier diecast makers, joints between bonnets and doors and other body panels were represented on Spot-On models as raised ridges instead of indentations. Later Spot-On models had more varied wheel styles, and tyres were sometimes a harder plastic. Whereas early models had metal bases, later ones were often black plastic.

The earliest packaging for typical Spot-On models was a light blue box with a draughting compass ( 'dividers') and a 'graph paper'-like grid, overprinted with the typical yellow and black lettering. The graphics suggested finely engineered pieces rather than simple toys. The second series of boxes was similar, but the 'dividers' were greatly reduced and an illustration of the car (absent on the first boxes) was added. The last boxes, in the late 1960s, were black and blue with a cellophane window, and may have been among the earliest window boxes offered by any brand. Gift sets, usually of two vehicles in a diorama, featured the company's own character "Tommy Spot". He appeared with a variety of friends as family man, policeman, mechanic, sailor, fireman, and even as a member of the royal family. Some of the rarest Spot-On models command high prices among collectors. Virtually all Spot-On models were supplied with number plates in transfer form, which were prone to cracking and flaking over time. The adhesion technique and brittle paint formula also contributed to paint flaking and to wear from rubbing against the box. As a result, complete, unchipped models with all accessories, paperwork and undamaged boxes are rare. Examples that command very high prices in A1 condition include the 1964 Wadham Ambulance with patient on stretcher, the 1966 Jaguar 3.4 with an undamaged roof 'police' sign, the 1962 Tourist Caravan and the 1963 Routemaster Bus. Commercial Spot-On vehicles are sought after by collectors and commonly sell for US$100 to $200.

The 1959 Ford Zodiac, Spot-On's first model, remains widely available despite being one of the oldest of the series, and many survive with their boxes intact. Rare colour combinations nevertheless exist, such as salmon pink over grey, pale lemon, and bright pink. This was one of the first models Spot-On offered with or without working lights. Despite the model's ubiquity, it is rare to find one with all of its original battery box, bulbs, and switches in full working order.

== Colours and other variations ==
Rare colour variations have become a specific area of interest among Spot-On collectors. Whereas Dinky and Corgi variations are well documented, with virtually all rarities accounted for, Spot-On models regularly appear in variations previously unknown to experts. In April 2013, a rare boxed metallic blue Renault Floride No. 166 appeared at auction and sold for £1400.

Spot-On's marketing was not always well planned, and production of some gift sets appears to have been improvised. An example is the Set702, of which at least 4 variations are known to exist; there was also a Set703. Another area of interest is models that were planned but not made. In the early catalogues and leaflets, for example, a 109/2B ERF truck with brick load is shown with a diagram, but it was never produced.

== Acquisition of Dinky ==
In 1964, Lines Bros. acquired Meccano, the parent company of Dinky Toys and, rather than support two brands simultaneously, the owners decided to discontinue Spot-On in favour of Dinky in 1967. Some production continued in New Zealand and a range of American cars was planned for production in Hong Kong for export to the United States, but these were eventually relabelled as the Dinky Toys "57" series. They did, however, retain the trademark Spot-On 1:42 scale.

From this point on, Dinkys were usually made in 1:42 scale, though unlike Spot-On they were not consistent and continued to make both larger and smaller models to fit in with different market niches. Spot-On's doll house furniture line was made at 1:16 scale.

== Destined to fail ==
Though model choices were distinctive, Spot-On models were more expensive than the competition and more conservative. Each Spot-On model was painted in at least 8, and often 16 different colours, which was attractive to the buyer (and later collectors), but an inefficient production practice. Appeal was limited for an expensive line of almost exclusively British vehicles in an increasingly global market. While American children may have been familiar with certain MGs, Jaguars and Rolls-Royces, they were less likely to know Jensens, Bristols, Armstrong Siddeleys, or Meadows. Meanwhile, Matchbox, Corgi, and Dinky always had a few American and other European cars in their line-ups. Spot-On ceased production shortly before Mattel introduced Hot Wheels, whose thin, low- friction axles put many more successful toy manufacturers out of business.

Many Spot-On models had artificial chrome attachments that have not lasted as well as Dinky Toys parts of the era. However, there is a market in replacement parts, and some commercial enterprises undertake full restoration of Spot-On models. Spot-On models are as collectible as Dinky Toys and Corgi Toys, and generally command higher prices. The Morris Minor 1000, Jensen 541, Bristol 406, and Meadows Frisky are particularly sought after by collectors because they were not produced in either the Corgi or Dinky ranges.

== Revival ==
In 2008, the French company Norev reintroduced the Spot-On brand once made by Tri-Ang, apparently using the original tooling. The Renault Floride (No 166) had been the only French marque in the original Spot-On range. The revived models were sold in packaging styled after the originals and commonly sell on eBay for about US$80 to $100 each.

Some later modellers have closely copied Spot-On models. For example, the white metal maker English Replicars appears to have copied at least one Spot-On model, the Morris Minor, in the 1990s, duplicating its details and even its 1:42 scale.
