= Van Ginkel =

Van Ginkel is a Dutch toponymic surname meaning "from/of Ginkel", a region and settlement in the province of Utrecht first mentioned in the year 777. People with this surname include:

== Surname ==
- Andrew Van Ginkel (born 1997), American football player
- Blanche Lemco van Ginkel (1923–2022), Canadian architect and educator, wife of Sandy
- Godard van Ginkel (1644–1703), Dutch field marshal and governor of Utrecht
- Joost van Ginkel (b. 1971), Dutch film director and screenwriter
- Marco van Ginkel (b. 1992), Dutch football midfielder
- Sandy van Ginkel (1920–2009), Dutch-born Canadian architect and urban planner
- Petrus Jacobus van Ginkel (born 1983), South African Industrial Engineer, and Business Strategist
- Kevin “The Big Gink” Ginkel (born 1994), American-born Arizona Diamondbacks pitcher (baseball)

== See also ==
- Kevin Ginkel (born 1994), American baseball player
