= Lines Bros =

British toy manufacturer

Lines Bros Ltd was a British toy manufacturer of the 20th century, operating under the Tri-ang Toys brand name.

Lines Bros Ltd, at its peak in 1947, was claimed by the company to be the largest toy maker in the world. The company collapsed in the 1971 and was broken up. Under the Tri-ang Toys brand name, Lines Bros Ltd also made children's bicycles, such as the Unity Dragster TT.

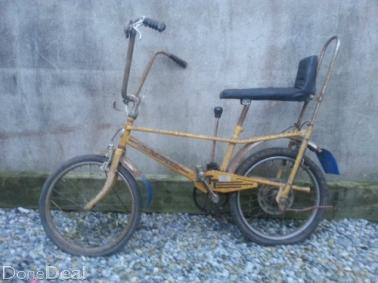
The "Tri-ang Unity Dragster TT" Bicycle.

== History ==
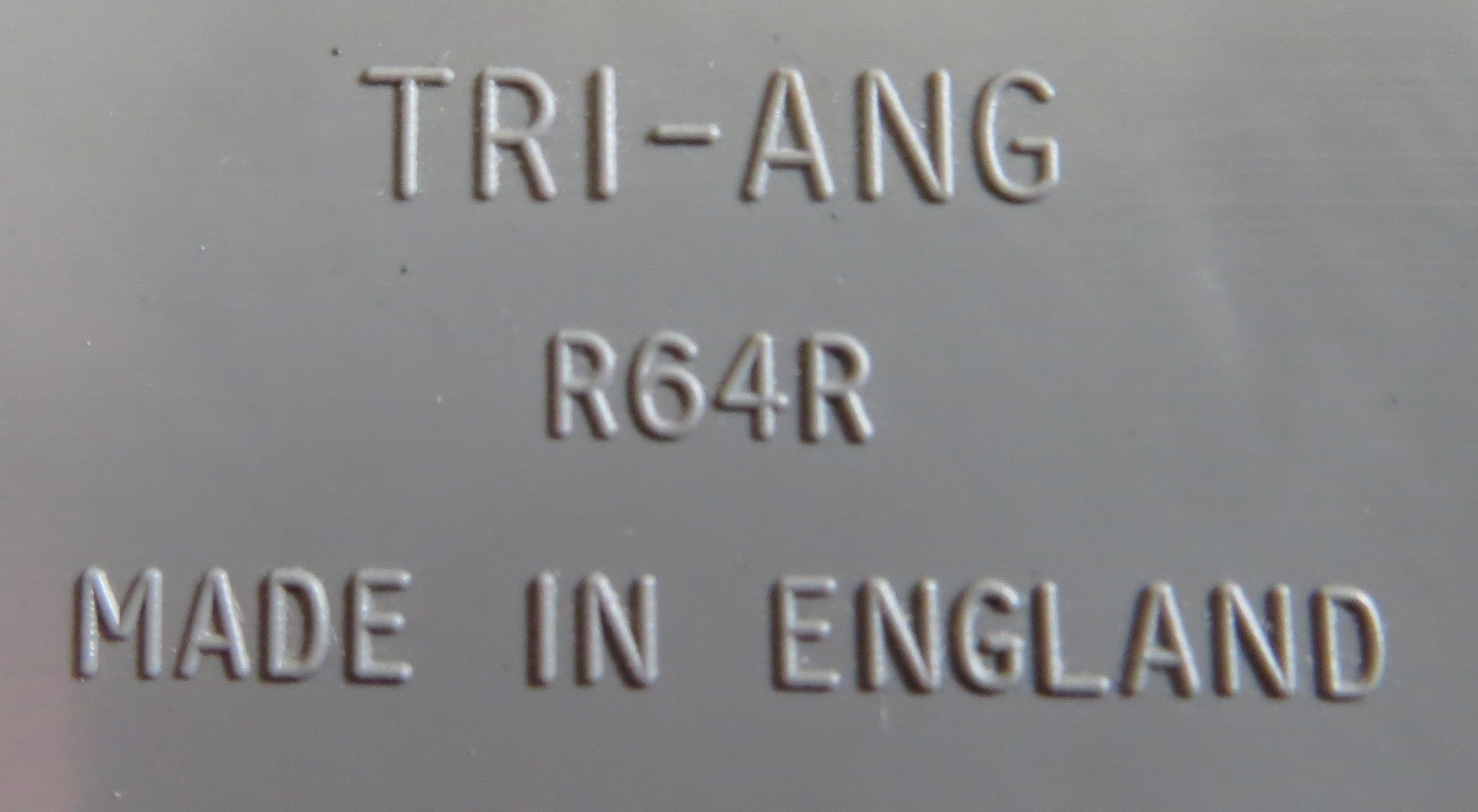
A Tri-ang R64R Platform Curved End Right last shown in the 1961 catalogue. Larger items had a catalogue number embossed on them.

The brothers George and Joseph Lines made wooden toys in the Victorian era, their company being G & J Lines Ltd. George was a trained carpenter, while Joseph was more business focused. Joseph had four sons, three of whom formed Lines Bros Ltd soon after the First World War. They were William, Walter and Arthur Lines. Three Lines making a triangle - hence the name Tri-ang.

Arthur's son, Richard Lines, was largely responsible for the Tri-ang Railways system. At the start of the Second World War, production of children's toys was deemed non-essential by the British Government. As a result, production facilities were converted to weapons manufacture, specifically the Sten Mk III submachine gun. Manufacture of toys resumed shortly after the war ended.

At their peak they had 40 companies world-wide, including the famous Hornby, Meccano and Dinky brands, but as a result of losses overseas they were in financial trouble. In 1971, Lines Bros. Ltd called in the Official Receiver. The Group was broken up and sold off. Rovex Tri-ang Ltd, which had the Hornby Railways among its portfolio, was Pocket Money Toys Ltd and then sold as Rovex Ltd, complete with its factories at Westwood and Canterbury, to Dunbee-Combex-Marx Ltd. (DCM).

G & R Wrenn, a linked toy railway company, bought itself free as Wrenn Railways. The remains of the Tri-ang brand was sold off. As a result, the Tri-ang Hornby system took the name Hornby Railways from January 1972, with the Dinky and Meccano businesses being acquired by Airfix.

== Product lines ==
=== Wooden toys ===
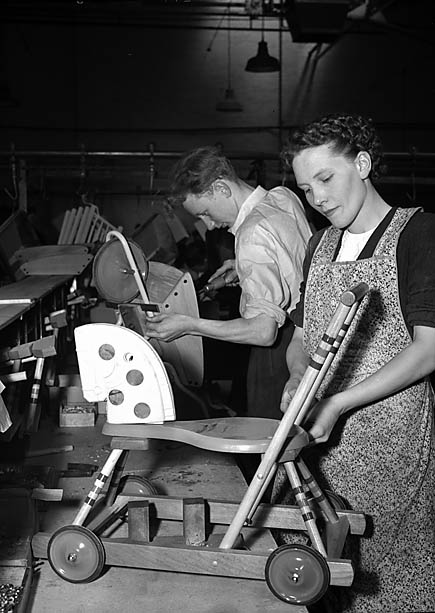
Hobby horse walkers being made in Merthyr Tydfil in 1951

The company kept producing toys made of wood such as dolls' houses, toy forts, a Noah's Ark with wooden animals, and a small range of wooden soldiers.

=== Railways ===
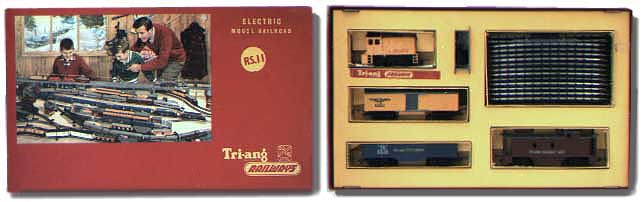
A boxed Tri-ang railway set from 1961.

Lines Bros had its own railway system, the Rovex system, marketed as Tri-ang Railways. In 1964, Meccano Ltd, which manufactured the Hornby Dublo range, collapsed. Lines Bros. purchased the company, and in 1965 the combined model railway was marketed as Tri-ang-Hornby although the vast majority of the system was all Tri-ang 2 rail.

In 1966 a controlling interest was acquired in a smaller rival, G & R Wrenn. Wrenn were sold all the redundant, 3 rail, Hornby Dublo tooling. In 1971, when the Lines Bros. empire was broken up, Rovex - Tri-ang was purchased by Dunbee, Combex, Marx (DCM) but without the Tri-ang brand. Because of this, DCM were forced to re-brand the model railway as Hornby Railways.

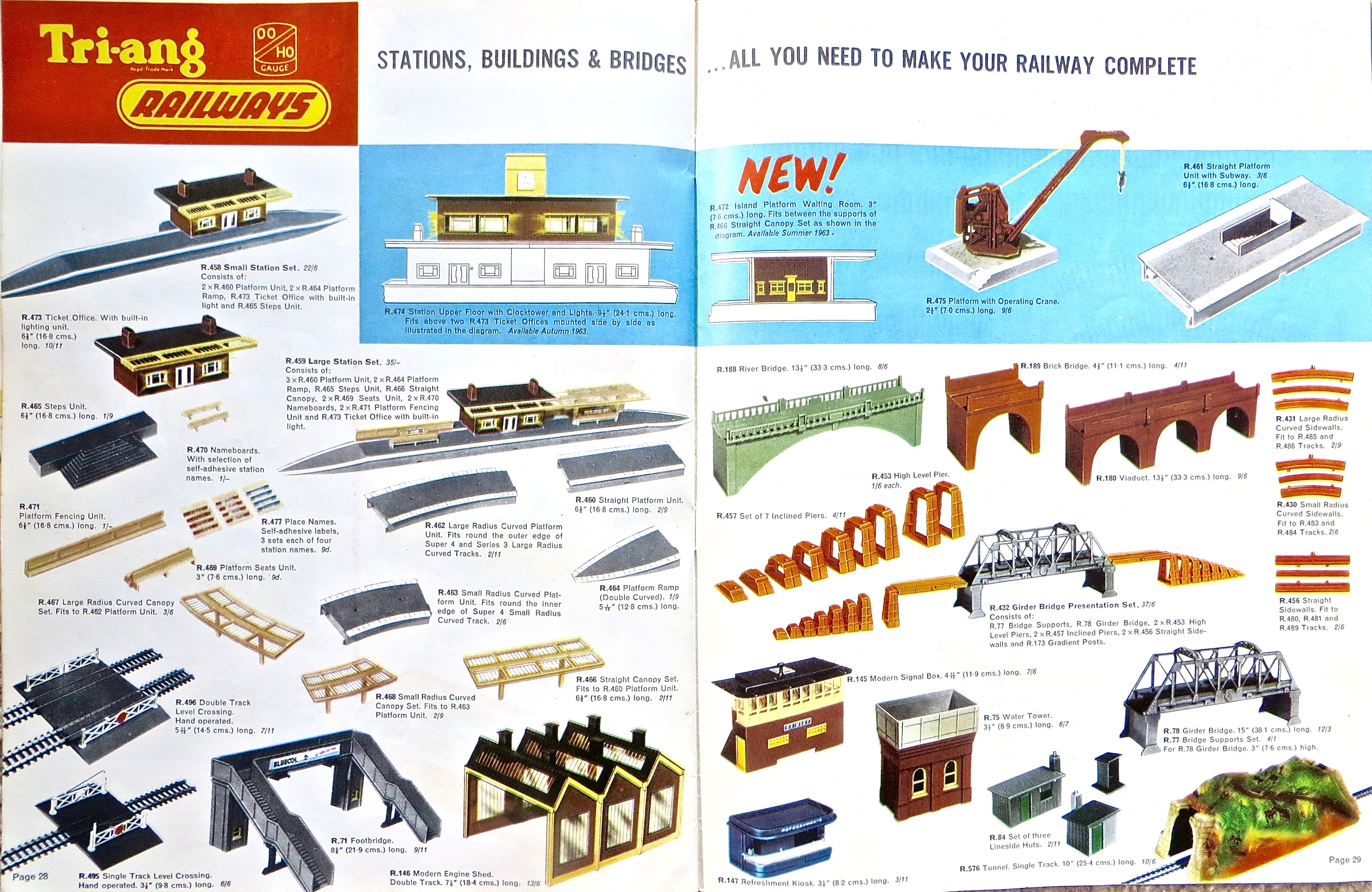
A 1963 Tri-ang Railways catalogue, the year the red and yellow station buildings were replaced. In 1962 the R.60 Ticket Office cost 8/3, £7.81 at 2014 values.

Railway systems:

- Tri-ang Minic Narrow Gauge (garden) railways in 10 1/4" gauge.
- Railways systems (see above) in '00' and 'TT' gauges.

=== Large road vehicles ===
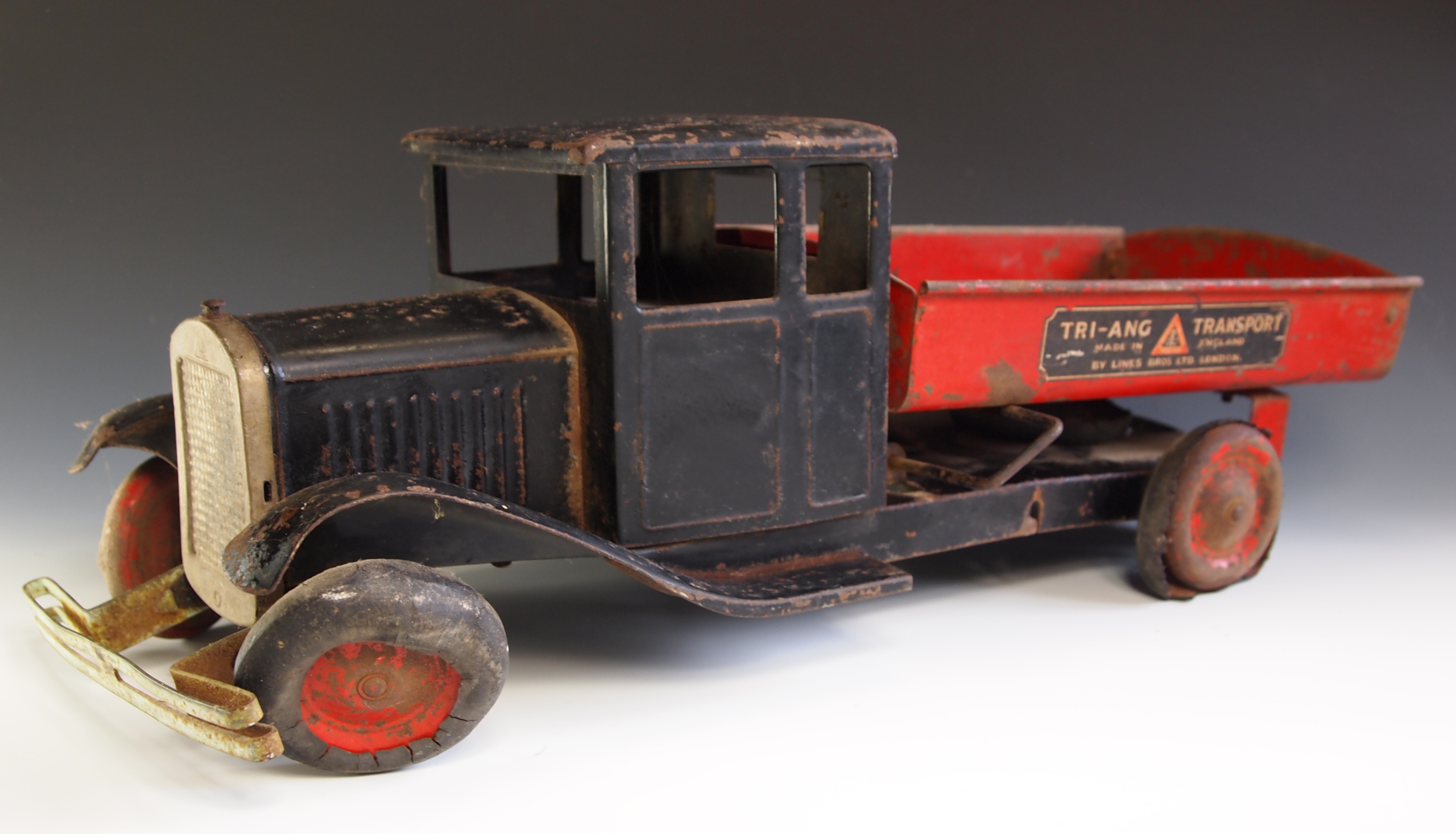
A Triang lorry, early 1930s

The British range of Tri-ang large scale pressed steel vehicles were produced from the early 1930s until the mid-1970s. To the casual onlooker or collector in the world of old toys, these toys are of no great interest, are crude by modern standards and only a few different types are commonly seen.

The most common are the red-bonneted tipper lorry, the bonneted Shell tanker, breakdown lorry and the London Transport double decker bus, with a couple of cranes and a few Puff Puff railway engines.

The full selection of pressed steel vehicles including the different types of cranes and trains consisted of over 200 different types. There were actually nine different series of lorries together with a series of buses, cranes and trains. Tri-ang was one of the largest toy producers in the world and their range of toys reflected this.

The nine different ranges of pressed steel toy lorry were:

- 1930–1937: Metal lorries
- 1937–1956: Bedfords
- 1948–1957: 200 series
- 1955–1960: Diesel series
- 1957–1963: 300 series
- 1959–1966: Thames Traders
- 1958–1967: Junior Diesels
- 1962–1966: Regal Roadsters
- 1966–1973: Hi-ways

All years are approximations

The pressed steel and occasional wooden trains and pressed steel cranes were made during the same lifespan as the lorries. Up until the mid-1950s, most trains were made of wood. The steel buses were manufactured from 1957 up until around 1970. In the Pressed Steel Lorry range there were delivery vans, petrol tankers, breakdown lorries, different types of articulated lorries, rocket launchers, car transporters, circus lorries, mobile shops, Army, RAF and emergency vehicles.

=== Model road vehicles ===
Minic Motorways was a system of HO-scale slot cars. The system aimed as far as possible for realism, and therefore the slot was as narrow as possible (about 1/8 in) with brass conductors placed vertically at each side. The vehicles picked up power via a small wheel, called a Gimbal Wheel, on their underside, which was divided into two halves by an insulating flange.

At some time in the 1960s this mechanism was replaced by a pair of vertically sprung sliding pickups. These differed from that of electric racing car systems such as the same company's Scalextric, in which the electrical conductors were spaced more widely apart on each side of the guide slot, and were hence more stable. There was a small removable peg at the back of the vehicles to stabilize it when in reverse. Vehicles were controlled by a hand-held controller, which had a thumb-operated speed control plus a rotating reversing switch.

The range of vehicles was designed to be complementary to a model railway set, and for instance included a Rolls-Royce Silver Cloud, a Humber Super Snipe, an AEC Routemaster bus, a Shell petrol tanker and a towtruck. The most remarkable vehicle was a Road-Railer, an articulated lorry with a pair of pivoting rear axles, one bearing road wheels and the other rail wheels. The semi-trailer could be remotely uncoupled and then collected by a bogie wagon on the Tri-ang railway system. These could in theory be chained together to compose a train. This vehicle suffered from being underpowered. Vehicles could also be driven aboard a car-carrying wagon in the Tri-ang railway system.

The basic track sections contained two slots, though single-slot pieces also existed. They permitted quite complex road layouts, and included a crossroads, a 4-section roundabout, forks to create dual carriageway sections, right-angle junctions, single-track forks to allow lay-bys, and later a crossover from the left to the right track, with a break in the conductors. Railway compatibility was ensured by a level crossing and road/rail interchange pieces. Curves could be built with up to 5 parallel slots.

Points were manually operated, although third-party electric point solenoids could be fitted.

A range of trackside accessories such as a petrol station and a ferry allowed users to build towns around their systems.

At a late stage of the system's life, an attempt was made to update its image and enter the model racing-car market. Racing car bodies were introduced, which contained more powerful motors with worm drive, and with the improved pickups mentioned above.

The Minic Motorways system allowed the modeller to animate the roads as well as the railways in their townscapes. Some modellers used flexible track manufactured by Peco to enhance the level of realism.

Minic, like Tri-ang railways, used 12-volt direct current with a two 'rail' system, which made reversing loops impossible without an insulated section. The competing German Faller system used alternating current, and had a compatible trolleybus system.

=== Model pond yachts and boats ===
Various model boats were made by Tri-ang companies, early yachts were made of steel under the name of Tri-ang. Tri-ang also sold a range of wooden hulled yachts and clockwork motor launches. They also produced early battery powered electric motor launches. Penguin was a name that they manufactured plastic yachts and clockwork boats and some battery powered electric boats. Over the years these toys/models were manufactured under the name Rovex, Scalex and Minimodels.

=== Model racing cars ===
- Scalextric

B Francis of Minimodels Ltd designed a range of metal model racing cars driven by clockwork in 1952 under the SCALEX brand. To this he later added an electric motor showing the product in 1957. Faced with a demand beyond his capacity to fulfill, Francis sold his company to Tri-ang in 1958. With their mass-manufacturing capability and know-how with plastic, the Rovex subsidiary of Tri-ang converted the metal cars to plastic and extended the range.

=== Model cars ===
When Meccano Ltd faced financial troubles and was acquired by Tri-ang, it also acquired the Dinky Toys range. Tri-ang's own range of model cars, Spot-on, had competed with the Dinky range but never had the success of Dinky and its designs were briefly subsumed into the Dinky range.

=== Model ships ===
Minic Limited, a Lines Bros subsidiary, produced a range of 1:1200 scale waterline ship and harbour models between 1958 and 1965, marketed under the Tri-ang Minic Ships brand. After a reorganisation in the mid-1960s Minic Limited became a subsidiary of Rovex Industries Ltd (later Rovex-Tri-ang Ltd). In 1971, this was acquired by Dunbee Combex Marx (DCM) as Rovex Limited, after Lines Bros went into receivership.

In 1976, Rovex Limited reintroduced a limited range of the original waterline ship and harbour models, together with four new battleships under the name "Minic Ships and Harbours by Hornby", the "Tri-ang" trademark having been acquired by Barclay Securities who purchased Tri-ang-Pedigree Ltd when Lines Bros was liquidated. The Hornby "Second Series" of Minic Ships, which were manufactured in Hong Kong, did not sell well and was discontinued in the late 1970s / early 1980s.

In 2003, the Triang name and Minic trademark were acquired by Charles Shave of Hong Kong. The new company reproduced the original 1960s harbour models, together with a good range of modern merchant vessels and US Navy and Royal Navy warships. Production numbers have been low, but these new "Third Series" models have now been on sale for longer than either of the earlier sets.

=== Other names ===
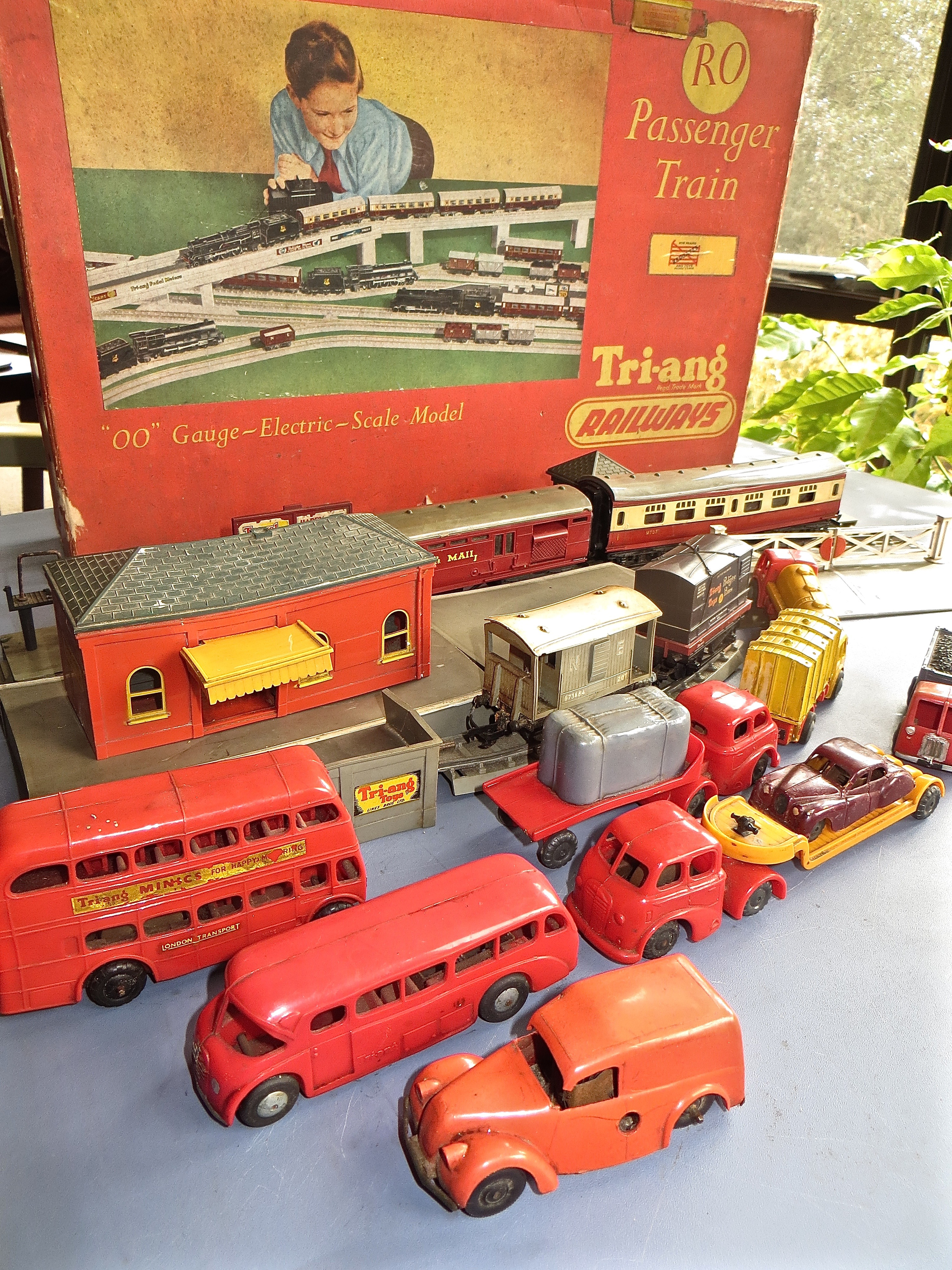
Tri-ang Minic vehicles last appeared in the 1961 7th edition of the Tri-ang Railways catalogue. The clockwork minic in the foreground dates from the early 50s.

- Arrow jigsaw puzzles
- Pennybrix,
- Pedigree Prams and dolls,
- Minic vehicles,
- Minix cars,
- Minimodels,
- Miniville,
- Minic waterline ships
- Minic Motorways,
- Sindy,
- Arkitex construction kits (two scales),
- Frog construction kits,
- Wrenn Railways

There were associated companies overseas selling Tri-ang under their own brand names. e.g.: A.T.T. in the U.S.A.

=== World War II ===
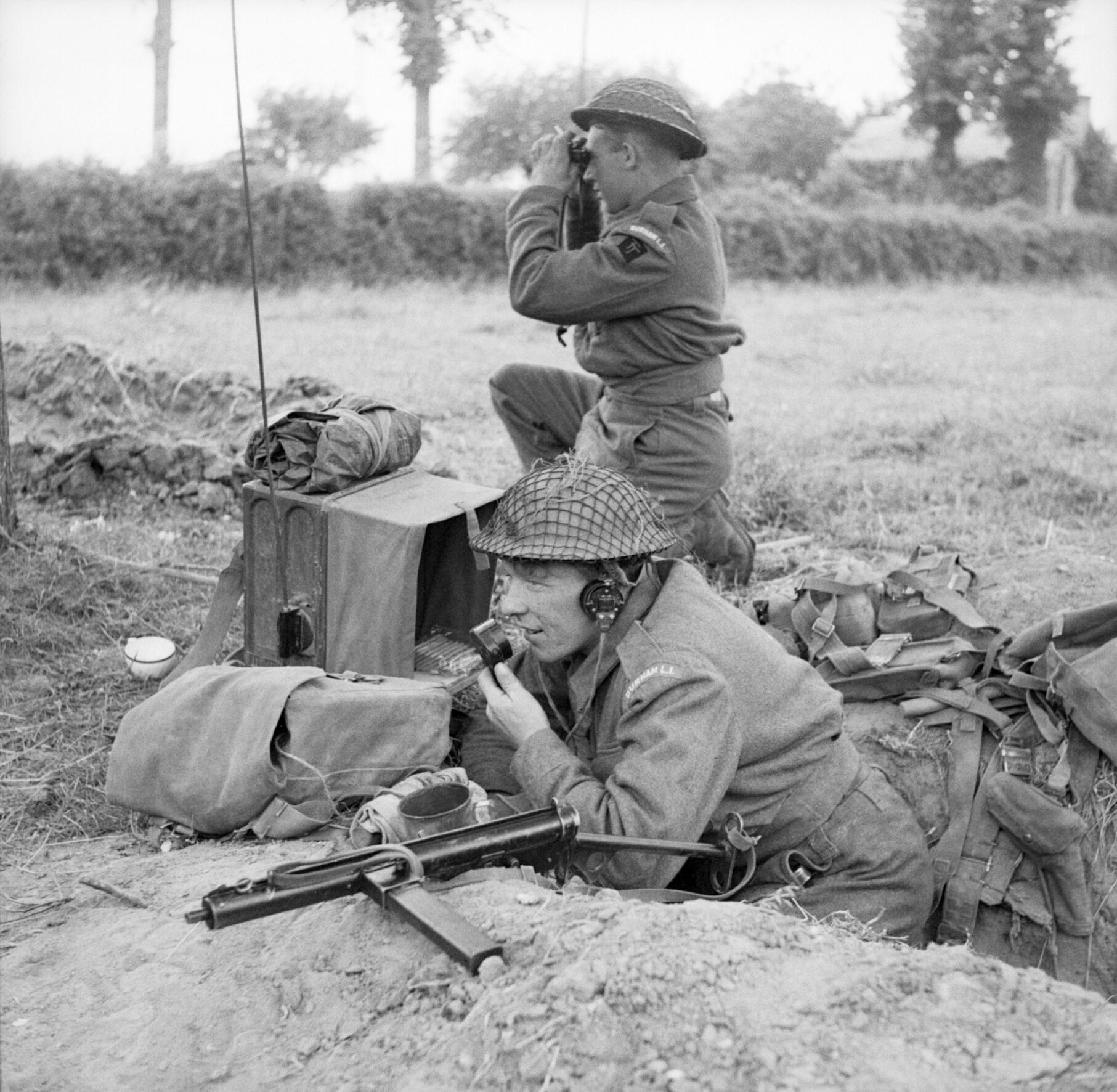
Soldiers of Durham Light Infantry with a Sten Mk III manufactured by Lines Bros.

In World War II, Lines Brothers was a major manufacturer of the Sten submachine gun.
