= Strategic Choice Theory =

In organizational theory, a topic in sociology and social psychology, strategic choice theory describes the role that leaders or leading groups play in influencing an organization through making choices in a dynamic political process. Previous to this theory, a common view was that organizations were thought to be designed along operational requirements based on the external environment. Strategic choice theory provided an alternative that emphasized the agency of individuals and groups within organizations to make choices, sometimes serving their own ends, that dynamically influenced the development of those organizations. These strategic choices formed part of an organizational learning process that adapted to the external environment as well as the internal political situation.

Apart from (but complementary to) organizational settings, strategic choice theory was studied with regard to individual's responses in ordinary, everyday disputes. Findings include that both complainants and respondents used a variety of strategies that changed over time in an effort to resolve the dispute.

== History ==
=== Origin ===
The model of strategic choice was made when the relations of industries inside the United States were quickly changing. The model/theory was created because other contemporary models/theories were anchored in industries that were stagnant. A majority of the theories had been made when everything was relatively still, and since they were made with that background the theories had a difficult time explaining the change. Therefore, since the Industries were in rapid change there became a need to explain why the industries are changing. The basic model begins by factoring in purposive, intentionalist, rational explanations of their actions and any action done by another person that affect the decision of the decision makers. The variables included can be condensed to any forces outside the environment that would have an effect on the person making the choices. For an example an environmental factor that can change an industries values is the civil rights movement.

=== Usage ===
The spread of this theory has been credited to a multitude of researchers. One person was Alfred Chandler jr. in 1962 his research was on the relationship between strategy and structure. Two other people that have been given credit to the bloom of this research field is J.S. Bain in 1968 and Michael Porter in 1980, who are both industrial organization economists. These researches were mostly using the theory to study industries, but they did have problems in the research. The two problems of the earlier research were that most of the research uses different centers as a point of reference. The second problem is that most researches focuses on how the choices are made and not what comes from those choices. The choice to use this strategic choice theory in industrial relations is contained by two things. The first is that the person making the decisions are only available to happen when they have direct control of what they do. This means that if the person who is making the decisions has to be able to decide freely. The second is that the decision has an effect on others.

== See also ==
- Organization studies
- Outline of organizational theory
