= Toy forts and castles =

A toy fort is a miniature fortress or castle that is used as a setting to stage battles using toy soldiers. Toy forts come in many shapes and sizes; some are copies of existing historical structures, while others are imagined with specific elements to enable realistic play, such as moats, drawbridges, and battlements. Toy fort designs range from the châteaux of Europe to the stockade forts of the American wild west.

== History ==
Toy forts and castles first appeared at the beginning of the nineteenth century in Germany, a country that dominated the world of toy manufacturing up until WW1. The earliest examples came as a set of generic wooden blocks which could be configured in many different ways. As time went on, some of these sets were designed to portray specific structures associated with real battles.

Around 1850 dollhouse manufacturers started to apply their production methods and capabilities towards the production of toy forts and castles. Sets would consist of wooden components, some blocks and some flat, painted to depict details such as stone, brick, windows, arches and vegetation. The parts would be shipped in a box which was designed to be inverted and then used as the base for the toy fort. This design became the standard design for toy forts and castles for the next 100 years.

The Germans dominated the toy fort market until about 1900 when other manufacturers from France, Denmark, Britain, and the USA started to appear on the scene. As technology progressed, new materials were used in the manufacturing of toy forts including tin, zinc alloy, composition, cardboard, hardboard, MDF, and finally plastics.

== Manufacturers ==
The three best-known manufacturers of toy forts were Moritz Gottschalk (Germany), O. and M. Hausser (Germany), and Lines Bros. (Great Britain).

=== Germany ===
- Christian Hacker
- Moritz Gottschalk (1840—1905) started his career as a bookbinder, but by the age of 25 had branched off into children's toys which would eventually lead to him becoming one of the world's most influential toy makers of the late 19th to early 20th centuries. He started with the dollhouses that he is most famous for and quickly went from a cottage industry to running a factory. Once his infrastructure was in place he was able to diversify adding the manufacture of other toy buildings such as forts, stables, and grocery stores to his repertoire.

=== Spain ===
- Reamsa
