= Tri-ang Railways =

British toy trains manufacturer

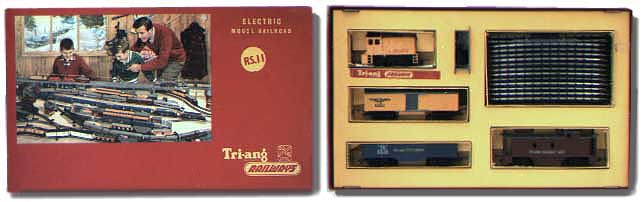
A boxed Tri-ang railway set.

Tri-ang Railways was a British manufacturer of toy trains, one of the elements of the Lines Bros Ltd company who traded using the brands Tri-ang, Minic, Pedigree, and Frog. The Tri-ang Railways name was dropped a few years after Lines Bros took over the Hornby name although the majority of the trains were still the original Tri-ang models.

== History ==
=== Tri-ang name ===
Brothers George and Joseph Lines made wooden toys in the Victorian age, their company being G & J Lines Ltd. Joseph was the active partner, while George went into farming. Joseph (or Joe) had four sons. Three of these – William, Walter and Arthur Edwin Lines – formed Lines Bros Ltd shortly after World War I. Three Lines make a triangle, hence the Tri-ang name. Arthur's son, Richard Lines, was largely responsible for the Tri-ang Railways system.

=== Foundation of Tri-ang Railways ===
In 1946, Rovex Plastics Ltd was founded by Alexander Gregory Vanetzian, who made toys for Marks & Spencer. Venetzian was asked to develop an electric toy train set for Christmas 1950 and did so. Although the company had found larger premises in a former brewery in Richmond, it was constrained financially. Lines Bros were looking to expand into railways and so they purchased Rovex. Their products were sold under the Tri-ang Railways name from 1951. In 1954, to give room for development they moved the company, now Rovex Scale Models Ltd, to a brand new factory built at Margate, in Kent.

From 1966 to 1972, a battery powered plastic 0 gauge range called the Big Big train was sold. Some, but not all of the moulds from these were later sold and used by other manufacturers, including Novo in the USSR and Lima in Italy.

As well as 00/H0 gauge, Tri-ang made TT gauge models from 1957 to at least 1967. The 3mm Society supports those who still model Tri-ang TT.

J. H. Doyle, managing director of Rovex Scale Models joined Rovex Plastic Ltd in its early days. His responsibilities within Tri-ang were the development of the OO/HO range and he was "a prime mover in starting and promoting" the TT gauge.

Tri-ang also manufactured a garden railway system called Tri-ang Minic Narrowgauge Railway, known as TMNR. This was a 10.25" gauge passenger carrying system, using 2 rail electric pick-up with motors running at 40 volts DC. It was produced in the early 1960s and not a commercial success, with less than 90 sets being produced.

=== Expansion and name changes ===
The success of Tri-ang meant that British competitors Trix and Hornby Dublo were affected. In 1964, Hornby Dublo, a division of Meccano Ltd, had stopped production and Meccano Ltd invited Lines Bros. Ltd to buy them out. Tri-ang purchased the company including a large amount of stock. The combined toy railway was marketed as Tri-ang Hornby. Production of the Tri-ang models continued and a supplementary catalogue was published in May 1966 to show both Tri-ang and Hornby Dublo items.

In 1971, the Lines Bros empire collapsed and was broken up. The model railways, then marketed as Tri-ang Hornby, were sold to the Dunbee-Combex-Marx group. The rights to the Tri-ang brand were sold elsewhere. With the Hornby name being established and recognised, from 1 January 1972 the model railways were rebranded Hornby Railways.

== Models ==
In April 1963, Railway Modeller reviewed the ex-L.N.E.R. B12 locomotive which had the new Magnadhesion, with magnets close to the wheels, to improve traction with Tri-ang steel track.

=== Australian and New Zealand models ===
A number of Tri-ang models specific to Australia were produced by Moldex in Melbourne during the 1960s, including:

- NSW 1955-type suburban electric motor car and driving trailer car.
- Victorian B class double-ended diesel locomotive in 'Transaustralia' livery.
- A blue version of NSW 1955-type suburban cars pretending to be a Victorian EMU was planned but never produced

Other models were manufactured in Auckland, New Zealand, and were mainly the same as those made in England, although there were variations.

Some Super-4 track was produced in Australia.

The Australian and New Zealand models were produced in 00 gauge only.

=== Canadian train sets and models ===
Lines Bros. (Canada) Ltd. was incorporated on 24 March 1947. The thistle trademark used in Canada was registered by Joseph Lines, the co-founder of G. & J. Lines Ltd., in 1910. The main factory and warehouse facility was located at 4000 St. Patrick Street, Montreal, Quebec. The Canadian company struggled to make acceptable profits and it was thought that profits could be increased with a wider range of toys. The Tri-ang Railways Transcontinental range of models was devised specifically with this in mind, and by Christmas 1954 the first sets began to appear in the shops.

However, the models were produced too quickly, without sufficient attention to detail and lacked realism. Without proper consideration to what the Canadian market demanded, the models were not popular, although they sold well enough in the UK. Historically, standard train sets were imported into Canada from the UK, initially only the Transcontinental range of models.

Between 1957 and 1974, a number of sets were produced exclusively for the general Canadian market, as well as some special sets commissioned by department store chains and / or mail order companies, including Simpsons and Simpsons-Sears, Eaton's, Woodward's and the Hudson's Bay Company. No models were made in Canada. The Canadian company assembled a wide range of sets from both boxed and unboxed models sent out to them from the Margate factory.

From 1965 a new full-colour Canadian catalogue was produced. Previously the UK catalogue had been used, and supplemented up until 1962 by an illustrated price list.

Initially, a number of Canadian National Railway (CNR) models were introduced specifically for the Canadian market. In 1967, models representing the Canadian Pacific Railway (CPR) began to appear. Of note were the representations of the transcontinental passenger trains which have become firm favourites with collectors of Tri-ang Railways.

=== South African models ===
A limited number of models were manufactured in Durban, South Africa. These are very rare.

== See also ==
- Hornby Railways
