= Rocrail =

Software package for model train operation

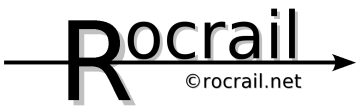
- Original author: Robert Jan Versluis
- Developer: Rocrail team
- Initial release: 2002 (24 years ago)
- Stable release: 2.1.5322 / 10 December 2024 (16 months ago)
- Written in: C++ for the server wxWidgets for rocview
- Operating system: Linux Windows macOS Raspberry Pi OS
- License: Proprietary software
- Website: wiki.rocrail.net

Rocrail is a freeware software package for controlling a model train layout from one or more computers. Users can run trains directly from a computer, or have some run automatically with manual control for any others.

== Architecture ==
Rocrail uses a client-server architecture that communicates via TCP/IP, and the client and server do not need to be on the same computer. Rocrail can be used from a single computer connected directly to the layout, or via any other computer on a home network, or over the Internet. Rocrail also has an HTTP interface, which will let the layout run from a web browser. An Android app is available.

The server program runs on a computer connected to the layout by one of the standard computer interface setups, and supports many command stations.

The Rocrail client connects to the server over a network. The client can also be used by itself to plan layouts. There is no need for the server or the layout to be running to edit plans. Plans can be uploaded to the server after creation.

Rocrail runs under both the Windows, MacOS and Linux operating systems, using the Wxwidgets toolkit.

== A partial list of supported command stations and protocols ==
- Dinamo track driver system
- Digitrax LocoNet
- Easydcc
- ESU ECoS
- DCC++
- Hornby Elite (XPressNet)
- Lenz Elektronik XPressNet
- Littfinski HSI88
- Märklin 6050/6051 and Central Station 1 & 2
- OpenDCC
- RocoNet
- Roco/Fleischmann Z21
- Selectrix
- SRCP connections such as DDL and Roc-Pi
- Uhlenbrock's Intellibox
- Zimo

== Features ==
- Automatic and manual modes
- Modular layout support
- Built-in DCC/MM Digital Direct Control Station
- Operates unlimited digital systems simultaneously
- Only one feedback contact per block required
- Runs on Linux, Mac OS X and Microsoft Windows systems beginning with Windows 7 (Windows 10 or higher recommended)
- Multilanguage support
- Symbol themes in SVG
- Fiddle Yard support
- Smartphone app
- Up to four Gamepads can be used as throttles
- Built in DCC programmer (Rocpro)
- Raspberry Pi (Model B) supported

== Users ==
Many users have already registered themselves at the Rocrail Forum. Some of them are actively translating the Wiki into their own language. Others are developing open-source hardware to contribute to the project.

== Open source ==
Rocrail was released under GPL v3, but during September 2015, its license was changed to a proprietary model.
