= TT scale =

Model railway scale

TT Scale
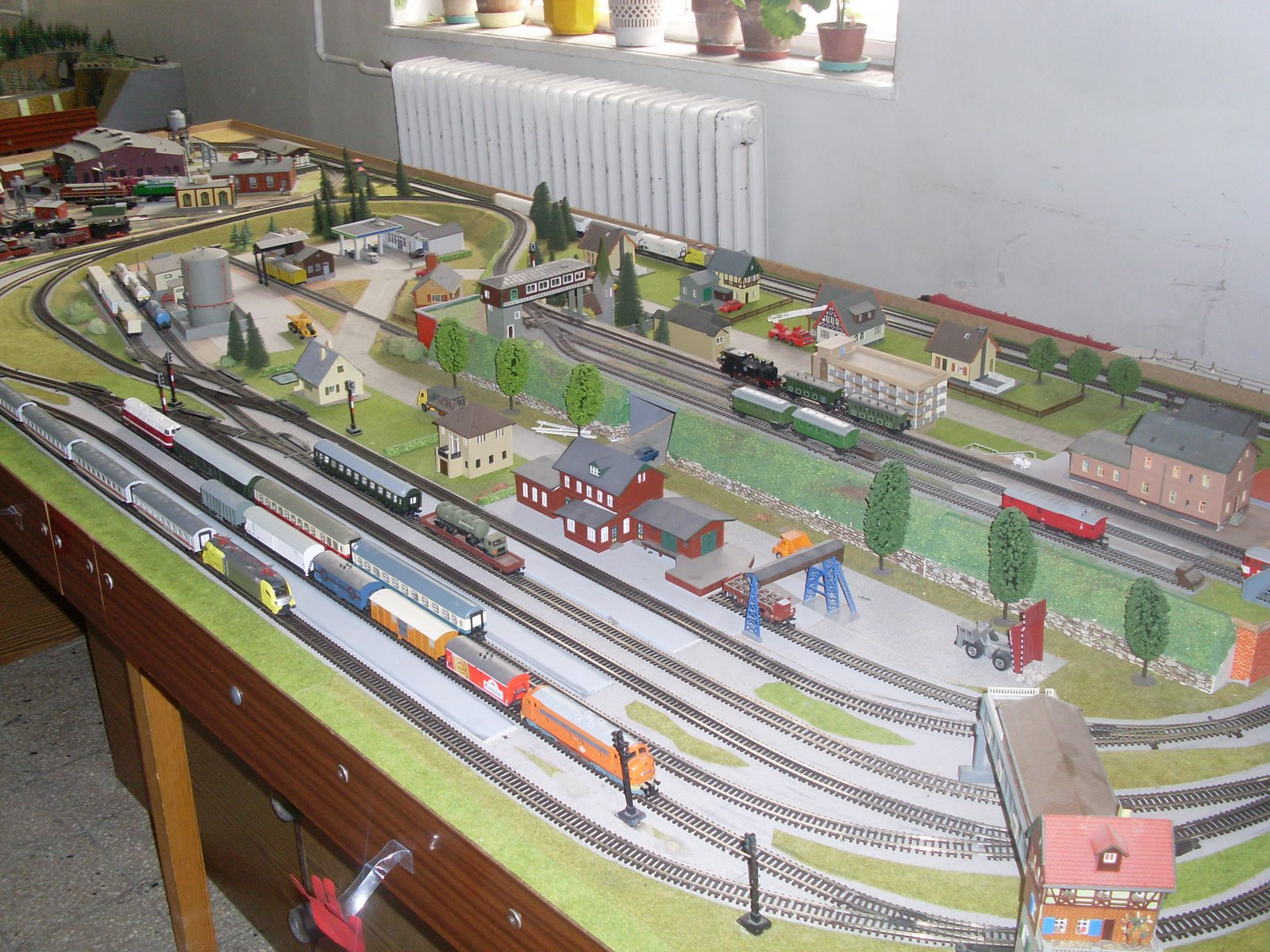
- TT scale model railroad
- Scale: 1/10 in (2.54 mm) to 1 ft (305 mm)
- Scale ratio: 1:120
- Standard(s): NEM, NMRA
- Model gauge: 12 mm (0.472 in)
- Prototype gauge: Standard gauge

TT scale (from "table top") is a model railroading scale at 1:120 scale with a track gauge of 12 mm between the rails. It is placed between HO scale (1:87) and N scale (1:160). Its original purpose, as the name suggests, was to make a train set small enough to assemble and operate on a tabletop.

The scale originated in the USA, but is today widespread mainly in Central Europe, thanks to Rokal and "Berliner-TT-Bahnen", defunct German manufacturers of train sets in TT. It is the second-most popular scale in Central Europe and Russia, after HO, with several manufacturers based in countries such as Germany and the Czech Republic, and was reintroduced to the United Kingdom in 2022. Adherents to the scale maintain it is the smallest practical scale, especially for those who like to build models from scratch.

In wargaming, TT scale equals the 15 mm scale where the height of "standard" 180 cm (5 ft 11 in) soldier height is 15 mm (0.59 in).

== History ==
TT scale was invented in the United States by Hal Joyce, a former automotive designer. He founded a company, H. P. Products, in 1945, and the first advertisement appeared in 1946. The product line included locomotive kits, passenger and freight car kits, track and detail parts. By the early 1950s, it had a following, offering less detail than HO—considered by some to be an advantage at the time—and a lower price than most other scales. Numerous other companies began offering TT scale trains, track, and accessories as well. In the immediate period afterward, several other American manufacturers also began production of TT items, notably the Kemtron Corporation (founded by Levon Kemalyan), which manufactured metal castings in several scales.

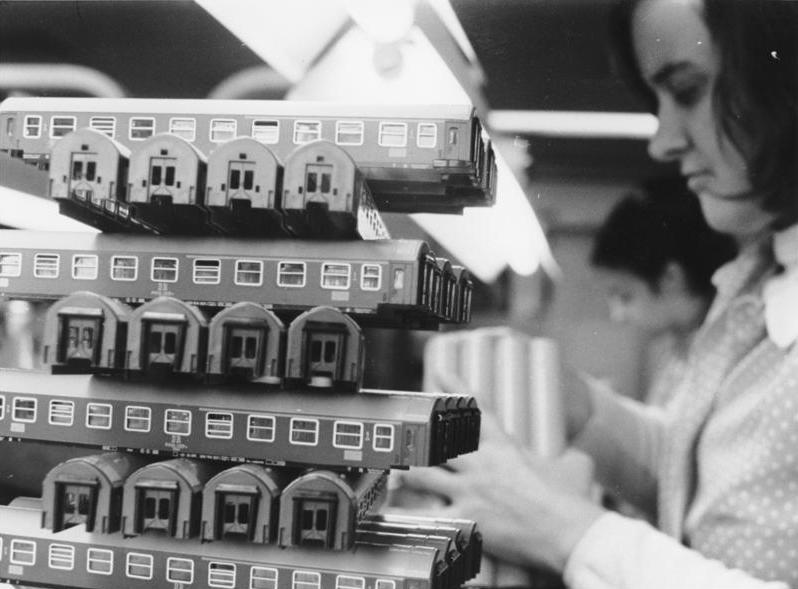
Zeuke model trains became popular, and the models were produced in large quantities.

In Europe, Rokal and Zeuke (which became Berliner-TT-Bahnen and ultimately Tillig) began production in West and East Germany respectively towards the end of the 1950s. British Tri-ang Railways also introduced the scale to the UK, but due to the smaller British loading gauge, the trains were scaled up to 1:101.6 (or 3 mm scale) to have room for motors and other electric equipment. For a while the scale enjoyed considerable success, but it was not meant to last.

By the early 1960s, TT had been eclipsed in popularity by N scale, which is even smaller. Tri-ang quit the scale in 1967, and H. P. Products discontinued manufacturing their TT line in 1968. In West Germany, Rokal was sold to competitor Wesa (which marketed their own 13 mm-track, 1:100 scale), and production ended in 1969.

In East Germany, then on the other side of the Iron Curtain, production continued. Berliner-TT-Bahnen, which had superseded Zeuke, widened its offerings and exported trains and tracks over most of the Eastern Bloc. As the range became more and more comprehensive, offering not only trains and tracks but also accessories such as signals, lights and working catenaries, it became a serious contender to HO. During the 1980s, train sets were also exported to the West, offered as simple and cheap entry-models to the hobby and earning East Germany much-needed hard currency.

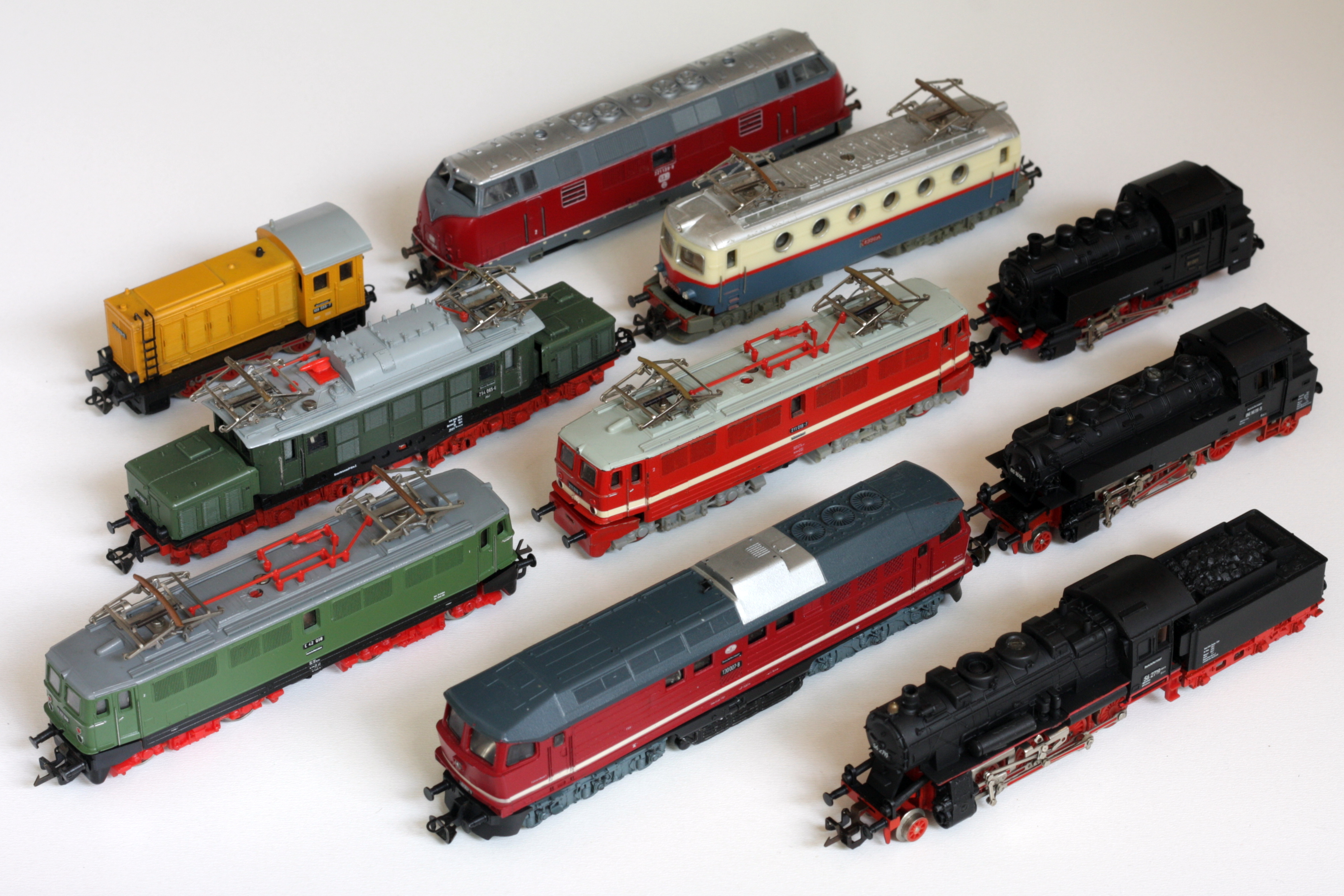
Model trains from Berliner-TT-Bahnen range in TT scale.

With the end of the Cold War, the East German economy was liberalised. Berliner-TT-Bahnen started to update their offerings, but soon ran into financial hardship. The company eventually ended up in the hands of Tillig, still today the largest provider of TT equipment. The products were improved, with better technology and more details, to bring them up to date with the offer in other scales.

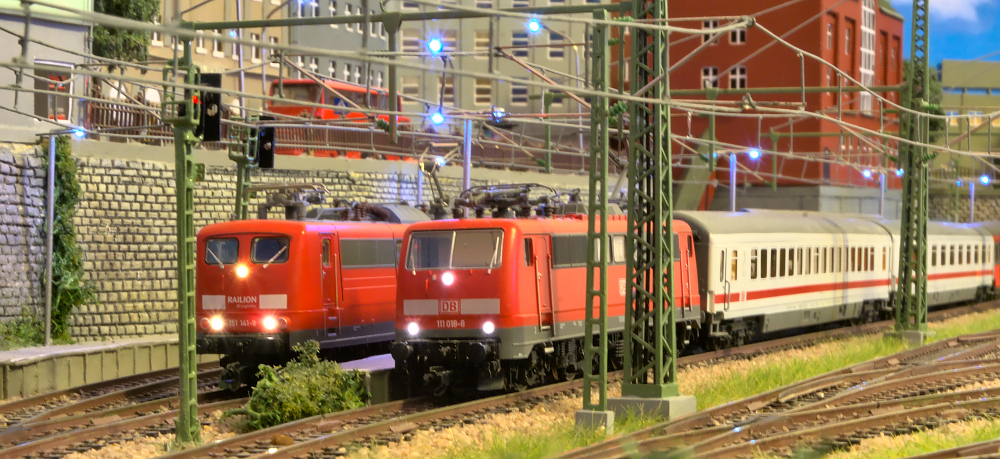
Model trains from Kuehn and Piko in TT scale.

In the 1990s and 2000s, several other companies started to offer models in TT, including major brands such as Piko and Roco, but these decades also saw the emergence of brands such as Kuehn, Beckmann and Kres, which all have made their mark in the scale. Since then, interest in the scale has grown, and more models are now available than in Z scale, and TT has come close to rivaling N (at least for European models), not the least with the 2022 entry of British Hornby and their new TT:120 range.

There is also a number of Russian manufacturers such as Peresvet (Пересвет) and TT-Model (ТТ-Модель) which produce TT scale locomotives and wagons of various prototypes in many liveries and schemes. With the emergence of 3D modeling software and 3D printing, many modelists in Russia have started to produce a vast variety of rolling stock and locomotives of their own in TT scale. TT is currently the second most popular scale after HO in Russia with a 40.9% market share behind HO with 46.9%.

=== United Kingdom ===
==== British TT 3 mm scale ====
Traditional British TT, or TT3, was introduced by Tri-ang in 1957 and uses a 3 mm : 1 ft (305 mm) scale- that is, 1:101.6- rather than the 1:120 scale of standard TT. The reason for the slightly larger scale was that the available motors in the 1950s were too large to fit in the British loading gauge. The simple solution was, just like in choosing OO over HO and as later would happen in N gauge, to make the trains slightly larger but keeping the track at international scale.

The "Three Millimetre Society" is a British-based society which caters for railway modellers of 3 mm scale. This society was formed in 1965, when Tri-ang discontinued commercial production of the format after eight years, leaving it with negligible commercial support in the UK.

Since then, British TT and 3mm have survived as almost exclusively enthusiast-driven niche formats. The aims of the society are to encourage modellers working in this scale, and it produces a quarterly magazine and assists with the production of locomotive and rolling stock kits, components and the supply of secondhand items and spares.

==== British TT:120 ====
TT was reduced to a niche scale in Britain with the fall of Tri-ang, and remained so for a long time. In 2022, however, first PECO and then later Hornby announced a return to 12 mm track. This time around, though, it was 1:120 scale all the way through without any size compromises (in British terms 2.54 mm to the foot or one tenth of an inch to the foot). The news was first announced in June 2022 by PECO. The company launched its new TT:120 scale 12 mm gauge code 55 track and UK prototype accessories. Writing in the Peco Publications & Publicity magazine, Railway Modeller, editor Craig Tiley stated, "To explain: rather than perpetuating the hybrid combination of 3 mm:1 ft scale and 12 mm gauge track that was adopted by Tri-ang for its TT range during the 1950s and '60s, Peco has instead chosen the accurate scale and gauge combination of 2.54 mm:1 ft on 12 mm track. This equates to a ratio of 1:120 (hence the term TT:120) which represents a brand new scale for commercial items in British outline."

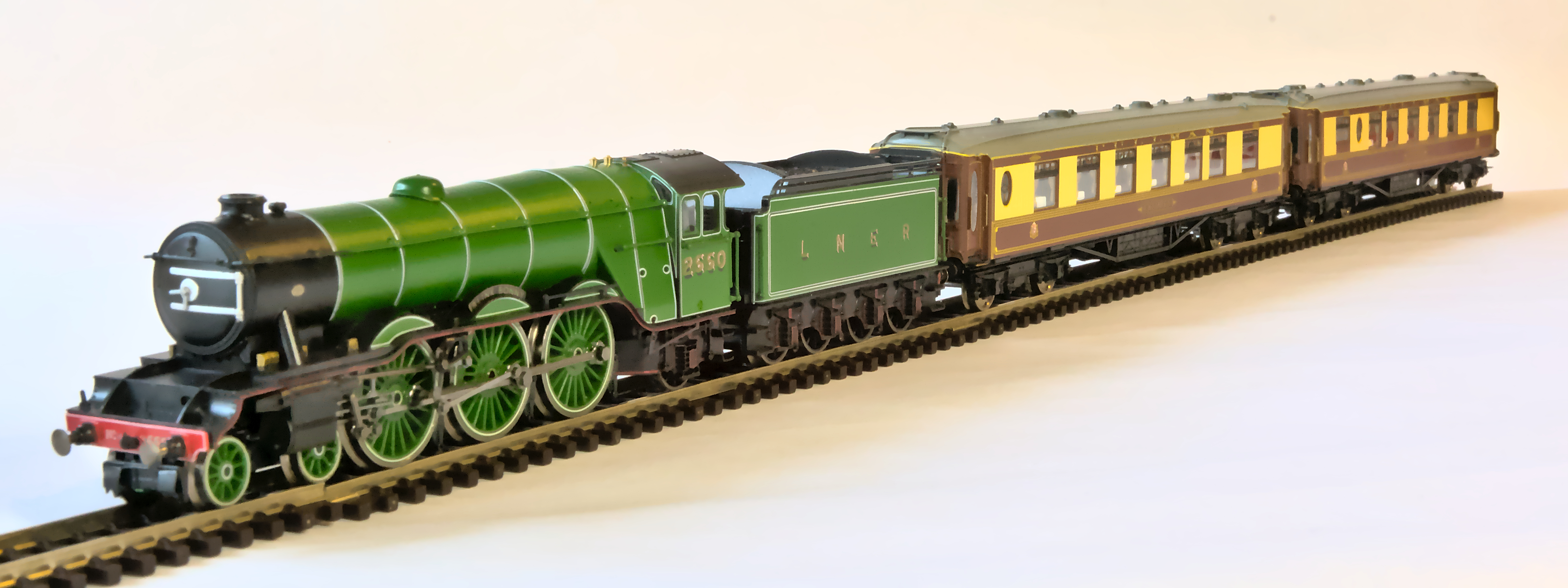
A Hornby TT:120 LNER A1 model with Pullman coaches

On the same date as PECO's unveiling of their range, UK-based manufacturer Gaugemaster announced plans to introduce a new range of products for TT:120 scale, which could have included Class 66 locomotives, subject to demand. In their October 2022 newsletter Gaugemaster stated, "Following Hornby’s news that they have developed an expansive range of TT:120 products which they intend to supply exclusively via their own website, it makes little or no commercial sense for us to develop a complimentary range of products in this scale."

In October 2022, British brand Hornby released its new range of TT:120. Two train sets are being offered, with four series of locomotives and rolling stock available. This range was only available from Hornby's own website and it was not available from other retailers in the UK. In Australia it is sold via a third party distributor. Starting in October 2023 TT:120 became available via a number of retail outlets.

== Manufacturers ==
Currently Tillig is the largest provider of TT scale models. Most TT scale track sold today is made by Tillig, which offers both standard model railroad track and an integrated roadbed track using Kato's Unijoiner system. But the growing interest for the scale has led to more manufacturers during the last few years, and the scale has also attracted some of the big actors within other scales. Roco launched their first TT products in 1998, and has a small but growing line. Smaller producers like Kuehn and BeckmannTT have widened their product lines in recent years, as have Dutch PSK Modelbouw and Czech MTB, which specializes in Czech, Slovak and Polish models.

Russian Peresvet is another manufacturer who produces TT scale models of mostly Russian prototypes. German large scale manufacturer PIKO has also started with a TT line, focusing mainly on German stock, and offer locomotives, wagons and several EMUs. Arnold launched their first new TT models since being bought by Hornby in 2014, and has a small but growing offer. In 2022 Hornby also announced their new TT programme with British trains, offering a wide range of locomotives, carriages and accessories, reintroducing the scale in Britain.

There is greater variety in the accessories market, where some companies have a long-time involvement with the scale and others recently started to support it as well. Prototypes are mainly German and Central European, with a wide offering of models from Czech, Slovak, Polish, Swiss and Austrian environments. Suppliers of accessories include Auhagen, Noch and Viessmann. British Triang produced a Continental/French range but it was only made for a very short while.

The scale is uncommon outside Central Europe, with a few manufacturers in other parts of the world. One current producer of British TT is 3 mm Scale Model Railways who supply updated GEM and BEC TT kits as well as a large range of Brass Etch and Resin body kits. American manufacturers include Possum Valley Models (kits), Sleepy Hollow/Gold Coast (ready to run and kits, Costal Engineering (kits) DnS TT Track and others.

TT manufacturers (incomplete):

- Auhagen - landscape material
- Beckmann - trains
- Fischer-Modell - trains
- Gützold - trains
- Herpa - landscape material
- Hornby - Locomotives, rolling stock, track, accessories, digital system
- IGRA - wagons and buildings
- Kres - trains
- MTB - trains
- Noch - landscape material
- Peresvet (Пересвет) - freight and passenger rolling stock
- Piko - trains, digital system
- PMT - trains
- Polák - landscape material
- PSK Modellbouw - trains
- Roco - trains, track, accessories, digital system
- SDV Model - wagon kits
- Sommerfeldt - catenaries
- Tillig - trains, track, accessories, digital system
- TT-Model (ТТ-Модель) - freight and passenger rolling stock
- Viessmann - accessories, catenaries

== Track systems ==
There are several track systems available in the scale. Tillig offers two different tracks: with track bed and without. The latter system is considerably more developed, while the former has a more limited choice but comes with two different kinds of track bed. Most TT modellers use one of these two, partially because of the widespread availability. The smallest recommended turn radius is 310 mm, but track with tighter curves, 267 mm, is available. Most rolling stock, however, is designed to work on the 310 mm curves, and might not work on smaller radii.

German manufacturer Kuehn offered a track system which is now marketed by Roco. The geometry differs slightly from Tillig's system, but the two are compatible although with some minor differences.

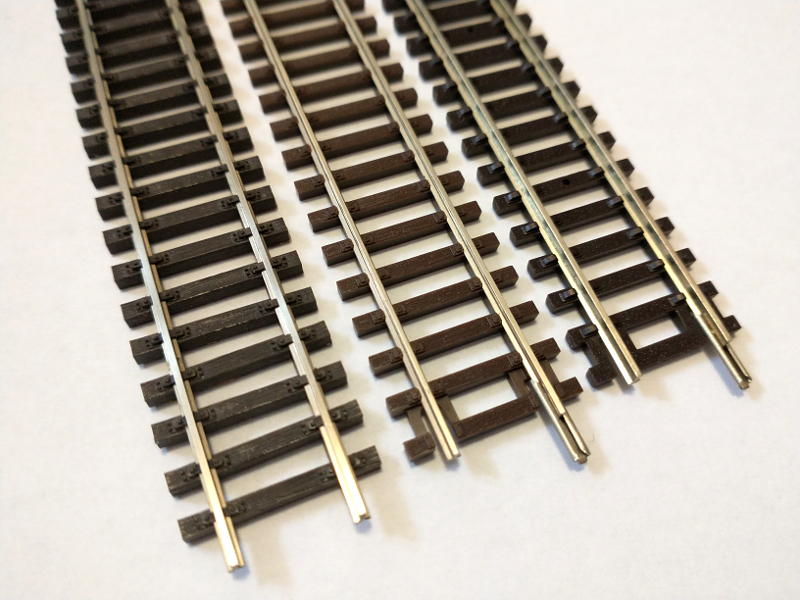
TT scale track from Tillig (left), Kuehn (middle) and Hornby (right).

With Hornby's entry into the scale in 2022, a completely new track system was launched. While having its own distinct appearance, the geometry is in most aspects the same as Tillig's track.

There are several other track systems on the market, although with smaller choice of track pieces. German TTFiligran offers very delicate fine-scale track, and the old, u-shaped track of Berliner TT Bahnen is still available used in large quantities. Czech manufacturer DK-Model also offers a limited range of TTe narrow gauge track, consisting of points and flexible track. Moreover, the British manufacturer PECO introduced Streamline Flexible Track and Medium Radius Turn-Outs with code 55 rail in June 2022.

== Standards ==
Standards useful to both manufacturers and modellers are maintained by MOROP in Europe. These standards are generally the same for such elements as track gauge, scale ratio, couplings, and electrical power, and differ for clearances and other factors that are specific to the prototype being modelled.

TT scale locomotives are powered by DC motors which accept a maximum of 12 V DC. In traditional DC control, the speed of the train is determined by the amount of voltage supplied to the rails. The direction of the train is determined by the polarity of the power to the rails, where the positive rail is on the right, in direction of movement. Digital train control systems have, just as in other scale, become more and more common. The most popular digital control systems used in TT scale model railways is NMRA-DCC, most commonly using systems from Roco, Uhlenbrock, Kuehn, Piko or Tillig.

There are several coupler systems used in TT. Rokal and Zeuke had simple hook-and-ring systems for their model, but these are rarely used anymore. Berliner TT Bahnen introduced a modernized coupler in the 70s, and this is still today the standard coupler on models from some manufacturers. The most common today, however, is the Tillig close-coupler system, and most ready-to-run models are equipped with this. There are also different systems for magnetic couplers, permanent couplers and so on, and some modellers also use Kadee-style couplers.

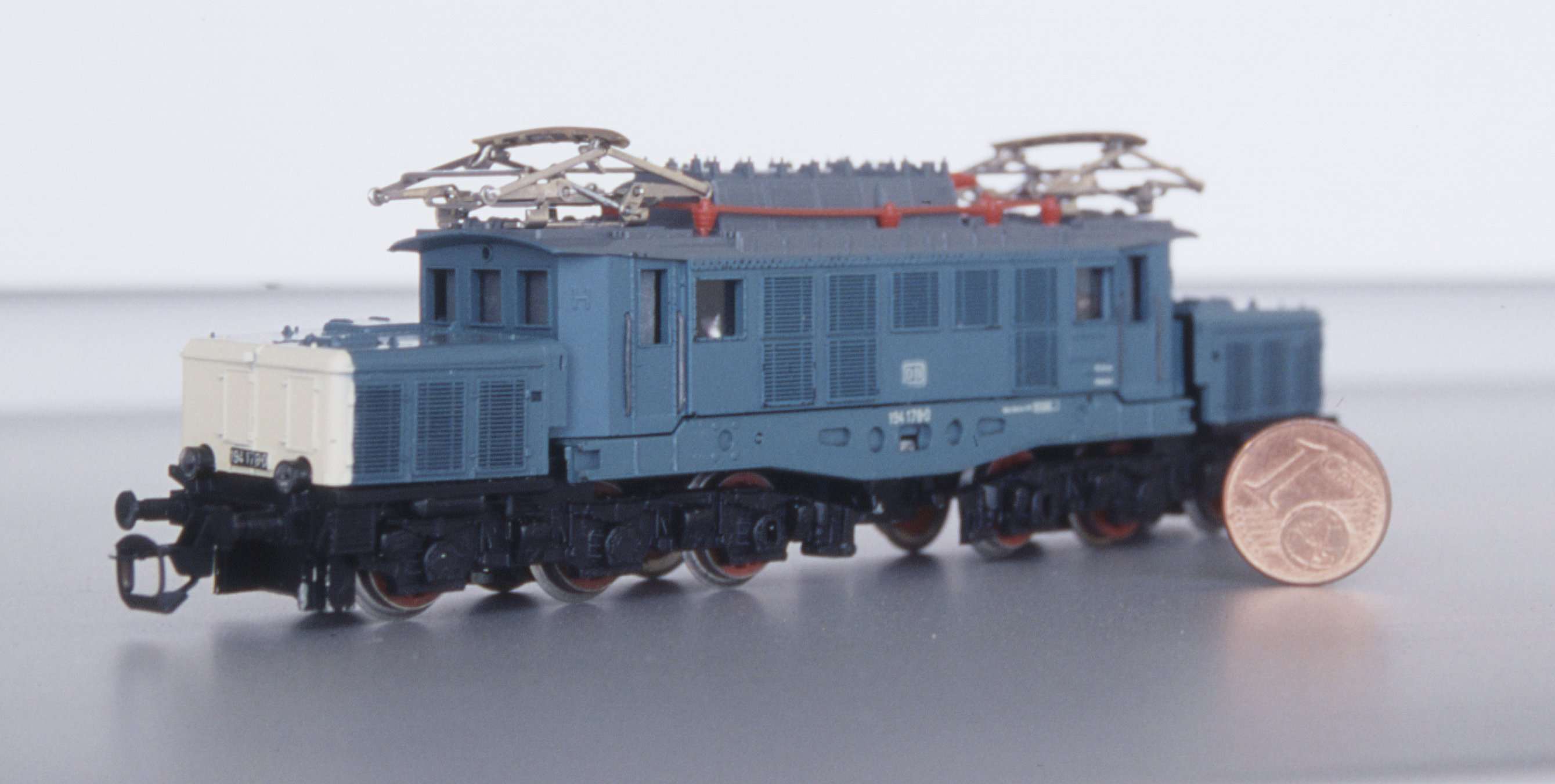
A DR class 94 from Berliner-TT-bahnen. The older hook-and-ring coupler is still in use by PIKO, while most other manufacturers use versions of Tillig's close-coupler

Most TT scale rolling stock made today is equipped with coupling pockets according to the standard NEM358, so all models have interchangeable couplings.

== Gauges ==
According to NEM Normen Europäischer Modellbahnen standards, 1:120 scale trains should use the following gauges:

Name	Kind of track	Model gauge	Real-world gauge	Can be used for
TT	Standard gauge	12 mm	1435 mm	from 1250 mm to 1700 mm
TTm	Meter gauge	9 mm	1000 mm	from 850 mm to < 1250 mm
TTe	Narrow gauge	6,5 mm	750 mm, 760 mm and 800 mm	from 650 mm to < 850 mm
TTi (TTf)	Field railway	4,5 mm	500 mm and 600 mm	from 400 mm to < 650 mm

In New Zealand TTm is known as NZ120, and is growing in popularity as a means of modelling the nation's 3 ft 6 in (1,067 mm) gauge railway network. In Japan TTm is also used to represent 3 ft 6 in (1,067 mm) gauge railways under the name "TT-9", and has had limited commercial support from manufacturers such as Tenshodo.

Several scales also use TT gauge but with a larger scale to represent narrow gauge railways. The most common are HOn3½ gauge (which represents 1067 mm gauge in 1/87 HO scale) and H0m gauge (representing metre gauge track also for 1/87 HO scale).

== See also ==
- List of rail transport modelling scale standards
- Rail transport modelling scales
