= Rokal =

ROKAL is an acronym for RObert KAhrmann Lobberich, a manufacturer of metal castings that produced a line of model railway equipment in TT scale from 1947 to 1969, based in Lobberich 80 km north of Cologne, Germany at the Dutch border.

The Rokal product line was sold to Willy Ade of Röwa. Röwa issued at least one catalog that included items from the Rokal product line, but apparently only sold existing inventory from the Rokal purchase rather than manufacturing these items. Ade later sold his company to Roco of Salzburg, Austria and the Rokal TT line was not issued again.

The Rokal product line was of slightly different proportions from other TT scale lines. In later years of production, Rokal worked in joint venture with firms located in the former country of East Germany. The products of these companies were offered by Rokal with the Rokal style coupler and offered in their own product line with their proprietary coupler. These companies apparently used the same set of manufacturing tooling, marketing these items under names such as Zeuke, Zeuke & Wegworth, Berliner TT-Bahnen (now Tillig) and possibly others.
