= Digital model railway control systems =

Digital model railway control systems are computer-based control system for the programming and operation of locomotives on model railways. While traditional analogue systems control the speed and the direction of a train by adjusting the voltage on the track, digital command systems allows users to program locomotives through a controller. There are a number of digital model railway control systems available for purchase and because they are based on computer technology rather than hardware, these systems provide modellers with a simplified and flexible alternative to analogue systems that may be more accessible for the average user.

Digital model railway control systems provide the ability to independently control all operating aspects of a model railway using minimal wiring. In some cases the rails themselves can be the only wiring required, while other systems are completely wireless. In the absence of wiring, control is achieved by sending a digital signal as well as power down the rails or wirelessly through Wi-Fi or Bluetooth. These digital signals can control all aspects of the model trains and accessories, including signals, turnouts, lighting, level crossings, cranes, turntables, etc.

Constant power is supplied to the track and digital signals are sent which require electronic decoders to be fitted to locomotives and other devices to interpret the commands.

== Components ==
=== Controllers ===
Controllers manage operation of locomotives with buttons for all features of a locomotive, from speed and direction to lighting and sound. The style and features of a controller differ between providers and range in size and design. Some controllers feature screens that display information, while others have dials or joysticks.

=== Central Unit ===
A digital system usually requires a central unit to generate digital address and command signals, these are known as command stations. Many command stations also incorporate one or more locomotive controllers and a booster unit to generate the power necessary to run locomotives. Central units also have connections for additional controllers and accessory switch boxes, as well as connections for computer control and interfaces with other digital controllers.

=== Boosters ===
In most systems, boosters are available to provide additional track power for larger layouts. Boosters are connected to the central unit by special cables that relay the digital commands.

=== Decoders ===
Basic locomotive decoders provide control of speed and direction while supplemental function decoders control headlights, ditch lights, or movable non-traction components such as remote-controlled pantographs. Some decoders have control over the locomotive, sound effects, and other layout functions in a single circuit.

Locomotive decoders are small electronic circuits fitted inside locomotives to interpret the digital signals and provide individual control. Although all active decoders receive commands, only the addressed decoder will respond.

Accessory decoders are used to control devices which are fixed in position, such as turnouts, signals, and level crossings. Since the devices do not move, stationary decoders can be mounted under the layout, and therefore can be significantly larger than locomotive decoders. Accessory decoders can receive their signals from an accessory data bus or from the track.

Sound decoders play pre-recorded sound effects which may be synchronised with the locomotive speed, so that as a diesel locomotive starts from standstill, the sound decoder plays sounds of a diesel engine starting up. Sound decoders for steam locomotives can play "chuff" sounds synchronised with the driving wheels.

=== Feedback ===
In some automated systems, the central unit needs to know when trains reach their destination or a certain point on the track. This information is detected by a sensor, such as an infrared device placed between the tracks, a reed switch or a device which senses current draw in an isolated section of track.

Feedback relays an electrical signal from the sensor hardware back to the digital central unit. The central unit can then issue commands appropriate for the specific sensor, such as triggering a signal, or level crossing.

Feedback allows fully automated control of model trains.

=== Computer interface ===
Some central units allow connection to a computer, and a program can then fully automatically control all model train movements and accessories. This facility is particularly useful for display layouts.

Programs have been developed allowing mobile devices to be used as controllers, which also requires the central unit to be connected to a computer.

== Systems ==
=== Digital Command Control ===
Digital Command Control (DCC) systems is a standardized system used to operate locomotives on a model railroad (railway). Equipped with DCC, locomotives on the same electrical section of track can be independently controlled. This works by encoding a digital signal into electrical waves to communicate directly to a specific locomotive therefore controlling the unit without interfering with others on the line. The benefit of DCC is independent control of locomotives, interactive lighting and sound effects, simplicity of wiring, and standardized programming.

While DCC is only one of several alternative systems for digital model train control, it is often misinterpreted to be a generic term for such systems. Several major manufacturers offer DCC systems, including Digitax

=== Digital Command System ===
Digital Command System (DCS) is an electronic system developed by MTH Electric Trains and released in April 2002. DCS controls locomotives equipped with Protosound 2, Protosound 3, or Protosound 3E+ decoders. Protosound 3 locomotives are compatible with both DCS and DCC command systems. Protosound 3E+ locomotives are compatible with DCS and Märklin Digital command systems. All DCS compatible decoders are manufactured by MTH. Factory installed decoders have been offered in H0 scale, two-rail 0 scale, 3-rail 0 gauge, Gauge 1, and three-rail Standard Gauge models. MTH has announced their intention to install DCS compatible decoders in S scale trains beginning in 2013. Separate sale decoder kits have been offered for installation in all of the above noted scales except H0 and S. DCS is predominantly used in three-rail O gauge. Its chief competitors in three-rail O are Lionel's TMCC and Legacy systems.

DCS uses proprietary command codes and transmission technology covered under US patent 6,457,681. The principal differences between DCS and DCC transmission technologies include bidirectional communications and the separation of the command signal from track power. DCS command signals are transmitted at 10.7 MHz using spread spectrum technology.

DCS can operate TMCC equipped models by means of an interface cable that connects the Lionel CB-1 command base to the DCS Track Interface Unit. DCS can coexist on the same track at the same time with either Lionel TMCC or Legacy command systems. Engines with either system can be operated simultaneously as long as both command control units are installed on the track.

=== Direct WiFi Control ===
Direct WiFi Control (DWiC) is an emerging technology for model railway control utilizing the concept of "the internet of things". The availability of miniature web server modules in 2014, led to the formation of a DWiC Working group to explore the possibility of using this technology in model railways. WiFi technology is well established and proven. Although it is considerably more complex than any previous model railway control system it largely transparent to the user with tasks such as bi-directional communication being seamless. DWiC does not use any model rail specific items such as command stations and boosters and so is much lower in cost. This technology is also useful outside the model rail world as a DWiC controller could open a garage door or remotely turn on sprinklers. The web server/controller is similar to a DCC decoder in hardware and cost. The great advantage occurs on the client side where the "throttle" can be any WiFi device with a web browser. DWiC can run on DC, AC or DCC track power or a battery.

The DWiC controller has a web page loaded on board tailored to the particular "item" - loco, accessory etc. The users browser loads the page off the items web server and by pressing buttons directly controls the item via WiFi using HTML, JavaScript, JQuery and C.

=== Software ===
Digital model railway control systems are often connected with an external computer where special software for controlling the train layout is running. This allows more options for operating trains from fully automatic system where the computer is in control of everything in a layout to a computer based control console for controlling signals and points on the layout and leaving the role of the train engineer to a human.

== Providers ==
=== Märklin Digital ===
Märklin Digital was one of the first digital model railway control systems. It consisted of a full system including locomotive decoders (based on a Motorola chip), central control, a computer interface, turnout decoders, digital relays and s88 feedback modules. For controlling 2-rail DC locomotives, like Märklin's Z and 1 gauge rolling stock, a special version of the system was introduced in 1988 developed by Lenz jointly for Märklin and Arnold. Arnold sold the system under name Arnold Digital while Märklin called it "Märklin Digital", this system was the predecessor of DCC-standard. Apart from the locomotive decoders and central units, all the other system components were identical between 3-rail and 2-rail versions.

=== Selectrix ===
Selectrix is an early digital model train command control system developed by German company Döhler & Haas for model railway manufacturer Trix in the early 1980s. Since 1999 Selectrix is an open system supported by several manufacturers and standardized by MOROP. Technically Selectrix differs from competing bus systems by being fully synchronized and bi-directional. The same data bus protocol and data buses are shared by the rolling stock, accessories and feedback information.

=== Trainmaster Command Control ===
Trainmaster Command Control (TMCC) is Lionel's original command control system. It was introduced exclusively in Lionel trains in 1995. Beginning in 2000, Lionel offered licenses to other manufacturers. Licensees that formerly or currently install TMCC decoders in their models include Atlas O, K-Line, Weaver, and Sunset Models 3rd Rail Division. Licensees that formerly or currently offer separate sale decoders include Train America Studios, Digital Dynamics, and Electric RR Co. TMCC decoders have mostly been installed in 3-rail O gauge models, but it has also been offered in 2-rail O scale and S scale.

TMCC utilizes the same command codes as Digital Command Control (DCC). However, unlike DCC, it uses a 455 kHz radio transmission to carry the command codes separate from track power. The locomotive decoders are dependent on AC track power (50 or 60 Hz) to synchronize the command receiver. Thus, TMCC can only operate on AC track power. Because TMCC utilizes the DCC command codes, it is possible to control TMCC with DCC compatible software. MTH Electric Trains included support to interface and control TMCC with its DCS system. Unlike DCC, TMCC-equipped locomotives can run simultaneously with non-TMCC locomotives. Lionel ceased the sale of TMCC command systems in 2010, but continues to introduce models equipped with TMCC decoders. TMCC has been superseded by Lionel's Legacy command system.

=== Legacy Control System ===
Legacy Control System (Legacy) is Lionel's current electronic control system. It was introduced as a successor to Lionel's Trainmaster Command Control (TMCC) in December 2007. Legacy is backwards compatible with all TMCC decoder equipped engines. Models with Legacy sound decoders and/or Odyssey II speed control can be operated with earlier TMCC control systems but also have additional features only accessible with Legacy. The command codes for these additional features differ from the DCC command codes. Lionel has not published or licensed access to the Legacy specific command codes.

=== Hornby Railways Zero 1 ===
Hornby Railways Zero 1 was a forerunner to the modern digital model railway control system, developed by Hornby in the late 1970s. It was based around the TMS1000 four-bit microprocessor. The Zero 1 system enabled the simultaneous control of up to 16 locomotives and up to 99 accessories such as points and signals.

Zero 1 was based on digital, not analogue, technology. This really was the first digital system and as such was a forerunner to the Märklin Digital which appeared in the mid-1980s and the National Model Railroad Association (NMRA) Digital Command Control (DCC) system, which appeared around 1990 and was standardized internationally in the mid-1990s.

Though an important milestone, Zero 1 was not widely successful. Both the controller units and the decoder modules required for the locomotives and accessories were expensive, but with a clean track and well-serviced locos the system worked as advertised.

Prices of Zero 1 articles according to the Hornby Railways price list from 1980

- R.950 Master Controller: 46.35 £
- R.951 Slave Controller: 13.35 £
- R.952 Hand Slave Controller (NEW) Autumn: 13.35 £
- R.955 Loco Operating Module: 7.15 £
- R.956 Accessory Operating Module (NEW) Summer: TBA

For comparison:

- R.842 LMS Class 5 4-6-0: 23.15 £
- R.474 LMS Composite Coach: 4.35 £

The system was mains frequency dependent, so a 50 Hz and 60 Hz versions were available (50 Hz in the UK, 60 Hz in the US and Canada). The Zero 1 system supplied the track with a 18 V sinusoidal alternating current at the local mains frequency with a 32-bit control word replacing every third cycle.

The decoder module in the locomotive would switch either the positive or the negative half-cycle of the square wave to the motor according to the desired direction of travel. During the transmission of the control word, it would remain switched off. Speed control was achieved by pulse-width modulation, varying the width of the portion of the half-cycle, which was switched in 14 steps.

This system allowed for straightforward implementation with the semiconductor technology of the time, but had the disadvantage that the power supplied to the motor was highly discontinuous - as can be seen from the description above, it took the form of square pulses of a maximum width of 10 ms, recurring at intervals which alternated between 20 ms and 40 ms (for a 50 Hz mains supply). This caused the motor to be extremely noisy and rough. Fine control of a locomotive at low speed was also difficult, partly due to the rough running, partly due to the inherent coarseness of a 14-step speed scale, and partly because there was a significant delay between operator input to the controller and response from the locomotive.

Locomotives equipped with a Zero 1 decoder according to Hornby's instructions could not be used on conventional direct current systems, making it difficult to run one's locomotives on friends' layouts or club layouts. This was a common issue with command control systems in that time period. Locomotives with no decoder could not be used on a Zero 1 layout either.

It was possible to include a miniature DPDT switch in the installation to enable the Zero 1 decoder to be switched out for use on a conventional system.

Control of points and other accessories was available in a very simple manner. For solenoid-operated accessories (e.g. points, mechanical signals) or accessories involving lights (e.g. colour light signals), track-powered accessory decoder modules, each providing four outputs, were available. Each output could be configured either for burst operation or continuous output, for use with solenoids or lights respectively. Accessories were switched by entering a numeric code on the controller. Up to 99 accessories could be controlled.

Accessories based around motors rather than solenoids or lights, such as turntables, could be fitted with a locomotive module and controlled in the same manner as a locomotive.

Zero 1 had 3 'phased' introductions:

Phase 1 = Master controlle unit, slave control unit, hand held slave controller and locomotive module (Locomotives)
Phase 2 = Accessory modules (Points, Signals etc.)
Phase 3 = Micromimic display and micromimic display panel (Allowed for LED'S to represent status of points and signals on a display)

The master control unit last appeared in the catalog in 1985. The system is very reliable, the basic 1980s keyboard design being the main problem on older badly stored master control units.

Loco modules were available in two types. The pre-1981 types were based on a single triac but the square-wave supply and the presence of spikes from the motor and from poor contacts rendered the dV/dt rating of the triac marginal and these units would sometimes self-trigger on the wrong polarity half-cycle, resulting in damage both to the unit itself and to the locomotive motor. The later type, made by H&M, used two SCRs, one for "forward" and one for "reverse", to avoid this problem. The system is still used today by many modellers.

==== Hammant & Morgan digital train control system ====
The Hammant & Morgan (H&M) digital train control system is totally compatible with the Zero 1, the master controller,"HM5000 Advanced Power Transmitter" boasted two sliders, direction LEDs, a power LED bar graph, timer clocks, digital display of locos under control, readout of accessories controlled, and ability to attach two "Hi-Tec Speed Transmitter" slave controllers HM5500.

=== Airfix Railway System Multiple Train Control ===
Airfix Railway System Multiple Train Control (MTC) was an analog system introduced in 1979 and used 20 V sinusoidal alternating current on the track with a superimposed control signal. It can control up to 16 locomotives, which a maximum of 4 at a time be controlled simultaneously.

It was only produced for about 18 months when Airfix went into receivership and the concept was dropped.

=== DYNATROL ===
DYNATROL is a 15-channel command control system from Power Systems Inc. The track voltage is 13.5 volts d.c. It was introduced late 1970s.

=== Digitrack 1600 ===
Digitrack 1600 is one of the first generation digital model railway control system developed and marketed by Chuck Balmer and Dick Robbins in 1972. CTC-16 is a second-generation design based on the Digitrack 1600, a commercial system marketed from 1972 to 1976. The CTC-16 digital train control system is totally compatible with the Digitrack 1600.

Digitrack 1600 was analog in nature, with pulses riding on a constant DC track voltage. The width and timing of the pulse determined speed and direction.

=== Rail-Command 816 ===
Introduced in the late 1970s, the RAIL-COMMAND 816 is an eight-channel digital signal system using a constant 12 VDC track voltage.

=== CTC-16 ===
CTC-16 system offered simultaneous control of up to 16 locomotives. A series of 16 variable width pulses is sent out to the track 125 times each second. A receiver mounted in each locomotive is programmed to respond to only one of the 16 pulses. The voltage and polarity applied to the motor depend on the width/timing of the pulse corresponding to that particular receiver. The receiver determines the speed and direction information from that specific pulse. The receiver is essentially a transistor throttle built right into the locomotive. The command station is not expandable beyond 16 channels.

CTC-16 was completely compatible with the Digitrack 1600 receivers, as it was an improved and cost reduced version of the Digitrack 1600. It was presented as a 'build it yourself' project, commercial versions would appear as well. At the time, the project was estimated to cost US$200 for the parts.

=== PROTRAC ===
PROTRACR/C system 9000 offers 8-channel command control. It was introduced in the late 1970s.

=== SALOTA 5300 ===
SALOTA 5300 offers 5-channel command control with a 16-18 VDC constant track voltage. It was introduced in the late 1970s.

=== PMP-112 ===
PMP-112 system offered simultaneous control of up to 112 locomotives. It was based CTC-16.

=== RFPT ===
RFPT offers 9-channel command control system using high-frequency control signals and a 12 VAC constant track voltage.

=== KATO Digital ===
Introduced in the late 1980s, KATO Digital is KATO's electronic control system for H0 scale model trains that is conceptually similar to Digital Command Control (DCC).

=== Railroad Automation ===
Railroad Automation is a Windows command and control application strictly for the LocoNet network. It has many advanced features such as: slot inspector, packet traffic inspector, LocoIO programmer, DCC decoder programmer, multiple throttle control, editable vector-based switchboard display, supports tracks, turnouts, blocks, routes, sensors, signals, accessories, event binding and scripting, sequence recording, speech recognition control, remote control over TCP, and more. The application is also compartmentalised into several API layers which makes it easy for third party developers to build derivate works on its foundation.

=== Hornby RailMaster ===
Introduced in late 2010, the RailMaster is a model railway control software package by Hornby. The software connects to the Hornby Elite DCC controller or the later eLink controller, which is an interface between the laptop or PC which runs RailMaster and the layout and allows for the controls of trains, points, signals, turntables and uncouplers from a single screen. Although usable with a normal mouse, it has been optimised for touch-screen PCs where you just touch a point, a signal or slide a locomotive throttle.

The eLink unit comes with RailMaster as one package and the latter is regularly, and automatically, updated from Hornby itself.

=== Rocrail ===
Rocrail is previously open source, now proprietary software that can control a model train layout from one or more computers. Users can run trains directly from their computer or have it run the trains automatically. Some of the trains can be set to run automatically allowing manual control for others.

=== JMRI ===
JMRI is an open source project that can control a model layout including accessories from a computer.

=== TrainController ===
TrainController by Freiwald, also known as Railroad & Co is a high-end proprietary software package which comes in three versions of increasing functionality, Bronze, Silver and Gold.
