= Tillig =

German model railway company

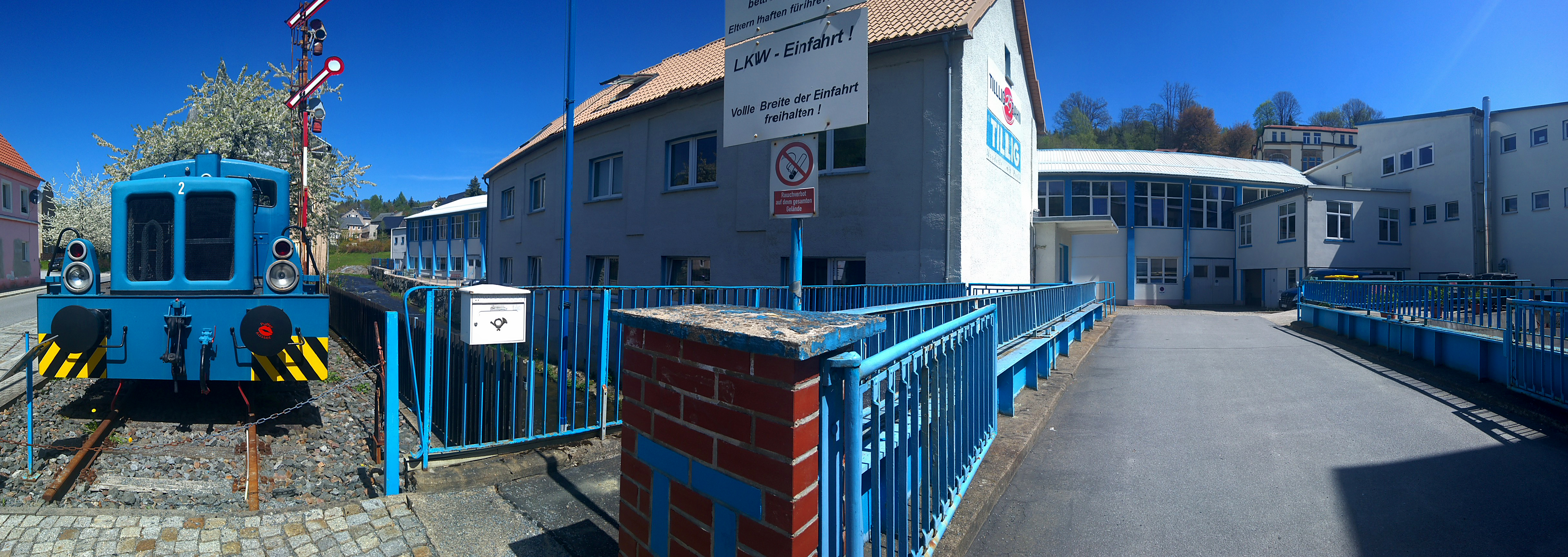
TILLIG Modellbahnen GmbH & Co. KG - Sebnitz

The Tillig TT Bahn Logo

Tillig (TILLIG Modellbahnen GmbH & Co. KG) is a German model railroad manufacturing company based in Sebnitz, Saxony. Tillig is the largest manufacturer of TT scale model railroad products in the world. Previously known as Zeuke (founded in 1949 by Werner Zeuke together with Helmut Wegwerth) and then as VEB Berliner TT-Bahnen (after the company was nationalized in 1972), the company was renamed Tillig in 1993 when, in bankruptcy, the company was purchased by Jurgen Tillig.

Tillig produce models in TT, H0 and H0e, as well as a range of track in TT, H0, H0m and H0e. As the world leader in TT scale manufacturing, Tillig produces both standard TT scale model railroad track and an integrated roadbed track using known as Bedding Track. Tilling's Bedding Track uses Kato's Unijoiner system.

Tillig also distributes various other manufacturers products, such as Luna H0 and H0m tram track, Sachsenmodelle, and Czech outline models of CS Train.

Tillig also makes dual gauge track.
