= NZ120 =

Model railway scale

NZ120 is a New Zealand variation of the TT scale for model railways using a 1:120 scale with a gauge of 9 mm (the same as N scale) between the rails, to represent New Zealand's 1,067 mm (3 ft 6 in) gauge track.

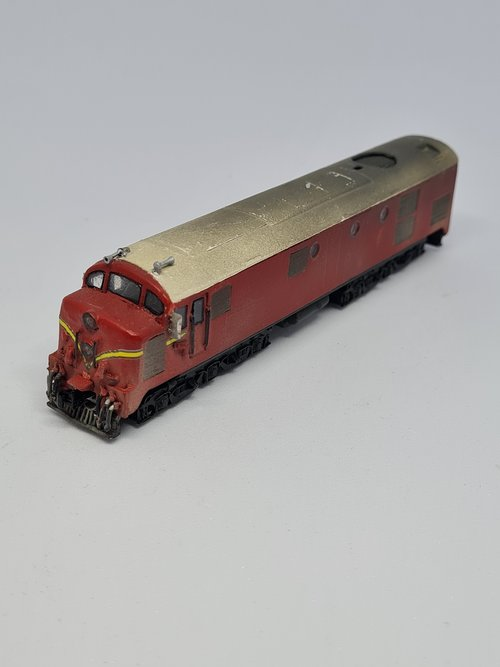
An NZ120 DG class locomotive.

== History ==
The first use of NZ120 as a scale and gauge combination was in the New Zealand Model Railway Journal in 1973.

== See also ==
- New Zealand Model Railway Guild
