= New Zealand Model Railway Guild =

Organisation in New Zealand

The New Zealand Model Railway Guild is an Incorporated society in New Zealand that exists to provide "...a link between model railway enthusiasts with a focus on modelling the New Zealand prototype."

== History ==
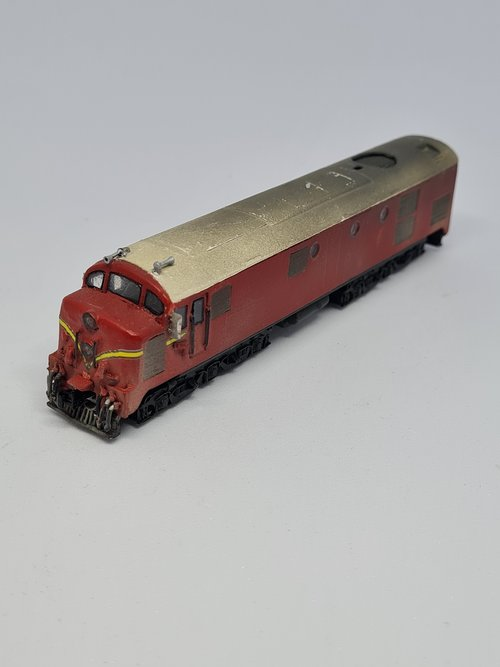
An NZ120 scale DG class locomotive.

The Guild began as the model railway section of the New Zealand Railway and Locomotive Society in 1947. Originally known as the New Zealand Model Railway Association, it was renamed as the guild and incorporated as a separate incorporated society on 28 July 1967.

== Publications ==
Until 2025, the Guild published the New Zealand Model Railway Journal (ISSN 0028-8470). The entire archive of the journal is now online. The organisation now publishes the Journal Online, with new posts made weekly.

== Interest Groups ==
Several special interest groups exist within the guild, usually specific to model railway scales, such as the NZ120 group, and the 9mm scale group. The most popular scale for modeling New Zealand's railways is Sn3.5.

== See also ==
- New Zealand Railway and Locomotive Society
