= Train Master =

Train Master or Trainmaster may refer to:

- FM H-24-66, or Train Master, a diesel-electric railroad locomotive in the 1950s
- Trainmaster (occupation), an employee who supervises train operations
- Trainmaster Command Control, an electronic control system for model trains
