= T-Trak =

Model railroad system

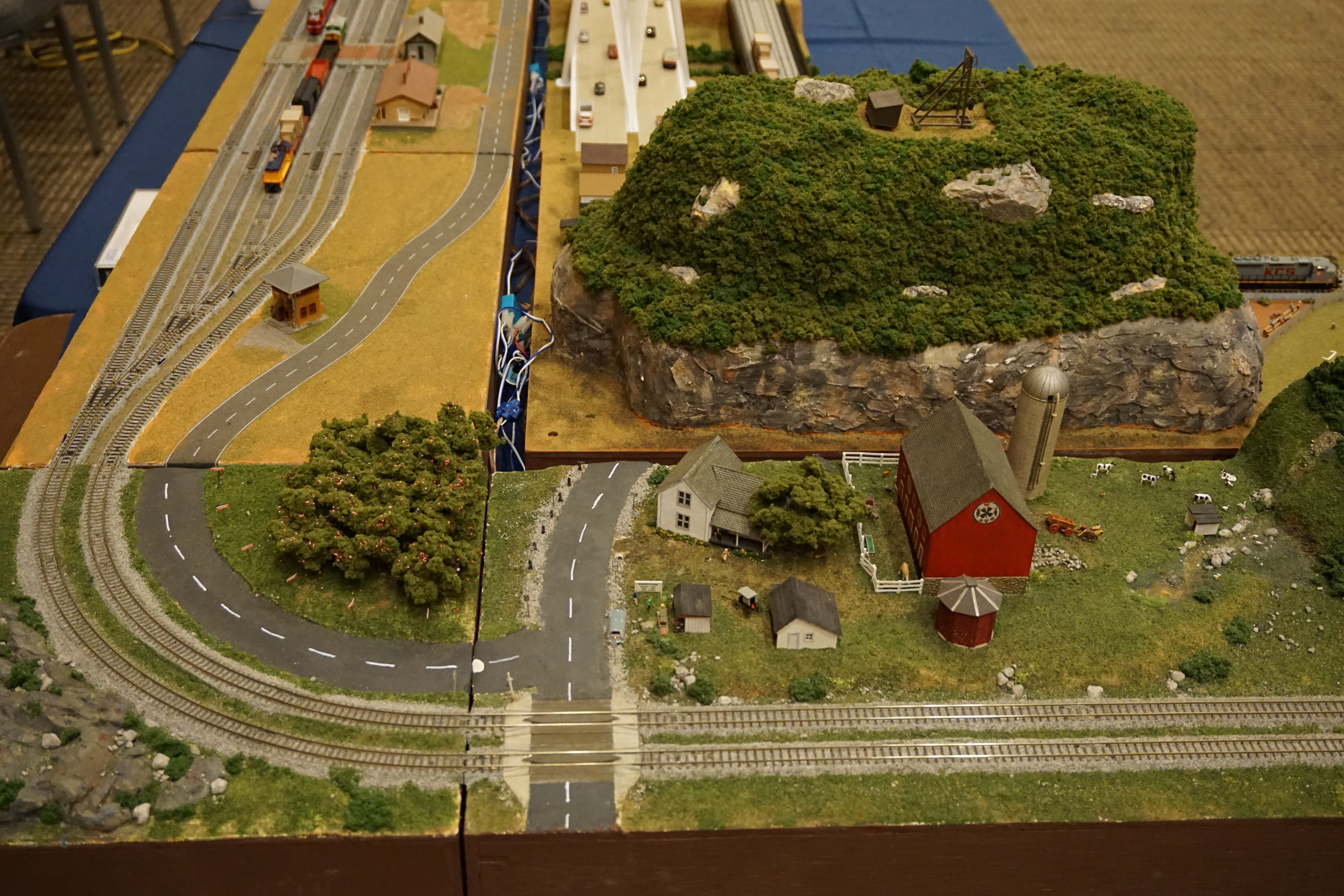
N gauge T-TRAK modules of the North Texas T-TRAK Modular Railroad Club at the 2015 Cotton Belt Regional Railroad Symposium in Commerce, Texas

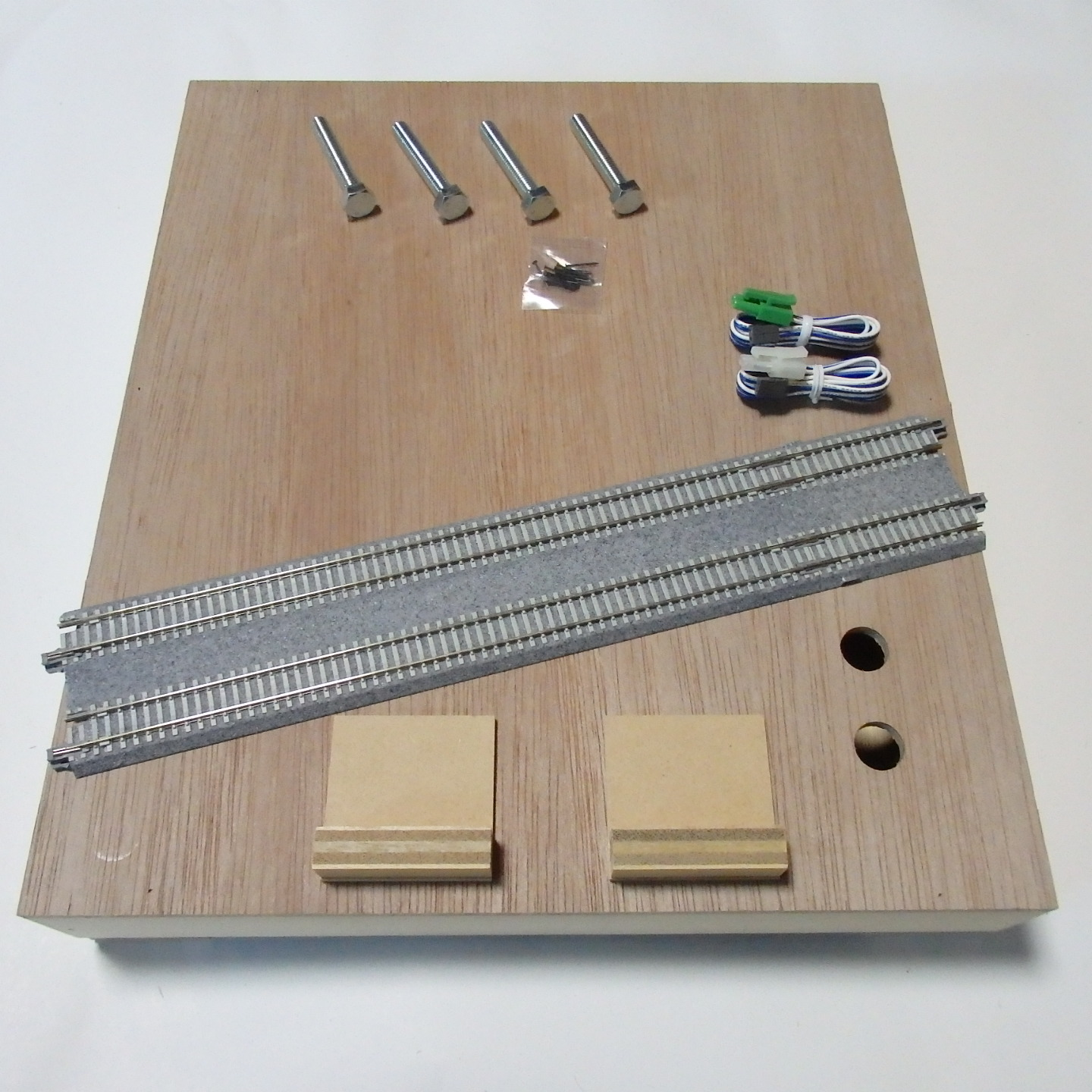
A single-size T-TRAK module kit sold by KATO, JAPAN. This kit is available at Hobby Center KATO in Tokyo and Kyoto and other model stores in Japan.

T-TRAK (all letters capitalized) is a modular model railroad system based on standards for module size, track placement, track interface, and electrical connections. The standards allow for a wide range of flexibility in design yet still maintain interoperability with all modules built per the standards. The popularity of T-TRAK is worldwide allowing for modules from all over the world to connect together.

T-TRAK modules are dioramas with sectional track, specifically Kato Unitrack, that snap together to create layouts from a simple circle to large complex layouts. The modules are designed to fit on tables. Layouts are easy to assemble and disassemble. The convenient size of the modules make them easy to store on a shelf or in totes when not in use, or to transport.

== History of T-TRAK ==
=== Beginning ===
In the July 2000 edition of the NTRAK Newsletter there appeared a notice of the Japan Association of Model Railroaders (JAM) International Model Railroad Convention to be held in Tokyo starting Sunday, August 13, 2000. Jim FitzGerald was asked to speak at the convention, and he took his wife, Lee Monaco-FitzGerald with him. What took place at this convention was the development of a concept that would become T-TRAK. The September issue of the NTRAK Newsletter included a detailed write-up of the JAM convention where the Hino N Club's layout was discussed. This club's layout featured modules that sit atop tables on bases that are about 4 inches (100 mm) high. The Hino N Club layout included a 2-track mainline with the track identified as Kato Unitrack. The track on these modules is apparently set back from the end of the modules by about 1/4 inch (6.4 mm) and expansion tracks are used to connect the modules to each other. A photo of a corner module shows the dimensions of these modules to be closer to that of NTRAK with wider sweeping corners and examples showing some North American prototype themes.

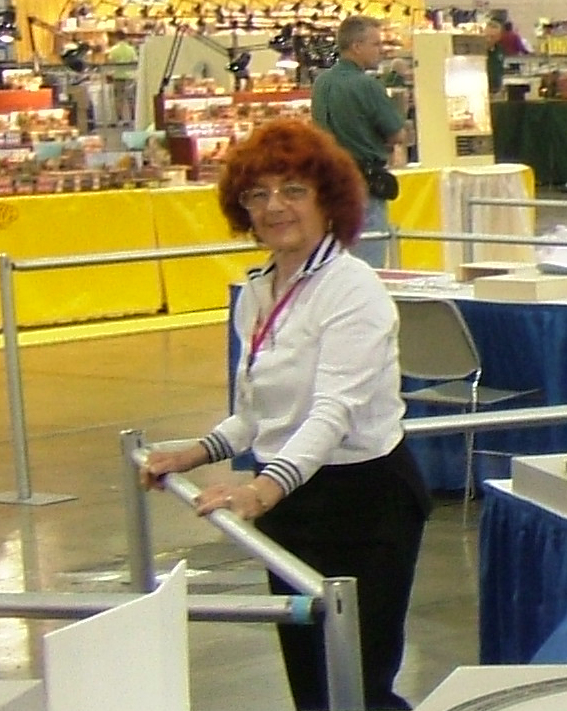
Lee Monaco-FitzGerald at NMRA Train Show in Philadelphia 2006

In March 2001, Lee wrote an article in the NTRAK Newsletter expressing concern about getting new people into the model railroading hobby. She pointed out that we, as modelers, needed to reach out to folks who come to our shows and talk to them about their interest in the hobby. She encourages us to look for ways to include everyone in the hobby. She discussed some of her whimsical efforts including her "Dimensional Murals" that hang to the floor on the front of her NTRAK modules as well as her table-top layouts like Castle TRAKula.

In July 2001, Lee published some photos of the detailed work by some Japanese modelers to draw interest in the second JAM convention that was held in August 2001. She discussed how the Japanese modelers were inclined to build dioramas to showcase highly detailed building models by mounting the buildings on boards with scenery around them. Following the second JAM convention, the September 2001 NTRAK Newsletter introduced T-TRAK modules for the first time in an article by Lee. The introduction stated that the T-TRAK modules were based on a Tram Module design by RM Models of Japan. Lee said that she and Jim had been shown the module concept at a meeting in Japan the previous summer in August 2000. The concept seemed to pull together many of the topics that she had been writing about in her Newsletter articles: tabletop modules, Kato Unitrack, and most importantly, getting new modelers involved in the hobby. T-TRAK seemed to be the perfect way to bring all these ideas together.

=== First T-TRAK modules ===
Lee built the first three T-TRAK modules and displayed them sitting atop an NTRAK module at the Gateway 2001 National Convention and National Train Show in St. Louis, Missouri in July 2001. The initial modules were built using art boards that Jim and Lee acquired in Japan. The boards are the size of A4 paper (the standard paper size in Japan) and are about an inch thick with end plates, providing the structure needed to hold up the track and scenery. In the article, Lee indicated that she and Jim were looking for a US supplier for the art boards and would provide additional information as it was available.

The November 2001 NTRAK Newsletter ran an article on Lee taking her first three T-TRAK modules over to Japan for the August 2001 JAM convention; there were two T-TRAK-compatible layouts in which her modules were included. That issue of the NTRAK Newsletter included an article on how to build a T-TRAK straight and corner module. In the January 2002 NTRAK Newsletter, Lee provided an update on T-TRAK including photos of her Center City set of three singles that featured a siding and dense urban modeling.

=== Concept starts to germinate ===
By March 2002, the NTRAK Newsletter published a notice that T-TRAK module kits were available from Richard Hein in Glen Arbor, Michigan. The black and white version of the original T-TRAK logo made its first appearance in the March issue while the May issue, was the inauguration of a regular T-TRAK feature in the NTRAK Newsletter. The May issue featured pictures of Paul Musselman's early modules including the first photos of a double module. Paul was a very early T-TRAK adopter and is the author and maintainer of The Unofficial T-TRAK Handbook.

In July 2002 the T-TRAK website, www.t-trak.org was introduced and in September an Australian website came online. A Yahoo Forum was created for T-TRAK in October 2002 and was instrumental in the growth and spread of T-TRAK KATO it provided a place for modelers from across the globe to share their ideas and work. In January 2003, a new Shapemaster pre-molded module kit was released. These kits, which were featured in a layout including Dave Halloran's Wabash Crossing shown below in the July 2003 NTRAK Newsletter, were available in many different shapes and sizes and allowed modelers to build T-TRAK modules without having to do any carpentry. These module kits were very popular and helped launch T-TRAK for modelers who were unable or unwilling to do woodworking tasks involved.

The NTRAK organization started selling modules in May, 2004. Today, there are five manufacturers that provide module kits and they are listed in the reference section.

The January 2003 NTRAK Newsletter featured the introduction of the original T-TRAK logo in color as well as an overview of the 3rd Annual JAM convention in Japan where interest in T-TRAK-compatible modules continued to grow. The May issue featured the modules built by Cub Scout Pack 306 which highlighted the aim to get modelers of all ages involved in model railroading.

== T-TRAK standards ==
=== Basic requirements ===
This section focuses on T-TRAK standards, one of a number of N scale modular standards as outlined in the N Scale Module Standards document.

Basic T-TRAK module requirements are very simple; there are few "formal" specifications for a T-TRAK module. Since almost all modules are built to the N specifications, so reference to T-TRAK is understood to be N scale. Other scales include the scale reference, such as T-TRAK-Z. Let us start with some definitions. The "length or width" of the module is the axis parallel to the track. The terms length and width are used interchangeably in T-TRAK. The "depth" of the module is the dimension perpendicular to the track and is the distance from the front (nearest the track) of the module to the back. The "height" of the module is measured from the bottom of the module to the base of the track.

The first item in the list of formal T-TRAK specifications is that the track at the module edges must be Kato Unitrack. Modules in a layout are not clamped or bolted together in any fashion. The only thing that holds the modules together in a layout are the Kato uni-joiners. It is acceptable to use track from other manufacturers between the Kato Unitrack interfaces, however, most T-TRAK builders use Kato Unitrack exclusively on their T-TRAK modules. Builders must ensure the trackwork on their modules will not cause issues while running trains. The first time T-TRAK builder is advised to use Kato Unitrack exclusively on their first few modules.

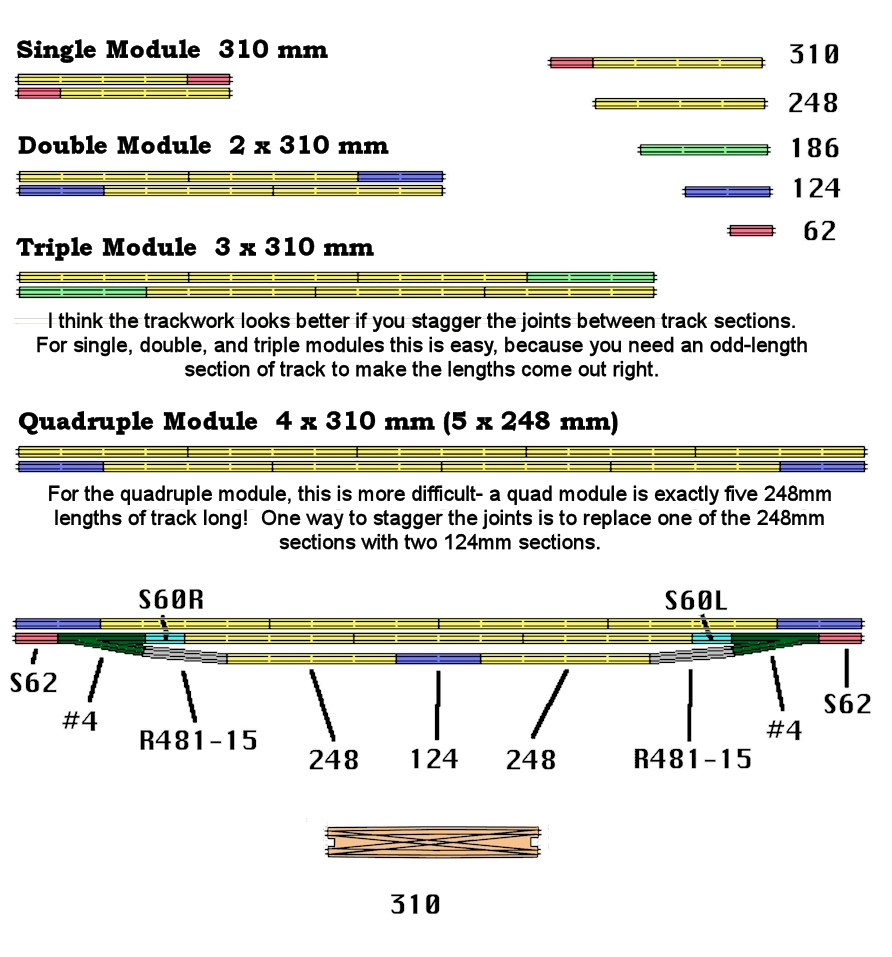
Track section lengths for modules of various lengths

The use of Kato track created an early "informal" standard for the length of track on a module to be 310 mm (which is 12 1/4 in). A module of this size is typically referred to as a "single". A module with 620 mm of track is referred to as a "double". Those with 930 mm of track (3 × 310 mm) are known as "triples" and, there are "quads" (4 × 310 mm) and even longer T-TRAK modules for special situations. It is advisable that all track on straight modules be built as a multiple of 310 mm units of track for reasons of compatibility. The reason this is advised is because most T-TRAK layouts consist of a double row of modules on a table and a non-standard length module on one side will not permit the loop to be closed. In order for a non-standard length module to be used, another module of equal length must be built and used on the other side of the table, or the layout must be constructed as a single row of modules with return loops on each end. While a non-standard length T-TRAK module can be constructed, the builder should recognize that doing so may limit the usability of that module in a multi-person, multi-club layout.

Kato produces straight track in increments of 62 mm. (i.e. 62 mm, 124 mm, 186 mm, 248 mm and the double crossover is 310 mm) and straight track is packaged four pieces to the package so for most typical track combinations (e.g. 124 + 186; 248 + 62) two packages of track are enough for two single modules or one double module. There are other combinations that create 310 mm of track but they will require more pieces. Since Kato track is measured in metric units it is easiest to build modules using metric measurements.

There are multiple ways to build a T-TRAK module but the most common is the box method. This is basically a lidless, inverted box. For a module of single length (i.e. 310 mm of track), the box should be no more than 308 mm (12 1/8 in) wide. This gap provides for 1 mm of track overhang on each side of the module. This 1 mm overhang (or more) is part of the formal T-TRAK standards. It was implemented to allow flexibility with connecting to other modules that may not be built squarely, or for those that warped or flexed. The formal standard height of the module is 70 mm (2 3/4 in) and is adjustable to a height of 100 mm (3.9 in) by utilizing leveling bolts. The height measurement is from a flat surface to the base of the Kato track. There is no formal specification for the depth of a module. The original T-TRAK modules and subsequent kits from Lee Monaco-Fitzgerald were 210 mm (8 1/4 in) deep. However, the depth for modules varied by builder depending on the desire for scenery space and available building materials.

The general practice building T-TRAK modules is that they should be no deeper than 355 mm (14.0 in). In a typical double row, oval layout this permits a small gap between the backs of modules. Since this is an informal maximum there is some flexibility with this dimension. For example, a smaller module could be built and placed opposite a deeper module, however, this arrangement could limit the use of those modules in some layouts.

The recommended offset from the front fascia to the edge of the ballast (not track center) of the front track, or outer line, is 38 mm (1 1/2 in). The center to center spacing for the second, or inner line can either be 25 mm or 33 mm. The 25 mm spacing was the original specification for T-TRAK but is rarely used due to clearance issues on corners with longer rolling stock. Track spacing of 33 mm is the most common spacing for existing modules and is identical to Kato's double track pieces (e.g. concrete tie track, double crossover, etc.). Regardless of the track spacing, it is imperative that both front and back tracks are even and square with respect to each other and the box upon which they are affixed. It is a best practice to use Kato's double track sections as alignment tools when affixing track to a module.

=== Electrical standards ===
One of the most discussed T-TRAK standards is the wiring standard. The wiring specification is a formal standard. For modules wired for track power and using standard Kato connectors, the specification is that the rails, beginning with the front rail on the front track, be wired in a blue, white, white, blue order. This is also known as "blue to the outside". At the time, this was considered to be a benefit because it permitted running a train on each loop (inner and outer) in opposite directions with one DC throttle. Regardless of the historical reasoning, the standard has been in place since the beginning and has not changed. The proper way to reverse the polarity for the inner line is to do so at the power pack and not at the module. All modules that feature a power drop should be wired to the specification and have the Kato power connectors. It is a best practice to have a power drop every six to eight single modules (approximately every 2 meters, or 6–8 feet) around a layout. The Kato wiring accessories (e.g. Unitrack DC extension cord, Unitrack three-way extension cord) are sufficient to power layouts that are three tables in length. For very large layouts, there is an updated standard of using a wiring bus similar to what was developed by the T-TRAK Division of the North Virginia NTRAK club. The details are covered in the formal T-TRAK standards document.
