= Levon Kemalyan =

Levon John Kemalyan (24 February 1907 Fresno, California – 2 November 1976 Fresno, California) was a model railroading entrepreneur. He founded Kemtron Corporation, a manufacturer of model railway cars, locomotives, parts (especially for scratchbuilders), and accessories. In 1960 it was the world's largest maker of scale railroad kits, producing one million parts a year and selling them worldwide to enthusiasts as far away as India and Australia.

== Companies owned ==
Kemalyan had ownership stakes in various companies; Fresno Photo-Engraving Company, U.S. Hobbies, Inc., and Kemtron Corporation.

Fresno Photo-Engraving Company was founded in 1903 by A. F. Kemalyan. Levon purchased the company with his brother-in-law in 1929. In 1935, he took over the photo-engraving company himself. Levon sold the firm December 26, 1962, to his brothers-in-law, Thomas N. Vartanian and Jerry Mootafian.

Kemtron Corporation was founded and owned by Kemalyan. :Kemalyan started Kemtron in Fresno in the early '50s (possibly even 1948 or 1949), and he provided layout space for the Fresno Model Railroad club in the early '50s. In 1960, the Kemtron plant was 11,000 square feet (1,000 m^{2}) with 15 employees. One of Kemtron's product lines, photo engraved car kits, particularly the flats, often used zinc (or a very high zinc content brass) sheet, as opposed to brass. The 'blue' coating, was the 'photo resist' that was not cleaned off. Kemtron was initially a sideline of Fresno Photo Engraving, which explains why common photo engraving materials were often used. In the mid-1960s Kemtron also produced a line of slot cars and accessories.

Lawrence S. Kazoyan (b. November 7, 1931 – d. April 15, 2000, Palm Beach), a retired aerospace engineer, acquired Kemtron in 1970, and moved it from Fresno to Los Angeles. T. Fredrick Hill and Wayne Lyndon, owners of The Original Whistle Stop Inc., acquired Kemtron in 1978 and moved it to Sacramento. The Precision Scale Company, Inc. acquired Kemtron as a merger in 1986. Former Kemtron employee John Anderson later went on to found Associated Brass Products, Inc., maker of the Cal-Scale line.

== Honors ==
- 1999 Model Railroad Industry Association Hall of Fame inductee
- 2001 O scale Hall of Fame inductee

== Family ==
Kemalyan was born and raised in Fresno, California. He also died in Fresno. His parents, Coshocir and Yonepseper A. Coshocir (née Chorbaji) were born in Armenia. Coshocir was an engraver. Levin had three sisters, Flora (Flora Maroot; 1898–1978), Alice (Alice Nevart Thomas; 1904–1990), and Naomi (born 1910). On March 6, 1941, Levin married Roselle Arax Bezazian (1909–2008) in Cook County, Illinois, a pianist who graduated from Oberlin Conservatory of Music. 64 years ago (in 1961), Roselle Kemalyan was elected president of the Fresno Music Club. The club, this year (2025), is in its 120th season. Levon and Roselle had two daughters: Constance R. ("Connie") (married to Gerald L. Wright) and Katharine ("Kathy") (married to Thomas Starbird).

== See also ==
- G scale
- 00 scale
- HO scale
- HOn3 scale
- TT scale
- N scale
- Z scale
