= Kato Precision Railroad Models =

Japanese manufacturer

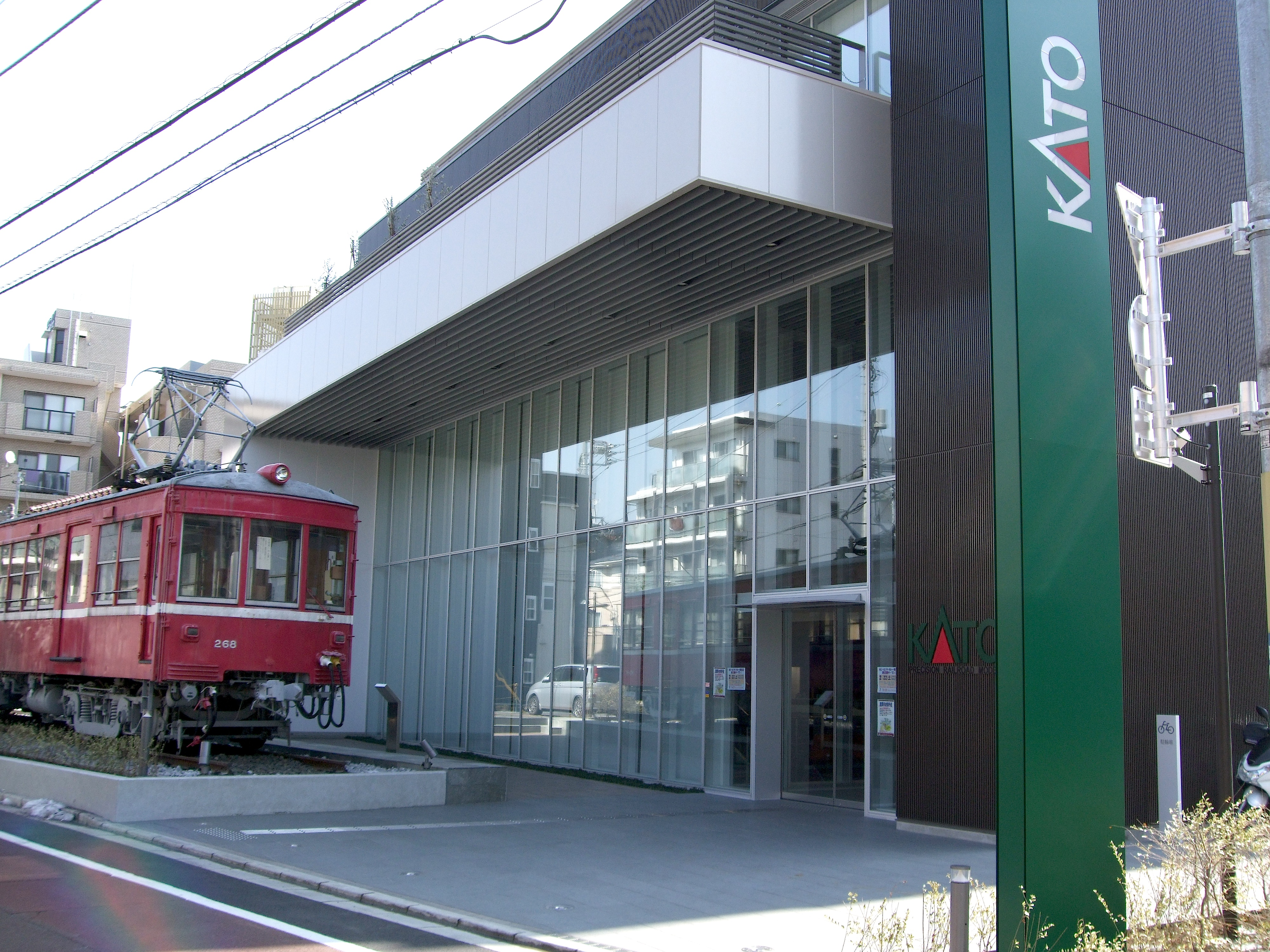
- Kato Hobby Center in Tokyo
- Founded: 1957 (69 years ago)
- Founder: Yuji Kato
- Headquarters: Tokyo, Japan
- Products: Model trains
- Website: katomodels.com

Kato Precision Railroad Models (関水金属株式会社, Sekisui Kinzoku Kabushikigaisha) is a Japanese manufacturer of model railroad equipment in N and HO scales. Founded in 1957, the Tokyo-based company manufactures models based on Japanese prototypes (such as the Shinkansen bullet train and Cape gauge trains and locomotives) for the Japanese market, North American prototypes for the North American market and European high-speed trains and Rhaetian Railway trains for the European market. Models for the OO9 market of Ffestiniog Railway engines are also made. The design and distribution of models for the North American market are handled by their U.S. subsidiary, Kato USA, founded in 1986 and located in Schaumburg, Illinois.

The Kato (pronounced kah-toe) model railroad companies were founded by Yuji Kato, father of current president Hiroshi Kato, of the parent company Sekisui Kinzoku Co., Ltd.

Yuji Kato, the founder of Sekisui Kinzoku Co., Ltd., died on November 21, 2016.

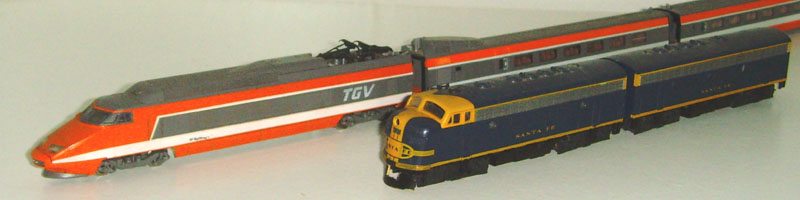
Kato N scale TGV and EMD F7

== Unitrack ==
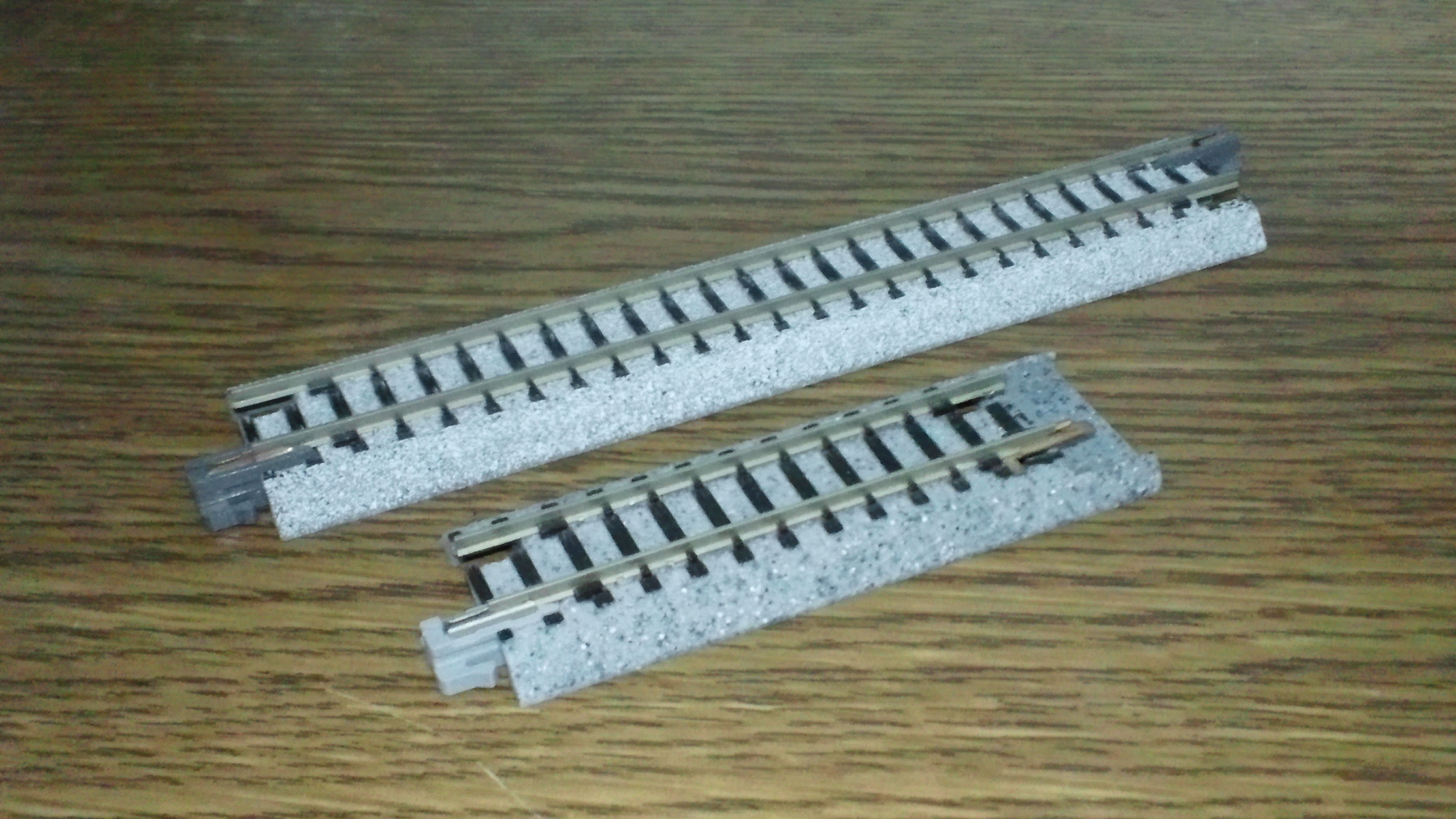
N scale Unitrack

In both N scale and HO scale, Kato also manufactures an integrated roadbed model railroad track brand named Unitrack.

== Locomotive features ==
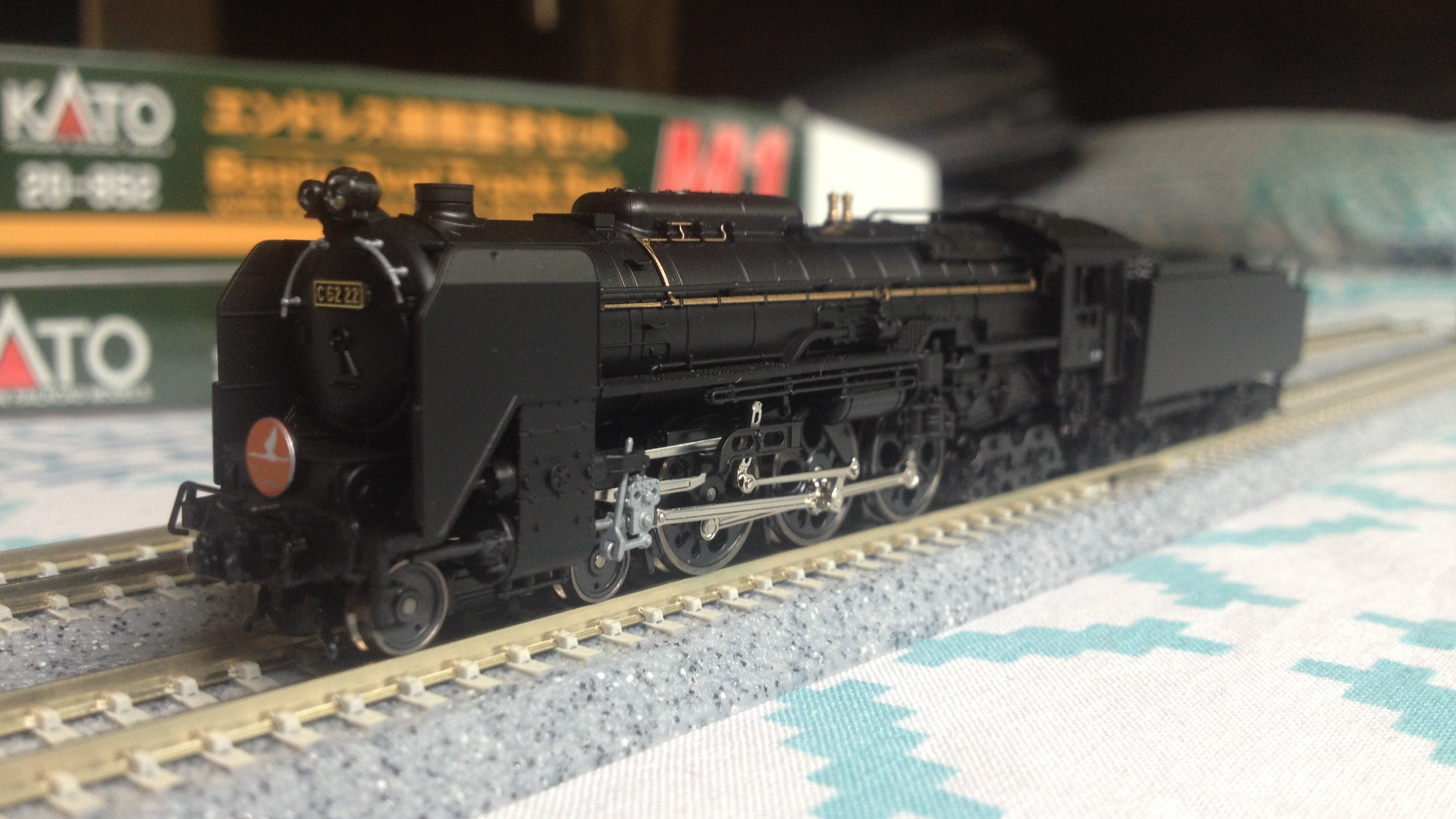
Kato N-scale 4-6-4 C62 steam locomotive

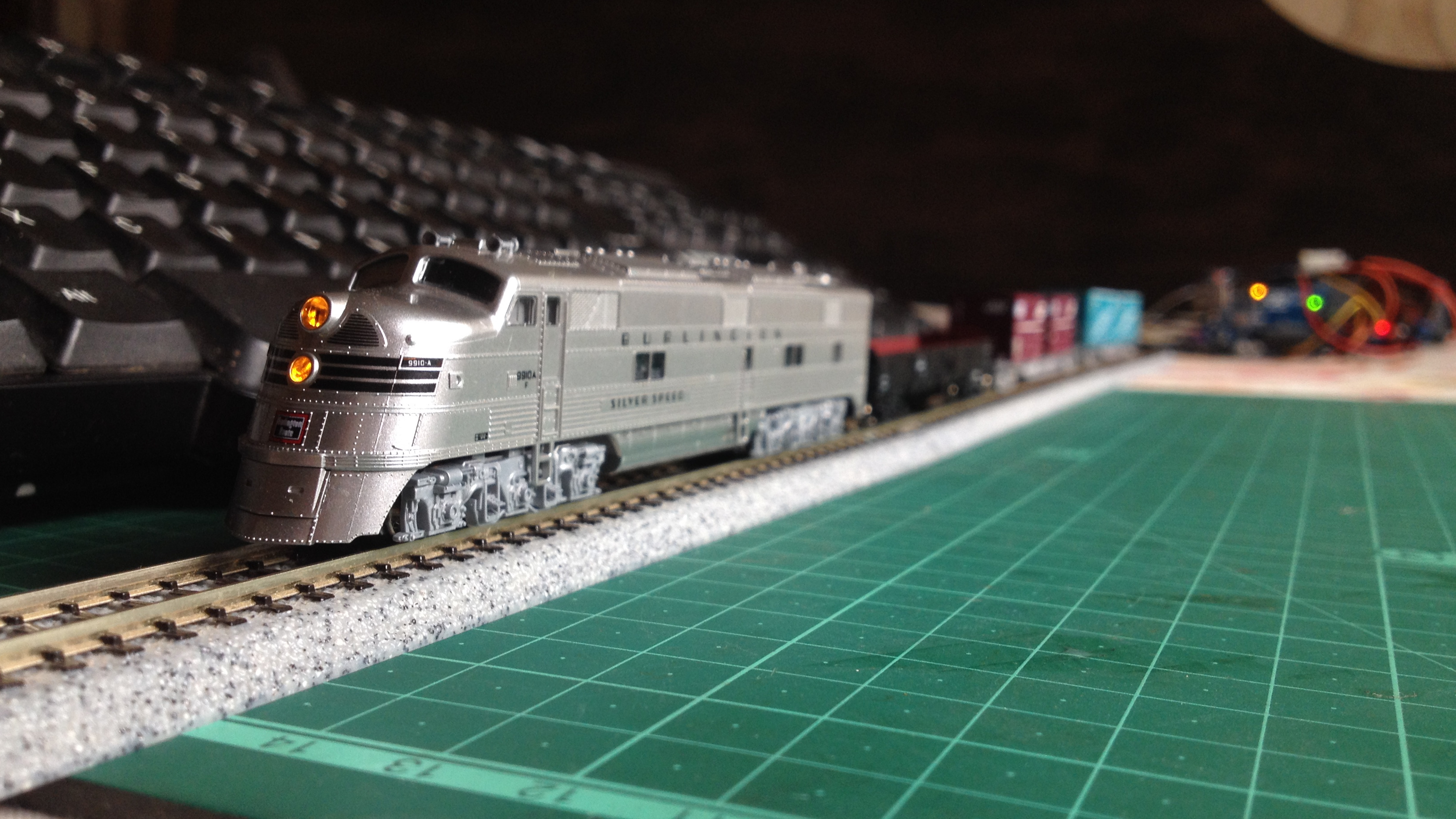
Kato N-scale EMD E5A "Silver Speed" diesel locomotive

Kato N-scale locomotive features include:

- 5-pole motors
- Blackened metal wheels

and on some models:

- Operating ditch lights
- Directional golden white LEDs
- All-wheel electrical pickup

== KATO Digital ==
A multiple train control system named KATO Digital was introduced in the late 1980s for HO scale model trains. Conceptually it is similar to Digital Command Control (DCC). Although an important milestone for Kato, KATO Digital was not very successful; both the controller units and the decoder modules required for the locomotives were expensive, and locomotives equipped with a KATO Digital decoder could not be used on conventional systems, making it difficult to run one's locomotives on friends' layouts or club layouts.

== See also ==
- Tomy, Kato's main competitor in Japan
- T-TRAK, a modular standard using Kato Unitrack
