= Märklin Digital =

Model railway control system

Märklin Digital was among the earlier digital model railway control systems. It was a comprehensive system including locomotive decoders (based on a Motorola chip), central control (Märklin 6020/6021), a computer interface (Märklin 6050), turnout decoders (Märklin 6083), digital relays (Märklin 6084) and feedback modules (Märklin s88/6088). The initial system was presented at the 1979 Nürnberg International Toy Fair, released in Europe in 1985 and the USA in 1986 under the name Digital H0.

== Operation ==
Conventional analog control of model railways works by varying the track voltage and any locomotive on the track will respond by running at a speed roughly proportional to the voltage. For multiple trains, sidings must have a switch to isolate trains standing there and leave the track dead. For multiple controllers, the layout must be divided into sections isolated from each other and each with its own controller and current supply. All accessories such as signals and turnouts require individual switches and cables, making wiring very complex.

With analog systems, fine control of locomotives requires knowledge of the individual characteristics; gradients and curves require constant adjustment and low speed running is both difficult and liable to stalling. Any train lighting will vary in intensity with the voltage and be off when the locomotive is stopped.

Digital control supplies a voltage to the track which is switched many times a second to provide the "bits" of data (0 and 1) necessary for control (such digital system is neither DC nor AC). Every locomotive must be fitted with a decoder circuit which will interpret instructions and individually control the motor. Each decoder has its own address, instructions sent from the controller have a corresponding address so that while every active decoder will receive the instructions only the addressed decoder will respond. Once a locomotive is running it will continue and so even with one controller several trains can be running.

Many locomotives may be on the track and individually controlled. Train lighting will always be at full intensity, even when the locomotive is stopped. Signals and turnouts may also be provided with decoders and controlled digitally. The track consists of 2 electrically grounded rails, and a row of center studs over which the engine's pickup "shoe" glides acquiring the digital-pulsed 16V signal and power. This symmetrical track design solved the problem of loop-back topology (a problem encountered in polarized 2-rail). Conceptually, the entire layout may be controlled from just two wires to the track, but in practice multiple feeds will be required and power to the track is usually separated from power to accessories.

The final step to ideal running was the development of motor regulation or speed control (often misleadingly called "load control"). Locomotive motors are controlled using pulse-width modulation which gives much better regulation than conventional analogue control. Additionally, utilizing the full track power available, decoders can use motor feedback and constant adjustment to maintain steady speed regardless of train load or track gradient. Combined with braking and acceleration delay (artificial inertia) these decoders give smooth and exact speeds with reliable slow speed control.

A number of different digital systems were developed, but Märklin Digital and DCC (Digital Command Control) are the two main systems on the market. The systems are electrically compatible and some controllers can simultaneously control both types of decoder. Märklin offered versions of their original digital system for 2-rail users.

== Märklin Digital ==
Märklin first presented the new digital control system at the Nürnberg Toy Fair in 1979. The Motorola based system was officially introduced in 1985, developed by a relatively unknown electronics contractor with most components built by Märklin. In subsequent years, another contractor, Bernd Lenz, would also work on the system producing locomotive decoders and, later, Märklin's first DC command control offering. This first DC offering was later developed into what is now known as Digital Command Control (DCC).

The new Märklin Digital system offered simultaneous control of up to 80 locomotives and 256 accessories. 14 locomotive speed steps (stop 0 and 1 - 14) were provided and an accessory "Function" that was used for locomotive front and rear headlights or TELEX remote uncoupling.

Electronics of the time were relatively expensive and the system used ternary logic to reduce the number of components and cost of devices. Early decoders cost as much as many model locomotives and the expense of upgrading an existing layout was considerable.

=== Controllers ===
The original 6020 Central Unit provided track power & generated locomotive commands but required a separate 6035 locomotive Control 80 with speed controller, keypad for decoder address, Function / Off buttons, and Start / Stop buttons to switch track power. The red Stop button was provided as an emergency stop to immediately halt all trains. A two digit display showed the selected locomotive address (01 - 80). Solenoid devices, such as turnouts, were controlled by the 6040 Keyboard. Up to ten controllers could be added to the right hand side of the Central Unit, and up to 16 keyboards could be added to the left hand side, with each keyboard controlling 16 accessories (signals, turnouts, lights, etc.) for a total of 256. For large layouts 6016 Boosters and their own power supplies would provide additional power to layout sections with all Boosters linked to the Central Unit by a ribbon cable.

A later accessory was the 6043 Memory, which was used for switching predefined routes each with multiple turnouts & signals. The 6043 could save up to 24 different routes, which each route containing up to 20 individual device commands. The 20th command in one route memory could be used to link to another route button, so there could be a large number of individual commands enacted by pressing one button. In addition, the 6088 s88 Feedback Module could be used in conjunction with the 6043. The s88 would receive input signals from external buttons or magnetic reed switches and then start a command string in the 6043 Memory. So, an approaching train could set up its own route, as an example. Another accessory was the 6050 computer Interface which let the system be computer controlled, allowing for fully automated train control.

=== Decoders ===
The first c80 (6080) decoders did not have motor regulation (speed control) and the 1991 introduction of c90 (6090) decoders with regulation and a 5-pole DC motor brought the system to maturity. Decoders had miniature switches (DIP switches) to set the address and c90 decoders had two potentiometers to adjust braking / acceleration delay ("inertia") and maximum speed, requiring the use of tools to open the model and make any changes to settings.

=== Accessory decoders ===
Signals, turnouts, uncouplers, lights, and other static accessories may also be fitted with decoders which have their own address range for up to 256 switched devices. Depending on the decoder, either continuous power (lighting) or momentary (signal, uncoupler, turnout) is provided. K83 decoders are for solenoid (momentary) accessories and K84 for lighting (continuous) accessories, each one controlling up to 4 devices.

=== Automatic braking ===
Automatic braking allows a locomotive to coast relatively gently up to a stop signal at danger. When fed with negative DC the decoder will slow the locomotive smoothly. Track must be sectioned at least once, the stopping area before the signal, and usually also a transition section to prevent short circuits. An electronic control module is switched when the signal changes to danger and changes the track voltage in the stopping area.

== Märklin Digital (new) ==
In 1993 an enhancement to the original system introduced improvements for locomotive control:

- Additional four switched functions F1 - F4
- Absolute direction control with direction sent as part of speed commands

The changes were entirely compatible with earlier locomotive decoders so any controller was able to control any locomotive decoder type (a few special function decoders developed earlier were incompatible with the revised protocol, 6021 control units could be set to send old protocol only).

Absolute direction control is important for computer controlled layouts so that, after power off, locomotives will restart in the previously controlled direction. Older c90 decoder equipped locomotives will always restart forwards after power off, regardless of the previously controlled direction.

=== Controllers ===
The new 6021 combined control unit & locomotive control with additional function buttons. Miniature switches set the operating mode (old or new protocol) and reduced track voltage for shunting areas.

The new Control 80f allowed additional locomotive controllers to be plugged into the right hand side of a 6021, other modules as before.

=== Decoders ===
1997 c91 (60901) decoders provided additional function outputs F1 - F4, 27 speed steps (stop 0 and 1 - 27), and improved motor regulation. Although the new decoders had 27 speed steps, existing controllers could only send 14 and so the decoders would step up odd steps and down even steps making all 27 steps accessible.

The extra functions allowed for other features such as additional lighting and sound. While the small size of speaker that can be fitted into H0 locomotives limits reproduction, built in sound has become a feature of many models. Adjustments to the new decoders required tools, as before. "Function" was most commonly used for locomotive headlights, F1 & F2 were usually used for other power functions such as smoke units or additional lighting. F3, when available, was commonly used for sound, and F4 usually used to disable artificial inertia for precise control, especially when shunting.

These decoders are now designated "fx" to distinguish them from earlier decoders lacking additional switched functions.

=== Function decoders ===
Function decoders without motor control can also be fitted to carriages providing the 5 switched functions to control train lighting and other additional features. They may also be fitted to locomotives lacking the additional switched functions (i.e. c90 equipped locomotives). Function decoders require their own address from the 80 addresses available for locomotives (the address can be shared with another decoder lacking additional functions). Märklin had offered some special models with additional functions for the original digital system, but separate function decoders only became available with the enhanced system.

== DELTA ==
A simplified system intended to appeal to beginners and those put off by the then substantial cost of full digital systems, DELTA offered control of up to four locomotives simultaneously. DELTA decoders did not have motor regulation and initially lacked any way of easily changing the address. DELTA has now been discontinued, simplified digital controllers & decoders are offered instead (Mobile Station & 36xxx series locomotives).

Early DELTA controllers lacked the Function / Off buttons and c80 Digital models running on DELTA had Function permanently on which affected any such models equipped with TELEX remote couplers. c90 models running on DELTA had Function permanently off.

== Märklin Digital (mfx) ==
In 2004 the completely new Märklin Systems digital control was unveiled. A new two way protocol can control up to 65,000 digital devices, each locomotive can have up to 128 speed steps and 16 functions. Developed by ESU with all components initially made by them for Märklin, later the name "Märklin Systems" was dropped and once again the system is known as "Märklin Digital".

Introduced in 2013, the extended mfx+ digital control system provides additional locomotive parameters and allows feedback with mfx+ equipped locomotives. The virtual fuel state of each mfx+ equipped locomotive can be set and monitored. For steam locomotives, additional parameters such as boiler pressure and fire state can be set, monitored, and controlled. Eventually, the locomotive must return to a fuelling point for replenishment (feedback modules denote the fuelling points). Signals may also be fitted with feedback modules, requiring acknowledgement by the operator as the train passes, just as in real operation.

The new controller software provides a cab view of the locomotive to allow control of all parameters. This gives a computer simulation view of the locomotive while controlling a model.

=== Controllers ===
The Central Station 60212 had two locomotive controllers built in and a large monochrome LCD screen with graphical display and descriptive names for locomotives. The controller stored a database of pre-mfx digital locomotives with their functions so that they may be easily set up (mfx decoders send their own available functions to the controller). The new protocol was incompatible with the earlier version but Central Station could be set to send either protocol to any decoder so older locomotives could be controlled alongside mfx equipped locomotives. The Central Station incorporated all functionality of the earlier keyboard, memory, and interface modules as well as being able to control up to 8 automatic shuttle (point to point) trains.

The hand held Mobile Station 60652 was also offered which has a single locomotive controller, small LCD screen, and 9 function buttons. This unit could be used on its own as a low cost digital controller with up to ten locomotives in its own database or plugged into a Central Station as an additional controller.

In 2008 Märklin announced a new second generation Central Station 60213 with colour display and enhanced features, this unit developed by a different contractor. The Central Station was re-numbered to 60214 a few months later, with more capabilities than 60213. In 2009 a software update for the CS2 was announced which, among other enhancements, adds support for the NMRA DCC protocol.

Also in 2009 a new 60653 Mobile Station was announced, completely redesigned with many more features than the earlier model. As before, the new Mobile Station can be used by itself or as an additional controller with the new Central Station.

In 2016 Central Station 3 was announced. The main change is a new touch screen which replaces all of the function buttons with on screen options. Only the two speed controllers and emergency stop bar remain as separate controls. Central Station 3+ adds the ability to act as a master unit in a multi controller set up.

=== Decoders ===
Decoders are designated mfx and can communicate with the controller, dynamically negotiating an individual address and passing the locomotive description and all available functions to the controller. All control parameters are retained by the decoder in firmware and adjusted using the controller or computer. mfx decoders can also interpret the older Motorola format and so will work with previous central units.

=== Early Problems ===
Märklin experienced compatibility problems with the first Central Station (CS1) leading to a recall and extensive rebuild resulting in CS1 V2. Meantime some important components, especially an mfx compatible booster, were unavailable. Eventually booster 60173 became available for use with any mfx system.

ESU, the original developers of CS1, produced V3 software update. This had many of the enhancements offered by CS2, including track layout views for controlling signals and turnouts, and large cab view locomotive control display.

== Model numbering ==
From the 1950s Märklin models had four digit numbers, the first two being the group and the last two the individual model. Locomotives fitted with the original c80 digital decoders were numbered 36xx (36 followed by two digits e.g. 3615) and the first models fitted with c90 decoders 37xx (e.g. 3702). In 1997 Märklin had to expand the numbering to five digits 37xxx and a few new c90 equipped models were numbered with five digits before the c91 decoder was fitted to all subsequent models. New 36xxx models are budget models fitted with low cost digital decoders lacking motor regulation.

When Märklin introduced the specially developed C-Sine motor in 2000 these models were numbered 39xxx, some were also produced as 37xxx.

== H0 digital upgrade ==
Märklin offered many different decoders and kits to upgrade analog locomotives to digital control. A digital decoder was the basis and many kits also included a permanent magnet and 5 pole armature to upgrade the motor and convert it to DC (such decoders rectify track current to DC for the motor and any accessories, such as lighting or sound). For many years, unlike Digital Command Control, Märklin did not use a plug in connector for the decoder and so conversion involved soldering output wires.

Most decoders also provide motor regulation (speed control) with adjustments for acceleration & braking delay (artificial inertia) and maximum speed. DELTA decoders never provided motor regulation and originally had to be set to address 0 for analog operation. mfx decoders provide many additional motor control parameters, all adjusted using the main controller (Central Station) or a computer.

Märklin locomotives had several motor types and many upgrades were for a particular version.

=== First generation conversion kits ===
Almost all the first generation decoders had DIP switches to set the address and potentiometers to set motor regulation, requiring tools to open the model and make adjustments. The motor parameters are maximum speed and artificial inertia, in other words the delay after making a speed change on the controller and the response of the decoder, which allows smooth transitions.

- 6080 Decoder for all AC locomotives. No motor regulation, 14 speed steps, 1 switched function.
- 6081 Decoder for all DC locomotives. No motor regulation, 14 speed steps, 1 switched function (part of Märklin's original Digital offering for DC operation).
- 6090 Conversion kit for drum commutator motor (DCM) AC locomotives, including motor upgrade components. Motor regulation with adjustable parameters, 14 speed steps, 1 switched function.
- 60901 Conversion kit for drum commutator motor (DCM) AC locomotives, including motor upgrade components. Motor regulation with adjustable parameters, 28 speed steps, 5 switched functions.
- 60902 Decoder upgrade for 6090 digital models. Motor regulation with adjustable parameters, 28 speed steps, 5 switched functions.
- 60903 Conversion kit for older small flat commutator motor (SFCM) AC locomotives, including motor upgrade components. Motor regulation with adjustable parameters, 28 speed steps, 5 switched functions.
- 60904 Conversion kit for older large flat commutator motor (LFCM) AC locomotives, including motor upgrade components. Motor regulation with adjustable parameters, 28 speed steps, 5 switched functions.
- 60905 Decoder for Faulhaber motor locomotives. Motor regulation with adjustable parameters, 28 speed steps, 5 switched functions.
- 60960 Function decoder for locomotives, carriages, or accessories. No motor control, 5 switched functions.
- 60961 Function decoder for locomotives, with direction change of main function. No motor control, 5 switched functions.
- 60760 Conversion kit for drum commutator motor (DCM) AC locomotives, including motor upgrade components. Motor regulation with adjustable parameters, 28 speed steps, 1 switched function (later low cost upgrade offered after the introduction of mfx. These decoders are programmable by the controller and so do not require tools to change parameters).

=== DELTA conversion kits ===
- 6603 Original DELTA decoder, address change by solder pad, later by DIP switch, with 4 addresses. 14 speed steps, no switched function.
- 66031 DELTA decoder, address change by DIP switch with 4 addresses. 28 speed steps, 1 switched function.
- 66032 DELTA decoder, address change by DIP switch with 80 addresses and automatic mode detection (digital / analog). 28 speed steps, 1 switched function.

=== mfx conversion kits ===
All mfx decoders provide motor regulation with 128 speed steps and multiple adjustable parameters, plus 16 switched functions. All are programmable by the Central Station, tools are not required to change parameters.

- 60921 Conversion kit for drum commutator motor (DCM) AC locomotives, including motor upgrade components.
- 60922 Decoder for drum commutator motor (DCM) AC locomotives, specifically to upgrade existing digital models.
- 60923 Conversion kit for older small flat commutator motor (SFCM) AC locomotives, including motor upgrade components.
- 60924 Conversion for kit older large flat commutator motor (LFCM) AC locomotives, including motor upgrade components.
- 60931 Decoder upgrade for existing digital locomotives 6090, 60901, 60903, 60904, with speaker and sounds for steam locomotives.
- 60932 Decoder upgrade for existing digital locomotives 6090, 60901, 60903, 60904, with speaker and sounds for diesel locomotives.
- 60933 Decoder upgrade for existing digital locomotives 6090, 60901, 60903, 60904, with speaker and sounds for electric locomotives.

=== mLD and mSD conversion kits, mLD/3 (Märklin LokDekoder) and mSD/3 (Märklin SoundDekoder) ===
In 2015 Märklin released a new series of retrofit decoders built on a 32 bit architecture, compared to 8 bits of the previous generation. The mLD/mSD generation is faster, has more memory, including 64 Mb memory reserved for sound data, as well as improved sound processing. With 4096 speed steps for the motor, and self calibration, motor characteristics, especially at low speeds, are improved. Along with these decoders, Märklin released the 60971 mDP/3, (Märklin Dekoder Programmer), a USB device which allows for easy programming of parameters of the mLD/mSD decoders as well as customizing sounds and images. The firmware of the decoders can be updated. The related software, mDT (Märklin Dekoder Tool) is adapted for Windows platforms.

The decoder upgrade kits are not suitable for motors with older field-wound coils. Locomotives with these motors must be converted with the appropriate motor retrofit kits, item numbers 60941, 60943, or 60944. The decoders can be operated with the 6020, 6021, Mobile Station, and Central Station controllers and can be programmed with the protocols MM, mfx, and DCC

The retrofit kits come in 3 different formats. All the mSD3 kits come with 2 speaker options, small and large, except for 60978 and 60979, including one speaker.

For upgrades to fixed circuit board with a 21 pin decoder interface.

- 60972, mLD3, circuit board with soldered on wires for the locomotive side and a male 21 pin connector for the included decoder.
- 60975, mSD3, (Steam) circuit board with soldered on wires for the locomotive side and a male 21 pin connector for the included decoder
- 60976, mSD3, (Diesel) circuit board with soldered on wires for the locomotive side and a male 21 pin connector for the included decoder
- 60977, mSD3, (Electric) circuit board with soldered on wires for the locomotive side and a male 21 pin connector for the included decoder

For upgrades of 36xxx series Märklin/Trix fixed circuit board locomotives with LED lights.

- 60978, mSD3, 21 pin connector for the included decoder with pre-loaded Diesel sounds.
- 60979, mSD3, 21 pin connector for the included decoder with pre-loaded Electric sounds.

For use with existing 8 pin connector in locomotive

- 60982, mLD3 decoder with soldered on wires for the locomotive side. Male 8 pin connector included.
- 60985, mSD3 decoder (Steam) with soldered on wires for the locomotive side. Male 8 pin connector included. Separate wires for connection of included speakers
- 60986, mSD3 decoder (Diesel) with soldered on wires for the locomotive side. Male 8 pin connector included. Separate wires for connection of included speakers
- 60987, mSD3 decoder (Electric) with soldered on wires for the locomotive side. Male 8 pin connector included. Separate wires for connection of included speakers

== Maxi 1 gauge digital upgrade ==
Maxi locomotives were always fitted with plug-in DELTA decoders, upgrading merely entailed exchanging the decoder.

- 60955 Decoder upgrade for Maxi locomotives. Motor regulation with 28 speed steps and adjustable parameters, 5 switched functions.

== See also ==
- Digital Command Control
