= Digital Command Control =

System for digital control of model railways

Digital Command Control (DCC) is a standardized communication protocol for the control of model railways. Products conforming to DCC standards are therefore compatible regardless of manufacturer, enabling interoperability between all model railways running DCC. The standards and recommended practices that define DCC are developed by the DCC Working Group of the National Model Railroad Association (NMRA). The DCC logo trademark is owned by the NMRA.

The most apparent feature of DCC is that it allows independent control of model locomotives occupying the same section of track by encoding a digital signal into the electrical waveform, for which to power locomotives, to communicate directly with the desired locomotive. This is in contrast to analog control schemes where locomotives are required to be in electrically isolated sections of track to be independently controlled. Since locomotives move along the track by nature, coordination is required to couple two sections of track before a locomotive bridges (electrically shorts) the gap between them and to prevent two locomotives from occupying the same section of track. On a DCC railway, all locomotives receive the same electrical signal, but each locomotive only responds to the commands that are addressed to itself. This feature gives rise to the expression that DCC requires "only two wires".

DCC has enabled a high degree of portability, configurability, and extensibility to model railroading. Users are able to bring locomotives and throttles to model rail layouts at homes, clubs, and large meetups without worrying about compatibility. Users are able to customize locomotive behaviours and controller settings to their liking. Manufacturers are able to produce a wide variety of products with different purposes that are ensured to work with other standard-conforming products.

== History ==
The first digital control system was Hornby Railways Zero 1, introduced in the middle 1970s. The next widely available digital command control system was developed (under contract by Lenz Elektronik GmbH of Germany) in the 1980s for two German model railway manufacturers, Märklin and Arnold. The first digital decoders that Lenz produced appeared on the market early 1989 for Arnold (N scale) and mid 1990 for Märklin (Z scale, H0 scale and 1 gauge; Digital=). Märklin and Arnold exited the agreement over patent issues, but Lenz continued to develop the system. In 1992 Stan Ames, who later chaired the NMRA/DCC Working Group, investigated the Märklin/Lenz system as possible candidate for the NMRA/DCC standards. When the NMRA Command Control committee requested submissions from manufacturers for its proposed command control standard in the 1990s, Märklin and Keller Engineering submitted their systems for evaluation. The committee was impressed by the Märklin/Lenz system and had settled on digital early in the process. The NMRA eventually developed their own protocol based on the Lenz system and further extended it. The system was later named Digital Command Control. The first commercial systems built on the NMRA DCC were demonstrated at the 1993 NMRA Convention, when the proposed DCC Standard was announced. The proposed standard was published in the October 1993 issue of Model Railroader magazine prior to its adoption.

The DCC protocol is the subject of two standards published by the NMRA: S-9.1 specifies the electrical standard, and S-9.2 specifies the communications standard. Several recommended practices documents are also available.

The DCC protocol defines signal levels and timings on the track. DCC does not specify the protocol used between the DCC command station and other components such as additional throttles. A variety of proprietary standards exist, and in general, command stations from one vendor are not compatible with throttles from another vendor.

=== RailCom ===
In 2006 Lenz, together with Kühn, Zimo and Tams, started development of an extension to the DCC protocol to allow a feedback channel from decoders to the command station. This feedback channel can typically be used to signal which train occupies a certain section, but as well to inform the command station of the actual speed of an engine. This feedback channel is known under the name RailCom, and was standardized in 2007 as NMRA S-9.3.1.

== System components ==
The fundamental DCC system consists of a single command station, and at least one of each of the following: a power station, a throttle and a decoder. The command station, power station and throttle are conceptually distinct devices but are often found combined into a single physical "all-in-one" device as an entry-level product.

- The command station acts as an interface between the throttles and the decoders. Any DCC system will only have one command station. The communication protocol on the throttle network is not specified by any DCC standard and as such, command stations are devices that convert signals from a throttle network to the standardized DCC encoding (but without power amplification). They often include many other features not necessarily part of any DCC standard.
- Power stations (commonly known as boosters) act as current amplifiers, and provide most or all of the electrical power required by DCC vehicles by amplifying the command signal from the command station. The number of power stations required in a DCC system will depend on the number of vehicles that are intended to receive commands (and thus draw current) from any one command station.
- Throttles, both virtual and physical, provide an interface for the user to interact with the DCC system. Commands issued by a user via a throttle are sent to the command station to be forwarded to the decoders (or another throttle). The number of throttles required in a DCC system will depend on the number of users interacting with the system. Typically a user will not operate more than one or two throttles at any given time.
- Decoders are receivers to commands forwarded from the command station. Each decoder is assigned an address and responds only to commands issued to their respective address, hence it can be thought that they 'decode' messages. Some decoders are transceivers, which can transmit data back to the command station to be forwarded to the throttles. Despite their name, decoding addresses is only a portion of a decoder's purpose. Decoders typically contain additional circuitry (e.g. for power regulation, motor control, sound synthesis) because once the decoder receives commands destined for its address, decoders need to perform the command requested of it. Mobile decoders are designed to be installed in a moving vehicle, such as a model locomotive, and control nearly every aspect of the vehicle's behavior, such as direction of travel, speed of travel, lighting effects and sound effects. Accessory or stationary decoders enable basic GPIO to operate any other stationary features, such as turnouts, signals, or any animated scenes.

== Configuration variables ==
A configuration variable (CV) is an 8-bit value stored in a decoder's non-volatile memory. Each CV allows the user to configure or view one or more aspects of the decoder's function. Programming CVs are the primary way through which a user can customize and adapt a decoder to their use. Such customizations include motor PID coefficients, voltage-to-speed mapping, lighting effects, function output mapping, sound effects, sound volume, and various other behaviours. Command stations typically provide facilities for programming CVs using a throttle. The only CVs that are absolutely standardized (by NMRA S-9.2.2) are CV1 for the decoder address, CV7 for the decoder version as determined by the manufacturer, CV8 for the manufacturer ID as assigned by the NMRA, and typically, CV29 for basic movement configuration. All other CVs are either recommended or optional at the manufacturers discretion.

== Communication protocol ==
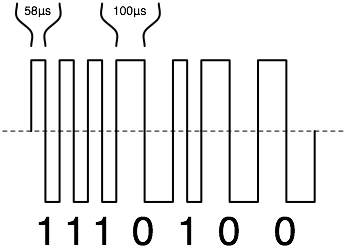
A sequence of 7 bits encoded with DCC. Note the peak-to-peak voltage is constant and thus does not carry information. Note the given values of time are for each half-cycle of a square wave.

The electrical waveform sent to the decoders (typically along the model railway track) serves as both a digital signal and carrier of electric power. The power carried is the peak-to-peak voltage multiplied by the current. The voltage is specified by the NMRA to be based on the modelling scale. The data is encoded via frequency modulation by varying the period of individual square waves. A binary 1 is represented by a 116 μs nominal period (duration), while a 0 is represented by a 200 μs nominal period. These 0 and 1 bits form packets which contain a preamble, the recipient decoder's address, an instruction, and a checksum. As such, the digital signal is encoded entirely in time and is completely independent of the waveform voltage. As there is no long-term polarity in the waveform, direction of travel of a DCC vehicle is independent of the instantaneous polarity between the rails, as it would in conventional DC operation. There is no ground reference in the DCC signal, and as such, either rail may be used as a reference to the other. Additionally, this means that a square wave beginning with a rising edge is interpreted identically as a square wave beginning with a falling edge, because the digital information is carried within the period of the wave.

== Layout command control ==
Layout command control (LCC), previously known as "NMRANet", is a standard introduced in 2015 designed to relieve congestion on the DCC communication bus. Increasing use of stationary decoders to achieve automation or animation has resulted in a large amount of packets causing congestion on the DCC bus. LCC seeks to retain communications related to vehicle control on the DCC bus and move all other communications onto the LCC bus.

== Advantages over analog control ==
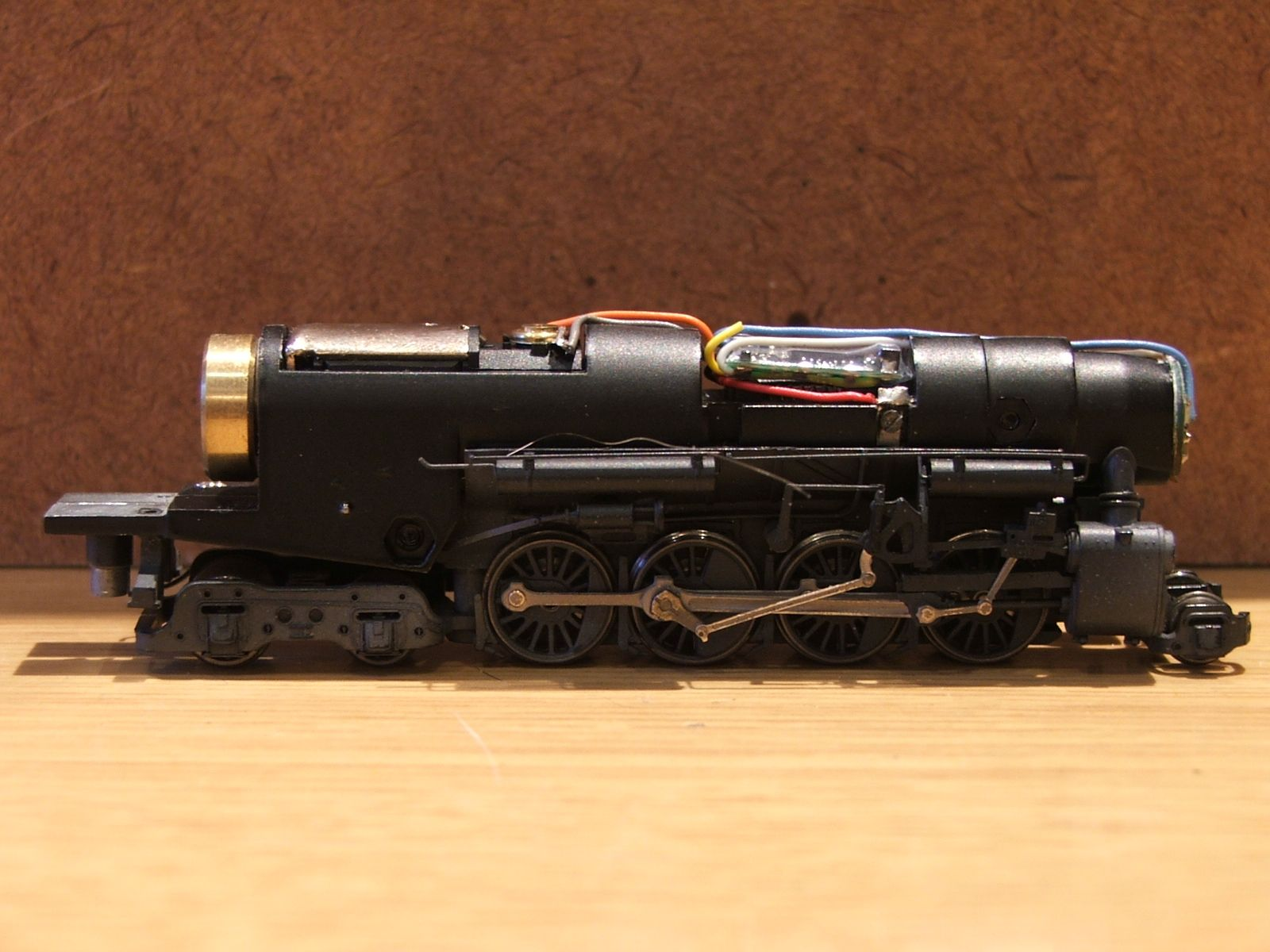
A DCC decoder installed in an N scale steam locomotive

The great advantage of digital control is the individual control of locomotives wherever they are on the layout. With analog control, operating more than one locomotive independently requires the track to be wired into separate blocks each having switches to select the controller. Using digital control, locomotives may be controlled wherever they are.

Digital locomotive decoders often include inertia simulation, where the locomotive will gradually increase or decrease speeds in a realistic manner. Many decoders will also constantly adjust motor power to maintain constant speed. Most digital controllers allow an operator to set the speed of one locomotive and then select another locomotive to control its speed while the previous locomotive maintains its speed.

Technological developments in the 2010s included on-board sound modules for locomotives as small as N scale, made possible by advancements in smartphones, which tend to use small yet high-quality speakers.

Wiring requirements are generally reduced compared to a conventional DC powered layout. With digital control of accessories, the wiring is distributed to accessory decoders rather than being individually connected to a central control panel. For portable layouts this can greatly reduce the number of inter-board connections - only the digital signal and any accessory power supplies need cross baseboard joins.

== Competing systems ==
There are two main European alternatives: Selectrix, an open Normen Europäischer Modellbahnen (NEM) standard, and the Märklin Digital proprietary system. The US Rail-Lynx system provides power with a fixed voltage to the rails while commands are sent digitally using infrared light.

Other systems include the Digital Command System and Trainmaster Command Control.

Several major manufacturers (including Märklin, Fleischmann, Roco, Hornby and Bachmann), have entered the DCC market alongside makers which specialize in it (including Lenz, Digitrax, ESU, ZIMO, Kühn, Tams, NCE, Digikeijs, and CVP Products, Sound Traxx, Train Control Systems and ZTC). Most Selectrix central units are multi protocol units supporting DCC fully or partially (e.g. Rautenhaus, Stärz and MTTM).

== See also ==
- Digital model railway control systems
- List of network buses
