= Roco (model railroads) =

Company

Roco, based in Salzburg, Austria, is a manufacturer of model railway equipment.

== History ==
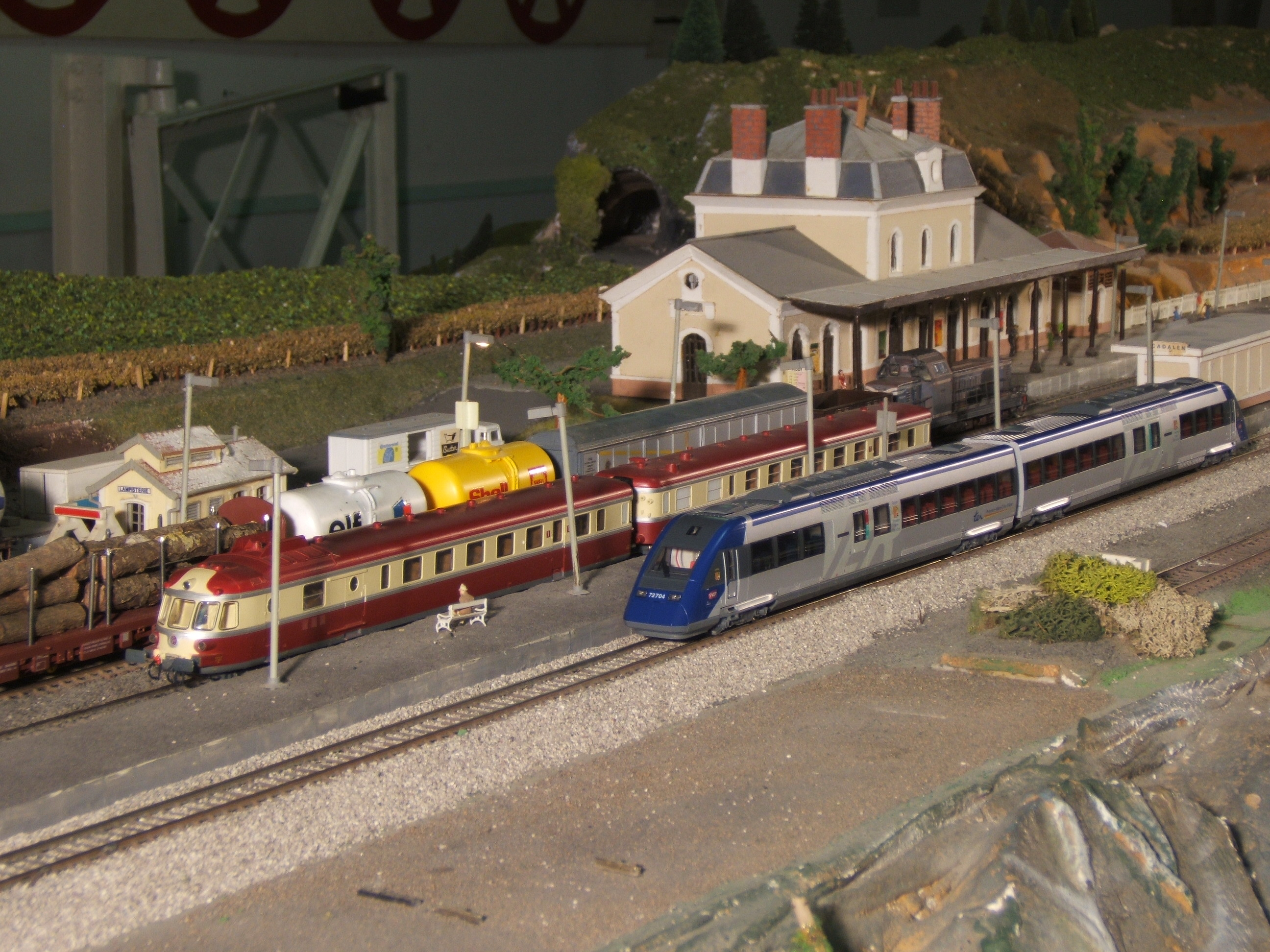

The company was founded in 1960 by Ing. Heinz Rössler and started with a plastic Minitanks series of military vehicles. After export to the USA became successful, the model line was expanded with model trains in HO scale and the smaller N scale. TT scale was also subsequently added to the product line. The model rail product line covers many European countries including Germany, Belgium, Luxembourg, France, Spain, Austria, Italy, Switzerland, Sweden and the Netherlands, and also the USA. In 1974 and 1975, Lionel HO trains were produced by Roco before starting to move production to the Far East in 1976, completing the move by 1978. Some of Lionel HO trains between 1974 and 1978 were made by Athearn.

On July 15, 2005 Roco Modellspielwaren GmbH was declared bankrupt and taken over by the creditor Raiffeisenbank. After restructuring, a new company Modelleisenbahn GmbH was formed to consolidate the model railroad market. The Roco brand and associated logo continued to be used. To sharpen the focus on model railways, on October 1, 2007, the 'Minitank' product series was divested to the German model car manufacturer Herpa. In February 2008 Modelleisenbahn acquired Fleischmann from the owner family. Moving some production to lower cost factories like Slovakia and later Vietnam, the companies saw profitability again. Roco and Fleischmann continue as separate brands under Modelleisenbahn GmbH, while benefiting from economies of scale through joint development projects, marketing and procurement.

== Products ==
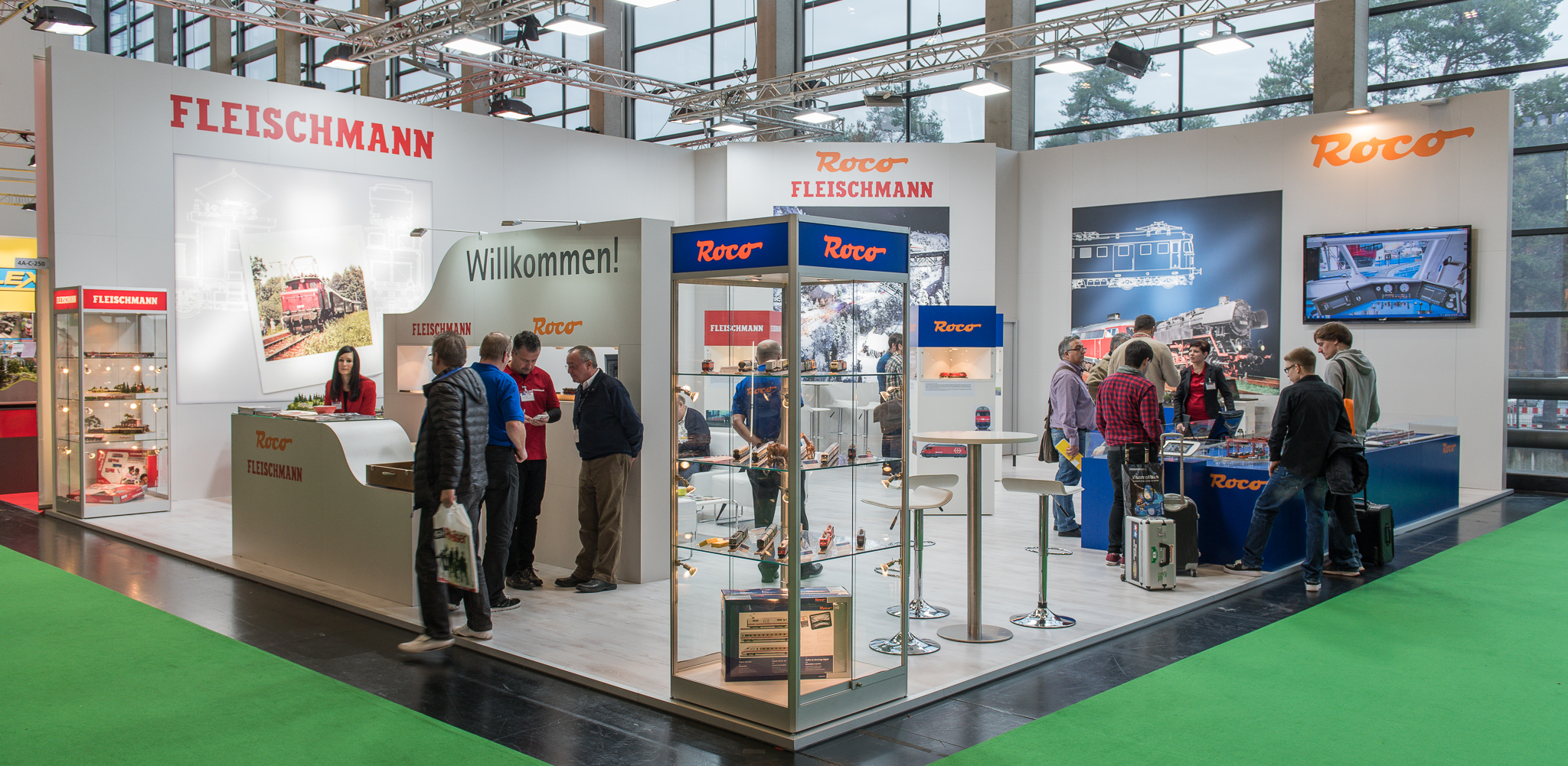

From 2019 Roco is focused on HO gauge railroads, while Fleischmann is focused on N gauge railroads.

Roco has also focused on innovation in digital train control for multiple gauges under the Z21 brand, where users can use iPhone/iPad/Android devices to operate railway models. With these strategies Roco/Fleischmann is the number one company in the DC railroad market segment in Europe, and number two company in the overall railroad company after Märklin which is focused on AC railroad models.

Below are some examples of Roco train models.

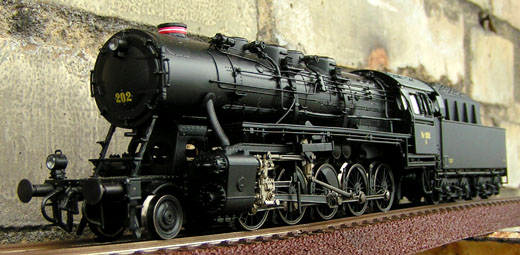
DSB N 202

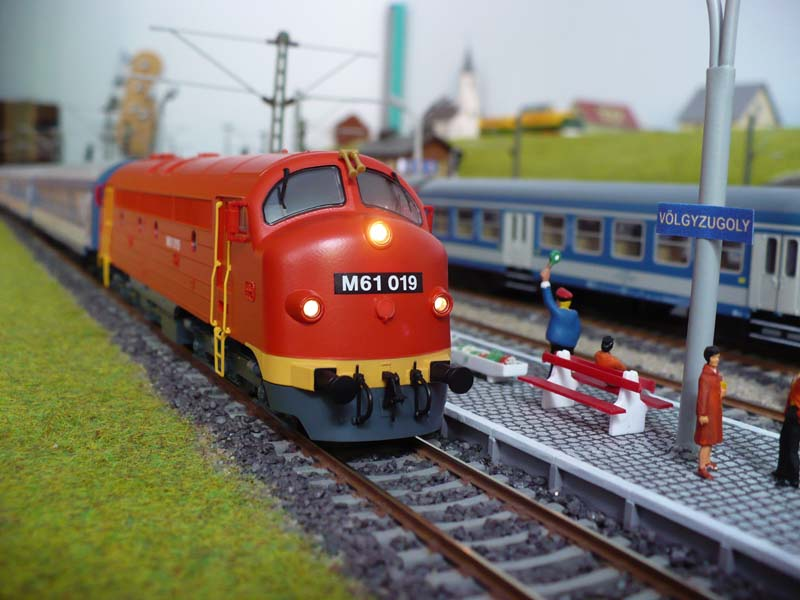
M61 019

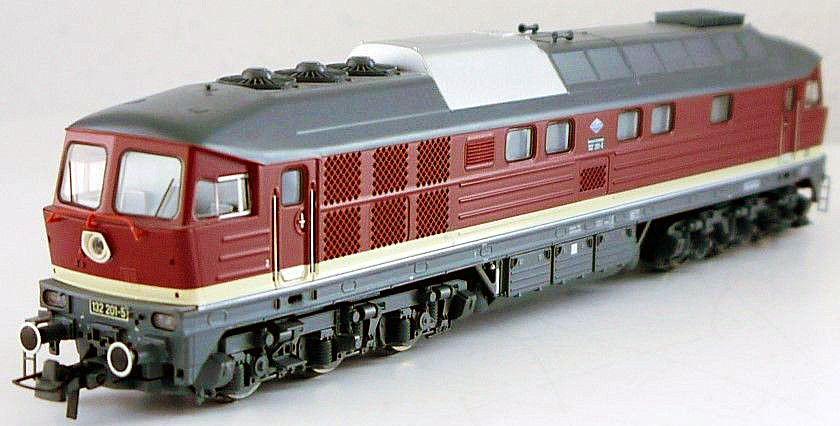
DR BR 132 201-5

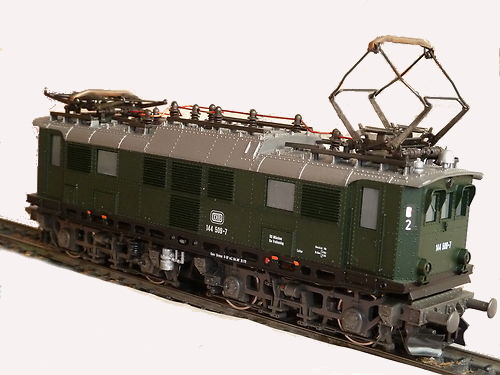
DB E 144

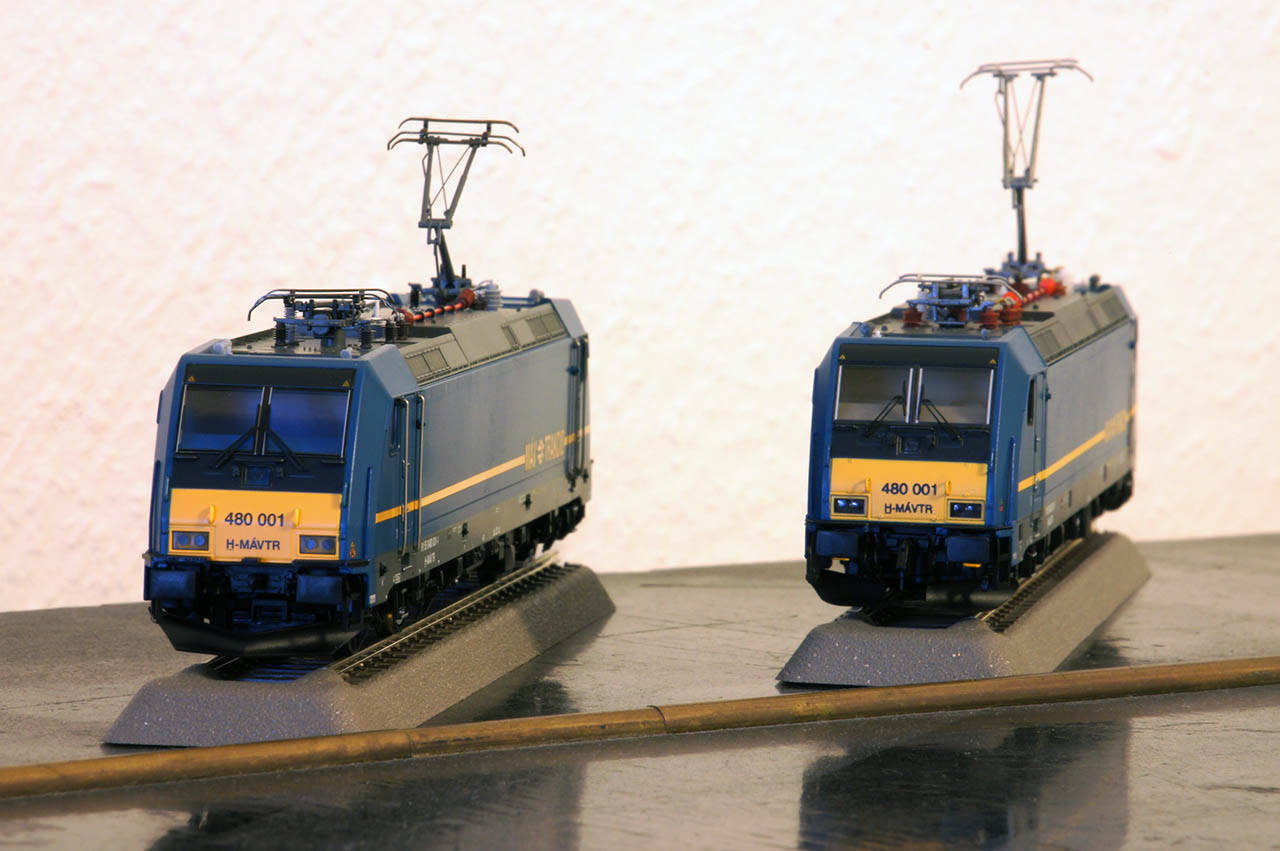
MAV 480 001
