= Trix Express =

Table-Top model train system

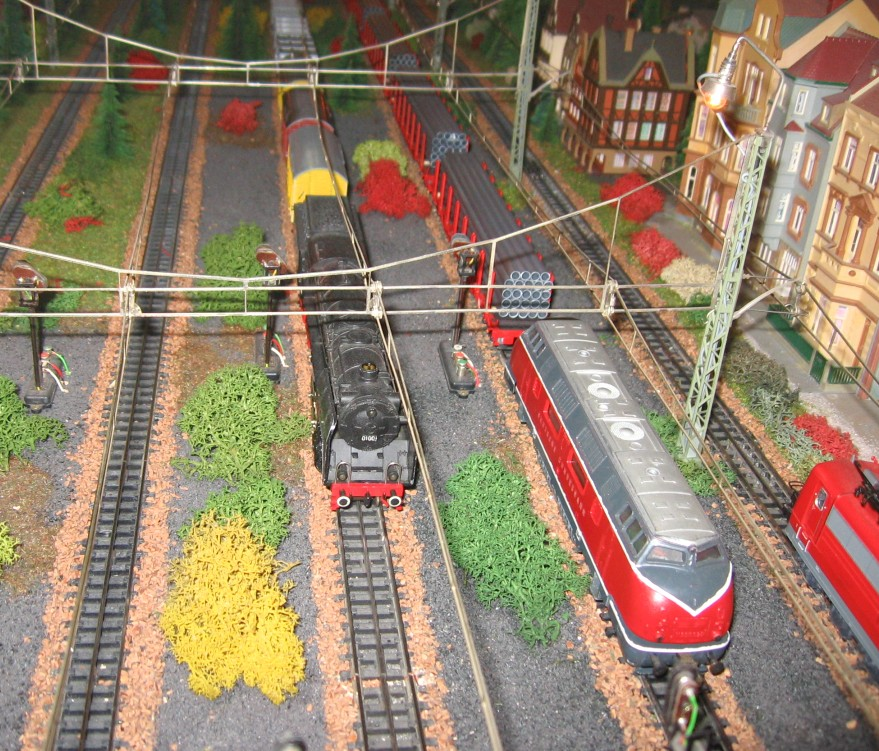
left side BR 01, right side BR V-200

Trix Express was the main model train product range of the Trix of Nuremberg, Germany, currently owned by the Märklin company of Göppingen Germany.

The Trix Express system was first introduced at the Leipzig exhibition in the spring of 1935. It was the first reasonable priced H0 (Half Zero) Table-Top model train system using 16.5mm track (1:87). In Germany the system was marketed as Trix Express. After the Nazis forced the Jewish owners of the company Stefan Bing and others to sell their shares, they moved to Britain and founded the Trix Ltd London, which initially used the same system. This brand was called TTR - TRIX TWIN RAILWAY.

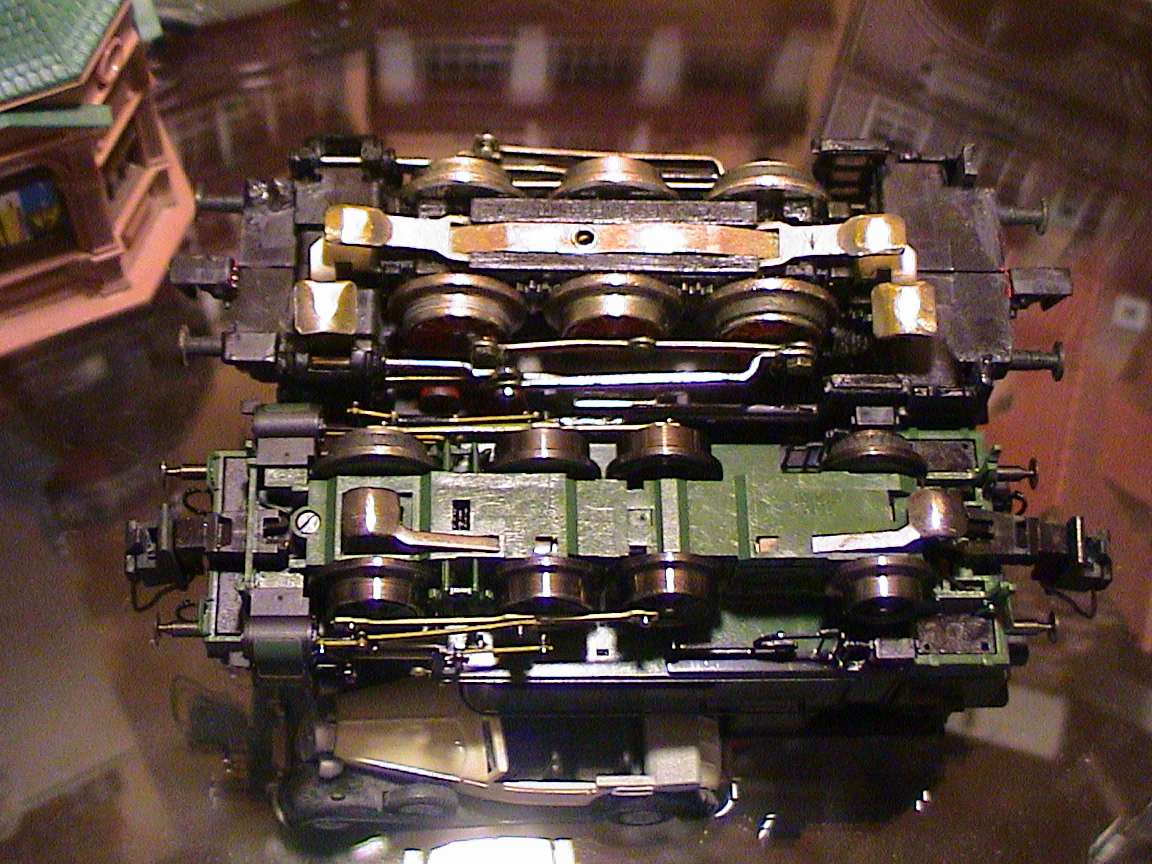
sliding contact at older (above) and newer (below, only third rail) models

Like other systems introduced before WW2 it used a third (centre) rail as a means to supply current to the models. Unlike other systems, such as Märklin H0 (still produced today) and Hornby Railways, the outer tracks were insulated, using the centre rail as a common pick-up. This allowed the independent operation of two model engines on the same track and even three if overhead catenary wires were used.

The original system used 14V AC power. The German company changed to 14V DC in 1953 and used the third rail system until 2003 when the last models were produced under the auspices of the Märklin company. Because of a great lobby to Märklin, Trix Express has been re-initiated in 2013 by producing new rolling stock. The British Trix Twin company changed to DC in 1956, abandoned the three rail system in the early 1960s and disappeared altogether after a number of take-overs and mergers during the 1970s.

Apart from the centre pick-up, the Trix Express system also retained the larger wheel flanges, customary in the 1930s, right till the recent end, making derailments rather uncommon, but at the same time making their rolling stock incompatible with more modern two-rail NEM systems.

The Trix Express system still has a large following in countries such as United Kingdom, Germany, and the Netherlands with active clubs, and is readily available on eBay.
