= Ernst Plank =

Toy manufacturer in Nuremberg, Germany

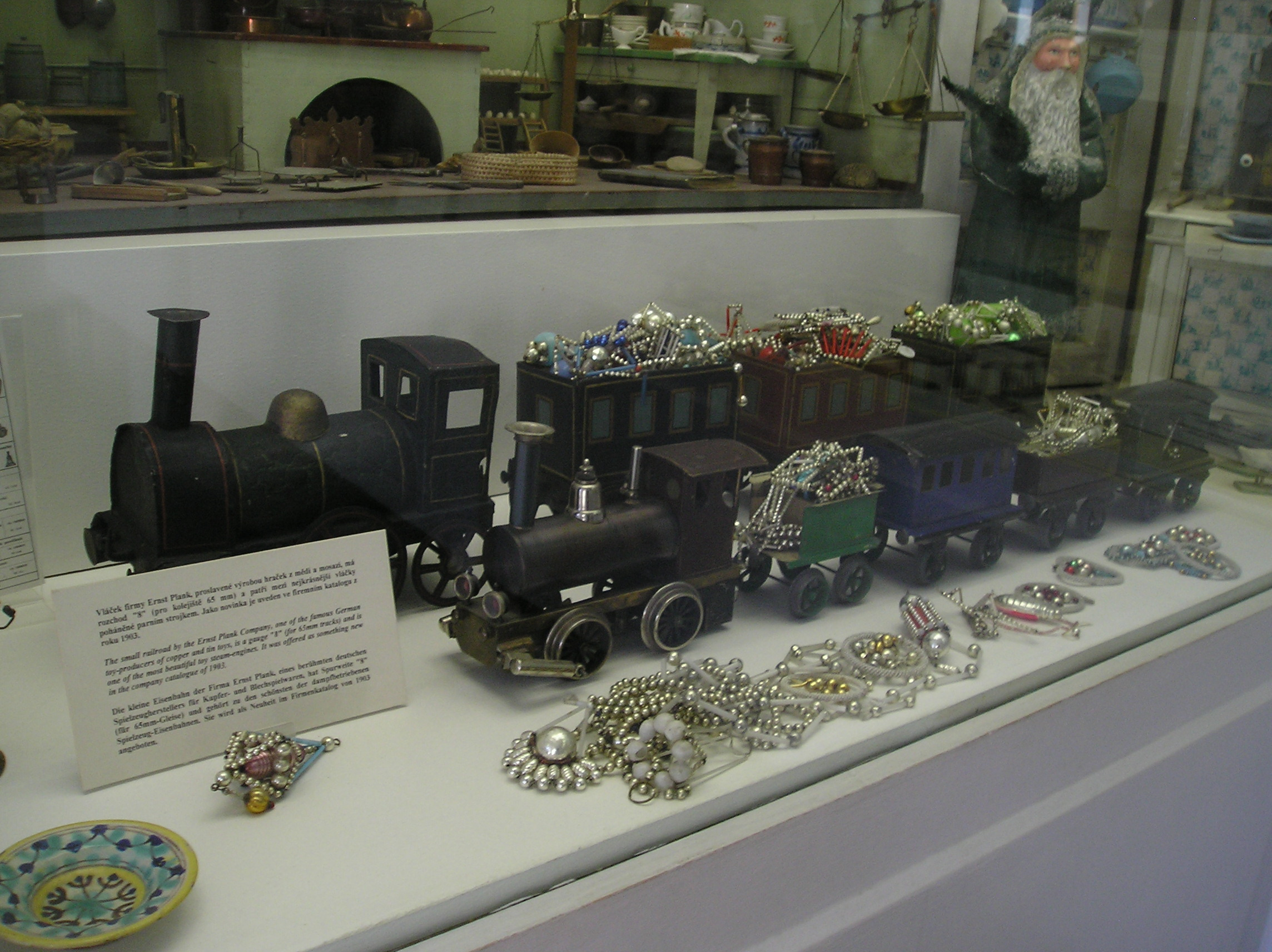
A 1903 toy train from Ernst Plank on display in The Toy Museum in Prague

Ernst Plank was a German manufacturing company. Started in 1866 and named after its founder the company initially built toy steam engines and magic lanterns at Hochfederstrasse 40 in Nuremberg. Ernst Plank was one of the first companies to produce toy steam engines and became famous for its copper and tin toys. The company manufactured stationary steam engines along with steam railway engines and track. Some railway carriages and accessories were produced alongside Märklin.

The company suffered during the economic crisis in the 1920s, losing the majority of its market significance. The company was sold in 1934 to brothers Hans and Fritz Schaller, who gave up the production of toys to focus on the optical market. Toy trains of the company based in Nuremberg are highly collectable in part due to their rarity.

The company continued to produce movie projectors for home use, finding a lucrative market in the 1960s and 1970s. The development of video cameras drastically reduced the market especially for Super 8 film. In 1985 production was discontinued.
