= Caroline Märklin =

19th century businesswoman

- Born: Carolina Friederika Hettich; 13 March 1826; Ludwigsburg
- Died: 2 December 1893 (aged 67); Göppingen
- Other names: Caroline Eitel
- Occupation: Travelling salesman
- Years active: 1859–1888
- Organization: Märklin
- Known for: Businesswoman of the 19th century
- Notable work: doll house accessories
- Spouse(s): Theodor Friedrich Wilhelm Märklin (1859–1866), Julius Eitel (1868–1886)
- Children: Eugen Märklin and Karl Märklin
- Parents: Carl Johann Hettich (father); Caroline Friederike Christiane List (mother)

Notes
- Sources: DNB and GEDBAS

Caroline Märklin (née Carolina Friederika Hettich; 13 March 1826 – 2 December 1893) was a woman of affairs and manager of the German company Märklin.

She was born in Ludwigsburg, Germany. When her husband Theodor Märklin founded the company Märklin, she became involved in it as a travelling salesman. Following the accidental death of her first husband in 1866, she took over the management of the toy company, which she managed until her sons took over the company in 1888. Women in Germany would become fully legally able to do business only a century later. (Note: In Germany, women gained the right to vote in 1919; legal equality in 1958; ability to open own bank account without husband in 1962; able to do business without husband's approval 1977.)

== Biography ==
Carolina Hettich grew up in Ludwigsburg, Germany, where she was born in 1826. Little is known about her early life. (Note: Multiple sources say that she is related to Friedrich List, one even claiming her to have studied under him. Reliable sources for her mother's last name being List exit (and were found).) In 1859 she married recently widowed Theodor Friedrich Wilhelm Märklin, a learned tinsmith living in Göppingen. Her husband founded Märklin in the same year, a venture she joined in.

The company manufactured painted sheet metal miniatures and accessories for doll houses. Caroline took care of the distribution of the goods travelling to southern Germany and Switzerland. In that way, she became one of the first "female travelling salesmen".

In the midst of the company's development, Theodor Friedrich Wilhelm Märklin died suddenly at the age of 49 following an accident on December 20, 1866. From then on, Caroline Märklin remained the owner and sole manager of the company.

In 1868, Caroline Märklin remarried Julius Eitel, one of her employees. The company went through a difficult phase economically, and their marriage being very fragile, Julius Eitel committed suicide in 1886. Two years later, her sons, Eugen Märklin and Karl Märklin, took over the company and launched it into the manufacture of model trains – with which it has become almost synonymous today.

Caroline Märklin died on December 2, 1893 at the age of 67.
