= LGB (trains) =

Garden model railway system

LGB (Lehmann Gross Bahn)
- Product type: model railroad products
- Current owner: Märklin
- Country: Germany
- Introduced: 1968
- Previous owners: Ernst Paul Lehmann Patentwerk
- Website: lgb.com

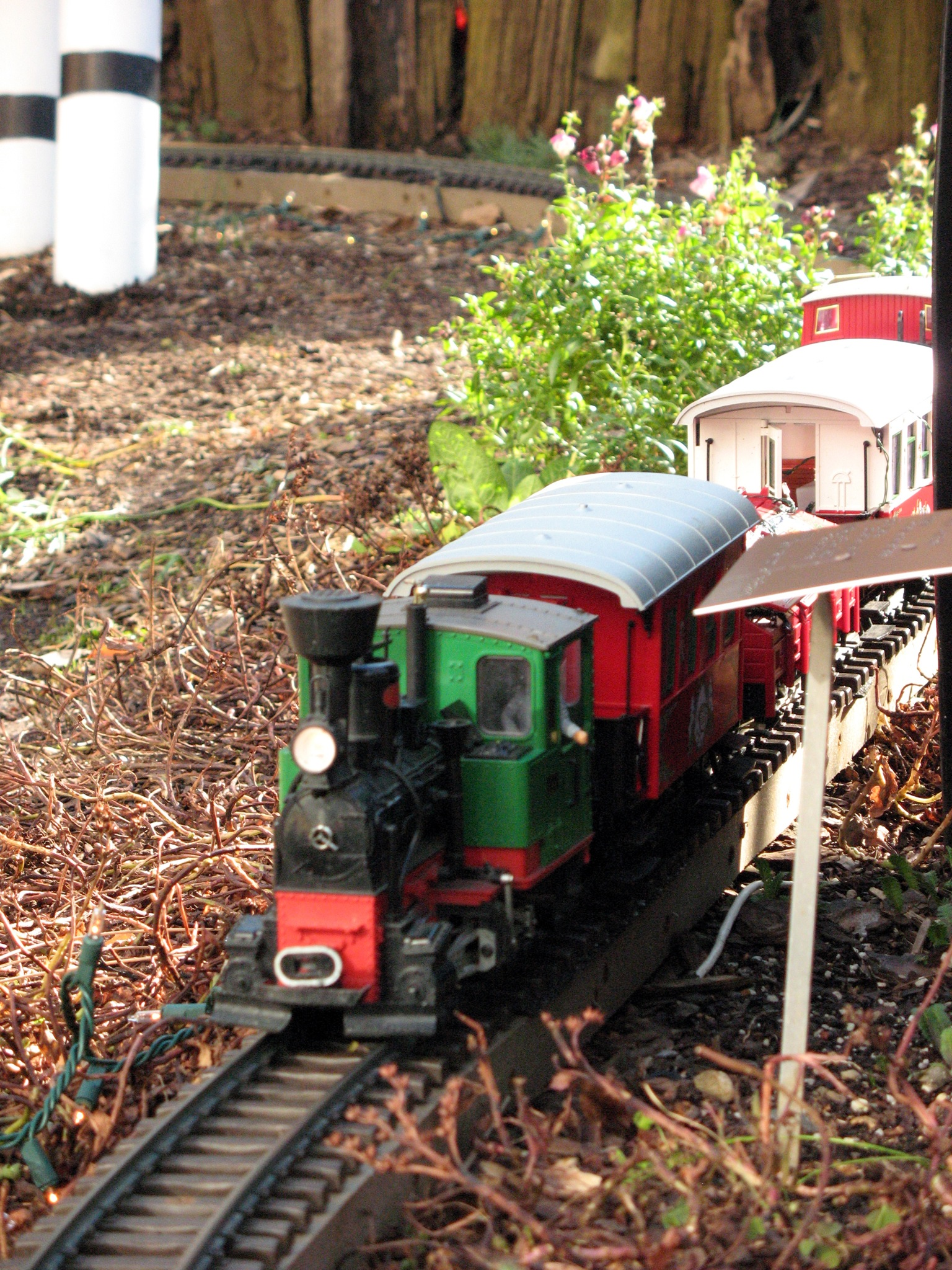
A typical LGB model train on a garden railway layout.

The Lehmann Gross Bahn (LGB; German: Lehmann-Groß-Bahn, "Lehmann Big Train"), made by Ernst Paul Lehmann Patentwerk in Nuremberg, Germany, since 1968 and by Märklin since 2007, is the most popular garden railway model in Europe, although there are also many models of U.S. and Canadian prototypes. LGB caused a revival of garden model railroading in the United States when it was introduced. LGB is sold in North America through Wm. K. Walthers, who took over from Ernst Paul Lehmann's subsidiary, LGB of America, when Märklin bought the LGB assets. Most of the European prototypes were manufactured in Germany, while much of the North American rolling stock was made in China. Production was later moved to Hungary.

LGB trains are responsible for introducing "G" scale to model railroading. The scale ratio used by LGB is nominally 1:22.5, yet many dimensions are often changed to allow operation on very tight R1 curves. American prototypes especially suffer from this. Other G-scale (and Gauge 1) manufacturers produce products that range from 1:20 to 1:32, and for the most part, all use the same track and are compatible with one another. Though they can all run on the same track (45 mm gauge), models representing narrow-gauge versions of trains or locomotives would not normally be run together with models of larger full-scale vehicles. To fit the same standard track the latter must be built using different scales; for example, 1:22.5 scale passengers and/or train crew are somewhat oversized when displayed in proximity with 1:32 models. Though the models may be physically compatible, many people choose a preferred style or era, and pick one ratio (in the range of 1:20.3 to 1:32) for all of their models.

The first loco made under the LGB brand was a model of a small Austrian 0-4-0 named "Stainz", in the LGB logo. It continued in production in 2021, although with a sound system and other mechanical differences to the original 1968 model. Most garden railway enthusiasts have at least one example of a Stainz in their collection as it tends to be a robust loco with good pulling power.

== Bankruptcy and sale of Ernst Paul Lehmann Patentwerk ==
With the model train industry in decline, Ernst Paul Lehmann Patentwerk started restructuring and cost-saving measures in 2002 and further intensified them in 2005. These measures included an employee-supported salary forfeiture and, in mid-2006, transferring Lehman's North American distribution and service subsidiary, LGB of America (LGBoA), to a new United States-based firm, G45. However, on September 1, 2006, Lehmann's financing banks, which had recently been sold to larger, international banks, froze Lehmann's accounts and blocked sale of existing inventory. Lehmann called this a "hostile takeover" and requested bankruptcy protection on September 18, 2006.

Multiple entities, including model train manufacturers Märklin, Piko, and Hornby, bid on Lehmann. It was announced on December 22, 2006, that Hermann Schöntag, the then-owner of the German Rügen narrow-gauge railway, had been selected by Lehmann's creditors to purchase the firm. He founded E.P. Lehmann GmbH & Co. KG and preserved the factory, offices, and 150 jobs in Nuremberg. However, his co-investors backed out; production stopped on March 21, 2007, and the company filed for bankruptcy on April 23, 2007.

== Purchase of LGB by Märklin ==
The second round of bidders included G45, new owner of LGB of America, and Märklin, another German model train manufacturer. Märklin had recently faced a situation similar to Lehmann's; it had been family owned from its founding in 1859 until 2006, when its accumulating debts led to it being sold to Kingsbridge Capital and Goldman Sachs. On July 26, 2007, Märklin was selected to acquire Lehmann's assets; the move was criticized because the Nuremberg location and jobs would not be preserved and because it was speculated that Goldman Sachs, also a Lehmann creditor, orchestrated the purchase.

Shipping and production resumed in fall 2007, with the LGB brand intact. Production moved to Győr, Hungary, and service ultimately moved to Göppingen. Märklin faced a trademark disagreement with LGB of America, which owned the LGB trademark in the United States. Without an agreement between the two, product could not be shipped to or distributed in the United States. An interim agreement concerning only already-manufactured product was signed on September 21, 2007, giving LGBoA exclusive distribution and service rights in North America.

On June 1, 2008, Silvergate Distributors, Inc. was formed as a new company by LGB of America president Anthony Castellano. Silvergate was an independent, American-owned, hobby distributor and was not a subsidiary or "daughter firm" of any other company. Though LGBoA was not dissolved, Silvergate assumed distribution of remaining LGB stock as well as current and new product lines. Silvergate also distributed the Schuco, Brawa, and Piko product lines. In November 2008, Märklin announced that it had resolved the American trademark dispute and planned to resume distribution of LGB products in the United States, with Walthers becoming the American distributor on January 1, 2009. LGB of America and Silvergate Distributors ultimately ceased operations.

On February 4, 2009, Märklin filed for bankruptcy protection in Göppingen. On February 5, 2010, Märklin announced a return to profitability and emerged from bankruptcy on February 17, 2011. On March 21, 2013, the Simba Dickie Group announced that it would purchase Märklin, securing Märklin and LGB's future and giving Märklin's employees job security until 2019.

== In popular culture ==
- The Comedy Inc. sketch, "Ernest the Engine and Others", uses LGB models, buildings, and track.
- In Stuart Little a Santa Fe EMD F7A and B makes a few cameos during the part where Stuart was on the tracks and he almost got hit until he stood up and it passes Stuart in the model railroad.
- In The Santa Clause there are multiple trains which make cameos. The first is in the opening with the song "Carol of the Bells" playing. The second is in the North Pole scene before Charlie and Scott arrive. The third is in the scene in the room in the North Pole where Charlie and Scott sleep.
- In Coming to America the LGB 2017D steam locomotive and the Denver and Rio Grande Western Railroad low sided red gondola is the beer train.
- In The Sopranos Episode of The Blue Comet, The LGB Trains are in Trainland in Long Island New York.
- In the film Small Soldiers, a couple of LGB trains and rolling stock can be seen on a shelf for a background setting. Most assets come from the circus train set.
