= Trix (company) =

Model railroad manufacturer

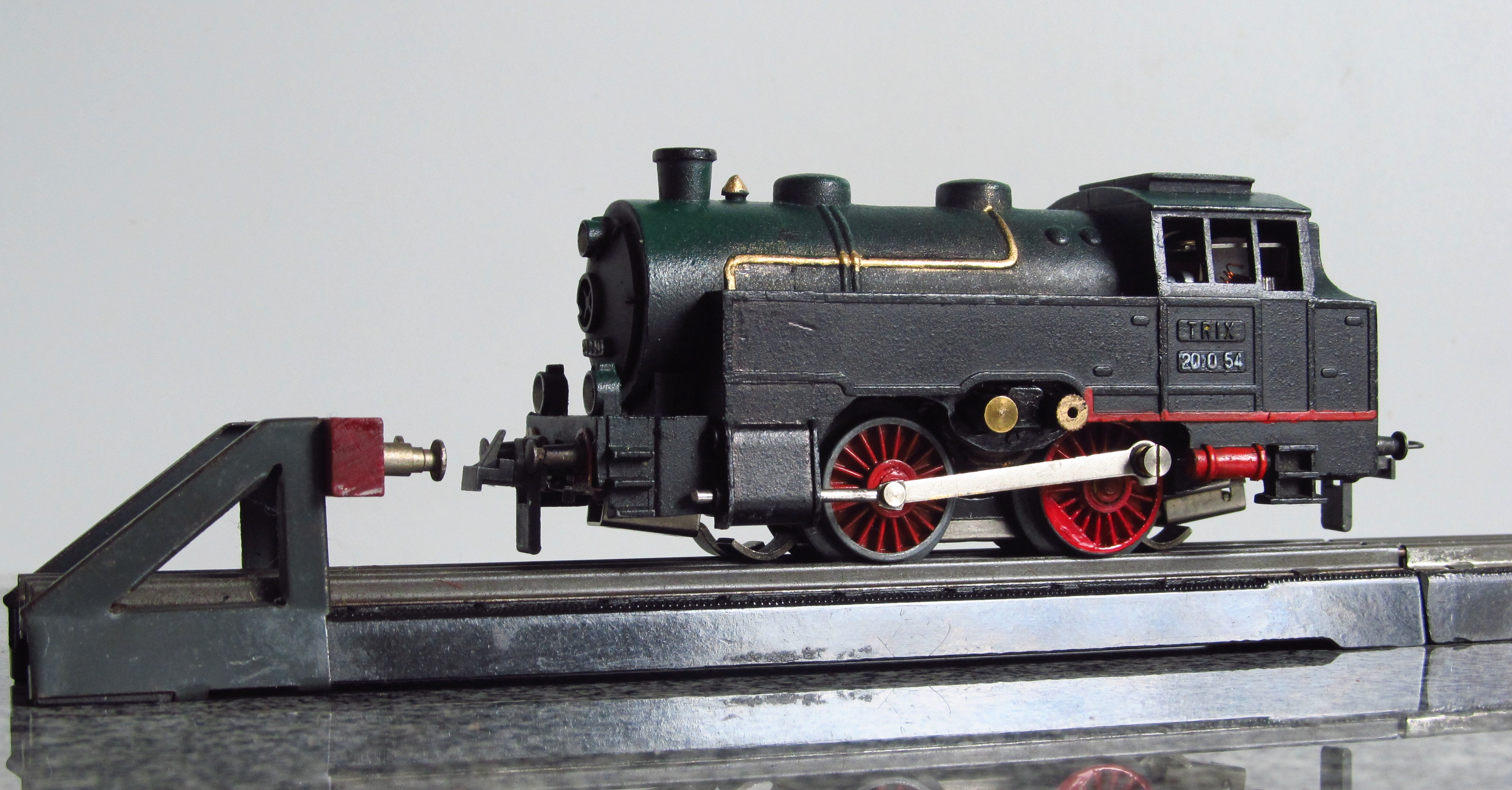
A Trix Express, AC-model BR 20/54 from 1939, on bakelite rails

Trix is a German company that originally made Trix metal construction sets. One of its co-founders was Stephan Bing, the son of the pioneer toy-maker industrialist Ignaz Bing. In 1935 the company began producing the electrically powered model trains that it became famous for, under the Trix Express label. Before World War II the company produced a small range of AC (14 V) powered three rail loco models (e.g. 20/51, 20/52, 20/53, 20/54) running on bakelite rails.

After more than six decades of independence, the TRIX company got increasingly into economic difficulties in the 1990s and was completely taken over in 1997 by the Göppingen competitor Märklin, but continued as an independent brand. Since then there has been increasing overlap between the model ranges from TRIX and Märklin in size H0. New model developments differ only in the respective power systems, with alternating current at Märklin, direct current at TRIX International.

== Trix Twin Railway ==
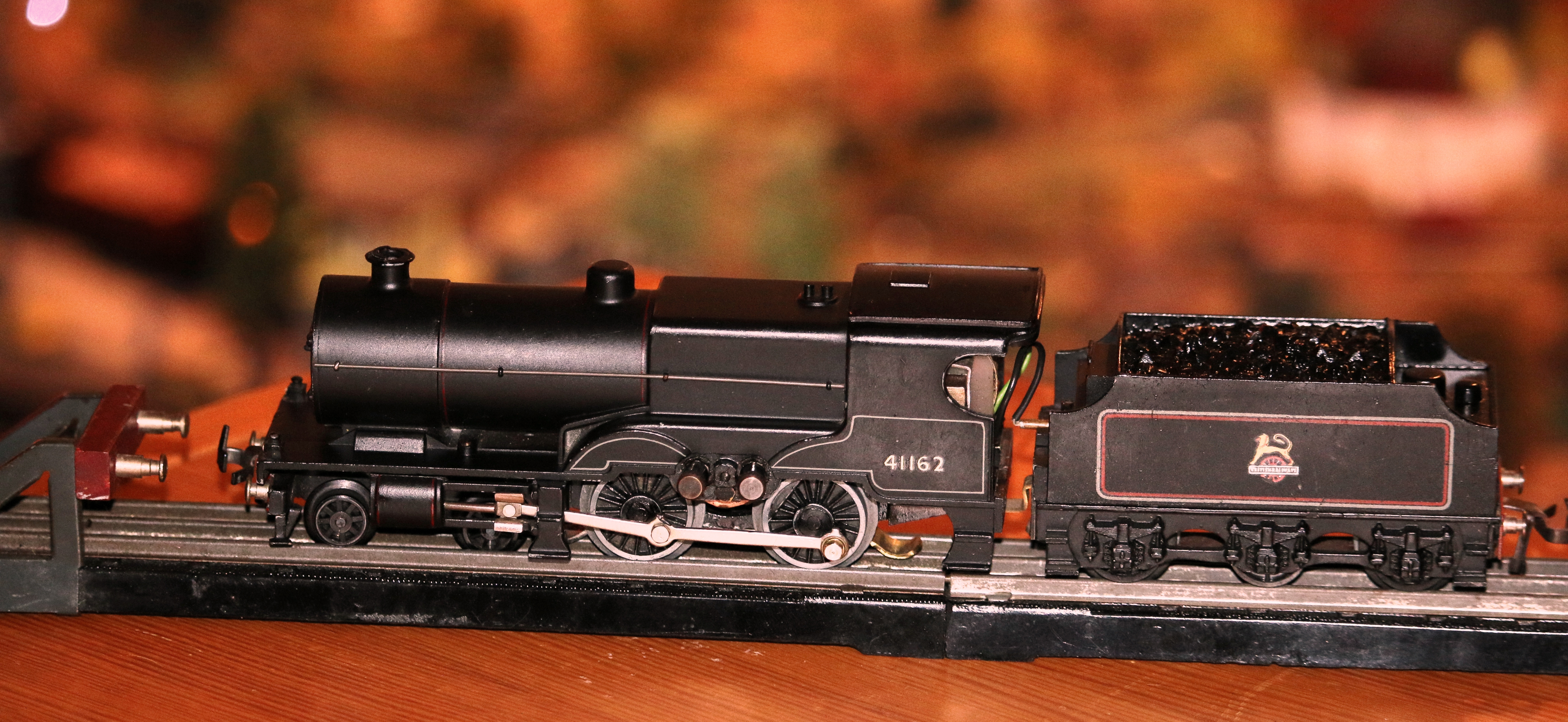
Trix Twin Railway, scale model Compound (AC), 1950

Under the name TTR (Trix Twin Railway), the TRIX Express model railway was available in England from the end of 1935. Locomotives made in Germany were repainted in England. From 1936, the locomotive bogies that were still supplied from Germany were equipped with housings in the English style.

A TRIX subsidiary in England had existed since the early 1930s and was initially responsible for sales of the metal construction kit. In 1938, the English model range was further expanded after the German company founder Stephan Bing was driven out of Germany by the Nazis. In the beginning most of the models ran with alternating current (AC).

In 1948, production resumed after the second world war, but began to lag behind the technology used by rivals. Trix switched from AC to DC, with its simple reversing function, later than rivals like Tri-ang, particularly the British Trix company. In 1956. Trix switched to DC. In 1967, Trix adopted two-rail production, as used by most competitors.

In the late 1950s, the production of plastic models began. he three-wire system was able to last there until 1967, when the international two-wire system was converted. The company then changed hands several times and at times also operated as Trix Trains and British Trix. In the 1970s, the legacy of TTR went to the British subsidiary of Liliput. Production of British Trix OO gauge trains ceased in 1973.

== Minitrix ==
A Minitrix ICE model

N gauge models under the Minitrix brand were made from the late 1960s mostly of European trains, primarily German and British. North American trains were manufactured and marketed under the Aurora "Postage Stamp" brand. Later these items were sold under the American Tortoise, Model Power and Con-Cor brands.

Trix sometimes utilized North American consultants to aid in the design of this portion of the product line. The "Hornby Minitrix' brand was used in the 1980s for a short lived range of British models using the earlier product tooling.

== Ownership ==
Trix's owner in the 1980s and 1990s was Mangold, which went bankrupt in the late 1990s. In January 1997, Märklin purchased the assets. In part, this purchase was a reflection of Märklin's need for added production capacity. Trix had already been manufacturing certain items for Märklin. The purchase was also in response to the earlier purchase of the Karl Arnold company by the Italian company Rivarossi.

Märklin were very keen to take over Trix market share in 2-rail H0 and especially Minitrix. Until then, Märklin had not marketed N gauge models. In 2003, Märklin introduced its first N gauge models under the well established Minitrix brand. A number of Märklin H0 scale three-rail AC locomotives have been introduced in two-rail DC versions under the Trix logo. Many models are shared between the two brands.

Since around 2003 or 2004, Trix has made a two-rail version of the Märklin C-track. The two are mostly identical except for the colour of the trackbed and the height of the rails, with Märklin being 2,3 mm high and Trix 2,1 mm. Some of Märklin's digital components, such as the Mobile Station, are made in Trix versions with different colours and another logo; but otherwise identical and fully compatible with Märklin's. For a number of years Trix has made two-rail versions of many Märklin models with only minor differences, such as electrically insulated axles and for powered models (being of lighting and/or a motor) power pickup.

== Other Trix brands ==
Besides the AC Trix Express and Minitrix brands, the Trix company is well known for its 1:87 scale DC brands, Trix International and Trix H0, dating back at least to the early 1970s and still being produced today.

== Bavarian prototypes ==
A particular Trix speciality is the reproduction of Bavarian models from Epoch I and their equivalent Epoch II, DRG versions. Examples such as the B VI (BR 34), D XI (BR 98^{4-5}), D XII (BR 73), G 3/4 H (BR 54), Gt 2x4/4 (BR 96), P 3/5 H (BR 38^{4}), PtL 2/2 (BR 98^{3}) and S 3/6 (BR 18^{4}) have been produced in the steam locomotive line, along with numerous passenger and goods wagons.

== Brass models ==
Trix also produced highly detailed brass models of steam locomotives in limited quantities under the "Fine Art" label, predominantly in the late 1990s.

== Gallery ==
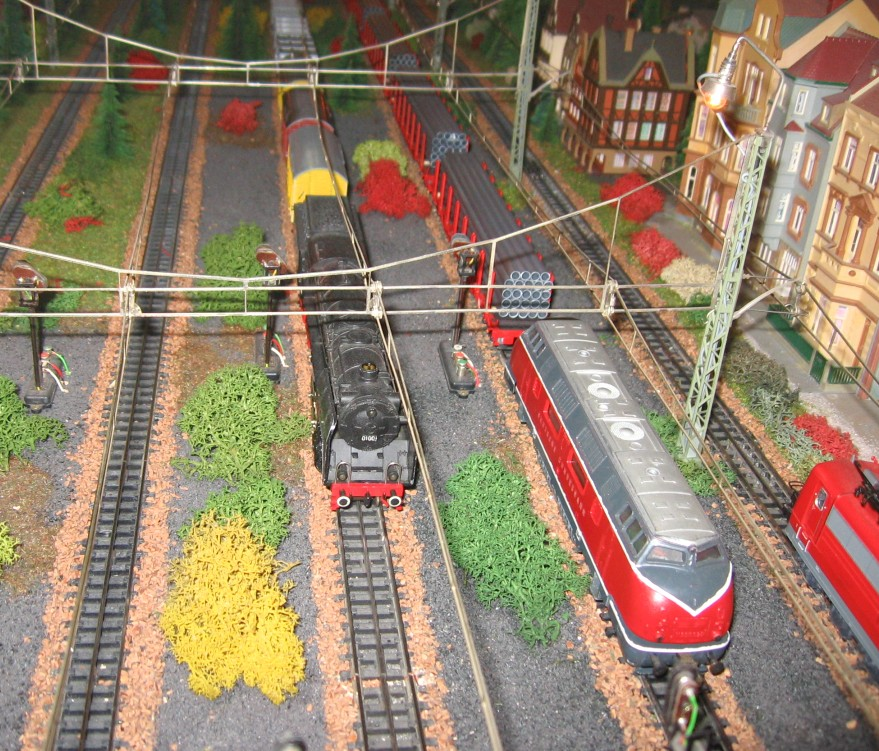

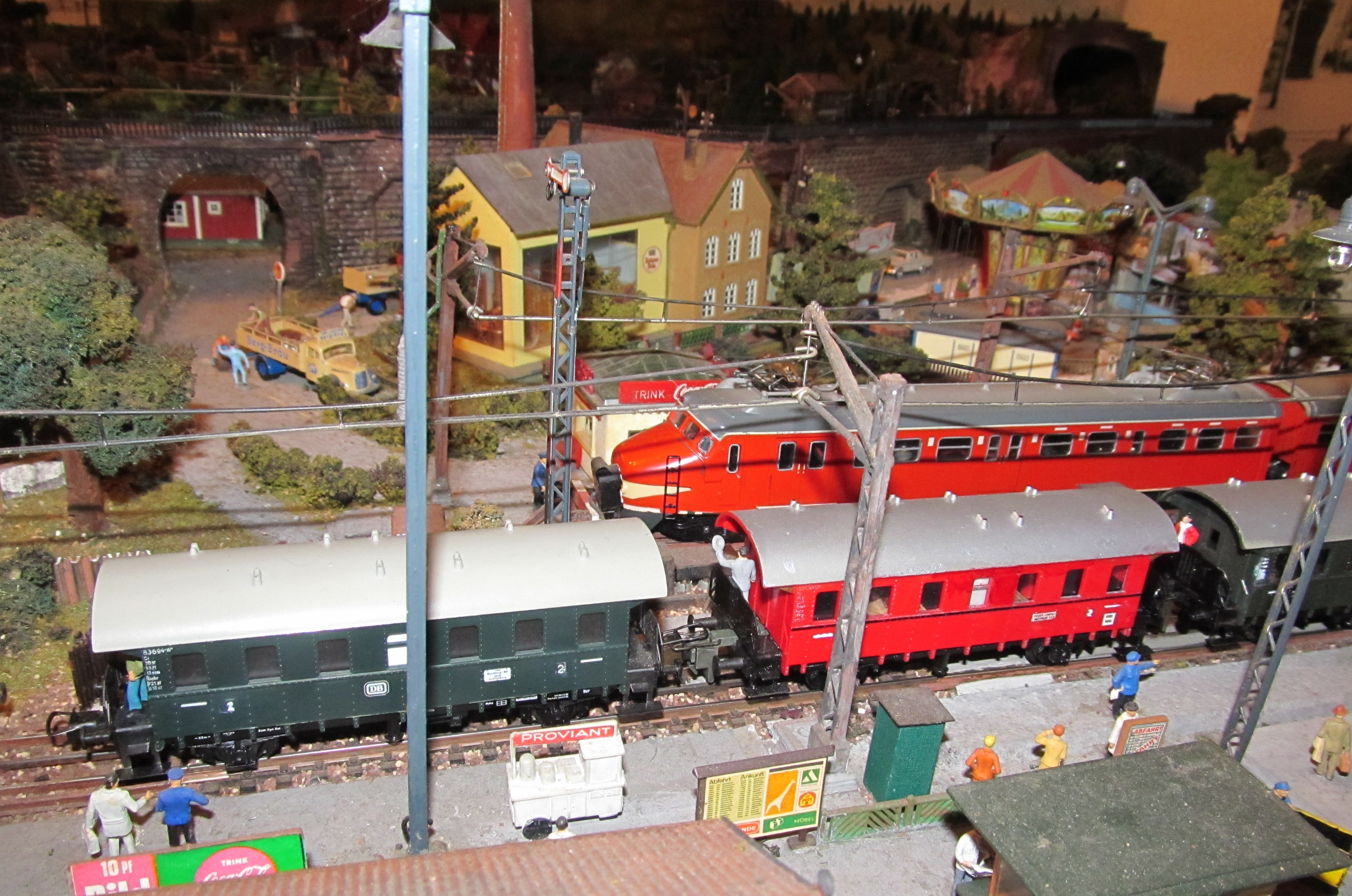

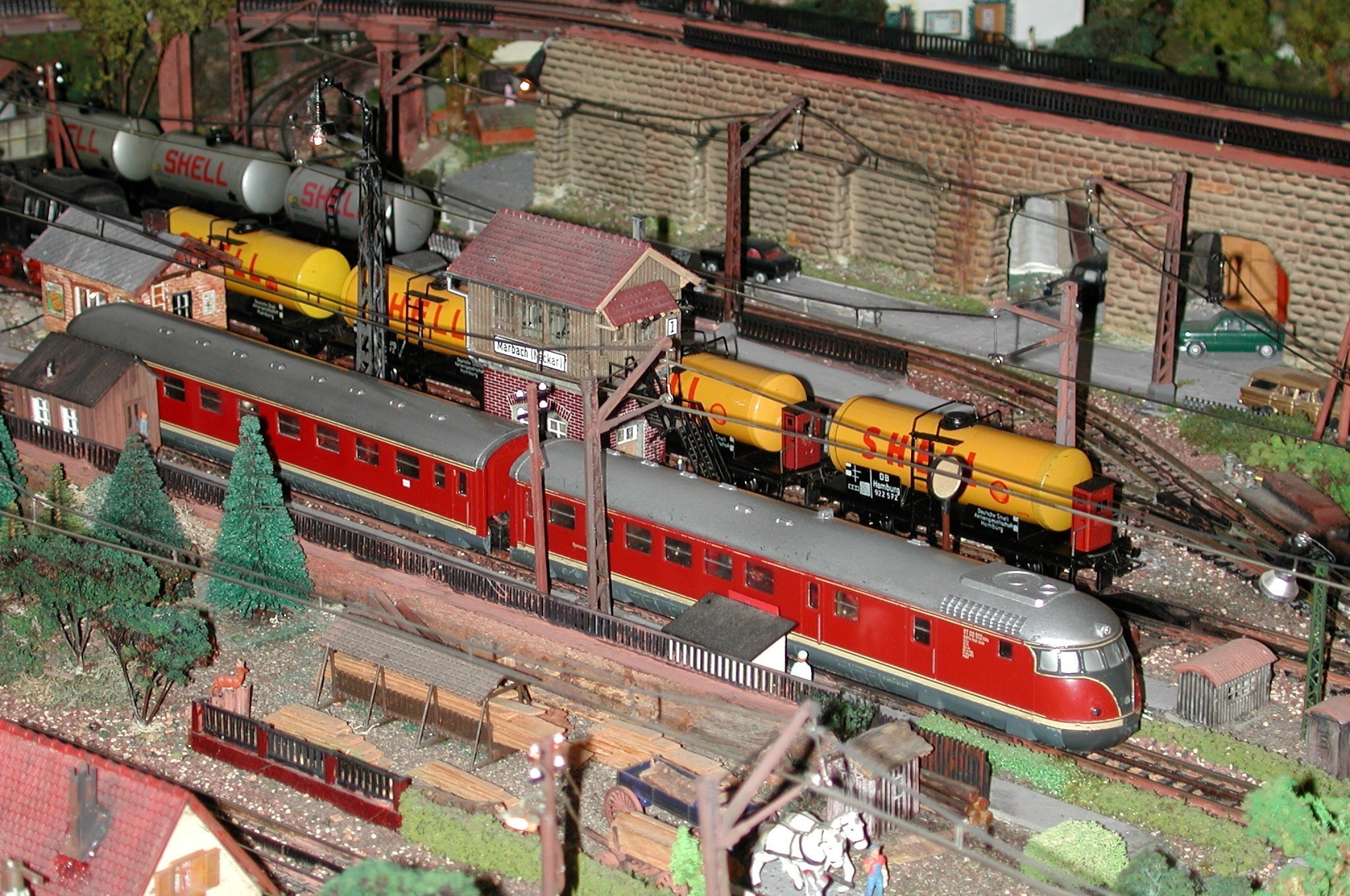

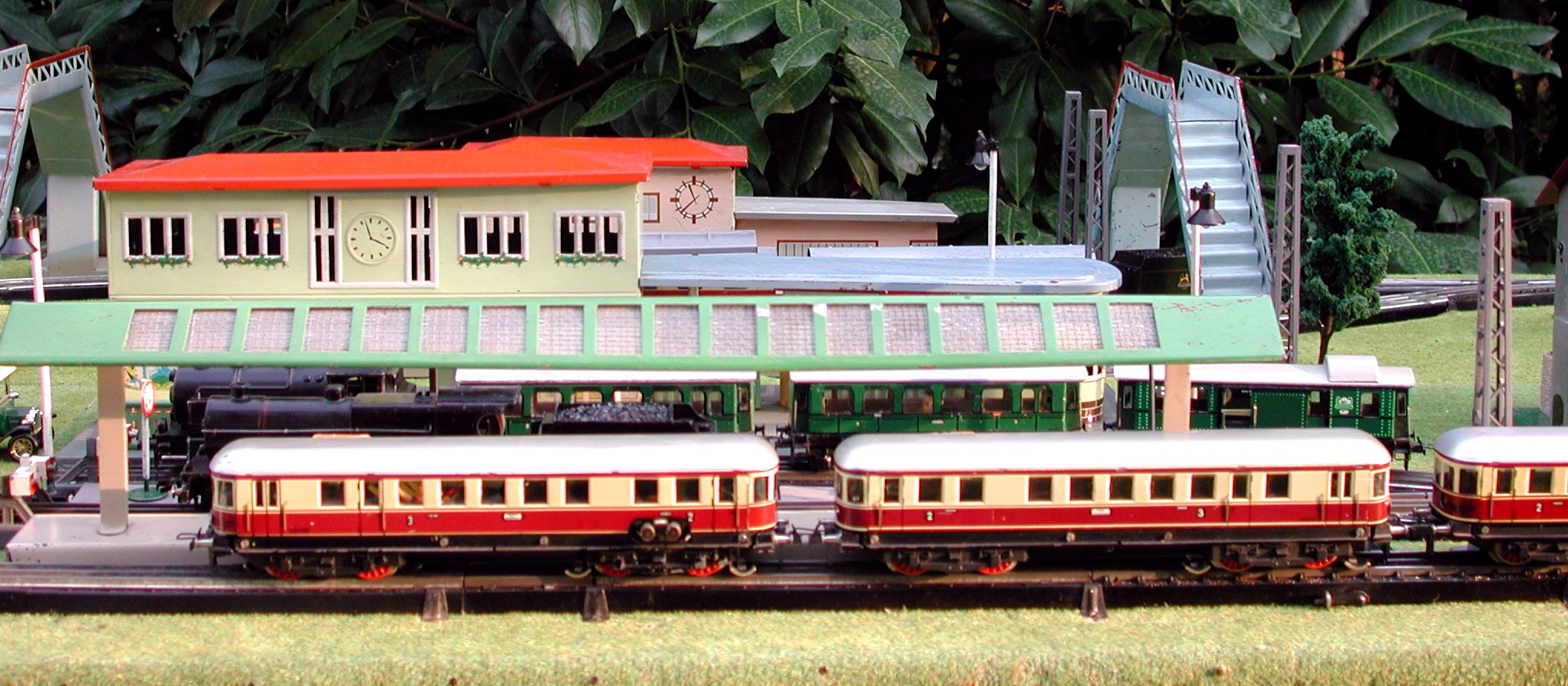

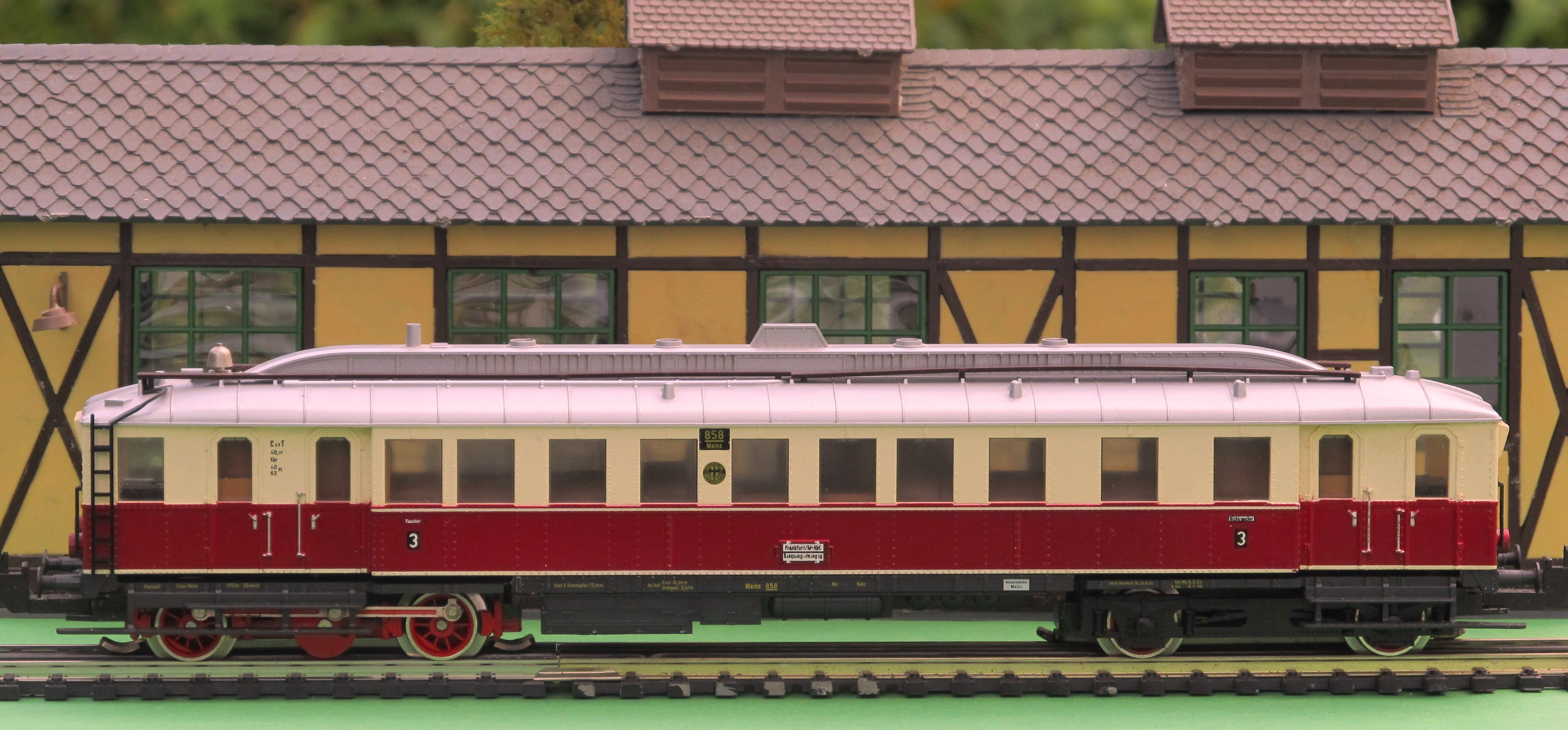

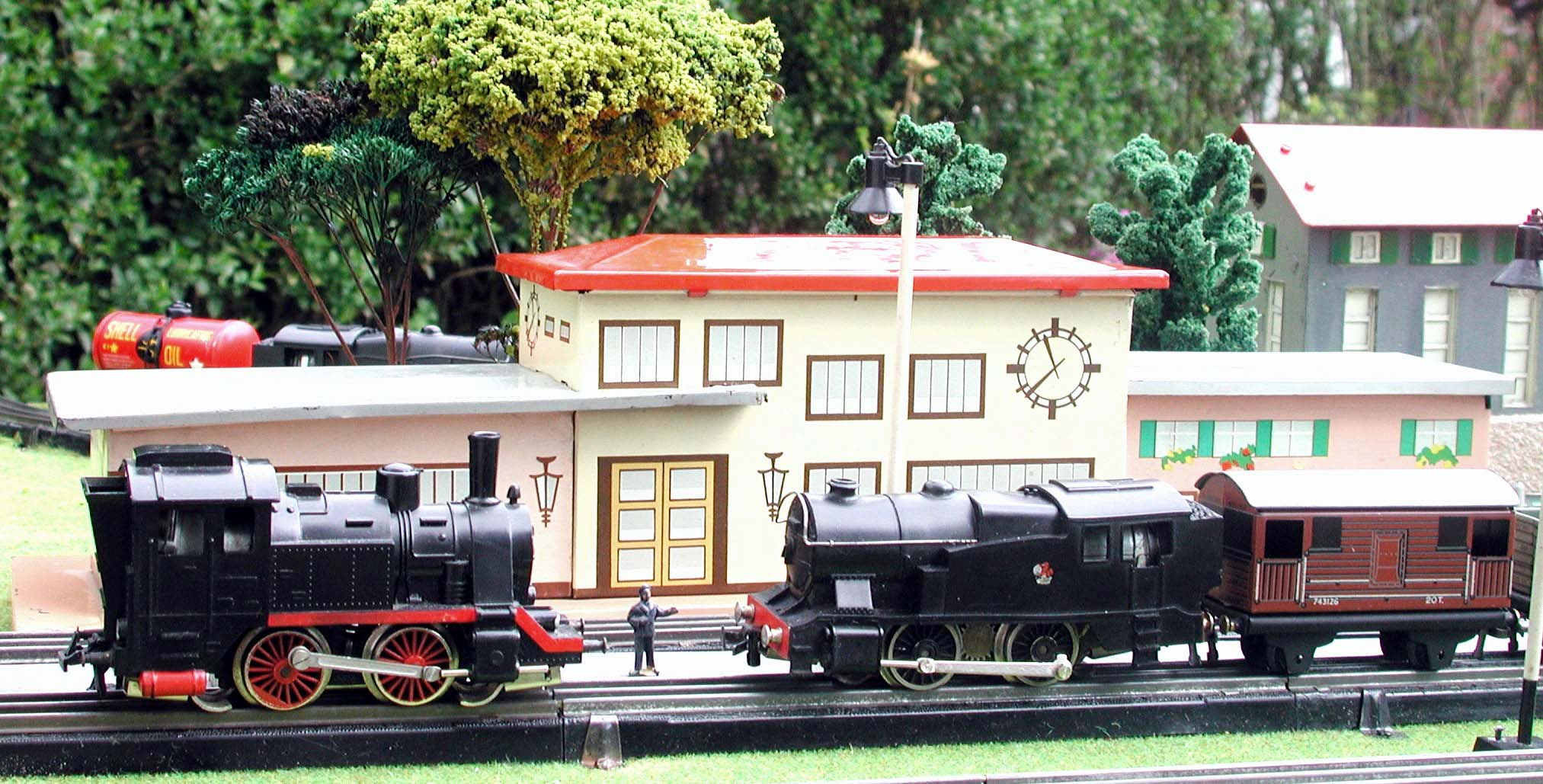

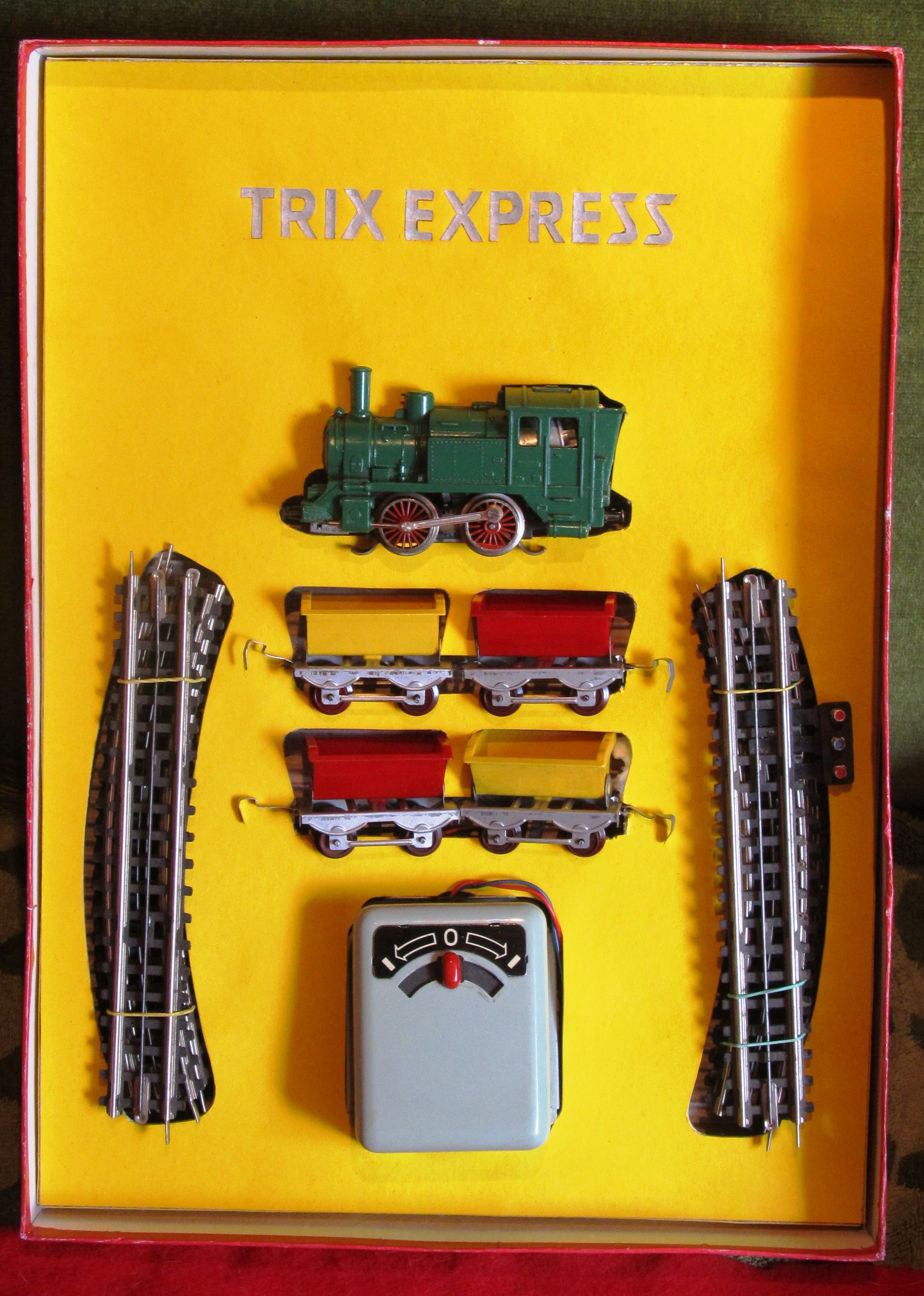

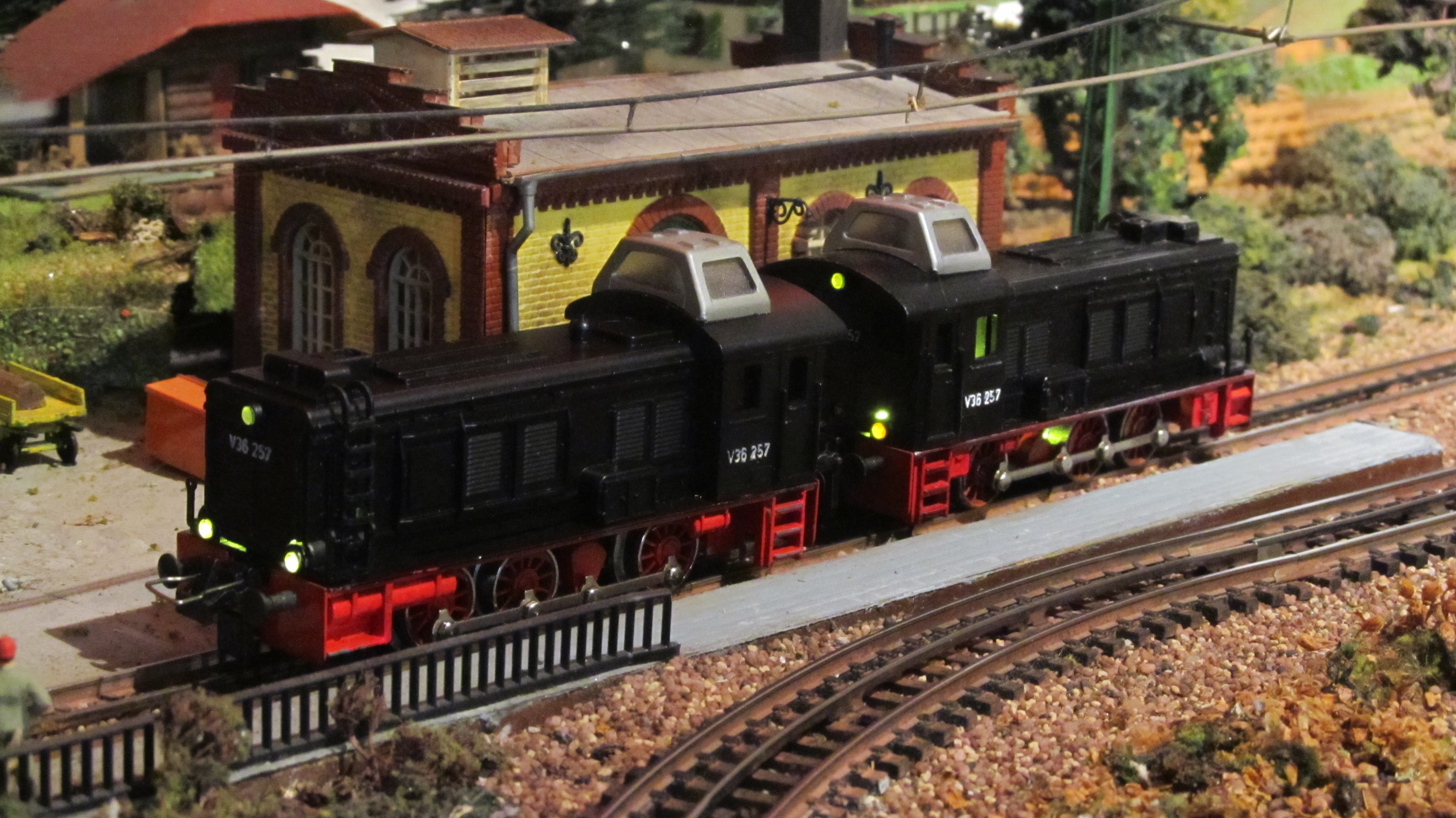

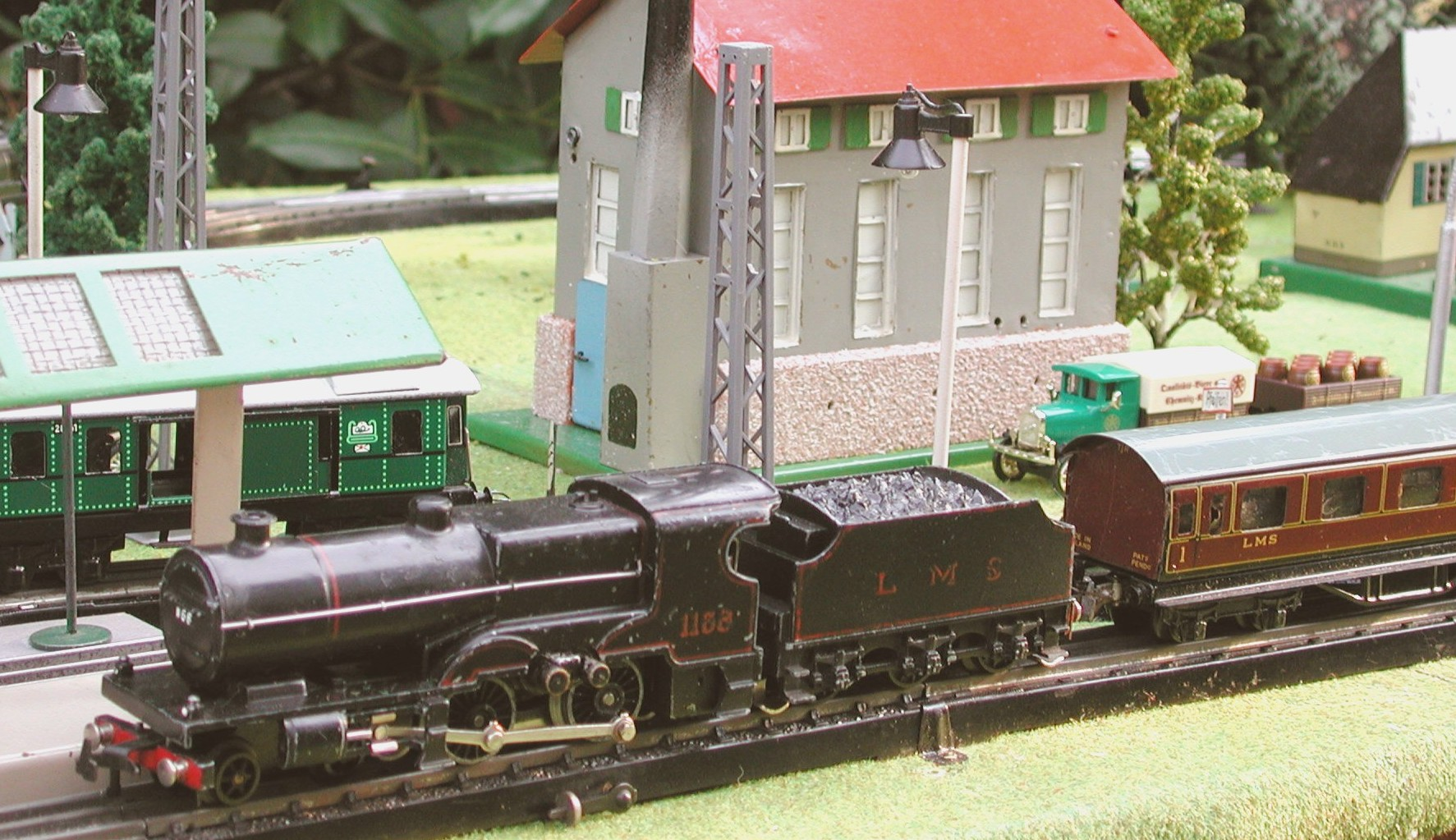

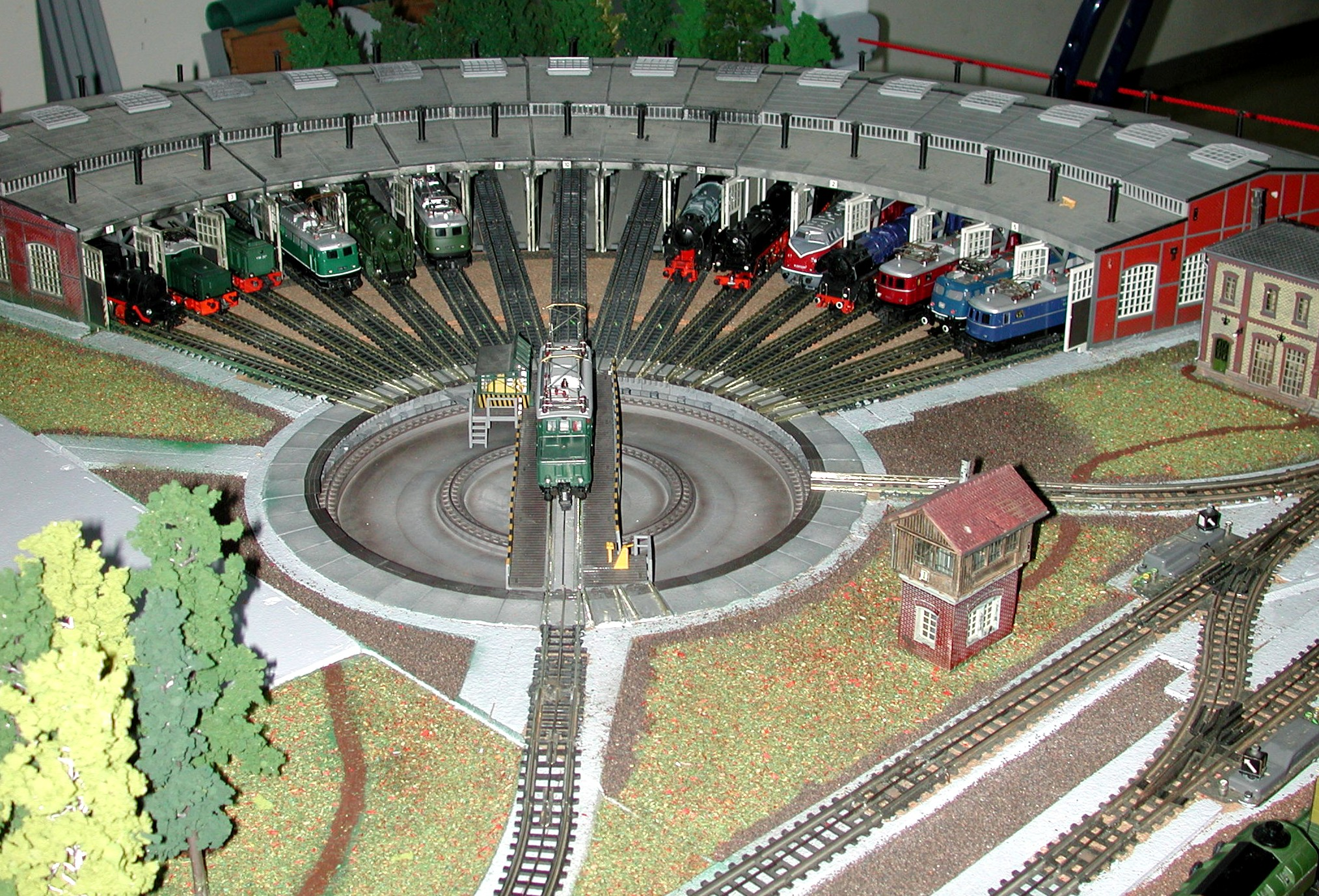

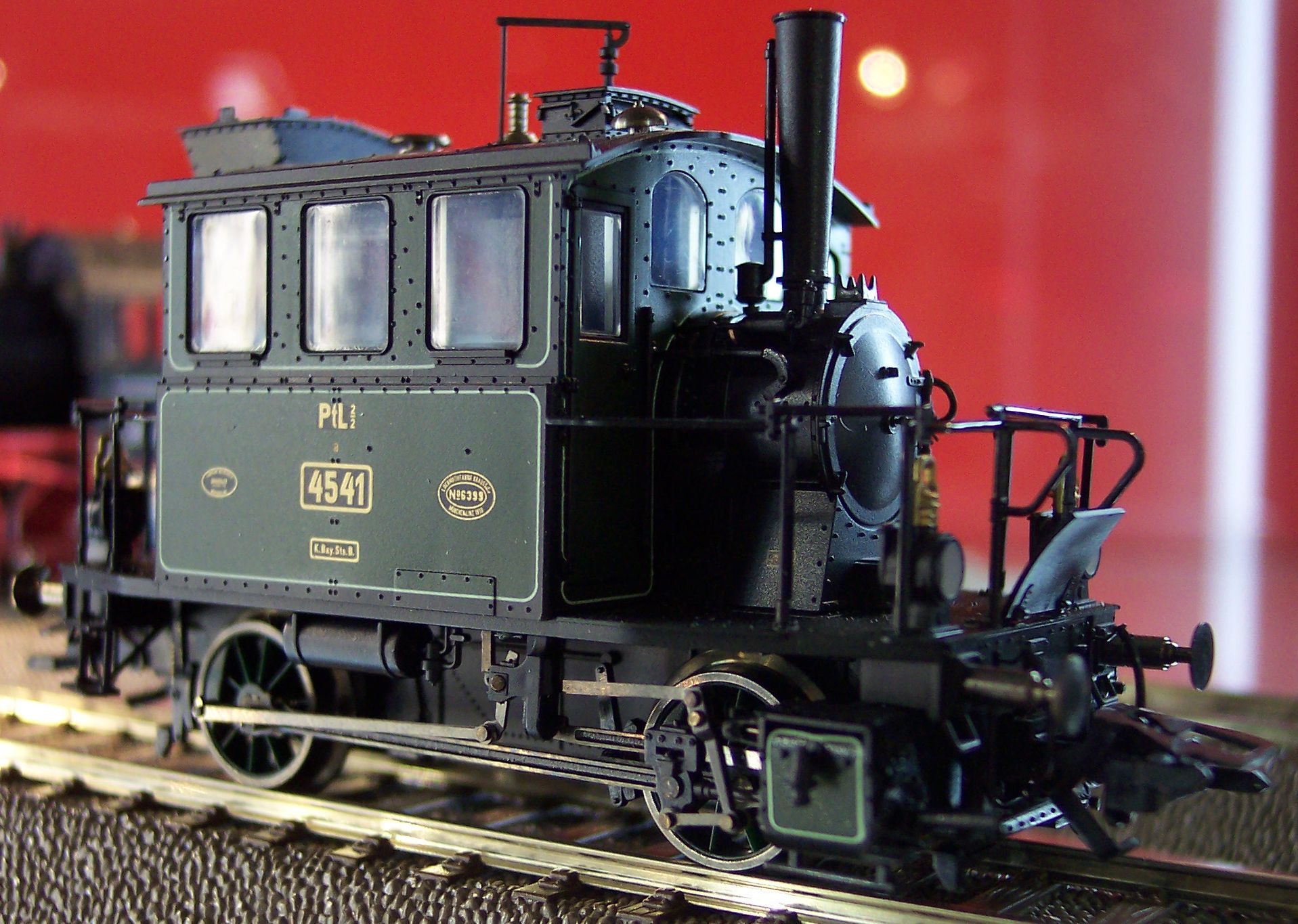

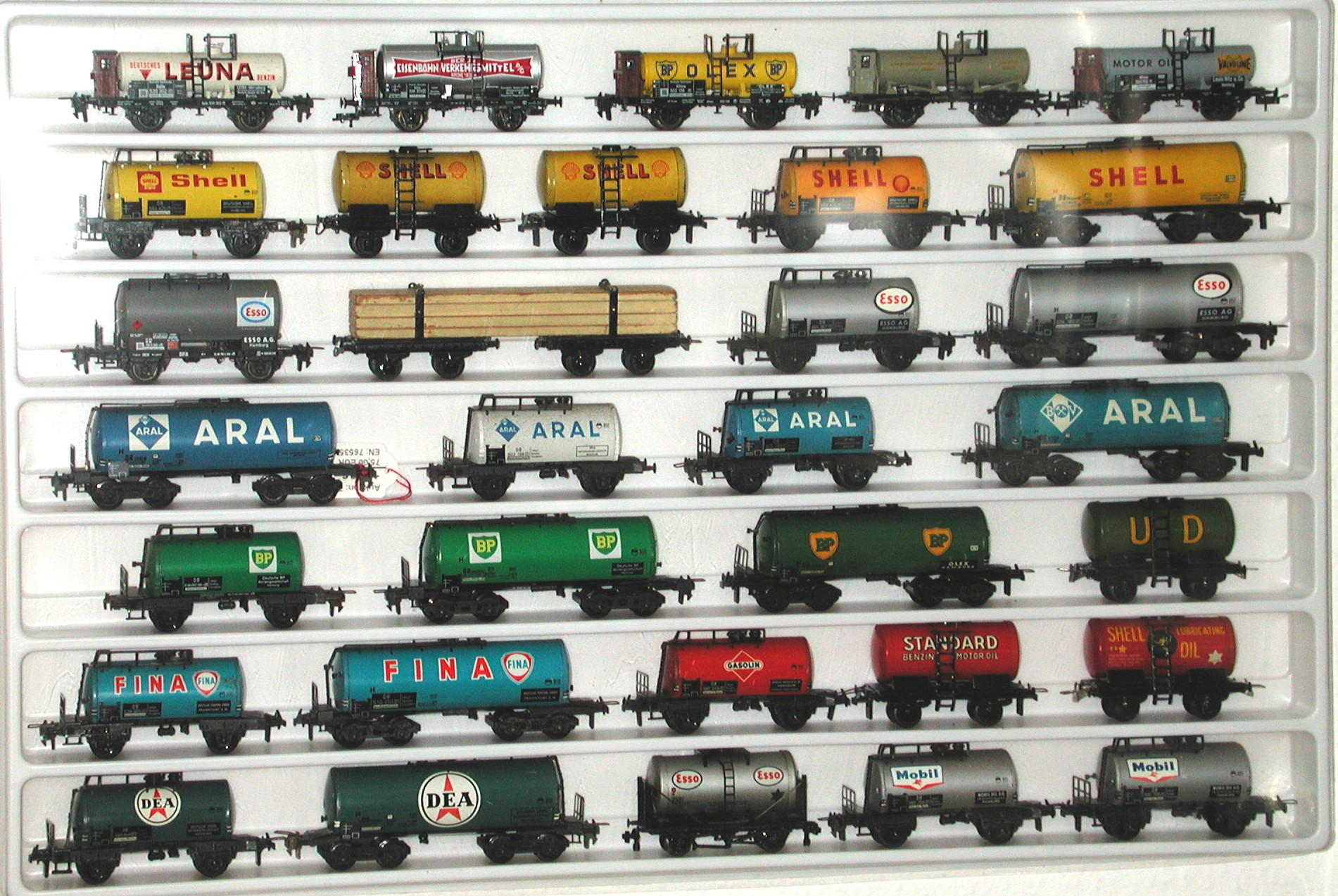

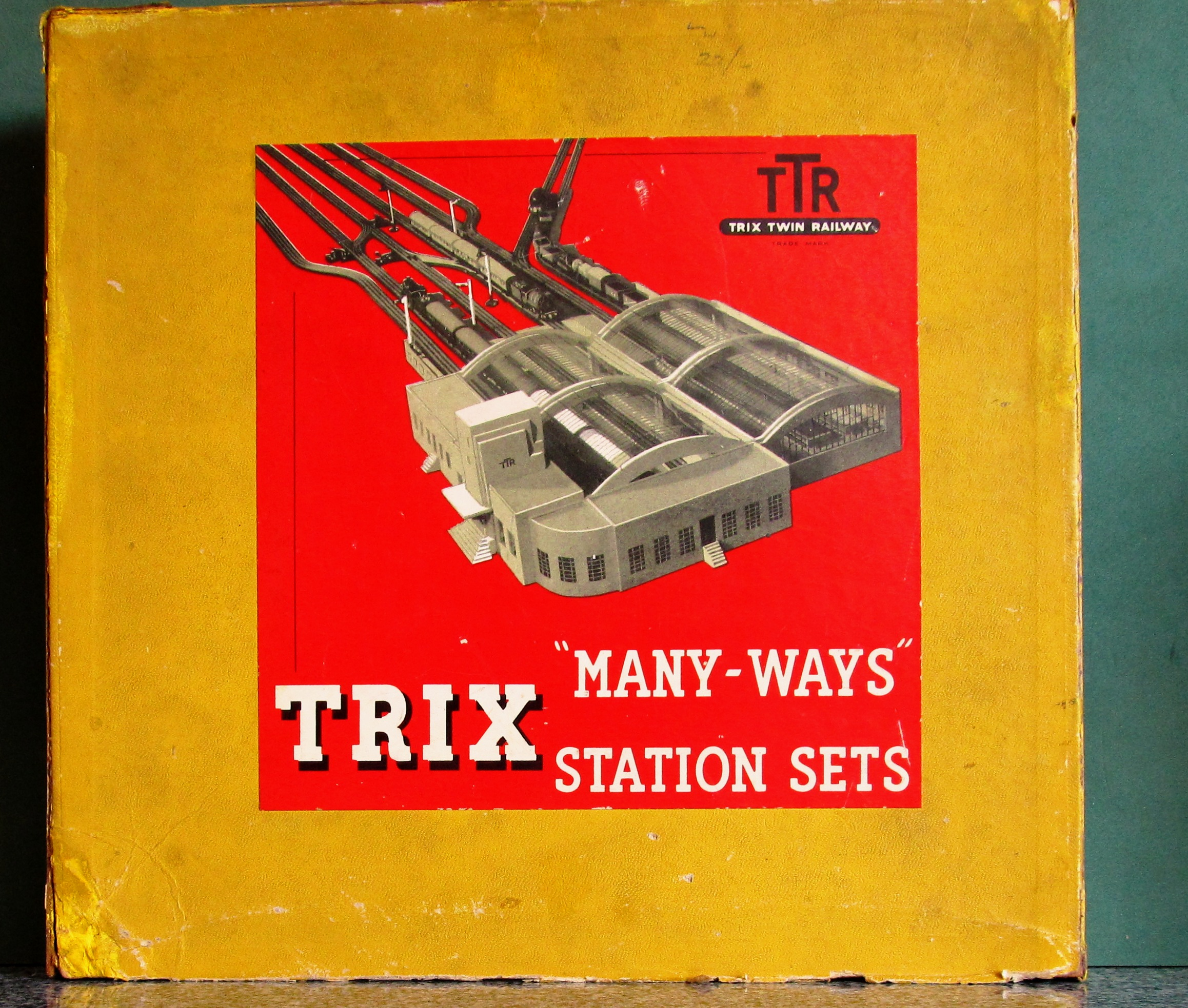

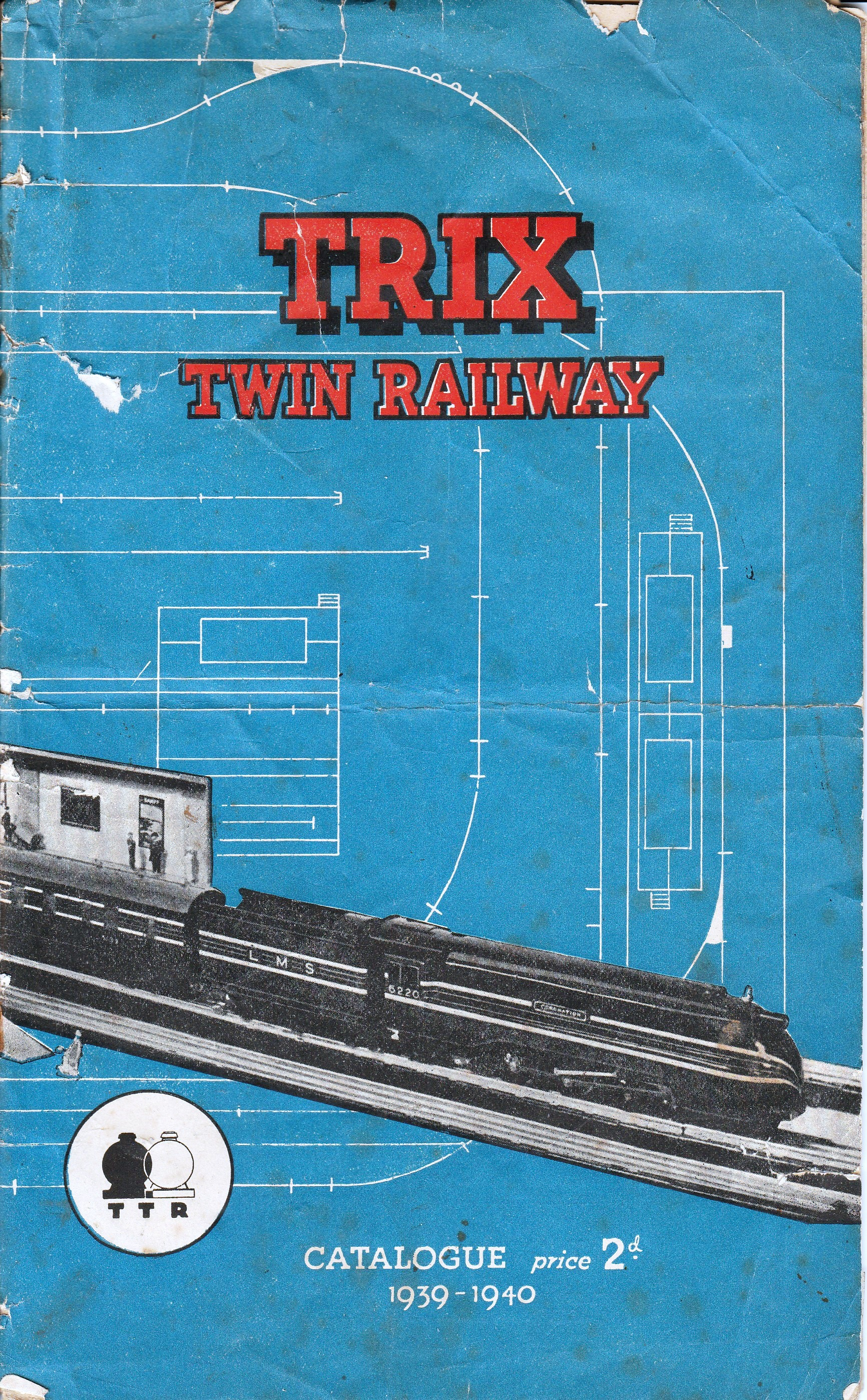
A TTR Catalog 1939/40, title page

== Literature ==
- P. Berg: Trix Express – Die Vorkriegszeit 1935–1940. (= Tischeisenbahnen. Band 2). 2005, ISBN 3-933899-25-7.
- T. Matthewman: The history of TRIX – H0/00 model railways in Britain. 1994, ISBN 0-904568-76-8.
