= Märklin =

German toy company

Gebr. Märklin & Cie. GmbH

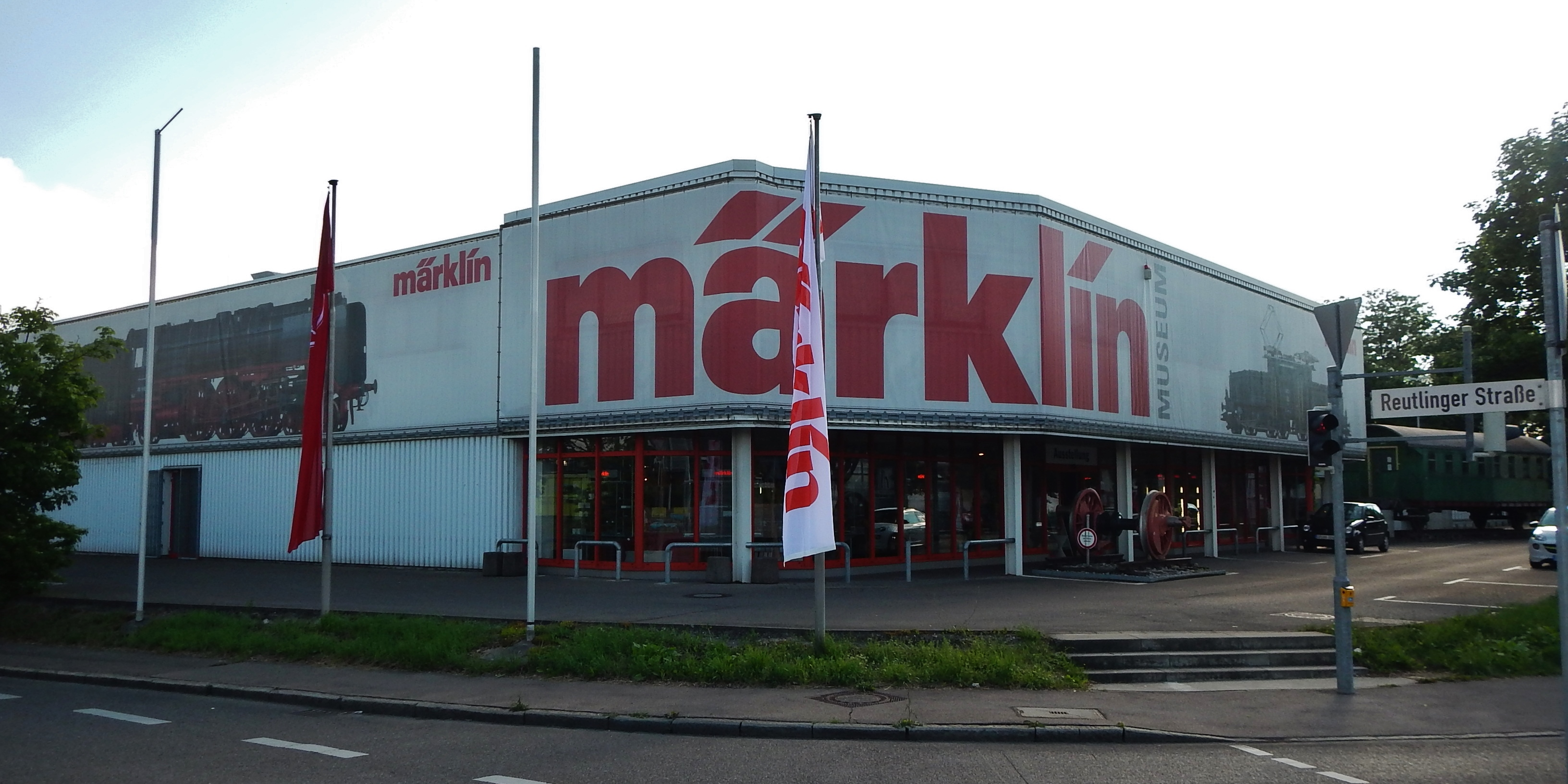
- Märklin Museum in Göppingen
- Type: Private
- Founded: 1859; 167 years ago
- Headquarters: Göppingen, Germany
- Key people: Theodor Friedrich Wilhelm Märklin (founder), Caroline Märklin, Eugen Märklin, Karl Märklin
- Products: Toys, model railway products
- Parent: Simba Dickie Group
- Website: http://www.maerklin.com/

Gebr. Märklin & Cie. GmbH or Märklin (stylized as ma̋rklín) (MÄRKLIN or MAERKLIN in capital letters) is a German toy company. The company was founded in 1859 and is based at Göppingen in Baden-Württemberg. Although it originally specialised in doll house accessories, today it is best known for model railways and technical toys. In some parts of Germany and in Sweden, the company's name is almost synonymous with model railways.

== History ==
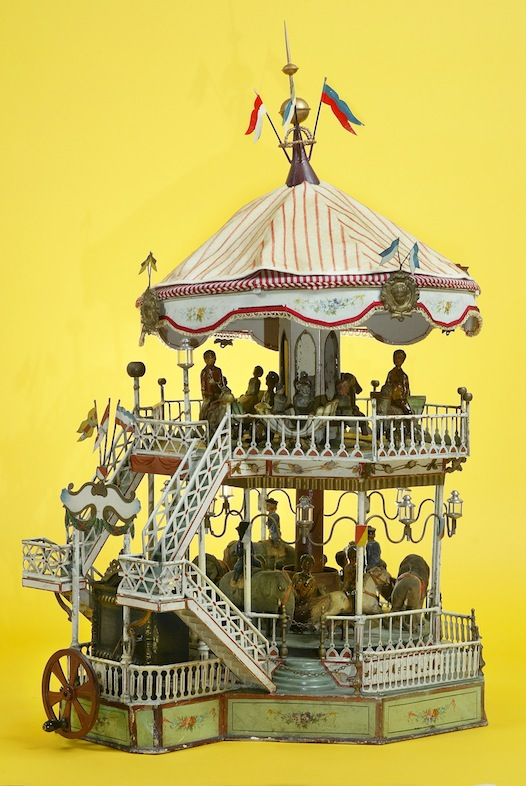
A carousel made by the company in 1911, from the collection of the Children's Museum of Indianapolis

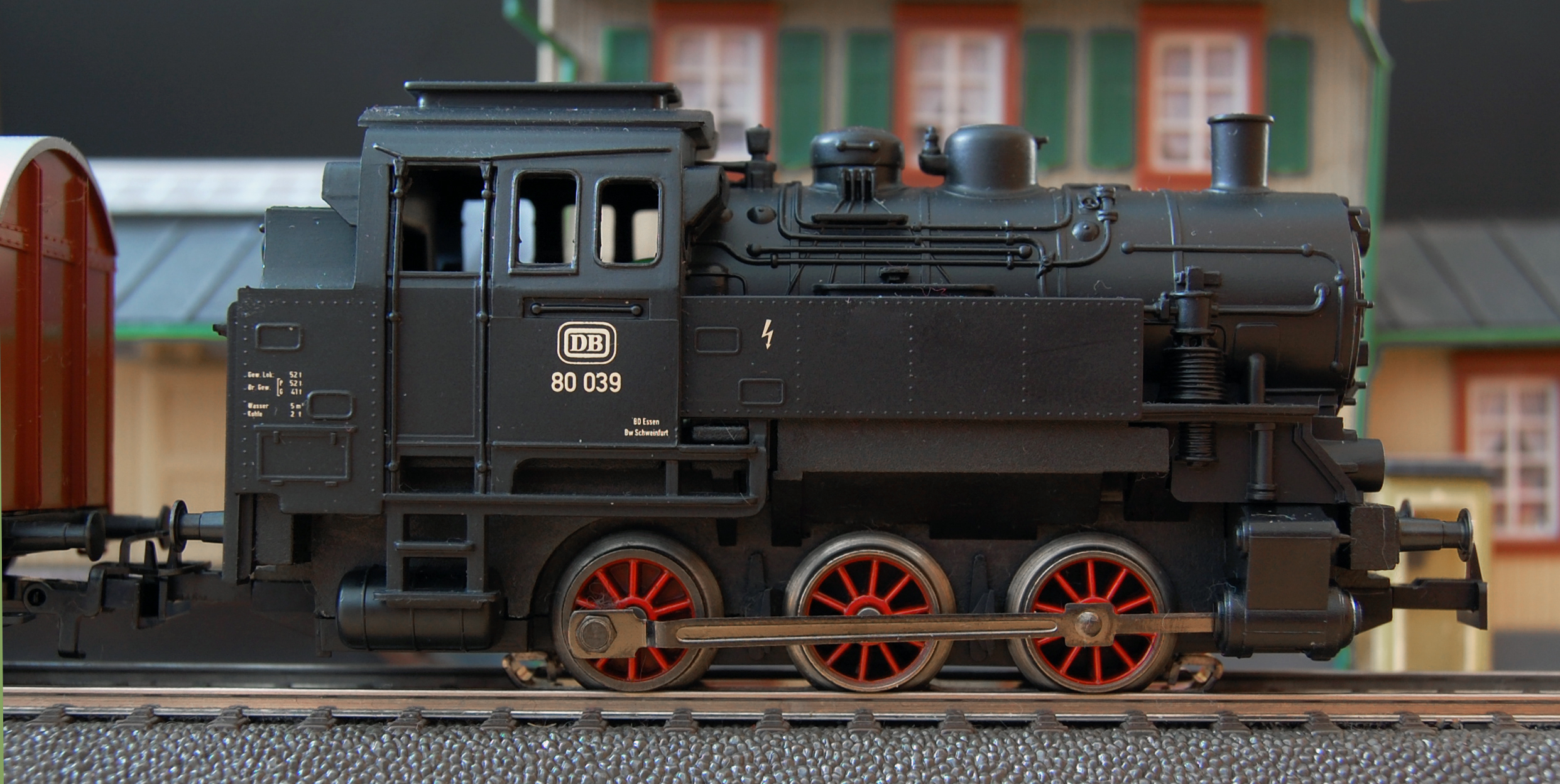
A simple Märklin model

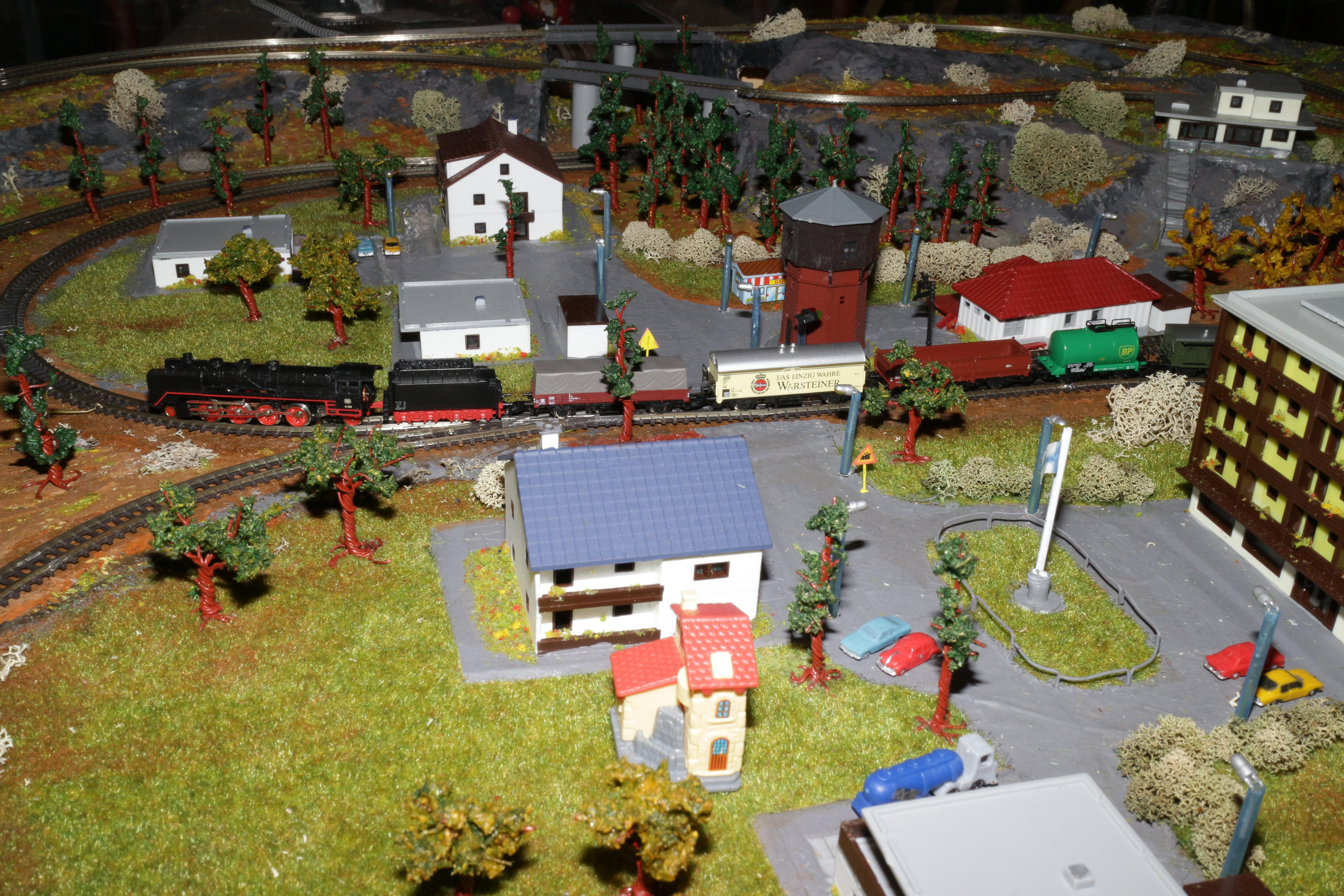
A coffee-table Märklin layout in Z scale (1:220). The locomotive is about 50 mm long.

Märklin model steam engine in function.

Märklin was founded by Theodor Friedrich Wilhelm Märklin in 1859. After his death in 1866, early in the company's life, his wife Caroline Märklin lead the business until 1888.

Eugen Märklin and Karl Märklin took over the company from her, and Märklin released its first wind-up train with carriages that ran on standardised track in 1891, noting that railway toys had the potential to follow the common practice of doll's houses, in which the initial purchase would be enhanced and expanded with more accessories for years after the initial purchase. To this end, Märklin offered additional rolling stock and track with which to expand its boxed sets.

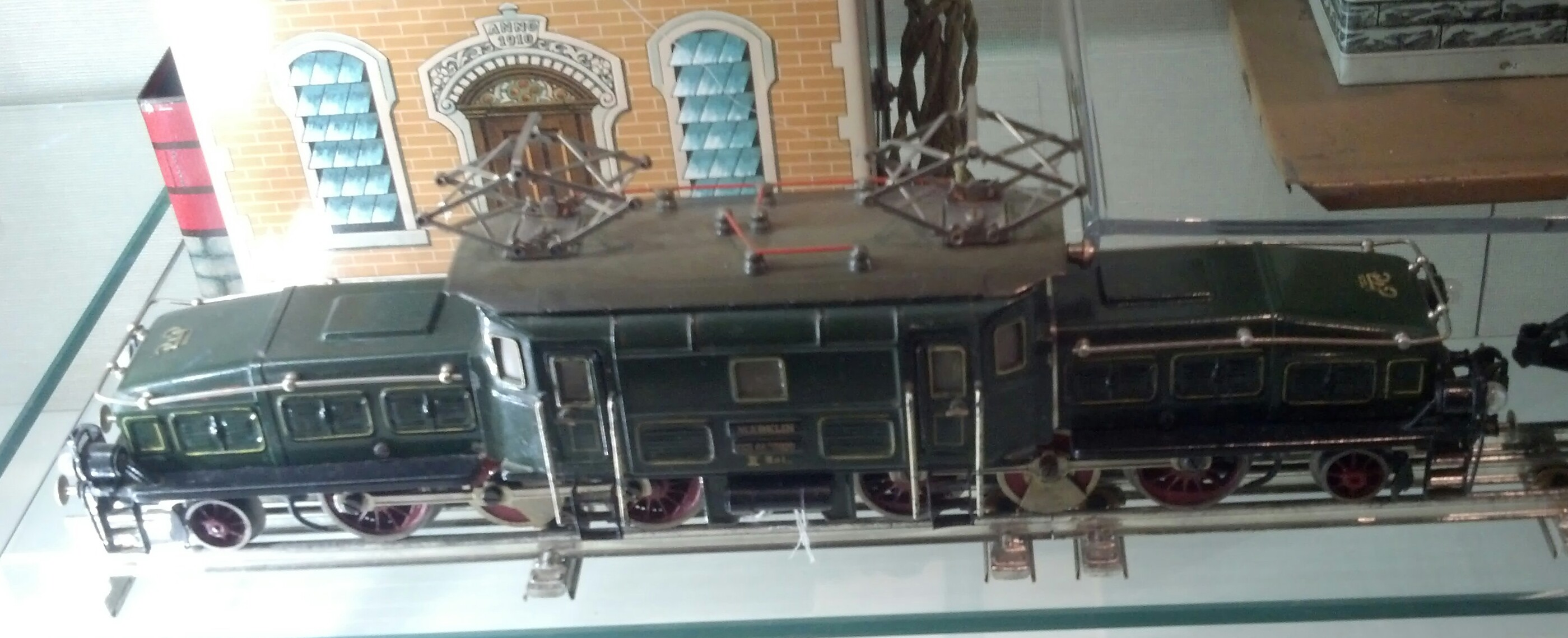
Märklin O-gauge Crocodile locomotive ca. 1920s - 1930s, in the collection of the California State Railroad Museum

Märklin is responsible for the creation of several popular model railway gauges or scale, noteworthy exceptions being N scale and Wide gauge. In 1891, Märklin defined gauges 1-5 as standards for toy trains and presented them at the Leipzig Toy Fair. They soon became international standards. Märklin followed with O gauge (by some accounts as early as 1895 or as late as 1901), H0 scale in 1935, and the diminutive Z scale, 1:220, in 1972 — smallest in the world for decades — under the name Mini-Club (the scale of Z was assigned after the product line was introduced). Mini-Club was developed as Märklin's answer to Arnold Rapido's introduction of N gauge.

Today, Märklin manufactures and markets trains and accessories in Gauge 1, H0 scale, and Z scale. In 1994 Märklin acquired the Nuremberg based model train manufacturer Trix producing DC-operated H0 and N scale. Märklin's older trains are considered highly collectible, and Märklin's current offerings enjoy premium status among hobbyists.

Although Märklin is best known for its trains, from 1914 to 1999, the company produced mechanical construction sets similar to Meccano and Erector. Between 1967 and 1982, the company produced a slotcar system called Märklin Sprint. Märklin also produced numerous other toys over the years, including lithographed tinplate toy automobiles and boats. From 1909 until well into the 1950s they sold a range of alcohol-burning model steam engines. These were very educational toys, and could be linked to dynamos to provide lighting. In the late 1990s, Märklin purchased the assets of Trix in January 1997, thus adding N gauge to their scale lineup.

On 11 May 2006, the company, which had until then been owned by the three families Märklin, Friz and Safft, was sold to the British investment group Kingsbridge Capital, with the support of the employees. The purchase price was approximately $38 million. At the time, Märklin had approximately $70.5 million in debt, as a result of several years of slumping sales.

In 2007, the company expanded its product offering by buying the remaining assets of the bankrupt firm, Ernst Paul Lehmann Patentwerk, who owned the LGB brand and product line of G scale model railways.

On 4 February 2009 Märklin filed for insolvency at the Göppingen municipal court. A year and a day later, on 5 February 2010, Märklin announced a return to profitability.

In 2013 Märklin was acquired by the Simba Dickie Group.

On July 22, 2013 the managing director Stefan Löbich left Märklin.

During the 2020-2021 COVID pandemic, Märklin saw an upswing in sales, leading to shortages of parts such as rails, and even found they had to hire new employees and apprentices to meet the demand.

== The Märklin System ==
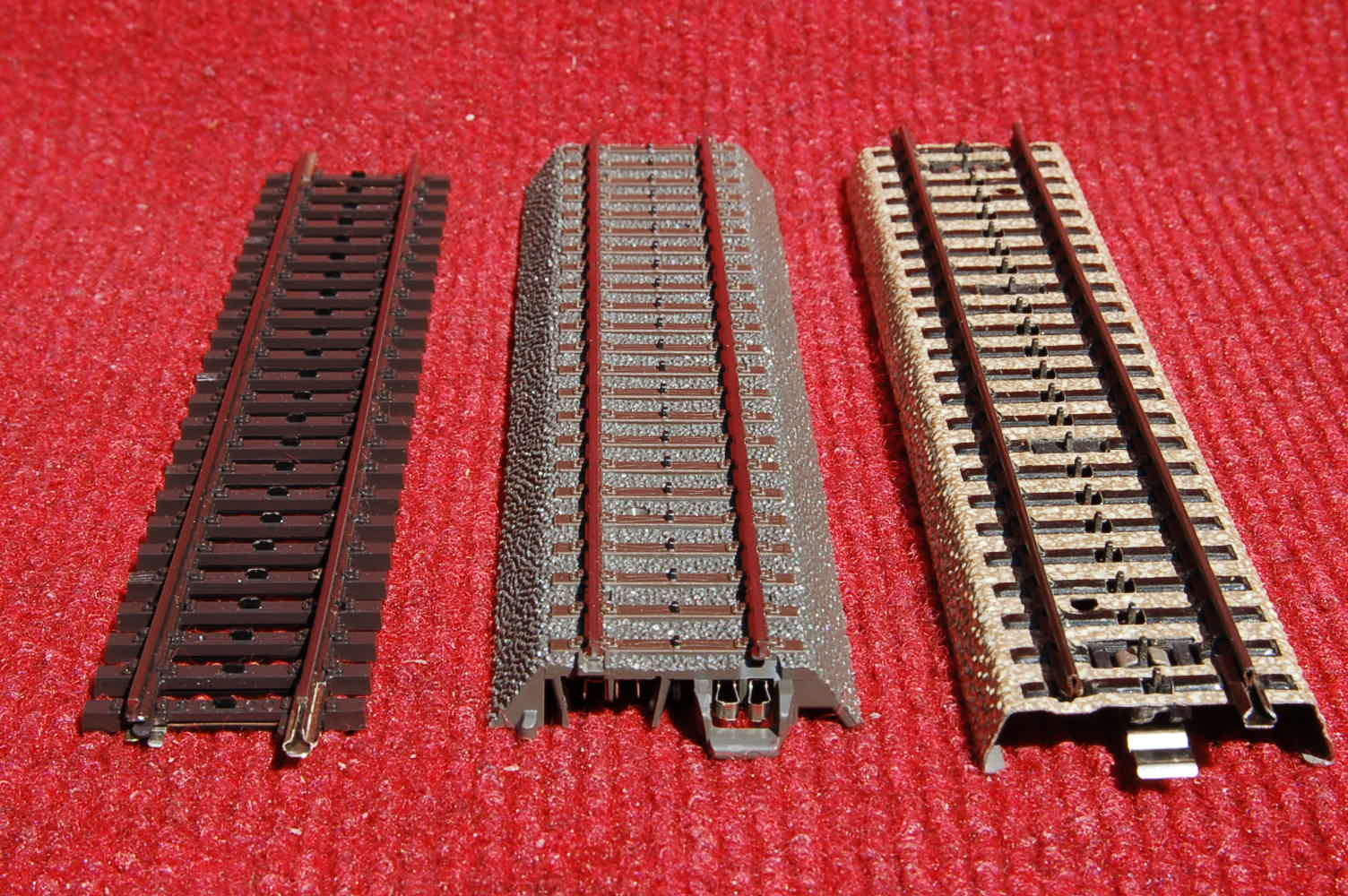
Märklin system with contact studs located in the middle of the tracks

The Märklin system is the technique of using a third rail concealed in the roadbed with only small studs protruding through the ties of the track. The two outer rails are connected electrically. This provides the simplified wiring enjoyed by larger gauges—such as for reverse loops—without seriously detracting from the realism of the track because only two of the rails are visible. Because the two outer rails are not electrically isolated from each other, however, some do not consider Märklin's system to be a true three-rail system. However, older sections of 'M-Track' do have an actual conductor rail rather than studs. This older system is compatible with newer trains, although the reduced clearance for the pick-up shoe can sometimes cause running difficulties.

The Märklin system has some incompatibility with other manufacturers' H0 trains. Because the wheels on Märklin's cars are not insulated, it causes shorts if its cars are used on other manufacturers' H0 track without changing the wheels. The profile of the wheels are also different (see also NEM 340). Additionally, for many years Märklin was the only brand that used AC for its H0 scale trains, although in the 60s Fleischmann, HAG, Röwa, Roco and others started producing trains for the Märklin system. Some people convert Märklin locomotives to DC for use on DC layouts, and by buying HAMO, Märklin had begun offering a line of DC locomotives as well, first under the name of HAMO and, after buying Trix, under that name.

=== Märklin Digital ===
Märklin was among the early model railway companies to introduce a digital train-control system. The Märklin Digital system for Märklin's 3-rail AC train layouts was introduced in 1984 using Motorola microchips. A few years later the system developed jointly by Märklin, Lenz GmbH and Arnold GmbH was introduced for 2-rail DC locomotives. The system was used by Arnold in their N scale locomotives. While the first digital Z locomotives were announced in the late 1990s, the plans were cancelled rapidly due to heat dissipation problems in small locomotives. This digital control system was later developed into DCC (Digital Command Control). Märklin's digital system for 3 rail track is not directly compatible with DCC (Digital Command Control) although the systems are electrically compatible and many controllers can work both systems. Today Märklin offers DCC compatible locomotives for its 2-rail DC Trix brand.

== Products and collectibles ==
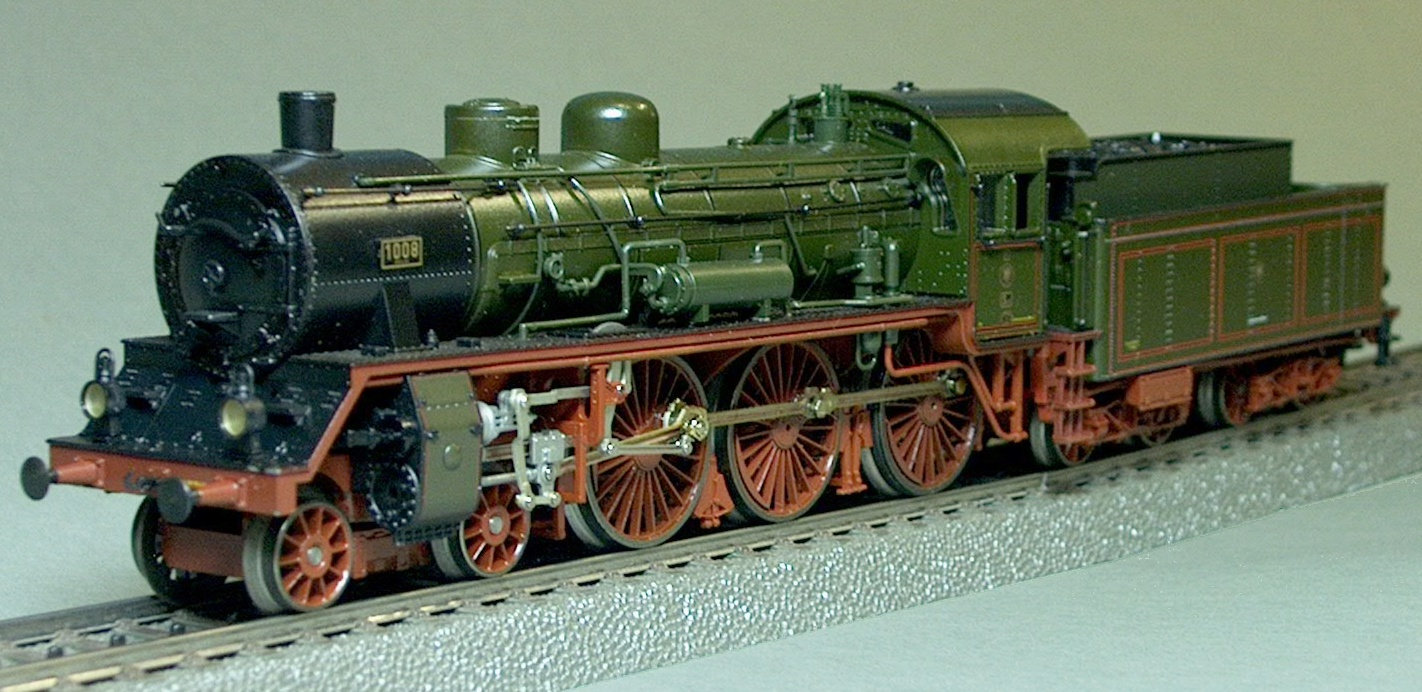
Märklin model 33190.10, from set 2881; model of KPEV S10 nr. 1008, later DB 17 008; Schwartzkopf factory number 4760

Over the years, the Märklin marque became valuable to model train collectors, some of the very early models fetching large prices at auction.

The Märklin toy company systematically included a print run number on almost all printed material, including the boxes in which their products shipped. These print run numbers indicate the printer and also the month and year of printing. This is useful for dating an item that is known to be associated with some printed material. The second group of digits indicates the catalogue number. The last set of numeric digits in the print run number indicates the month and year that the item was printed. The last group of letters identifies the printer.

Koll's Preiskatalog issued by Joachim Koll in German lists all 00/H0 models and provides price estimates. Märklin's products are mainly German (DB) model trains. However, Märklin also produces Swiss (SBB), Dutch (NS), American (various independent railways from the Golden Age of American trains), and various other model trains from around the world.

In January 2005, the Märklin museum in Göppingen, Germany, was burgled and more than 100 pieces, with an estimated value of more than 1 million Euros, were stolen. The items, which included one-of-a-kind prototypes along with pieces that dated back to 1891, were recovered in March 2005.

The third game in the Ticket to Ride board game series, released in 2006, was named Märklin in their honour.

In 2010 Märklin announced the release of its sixth model of the Russian Railways, the Russian Velaro SAPSAN high speed train. The model is based upon the DB ICE 3MF model which began to be sold in 2008. The first SŽD railways Russian H0 models was a Transsiberian 100 ЛеТ Транссибирской (100 Let Transsibirskoy) tanker wagon, a rare limited edition from 1991, two locomotives, steam locomotive Series TЭ-5293 (Märklin ref. 34159), a second version of the same Cold War military reserve steam locomotive TЭ-3915 (Märklin ref. 37159) and two SŽD car goods wagon sets (Märklin ref. 47897 and ref. 47899).

=== Nominal size H0 ===
The largest segment of product range and sales is nominal size H0, with a scale of 1:87 and an H0 track. Märklin introduced it in 1935, about half a year later than Trix, and today it is the most common size worldwide. The company is market leader in H0 in German-speaking countries (Germany, Austria and Switzerland), having a market-share of approximately 50 per cent. So, in the area of H0 tracks, there are two categories of similar size - the track system with two conductors, produced by multiple companies on the one side, the middle-conductor track system dominated by Märklin on the other. Also, in this area Märklin is the only company to offer a complete assortment of goods - the range in this track size consists of a huge variety of rolling stock, tracks, analog as well as digital control systems, trolley systems and other accessory parts.

== Gallery ==
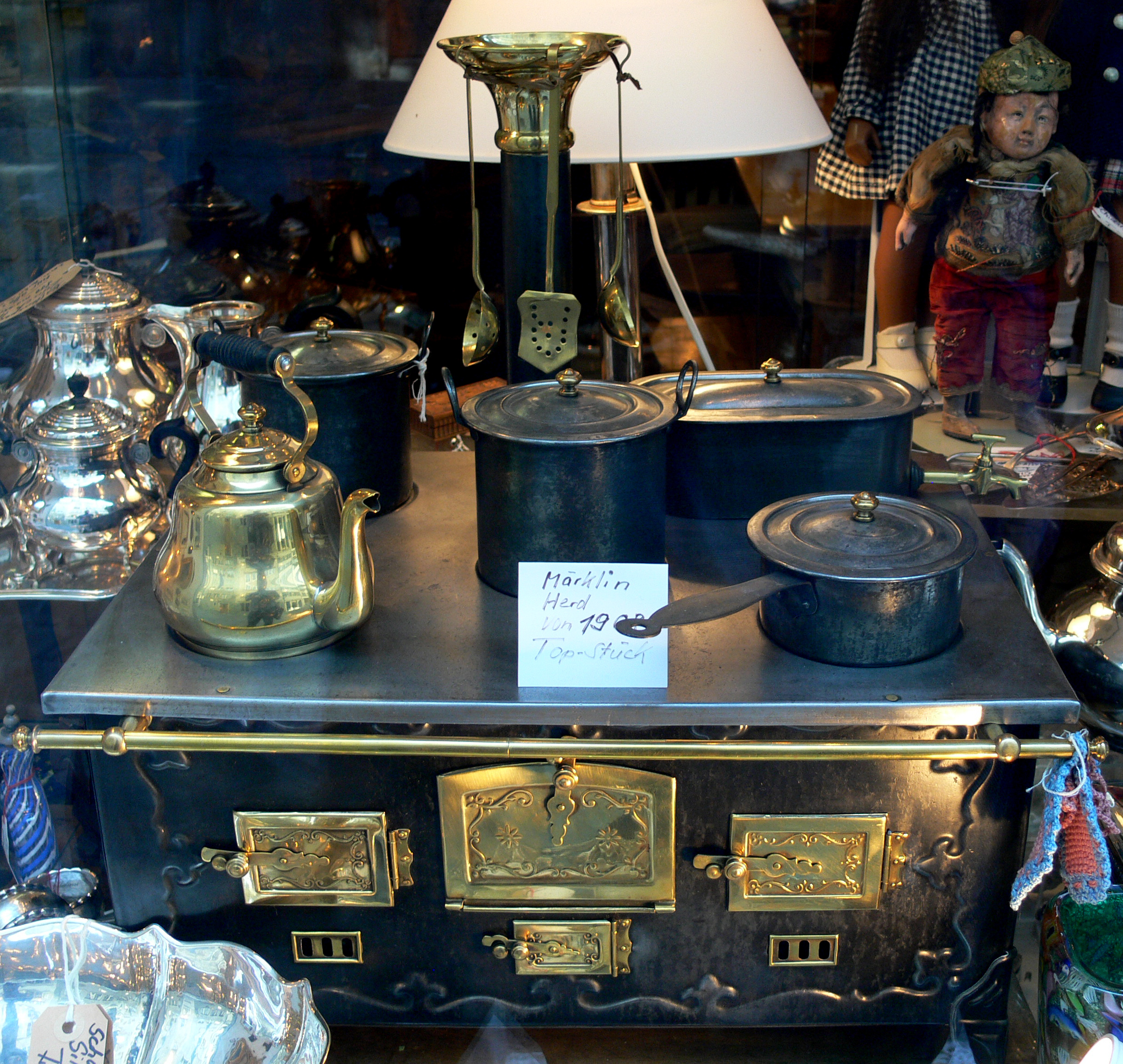
Doll stove, around 1900

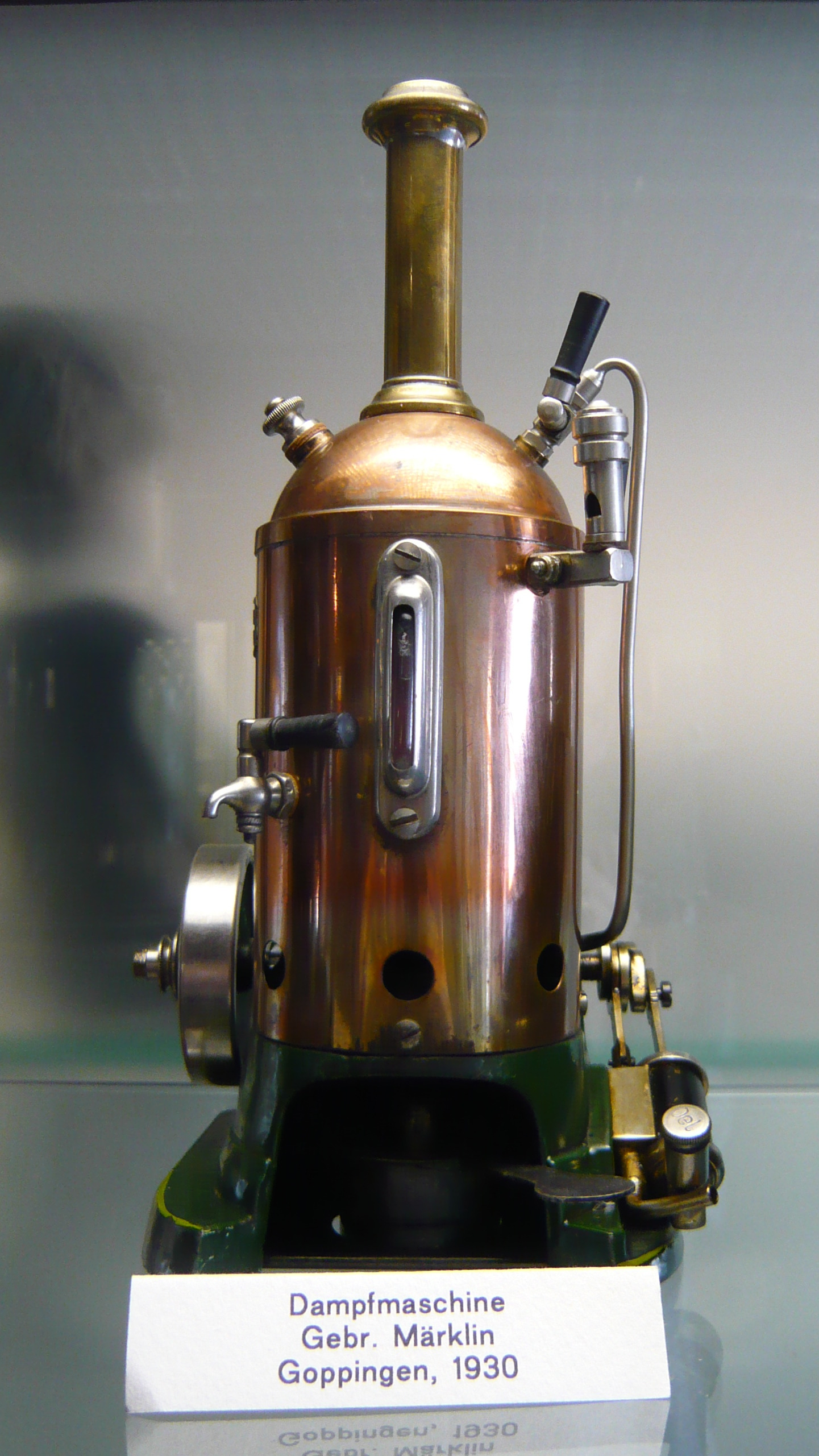
Stationary steam engine, 1930

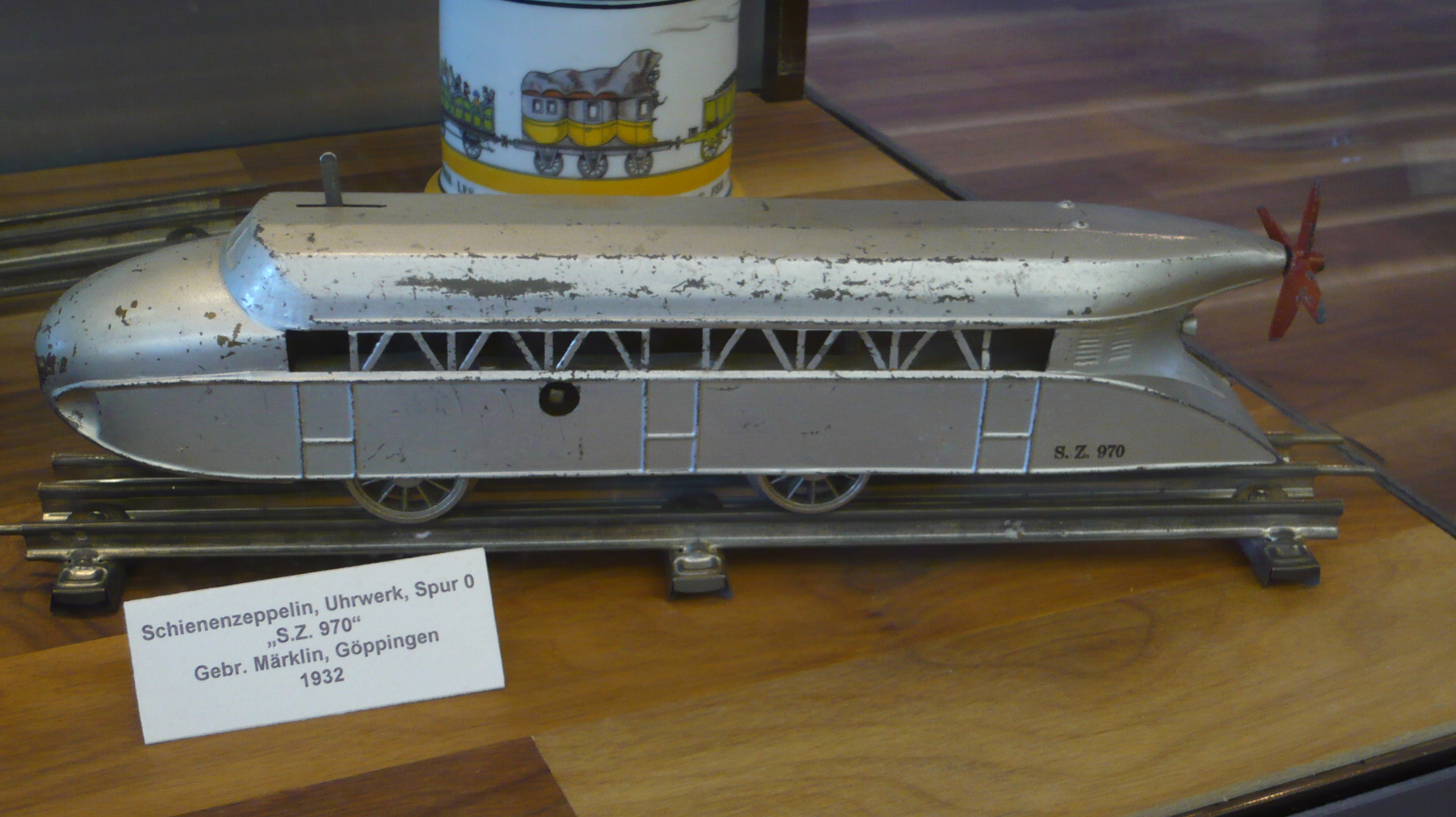
1932 O-gauge model of the Schienenzeppelin

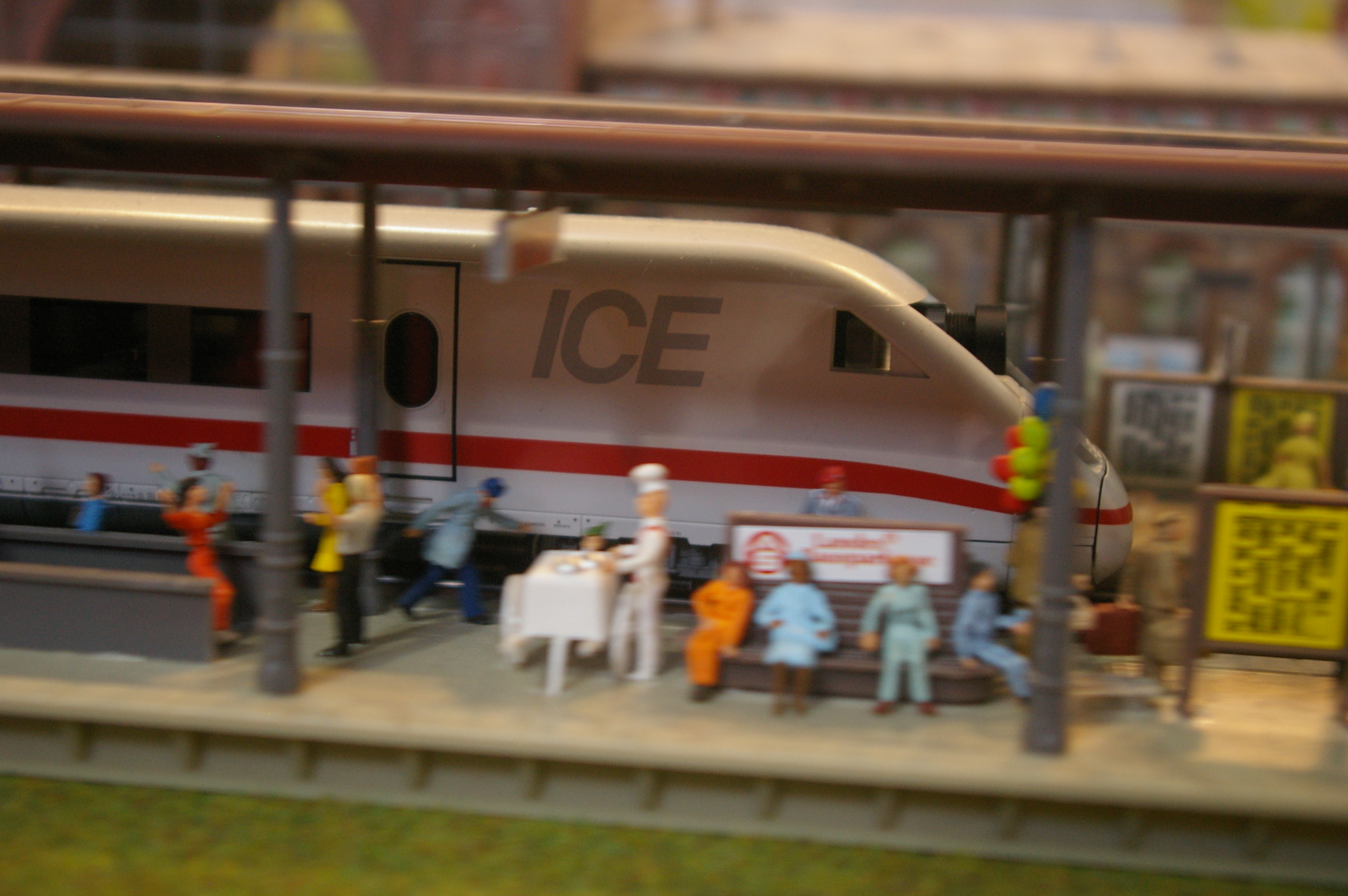
Märklin Mobile Vision (digital camera mounted on a locomotive)

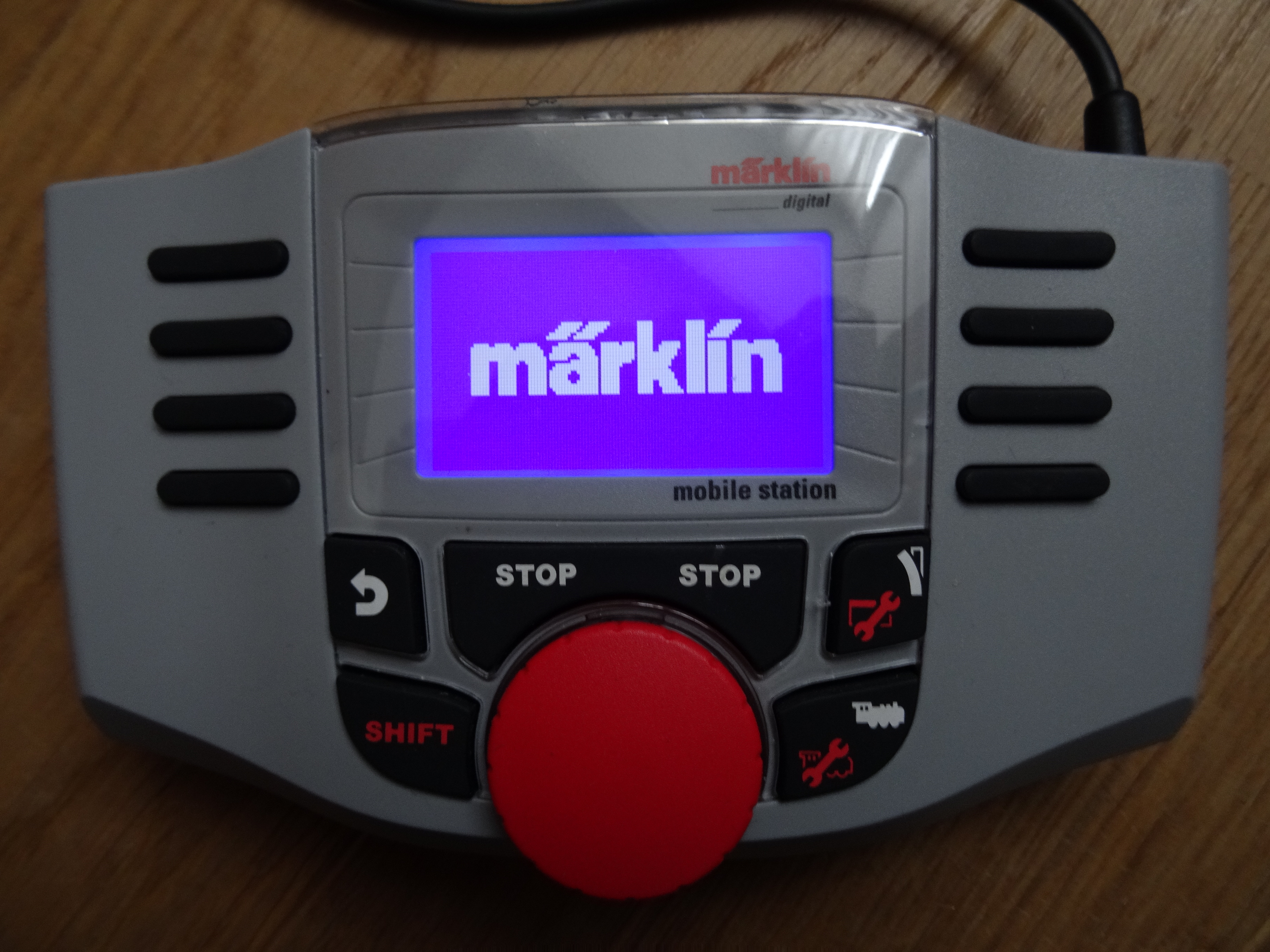
Märklin 60657 Mobile Stations. Digital handheld controller.
