= Hattons Model Railways =

Hattons Model Railways Ltd
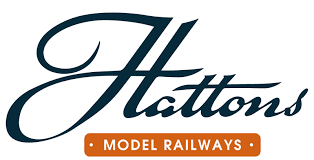
- Type: Private Limited Company
- Industry: Retail
- Founded: 1946; 80 years ago in Liverpool, England
- Founder: Norman Hatton
- Defunct: February 4, 2024
- Headquarters: Widnes, England
- Key people: Richard Davies (Managing Director); Christine Hatton (Chair)
- Products: Model Railways & Diecast Collectables
- Brands: Hattons Originals, Hattons Essentials, Hattons Constructor, Hattons Model Money
- Revenue: £11 million (2022)
- Number of employees: 62 (2021)
- Website: hattons.co.uk

Hattons Model Railways was a British retailer and manufacturer of model railway paraphernalia founded in Liverpool, England, in 1946 by Norman Hatton (1918–2005). After significant growth due to a move into online mail order, the company relocated to Widnes, Cheshire, in January 2016 and Hattons would later close down on 4 February 2024.

== Early years ==
After leaving the army in 1946, Norman Hatton opened a shop at 142 Smithdown Road in Liverpool. His idea was to sell things that people found hard to get after the war. He sold bric-à-brac, fireworks, household items such as firewood and almost anything he could find, including gas masks. He discovered that model locomotives and toys were his best-selling items and he began to focus his attention on purchasing as much of this kind of stock as he could, mainly driving around Liverpool looking for second-hand stock to sell on; by the 1950s Hattons was on its way to becoming a fully-fledged model shop.

== 1950s – 1990s ==
By 1958 Norman realised that he needed bigger premises. He remained on Smithdown Road and moved into number 180 that year. It was around this time that Meccano wanted to offload a large quantity of stock, and they sold the lot to Hattons for a fraction of what they were worth. Norman was quoted in a 2001 interview as saying some items took 20 years to sell out, due to the amount he had purchased.

Norman placed extensive adverts in the model railway press, and the company grew throughout the 1960s, 1970s and 1980s with the help of mail order customers from all over the world sending Norman regular business.

In 1999 Hattons launched their first website, a directory of the items that they had for sale, to make it easier for people wanting to place orders by post or over the telephone to view the entire stock in one place. The same year number 182 Smithdown Road was purchased and the store expanded into both buildings.

Norman semi-retired in 1998, leaving the running of the business to his two children Keith (1959–2008) and Christine Hatton.

== 2000s – 2024 ==
Despite only having expanded the building in 1999, by 2001 the business was relocated further along Smithdown Road to numbers 364–368, which better suited the ever-expanding stock levels.

2002 saw the launch of the eHattons website, which allowed customers to order directly online for the first time.

Norman Hatton died in 2005 aged 87. By then, Hattons was turning over £1 million per year. His son Keith also died during a holiday in Ibiza in 2008. He was just 49. Following the deaths of her father and brother, Christine Hatton took over the running of the company along with present managing director Richard Davies.

The early 2010s saw Hattons move the majority of their stock to a warehouse in Widnes, Cheshire, known as the Hattons Hub; and in January 2016, after 70 years, the store on Smithdown Road was closed for the final time, with all operations moving to the Widnes site on Montague Road. The expansion of the company's online business meant that having stock split over two sites was no longer viable. Further, the Smithdown Road building needed to be brought up to modern standards and the lack of parking outside the store was inconvenient for customers.

The building on Smithdown Road was turned into a Leaf tearoom in September 2019. One of their tables is made from the Hattons signage.

As of 2022, the company turned over £11 millions, down from £17 millions in 2018.

On 8 January 2024, Hatton's Model Railways announced on their social media platforms that they would be closing down. The company cited "changing market conditions" as the reason for their decision, including "dramatically" increased costs for compliance, changes in the number and demographics of their customer base, as well as supply chain disruptions. Hattons permanently closed their shop on Sunday 4 February 2024.

In April 2024 it was announced that the Hattons Brand had been bought by Rails of Sheffield, and that the Hattons brand is planned to re-launch online in the future.

== Manufacturing ==
Hattons started to push manufacturing their own products exclusively in 2018, under their Hattons Originals sub-brand. Before this, they had mainly designed products and then relied on third-party manufacturers such as Heljan and Dapol to produce them. Some Heljan products included the Beyer Garratt and BR Class 14 locomotives.

2018 saw the release of the first Hattons self-produced products, their P Class and Andrew Barclay Sons & Co. range of locomotives, quickly followed by other self-produced models such as a range of 50t Warwell wagons, FEA Intermodal wagons and Rail Head Treatment Trains. In 2019, Hattons released an extensive range of Class 66 locomotives.

In 2021, Hattons were set to release a range of 4- and 6- wheel coaches in OO gauge, representing the trains that would have been commonplace in the late 19th and early 20th centuries.

In 2024, after Hattons' closure, their model railway toolings were sold to Rails of Sheffield and Accurascale.

== Pre-owned model railways ==
Hattons began to buy and sell secondhand model railway items, diecast vehicles and plastic kits in 2013. This became a popular area of the Hattons website and proved to be a successful venture for the business. So much so, that they expanded their operation to include a new sub-brand called Hattons Model Money, which took the form of a new website where customers could list their items online and receive a free valuation.

== Brands and product types ==
Before closure, Hattons stocked a vast number of items, and boasted on their website that they usually had over 18,000 items available for sale. Products sold included locomotives, model vehicles and aircraft, scenery, track, tools and paints. Some of the well known brands sold by Hattons included:

- Hornby (Including Airfix, Corgi Toys, Rivarossi)
- Heljan A/S
- Dapol
- Peco
- Oxford Diecast/Rail
- Gaugemaster (including Kato)
- DCC Concepts
