= Lima (models) =

Italian brand of model railways, 1946–2004

Lima S.p.A.
- Industry: Hobbies
- Founded: 1946; 80 years ago
- Defunct: 2004
- Fate: Brand acquired by Hornby
- Headquarters: Vicenza, Italy
- Products: Model railways
- Website: limamodel.it

Lima S.p.A. (Lima Models) is an Italian brand and former manufacturing company of model railways. The company was headquartered in Vicenza for almost 50 years, from the early 1950s until the company ceased trading in 2004. Lima was a popular, affordable brand of 00 gauge and N gauge model railway material in the UK, more detailed H0 and N gauge models in France, Germany, Italy, Switzerland, and the United States as well as South Africa, Scandinavia and Australia. Lima also produced a small range of 0 gauge models. Lima partnered with various distributors and manufacturers, selling under brands such as A.H.M., Model Power, and Minitrain. Market pressures from superior Far Eastern products in the mid-1990s led to Lima merging with Rivarossi, Arnold, and Jouef. Ultimately, these consolidations failed and operations ceased in 2004.

Hornby Railways offered €8 million to acquire Lima's assets (including tooling, inventory, and the various brand names) in March of the same year, the Italian bankruptcy court of Brescia, last headquarters of Lima, approving the offer later that year. In December 2004, Hornby Railways formally announced the acquisition along with the Rivarossi (H0 North American and Italian prototypes), Arnold (N scale European prototypes), Jouef (H0 scale French prototypes), and Pocher (die-cast metal automobile kits) ranges. As of mid-2006, a range of these products has been made available under the Hornby International brand, refitted with NEM couplings and sprung buffers and sockets for Digital Command Control (DCC) decoders.

== Formation ==
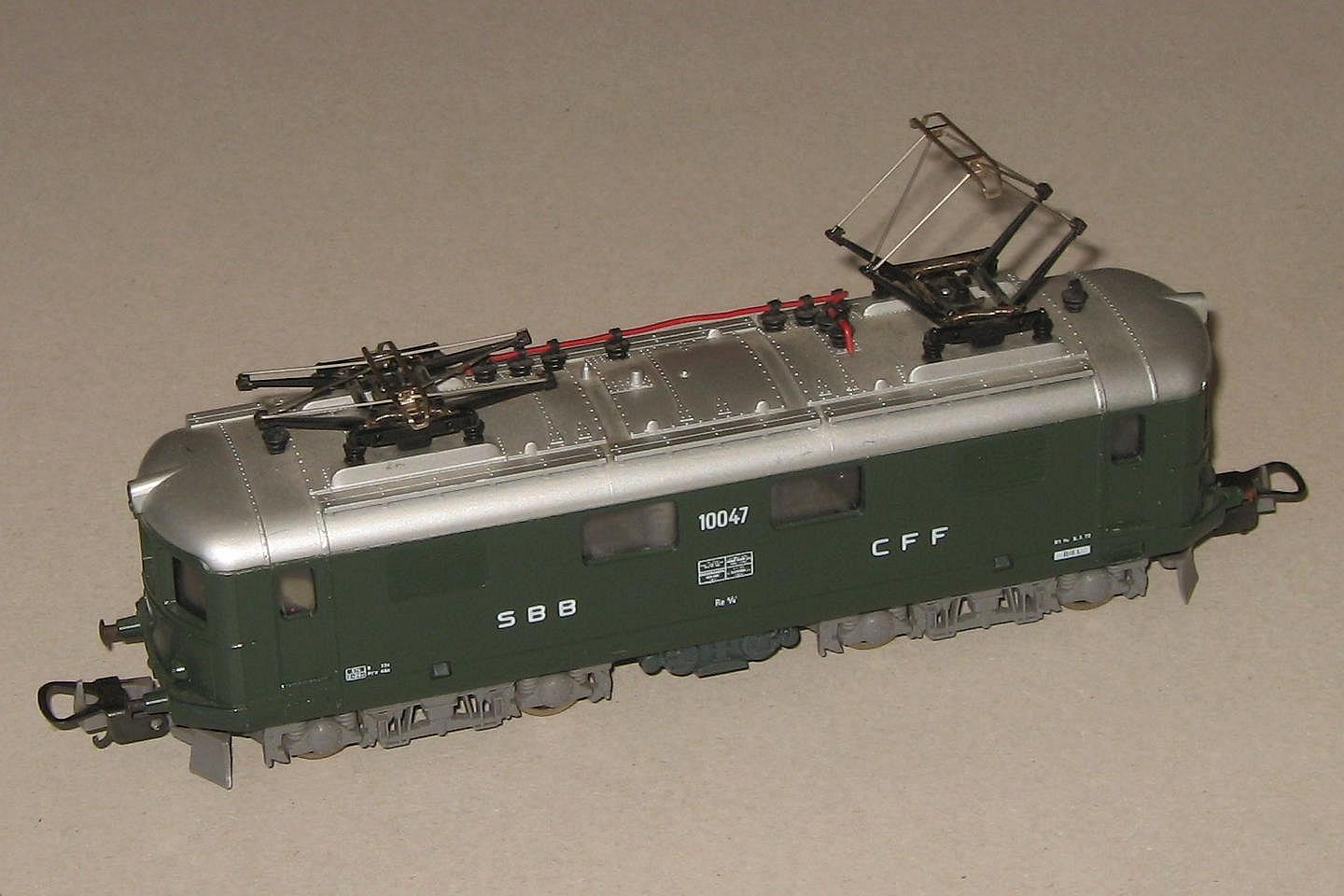
A HO scale model of SBB CFF FFS electric locomotive made for the European markets.

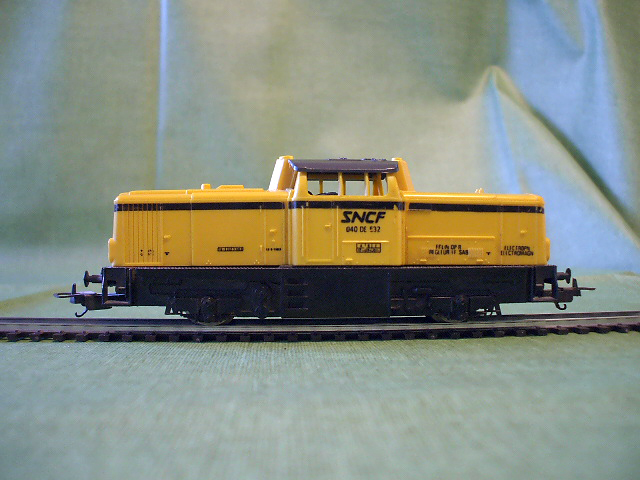
A simplified HO scale model of SNCF diesel locomotive made for the European markets

Lima (Lavorazione Italiana Metalli e Affini) was founded in 1946 as a parts supplier for the Italian state railway. In 1948, Lima switched its aluminium casting capability to producing toy boats, trains and cars.

In 1953 it started manufacturing a low budget model range. The models were gradually improved and by 1962 Lima was producing French, Belgian, Dutch and German models. Less than 10 years later, Lima was one of the largest model manufacturers in the world serving the modeling markets of the United States, Australia, Britain and South Africa. In 1977 the British model range switched from HO to 00 gauge.

Starting in 1982, Lima gradually moved into the higher quality market in mainland Europe with the introduction of better mechanisms such as Central Can Motors, flywheels and all bogie power as well as catering for niche markets.

== United Kingdom ==
Lima focused heavily on the British range in the late 1980s which had expanded hugely due to the Sectorisation strategy of the then state operator British Rail. This was possible because of their capability to do small production runs (c.500), in contrast to its main UK rival, Hornby Railways, who required a minimum run of 4,000. Consequently, Riko International, Lima's UK distributor, were able to provide models within weeks of rollout of the actual prototype.

By the mid-1990s, Lima had a swollen UK product range of over 300 models, some of questionable quality, while still producing new variations at a rate of five or more new schemes a month. A clearance campaign ran in 1993 with a mass sale of the entire range of existing stock. While this stimulated sales, demand subsequently shifted to the now considerable second-hand market. There was also an attempt to compete with Hornby and Bachmann by introducing new paint schemes on existing 1980s steam models. The distributor, Riko International went into receivership in 1999 and their replacement, The Hobby Company, commenced by commissioning further repaints and a new model, the Class 66. In early 2000, Lima finally delivered an updated Class 67 to match the improved standards in the market. However, the much-improved motor did not compensate the many other faults and failed to make an impact. This turned out to be the last completely new model from Lima and the company subsequently folded, being bought out by Hornby.

The demise of Lima in 2004 left a significant supply gap for some of the key classes of the British diesel and electric locomotives range. However, since acquiring Lima, Hornby have re-released many of these models under their own brand name. Hornby now provide updated models of the Class 08, 31, 50, 60, Class 67 and Class 92 also, re-releasing many of the much sought after Lima originals such as the Class 73 and 156.

== North America ==
Lima produced a variety of H0 models for the North American market. Initially, the quality was on par with other brands of the era, but competitors' improvements in detail and running characteristics soon relegated much of Lima's product to near toy status. At least one round of improvements was made, but Lima never quite caught up with its competition.

The company also entered N scale fairly early in the game, producing at first Continental and British outline stock, some of which was fancifully decorated for North American railroads and sold in the States under the A.H.M. brand. Eventually, Lima developed a small assortment of distinctive American equipment, including four diesel locomotives, heavyweight passenger cars, several freight cars, and a caboose. Generally, the N scale line suffered from the same lack of improvements that plagued the North American H0 offerings. HO scale is 1:87.

== Europe ==
Lima's continental outline catalogue concentrated first on French and German and then Italian and Swiss equipment. Their relatively inexpensive offerings doubtless brought many people into the hobby. A modest assortment of accessories, including operable pieces like level crossings and an intermodal terminal, as well as static structures and lineside details, enhanced the 'playtime' pleasure of building and operating a Lima-based train layout.

Lima also was one of the first to make scale models from the Scandinavian countries. Examples covered the DSB class MZ diesel locomotive with the matching coaches in a smart red livery. They made the Swedish SJ Rc locomotive with a wide range of coaches, including the rare dining and sleeping car. Also Norwegian locomotives and coaches were made. Several goods cars, for example "Tuborg" and "Carlsberg" beer cars, were made - some of these to be repeated in "0" scale. Most were simple but robust. Only the engines suffered from lack of traction and too high speed, a problem first solved much later when Roco started to set pace in the Model railway world in the 1980s.

In the 1990s, many products could compete with other significant brands and catalogues covered almost any European country both in DC/AC. However a price had to be paid for running a 300-page catalogue at the same time as demand was generally dropping overall, and Lima went bankrupt.

== Australia ==
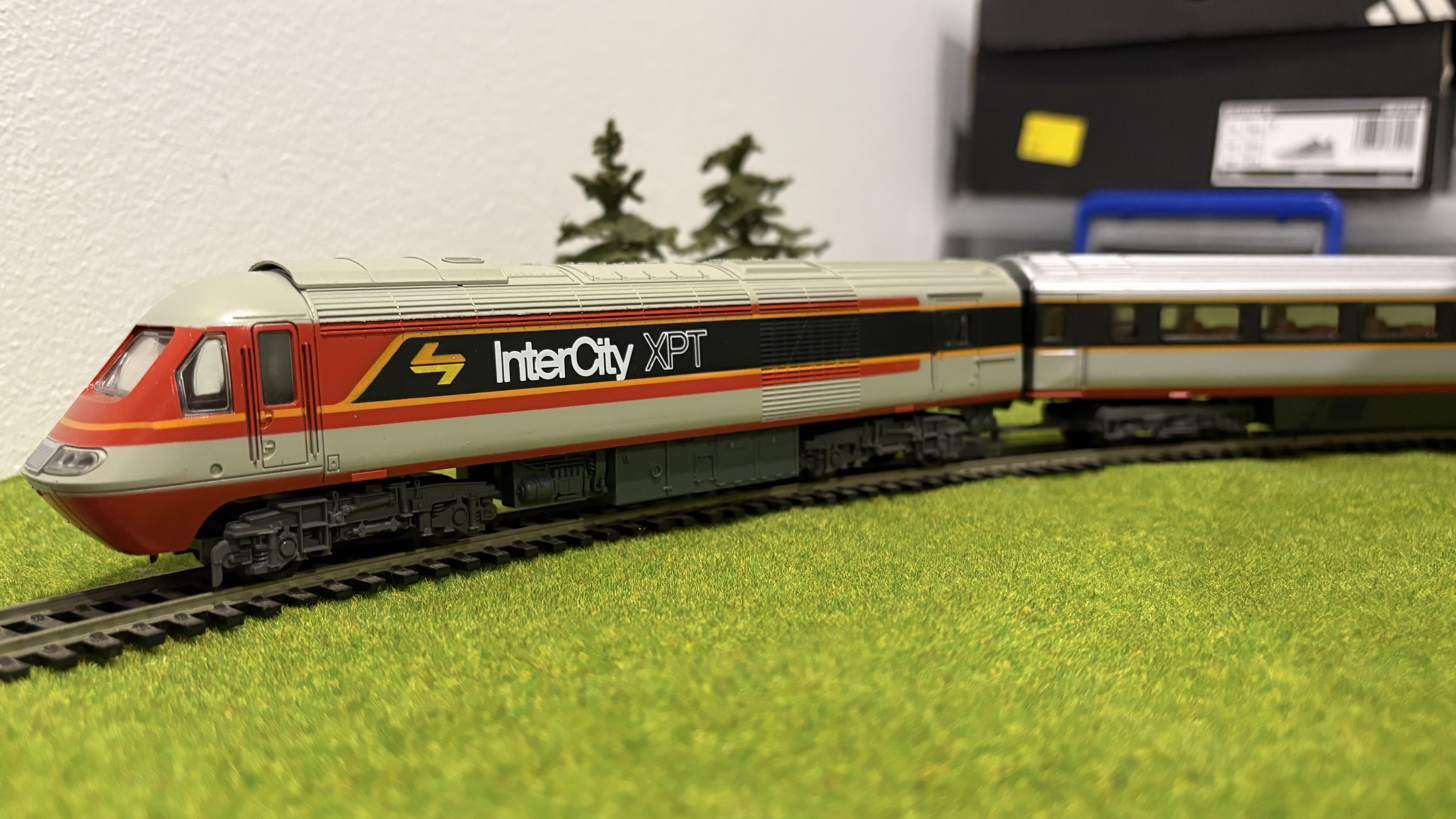
A Lima XPT

Lima entered the Australian market in 1970 with models that matched the railways of New South Wales and Victoria reasonably well. Some models were not true representations of the prototype — the Lima Express Passenger Train (XPT) was just a repaint of the British High Speed Train (HST) — and all had NEM wheels and couplers. However the cheapness of Lima models made them popular with beginners and many models were super detailed by experienced modellers. The Australian Model Railway Magazine (AMRM), Issue 200, October 1996, carries a 14-page article on super-detailing the Lima New South Wales State Rail Authority 422.

For NSW, Lima produced the steam 38, and diesel-electric 42, 44 and 422 class locos. For Victoria, they produced the diesel-electric S and B class. For South Australia, they produced the diesel-electric 930 class. In the early 1980s, Lima also renumbered their HO British 4F steamer as a NSW 19 class in black. The Commonwealth Railways stainless steel carriage stock was also produced by Lima.

In 2006, Hornby Railways announced that some of the Lima Australian range would be re-released under the Hornby International brand from late 2007.

== Limited Editions ==
A unique feature of Lima was its capability to do production runs of less than 1,000 units versus the norm of 4,000 to 5,000. This was because the importer only ordered a volume that matched the orders received in advance by its retailers. In the mid-1990s, Lima used this flexibility to introduce a range of "limited edition" models in small quantities (550 to 850), so as to maintain sales. This commenced with a model of the Class 50, "Thunderer" issued at £33, which proved very successful, commanding over £100 within a few weeks.

Lima also took on commissions from shops that purchased the entire limited production run, these being retailed directly through their stores. This began with Cheltenham Model Centre's D1015 Western Champion. Over 100 different models were produced this way. This commercial practice provided Irish modellers, via Murphy Models of Dublin, with the first ever specific Irish scene RTR diesel locomotive, the General Motors 201 Class. Fewer than 3,000 were produced (in nine variants) and as of 2009 can still fetch over £300 at on-line auctions. In 2008, Murphy Models brought out the second specific RTR Irish Diesel Locomotive, a highly detailed Bachmann version of the CIE 141 Class.
