= Rails of Sheffield =

British model railway retailer

- Company type: Private Limited Company
- Industry: Retail
- Founded: 1970; 56 years ago in Sheffield, England
- Founder: Hedley Barber
- Headquarters: Sheffield, England
- Key people: John Hedley Barber (Managing Director)
- Website: railsofsheffield.com

Rails of Sheffield is a British retailer and manufacturer of model railway paraphernalia founded in Sheffield, England, in 1970 by Hedley Francis Barber (1929–2015).

The shop, which is located on Chesterfield Road, which has seen numerous expansions over the decades, has become the largest stockist of model railway products in the United Kingdom. A number of notable customers have visited the store whilst visiting the city including Jools Holland and Rod Stewart.

The shop carries various brands including Hornby, Corgi, Airfix amongst others.

On 4 February 2024 Hattons Model Railways ceased operations and many of its toolings were sold to Rails of Sheffield.

On 29 November 2025, a second retail location was opened at the Sheffield station.
