= Pocher =

Italian toy car brand, 1966 to 2000

- Founded: 1966
- Founder: Arnaldo Pocher
- Defunct: 2000; 26 years ago
- Fate: Company defunct, brand name acquired and owned by Hornby
- Headquarters: Italy
- Products: Scale model cars
- Owner: Hornby (2013–present)
- Website: pocher.com

Pocher is an Italian toy car brand and former manufacturing company of scale model cars. The company, established by Arnaldo Pocher, was active from 1966 to 2000, and since 2013 the brand name "Pocher" has been owned and operated by Hornby Railways.

== History ==
=== The early years ===
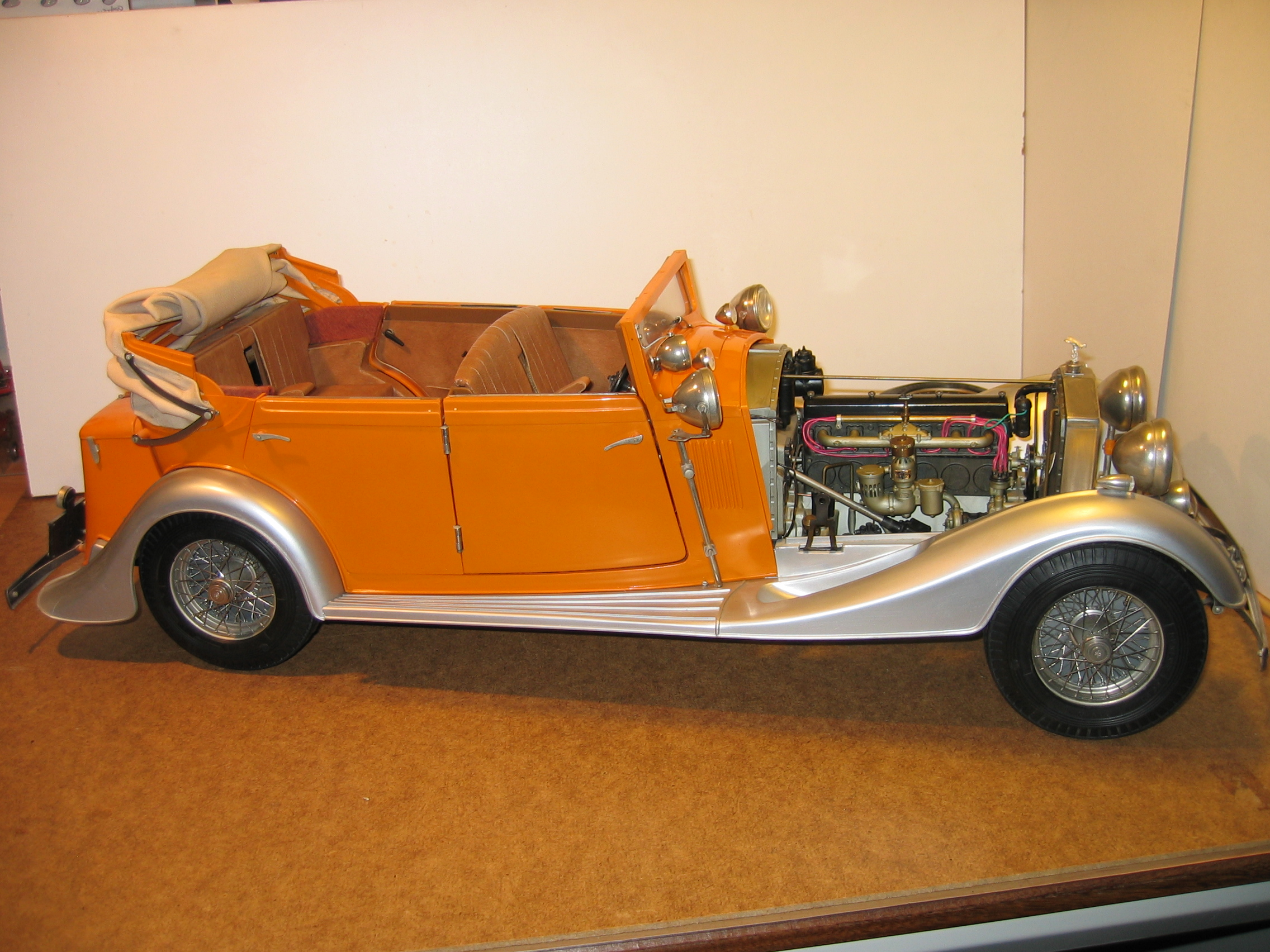
Rolls-Royce Phantom II Torpedo Convertible (K75)

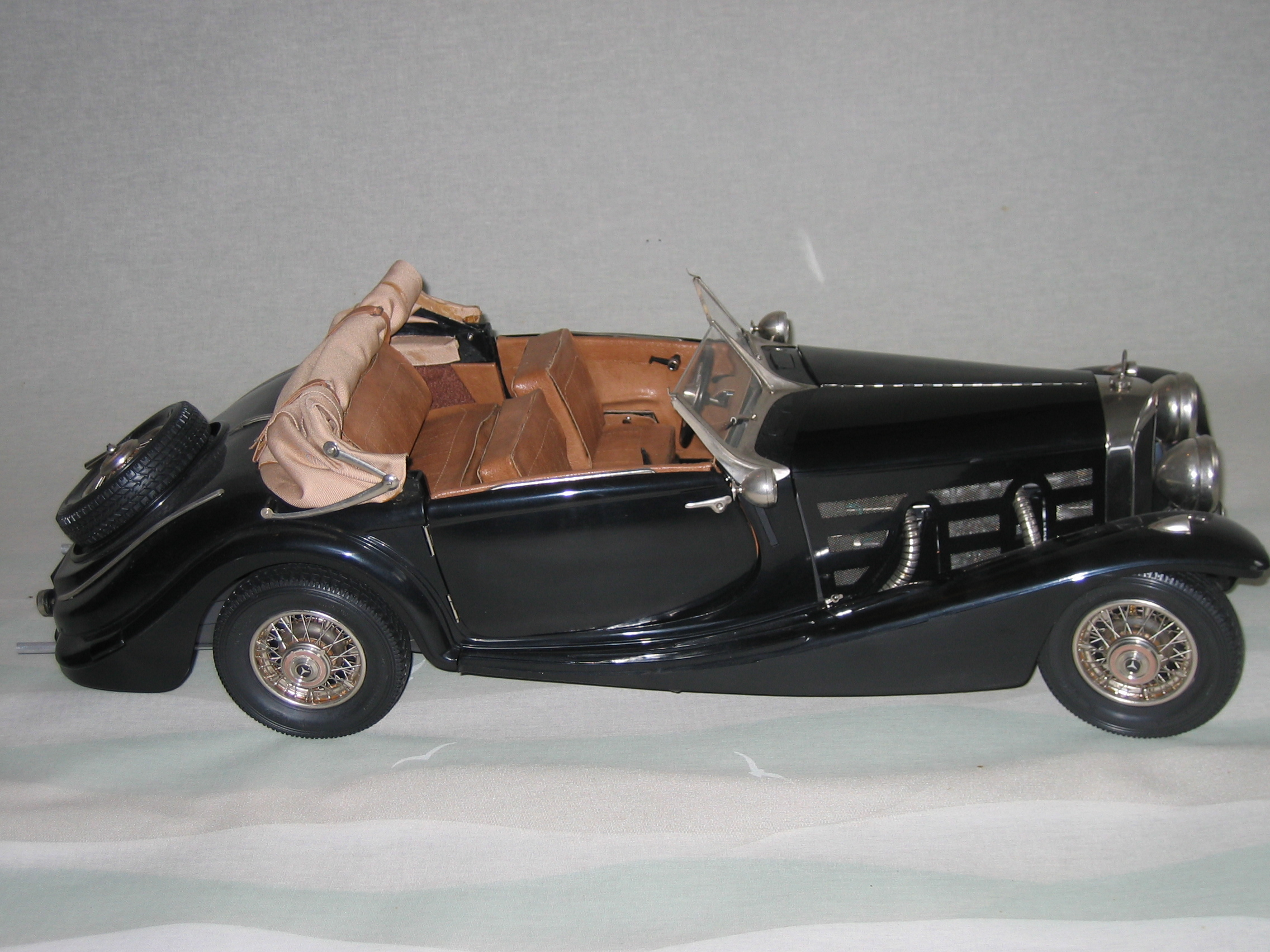
Mercedes-Benz 500K/AK Cabriolet (K74)

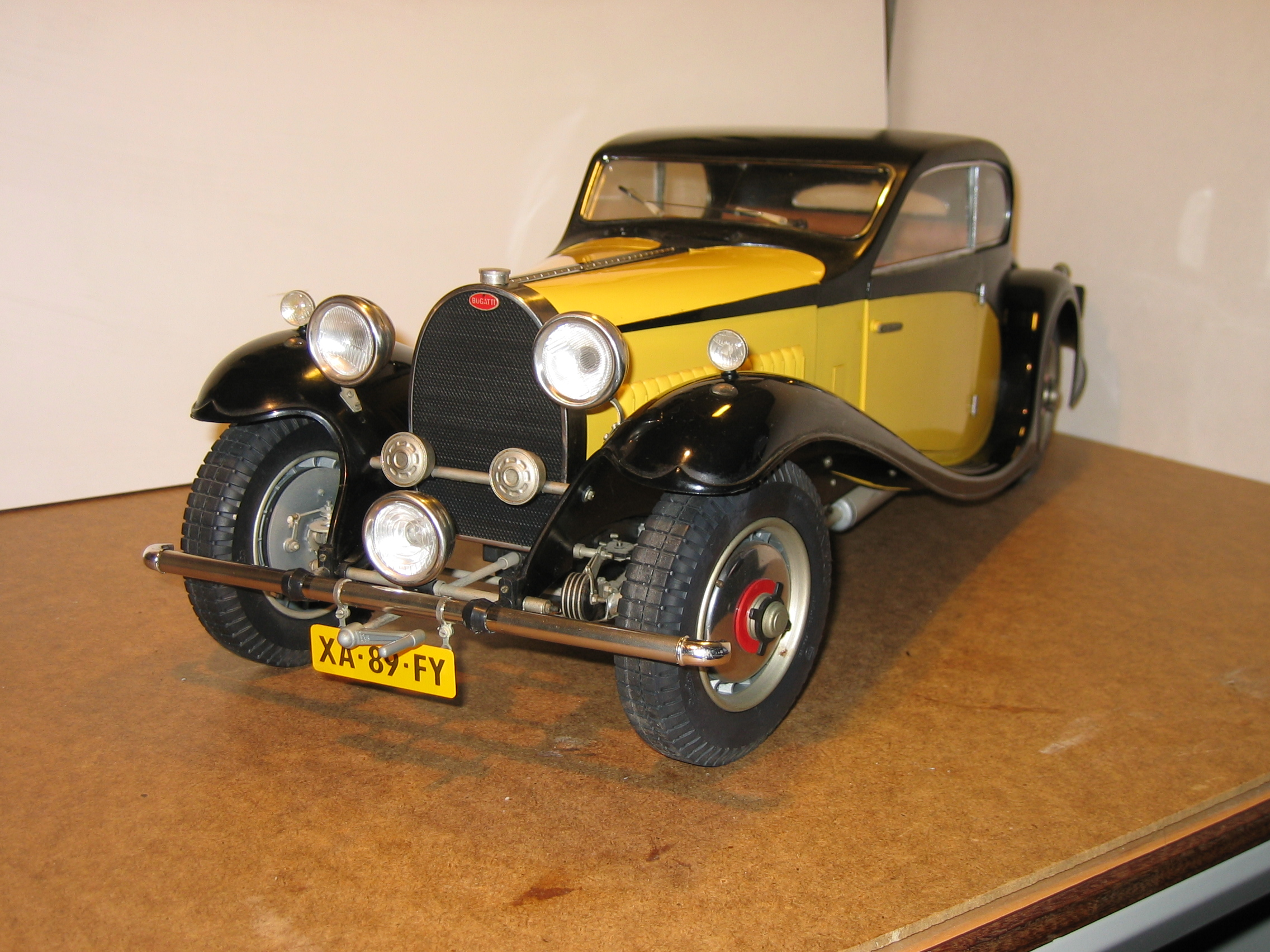
Bugatti Type 50 (K76)

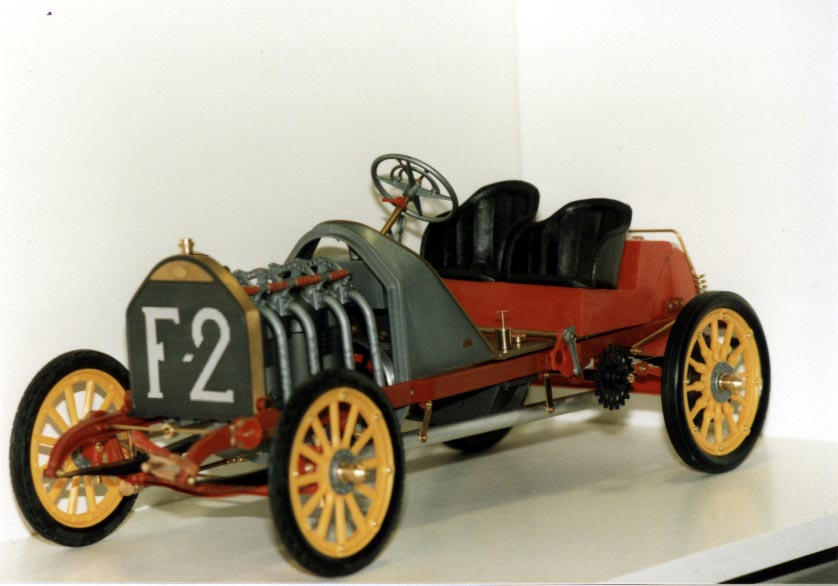
Fiat 130hp

Arnaldo Pocher was born in 1911 in Trento, Italy. He trained as a goldsmith engraver and went to work in Turin. In the years following the Second World War he became interested in railway modelling and in 1951 he formed Pocher Micromeccanica S.n.c. alongside Corrado Muratore producing train signals, platforms and points using innovative production techniques. Under a change of name, The Corrado Muratore and Arnaldo Pocher Company, they produced finely detailed freight and passenger carriages in white metal and later locomotives and power cars.

=== Pocher 1:8 model kits ===
At the International Toy Fair of Milan in 1966, the Pocher stand astonished the world with its detailed 1:8 scale model of the Fiat F2 130HP, the car which won the 1907 French Grand Prix driven by Felice Nazzaro. The model contained 144 high-resistance plastic parts, 173 in brass and 506 in steel, copper, leather, rubber and aluminium. The Company went on to produce ever more detailed models of motoring classics including the 1931–34 Alfa Romeo 2300 Ac Monza, the 1932 Rolls-Royce Phantom II Drophead Sedanca Coupe, the 1932 Alfa Romeo Touring, the Mercedes-Benz 500K/AK containing 2,378 part and then the Rolls-Royce Torpedo Phantom II Convertible with 2,905 parts.

These kits were based on original plans from the manufacturer. Two features present on some models were spoked wire wheels that were assembled spoke by spoke, and engines with working crankshaft and piston assemblies. Assembly was mostly accomplished with threaded fasteners (screws, bolts, nuts) and very little glue. This created finished products that could theoretically be disassembled and repaired or modified. Kits came molded in color and ready painted. Finished preassembled versions were also sold.

In the 1970s Corrado Muratore sold his part of the company to Rivarossi, a bit later Arnaldo Pocher sold his part, too. While Corrado Muratore continued as general manager of Pocher and national sales manager, Arnaldo Pocher left the company.

=== The product ranges ===
The earlier high piece and high detail kits were referred to as the Classic line. Later a less assembly intensive line appeared which was called the Prestige line of cars. Classic kits were known for their high piece count and incredible detail such as working brake systems, engines with rotating crankshafts and moving pistons, windows that moved up and down, steering that operated, and when a tiny key was inserted into the dashboard the headlights lit up. Classic kits faithfully represented mostly 1930s cars from Fiat, Alfa Romeo, Bugatti, Mercedes-Benz, and Rolls-Royce. Prestige kits were most often die cast metal bodies and contained about 500 parts. They featured working suspension and opening doors and detailed engines. These kits were designed to provide attractive models that could be built with little difficulty. These were mostly of Ferraris such as the Testarossa and F40, along with a few Porsches. A third line existed which was called Pocher Truck. This consisted of two Volvo trucks using the same assembly method as Prestige - mainly press fit parts with superb detailing. Four separate engine kits were produced that featured the engines from Ferrari Testarossa, Ferrari F40, Volvo, and Bugatti. Of these four kits the Bugatti was the most complex as it had a moving crankshaft and pistons.

All model kits in the automobile line were produced in one eighth scale. These cars could be up to 22 inches (560 mm) long and weigh up to 16 pounds (7.3 kg). The aftermarket products produced to support these kits is a small scale industry and the remaining unassembled kits are rare items.Today, they are available through collector channels.

=== Hornby and Pocher ===
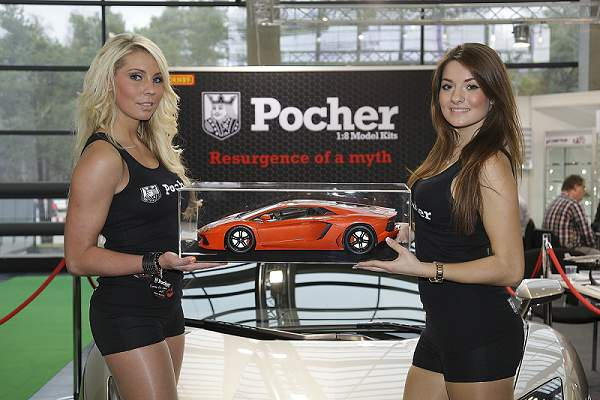
Official presentation of the new Pocher 1:8 model kit on the Nueremberg International Toy Fair 2013

After the Lima group went into bankruptcy the Pocher brand was bought by Hornby in 2004. In December 2012 Hornby announced the "resurgence of a myth" on the official website of Pocher. An official presentation was held on the Nuremberg International Toy Fair on 30 January 2013. Pocher presented the new 1:8 model kit of the Lamborghini Aventador .

At Nuremberg 2014 two new models were announced: HK105/6 Lamborghini Huracan and HK107 Ducati Panigale Superbike.

=== Vestergaard and Pocher ===
In February 2017, while Hornby was in financial crisis and in need of cash, the Danish importer Vestergaard acquired Pocher and its surplus inventory which included about 1600 Ducati kits. A green version of the Pocher Lamborghini Huracan, kit# HK109, was produced and released under Vestergaard ownership of the brand.

Hornby has recently repurchased ownership of the brand. In October 2020, Hornby's interim results stated "With distribution in 27 countries and with plans to launch more new and varied models in the not too distant future, the Pocher legacy of high-quality large-scale model kits will continue." Furthermore, the website and trade mark continue to be registered to Hornby.

== Pocher prestige model list ==
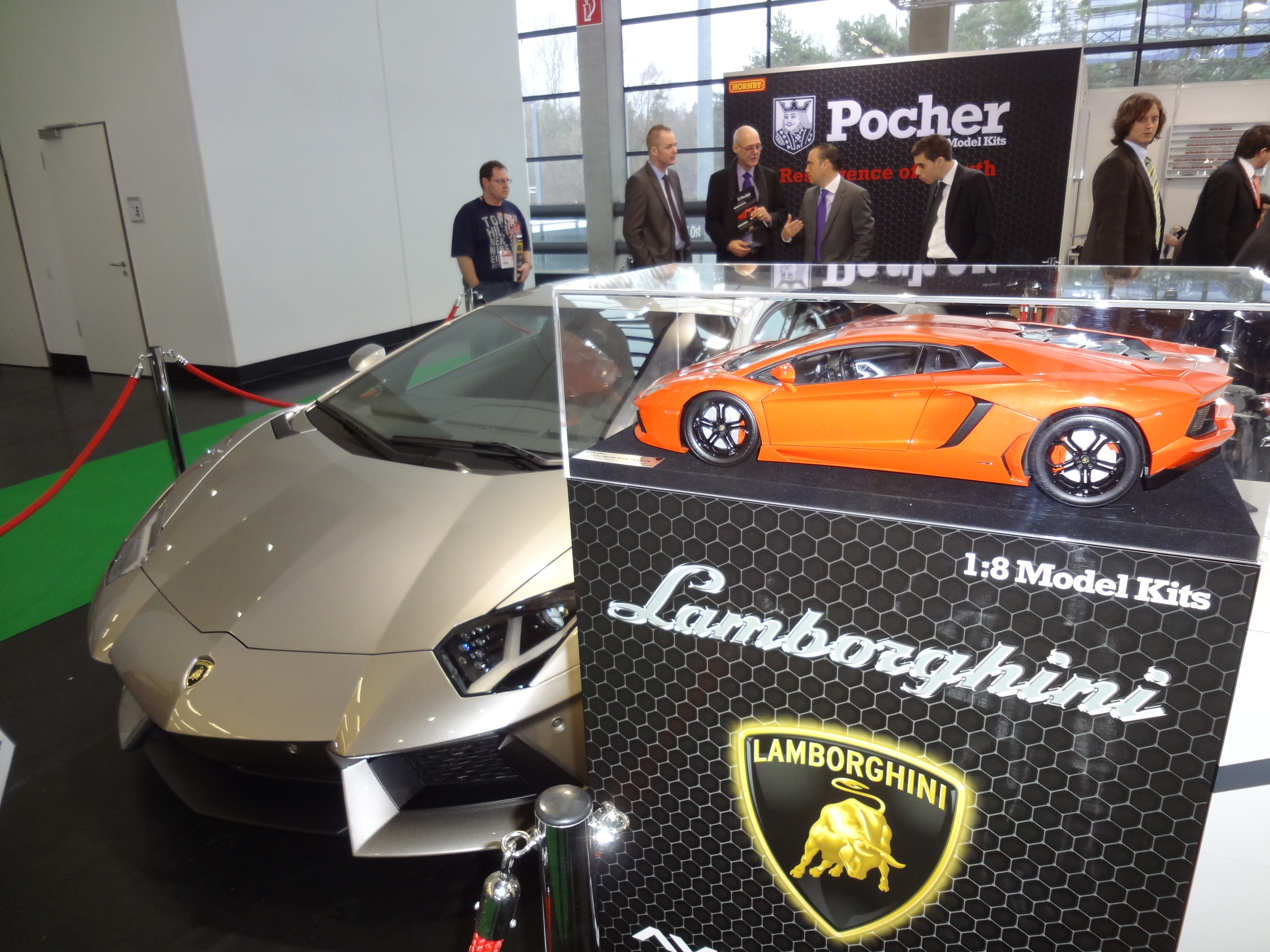
Lamborghini Aventador

Kit number	Maker	Model	Color
K30	Porsche	911	black
K31	Porsche	911 "Silver"	silver
K31 collco24	Porsche	911 "Silver Plated"	silver
K31 collco24	Porsche	911 "Cabrio"	silver
K32 collco24	Porsche	911 "Yellow"	Yellow
K33 collco24	Porsche	911 "Blue"	Blue
K34 collco24	Porsche	911 "Red"	Red
K35 collco24	Porsche	911 "Carrera Cup 1994"	Racing
K51	Ferrari	Testarossa Coupe	red
K52	Ferrari	Testarossa Spider	white
K53	Ferrari	Testarossa Coupe "Black Star"	black
K54	Ferrari	Testarossa Spider "Sportster"	red
K55	Ferrari	F40	red
K56	Ferrari	F40 "Yellow"	yellow
K57	Ferrari	F40 G.T (Dutch prototype)	red
K58	Ferrari	F40 G.T (Italian prototype)	red
K59	Ferrari	Testarossa Coupé Convertible	yellow
K60	Ferrari	F40 "Black Power"	black
K61	Ferrari	Testarossa Spider "Silver Special"	Silver
K63	Ferrari	Testarossa Coupe "Flashlight"	yellow

== Pocher Hornby model list ==
Kit number	Maker	Model	Color	
HK100	Lamborghini	Aventador Coupe	Argos orange	(discontinued)
HK101	Lamborghini	Aventador Coupe	Isis white	(discontinued)
HK102	Lamborghini	Aventador Coupe	Nero Nemesis Black	(available)
HK103	Lamborghini	Aventador Roadster	Blue Monterrey	(available)
HK104	Lamborghini	Aventador Roadster	Isis White	(available)
HK105	Lamborghini	Huracan	Isis White/Red	(available)
HK106	Lamborghini	Huracan	Yellow	(available)
HK107	Ducati Superbike	1299 Panigale S	Red	(discontinued)
HK109	Lamborghini	Huracan	Green	(available)
HK110	Ducati	1299 Panigale S Anniversario	Red/White/Black	(discontinued)
HK111	Ducati	1299 Panigale S "Carbon Edition"	Black/Gold/Red	(discontinued)
HK114	Lotus	72d	Black	(available)
HK117	Ducati	1299 Panigale R Final Edition	Green/White/Red	(available)
HK118	Porsche	917K - Gulf Edition	Blue/Orange/White	(available)
HK119	Lamborghini	Aventador LP 700-4 Giallo Orion	Yellow	(available)
HK121	Lamborghini	Aventador LP700-4 Roadster Nero Nemesis	Matte Black	(Unknown - eBay only?)

== Pocher Classic model list ==
Kit number	Maker	Model	Colour	Wheel Type	Like Model
K70	Fiat	Grand prix de France	red	Hard Plastic Spokes	
K71	Alfa Romeo	8c 2300 Monza	red	Spokes	
K72	Rolls-Royce	Sedanca Coupé Phantom II	black-blue	Spokes	
K73	Alfa Romeo	Spider Touring Gran Sport	cream-blue	Spokes	
K74	Mercedes-Benz	500K/AK Cabriolet	black	Spokes	K93
K75	Rolls-Royce	Torpedo Phantom II Convertible	silver – orange	Spokes	
K76	Bugatti	50T	black – yellow	Plastic	
K77	Fiat	F-2 Racer	black – red	Plastic	K88
K78	Alfa Romeo	8c 2300 Monza "Muletto"	white	Spokes	
K80	Mercedes-Benz	500K "Sport Roadster"	red	Spokes	
K81	Alfa Romeo	8C 2600 "Mille Miglia-Scuderia Ferrari"	red	Spokes	
K82	Mercedes-Benz	540K "Cabrio Special"	white	Spokes	K94
K83	Rolls-Royce	Phantom II Ambassador	green	Spokes	
K84	Bugatti	50 T Coupe de ville	blue-silver	Plastic	
K85	Mercedes-Benz	540K "Classic Roadster"	red	Spokes	
K86	Bugatti	50T Surprofilé	black-red	Plastic	
K88	Fiat	F-2 Racer	black- red	Hard Plastic Spokes	K77
K89	Alfa Romeo	8c 2300 Coupé Elegant	black-white	Spokes	
K90	Mercedes-Benz	540K "Rumble Seat"	maroon	Spokes	K95
K91	Mercedes-Benz	540K "True Roadster"	cream-brown	Plastic	
K92	Alfa Romeo	"Dinner Jacket"	black	Plastic	
K93	Mercedes-Benz	500K/AK Cabriolet	black	Plastic	K74
K94	Mercedes-Benz	540K Cabrio Special	white	Plastic	K82
K95	Mercedes-Benz	540K "Rumble Seat"	maroon	Plastic	K90

== Pocher truck model list ==
Kit number	Maker	Model	Color
K79	Volvo	F-12 Turbo Truck	red
K87	Volvo	F-16 Globetrotter	black

== Pocher engine model list ==
Kit number	Maker	Model
KM51	Ferrari	Testarossa
KM55	Ferrari	F-40
KM76	Bugatti	T50
KM87	Volvo	Truck
