= Hornby software =

Model railway software

Hornby released several pieces of software to complement their core business of model railways.

== Hornby Virtual Railway ==
Hornby Virtual Railway
- Developer: Hornby Hobbies
- Publisher: Hornby Hobbies
- Designer: Hornby Hobbies
- Platform: Windows
- Release: HVR1: EU: 7 June 2001; HVR2: EU: 2 June 2003
- Genres: Simulator, Planning Tool
- Mode: Single-player

Hornby Virtual Railway is a video game and model planning environment released for Microsoft Windows in 2001.

=== Gameplay ===
Players build a virtual model railway layout in realistic scenes, helping people to plan their real-life layout(s). Fixed track parts, rolling stock, scenery, building, tree and hills similar to a real life model railway. Users can also control the trains once the virtual railway is built and planned, leading to some people to call HVR a train simulator. Some advanced parts such as turntables are absent from the game, and all engines on the same track will all move at once, the same speed and direction, much like a real life DC model railway. Engines included in the first edition include the LNER Class A1/A3, the LNER Class A4, Smokey Joe and the Eurostar.

=== Hornby Virtual Railway (2001) ===
Hornby released the First Simulation/Game of the HVR series which was released on 7 June 2001.

=== Hornby Virtual Railway 2 (2003) ===
Hornby released Virtual Railway 2 (HVR2), 2 years after the original. The sequel was somewhat more realistic looking than its predecessor, and contained more elements to use such as scenery, new rolling stock, and new engines (includes Virgin 125). Also Download Stations, Locomotives, Rolling stock from www.hornby.com. Hornby Virtual Railway 2 was released on 2 June 2003.

== Hornby Track Master ==
Hornby Track Master
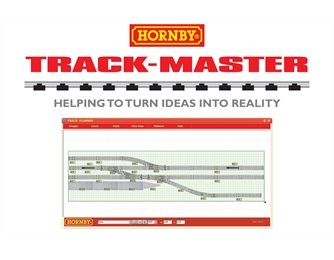
- Developer: Hornby Railways
- Release: 19 September 2011
- Platform: Microsoft Windows

Hornby Track Master is a software tool to design Hornby Railways train tracks.

=== Gameplay ===
Hornby Track-Master is a birds eye 2D Planning tool. Unlike HVR, Hornby Track-Master allows for the development of a shopping list for every thing needed to build a track, but it has no 3D views. Users select pieces of track from lists and place them where they wish. Track-Master uses birds-eye view to work. Track, platforms, turntables etc. can be added. Once completed the software develops a printable shopping list. (Note: A list of the parts needed for the layout designed by the user, including Hornby retail prices.)
