= Leeds Model Company =

Former railway company

The Leeds Model Company was a model railway company.

The company made o gauge wooden coaches and wagons with lithograph sides and a very large range of model locomotives as well as track and railway accessories. Their quality was equal to that of most other companies at the time, including Bassett Lowke and Hornby Trains, which in the UK were widely accepted as the leading model train companies of the 1920s and 1930s. Just before World War II they started manufacturing their coaches and wagons out of bakelite.

== History ==
Rex Stedman founded the Leeds Model Company (LMC) in 1912 but left it in 1928 to found a new company under the name of R.F. Stedman & Co. He later purchased the LMC company, continuing to trade under the R.F. Stedman name. Stedman finally left in 1931, when the name reverted to LMC. In 1953, LMC became Ellemsee Accessories and the company survived until 1966. The Leeds Stedman Trust was established in 1983 to keep the archives of the Leeds Model Company and R. F. Stedman & Company. Today the Trust provides a service of spares, repairs and technical advice to LMC enthusiasts and continues to promote interest in and appreciation of the products of The Leeds Model Company.
