= Rivarossi =

Italian manufacturer of model railways

- Industry: Hobbies
- Founded: 1945
- Headquarters: United Kingdom
- Products: Model Railways
- Parent: Hornby plc
- Website: uk.rivarossi.com

Rivarossi is an Italian manufacturer of model railways. In 2004 it was acquired by Hornby Railways.

== History ==
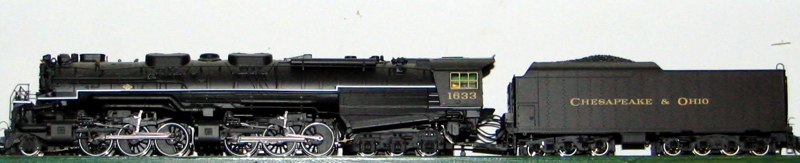
Rivarossi model of 2-6-6-6

Rivarossi was founded in 1945 by Antonio Riva and Alessandro Rossi. In the 1990s Rivarossi acquired Lima (1992), Jouef and Arnold (1997). In 2003 Rivarossi went into receivership.

In 2004 Hornby Railways plc acquired assets from Rivarossi, in particular the brands Arnold, Jouef, Rivarossi and Lima. Since 2006 products are sold again under these brand names. The production has been moved to China.

== United States ==
From 1957 Rivarossi HO models were licensed and sold by Lionel as Lionel HO. The cooperation with Lionel broke down over financial issues after only a year. From 1958 Rivarossi products were sold through Athearn. After Athearn, just about all Rivarossi products, and its sister company Pocher, were distributed through AHM (Associated Hobby Manufacturers).
