= Jouef =

French model railroading brand

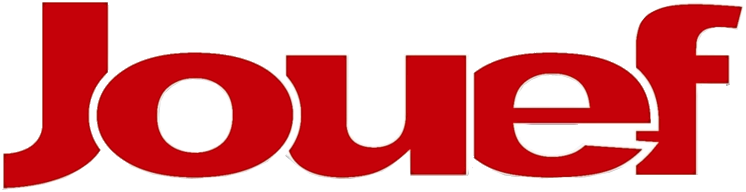
- Industry: Hobbies
- Founded: 1944
- Founder: Georges Huard
- Fate: Company defunct, became a brand
- Headquarters: Champagnole, France
- Products: Model railroads
- Owner: Hornby
- Website: fr.jouef.com

Jouef is a French brand and former manufacturing company specialized in scale model railroads. The brand name is currently owned by Hornby.

Apart from model railroads, the company also produced model cars and slot cars.

== History ==
Manufacturer Georges Huard founded Jouef in 1944 toward the end of World War II. The traditional home of the company was in Champagnole, France. In the early 1950s, as with many manufacturers, the company abandoned the use of lithographed tinplate for trains in favour of plastic injection moulding.

In 1979, Jouef opened a factory in Limerick, Ireland, but the ill-fated venture closed in 1981. In 2001, Jouef was subsumed by the Italian Lima. After Lima shut down in January 2004, the Jouef brand was acquired a few months later by Hornby Railways.

== Trains ==
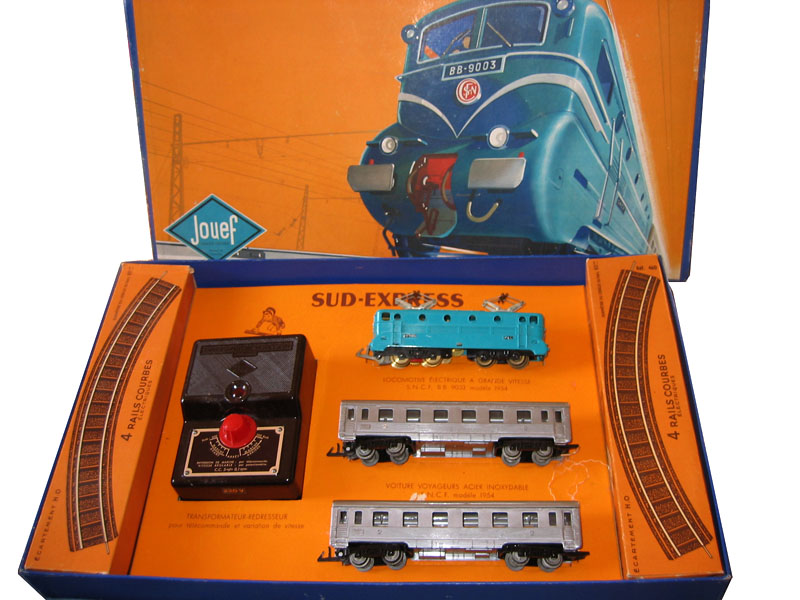
The first Jouef electric train in HO scale, 1955

The company's first offering was a rather toy-like tinplate 'Trans Saharan Express - Algiers to Tombouctou'. Other notable offerings were the French BB9200 which hauled the famous 'Le capitole' express. The locomotive had features like the overhead, diamond-shaped, pantograph completely detailed on the model'. Even today, as a part of Hornby, a main offering has been the French TGV high-speed express. Also during the 1960s, Jouef marketed a limited range of British outline model railways under the brand name 'Playcraft'.

== Cars ==
Around 1960, Jouef made a series of plastic 1:87 (HO) scale cars, trucks and buses mainly for display with its train kits. These were mainly French vehicles including a Peugeot 203 and 403, Simca Chambord, Citroen DS 19, and a few Renaults including the 16 hatchback. These were basic one-piece mouldings with simple plastic wheels.

Jouef made electric slot cars for many years with production starting in their Champagnole factory in 1963. The system was called "Record 64" in France. Between 1964 and 1968 these sets were marketed in England by Mettoy / Playcraft, the makers of Corgi Toys. The range was also made under license in Germany and known as Egger Silberpfeil. Jouef slot cars were also manufactured in Spain during the 1960s. Early releases were the E Type Jag sports and hardtop, Mercedes-Benz 300 SL sports and hardtop, BRM F1, BRM F1 chrome, Ferrari F1, Ferrari F1 gold, Lotus F1, Ferrari 250 GTO, Porsche 904 and Ford GT40. A 'Formulae Bleue' car was illustrated in the 1964 French catalogue, but was never released. After Jouefs' partnership with Playcraft and Egger ended in 1968, they continued to produce some very nice cars. Toward the end of production, however, cost saving measures became apparent.

From 1968 until 1980 Jouef produced variants of the following cars: Renault Alpine 3000, Matra Djet, Chaparral 2F, Mini Cooper, Renault 8 Gordini, Lotus F1 'Looping', Matra F1 'Looping', Lotus F1 front wing, Lotus F1 front & rear wing, Matra F1 front wing, Matra F1 front & rear wing, BRM F1 'Baby' (winged), Ferrari F1 'Baby' (winged), Drag Car, Go-Kart, Ford Capri, Renault 5, Porsche 917, Matra 650, 'Niki Lauda' Ferrari, Ligier JS1, Renault F1, Ligier JS11, Carabo Bertone, Alfetta GTV2000, Porsche Carrera Turbo, BMW 3.0 csl, Renault Alpine 1600, Fiat 131 Abarth, Alpine A442, Porsche 936, Matra Simca Bagheera, Renault Alpine A310, Porsche 911S and Lancia Stratos. Jouef ceased producing their own cars in 1980. A Renault 5 Turbo with flared arches and a 'Batwing' BMW were featured in the 1980 catalogue, but neither entered production.

Thereafter, Artin sold a budget range of slot cars under the Jouef brand name until the mid-1990s. Jouef slot cars and accessories produced in French factories between 1963 and 1980 have since become collectible, with some rarer liveries commanding higher prices among collectors.

During the 1990s, Jouef also made die cast cars in 1:18, 1:24, and 1:43 scales under the name "JouefEvolution". The car models were most often made in China, though train production continued in France. The 1:43 scale series was called 'Legende' and cars included a 1973 Porsche 911 Carrera, Ferrari 330 P4 Prototype racer, a Ferrari NART 412P Prototype racer, 250 Ferraris, a 1961 Ferrari 250 GT Berlinetta in Le Mans and Tour de France liveries, a 1964 Ferrari 250 GTO, a Ferrari 288 GTO Evoluzione, a Ford GT, a 1965 Mustang, a 1994 Ford Mustang, an MGB ragtop, a Triumph TR3 and a 1978 Volkswagen Beetle.

Proportions on these 1990s cars were spot-on (pun partially intended) and detail was exquisite. Engine features were realistic, wheels with their precise metal shades and textures often looked just like they had been taken off the real car and put into a 'miniaturizing' machine. Even on opening doors, window frames were made of thin metal, precision not often seen in 1:43 scale.

Most of these castings, like the 1973 Porsche 911 Carrera RS 2,7 litre or the many variations of the Ford GT race car, were later acquired by Universal Hobbies of Kowloon, Hong Kong and marketed during the late 1990s as the Eagle's Race line, which featured a silver chrome-like Eagle on the company logo. They were almost identical to the Jouef offerings.
