= Arnold (models) =

Toy company

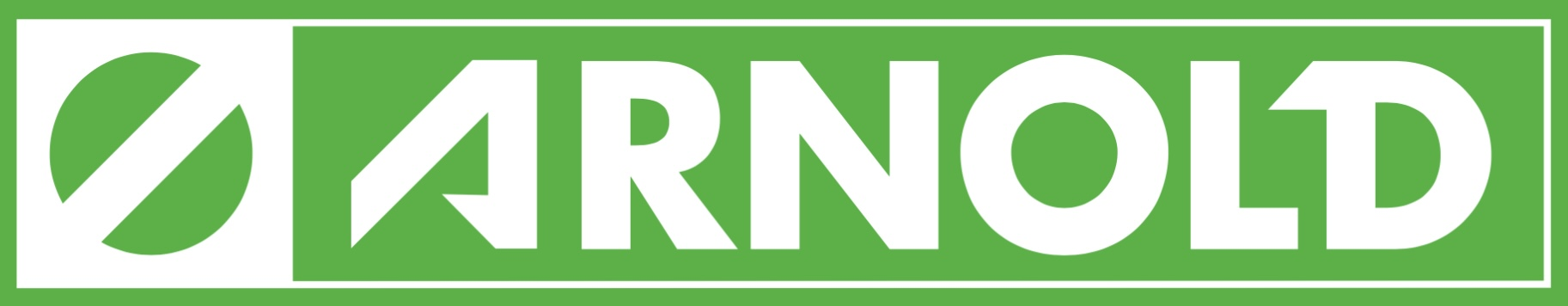
- Industry: Hobbies
- Founded: 1906
- Headquarters: United Kingdom
- Products: Model Railways
- Parent: Hornby plc
- Website: arnoldmodel.com

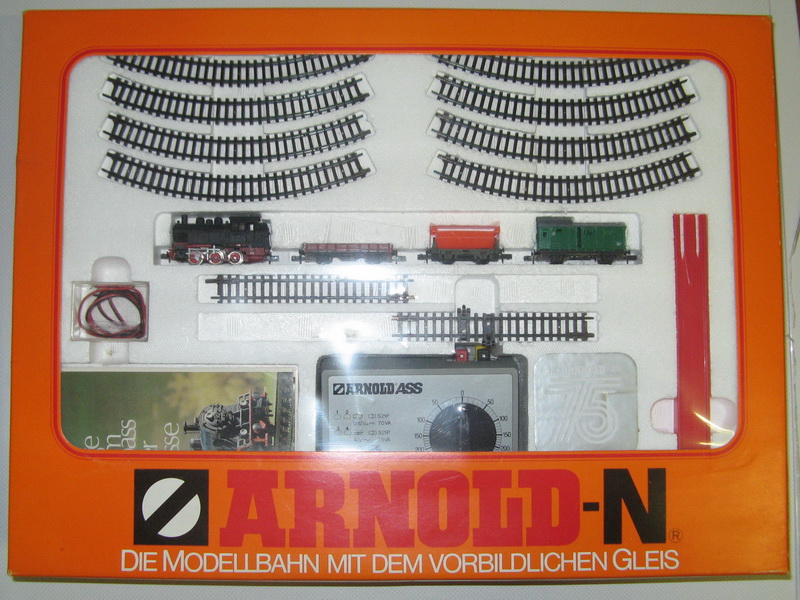
Arnold-N

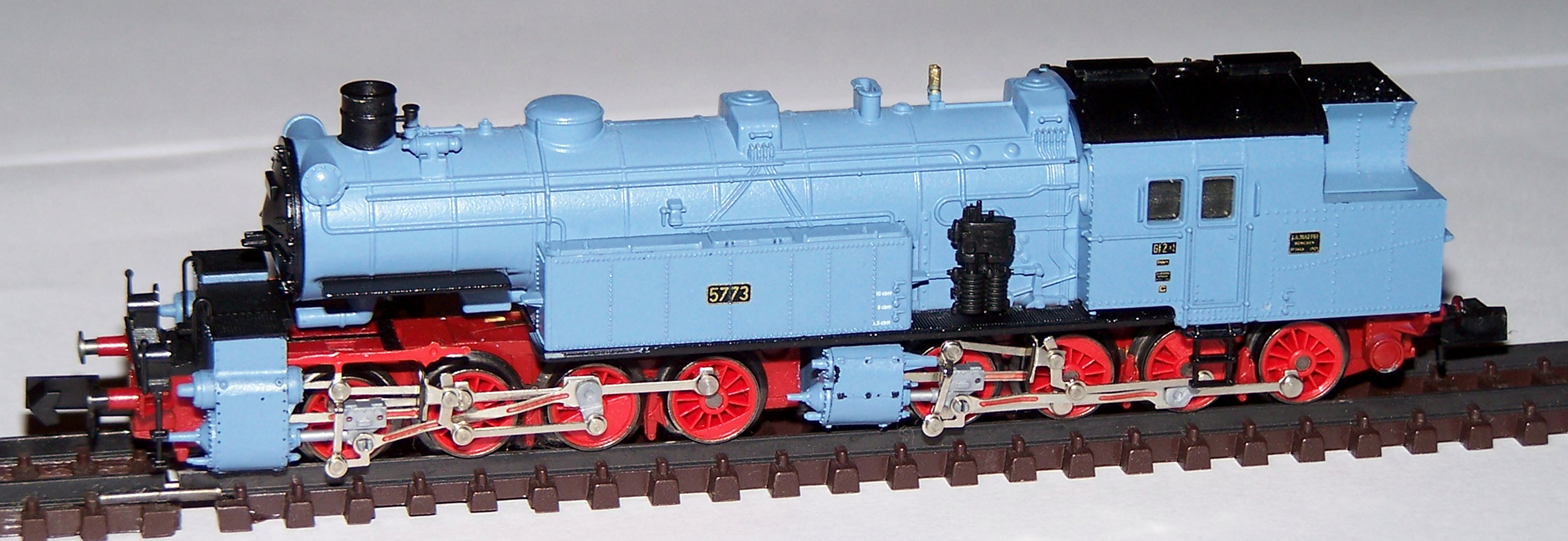
BR 96 023 (Gt 2×4/4)

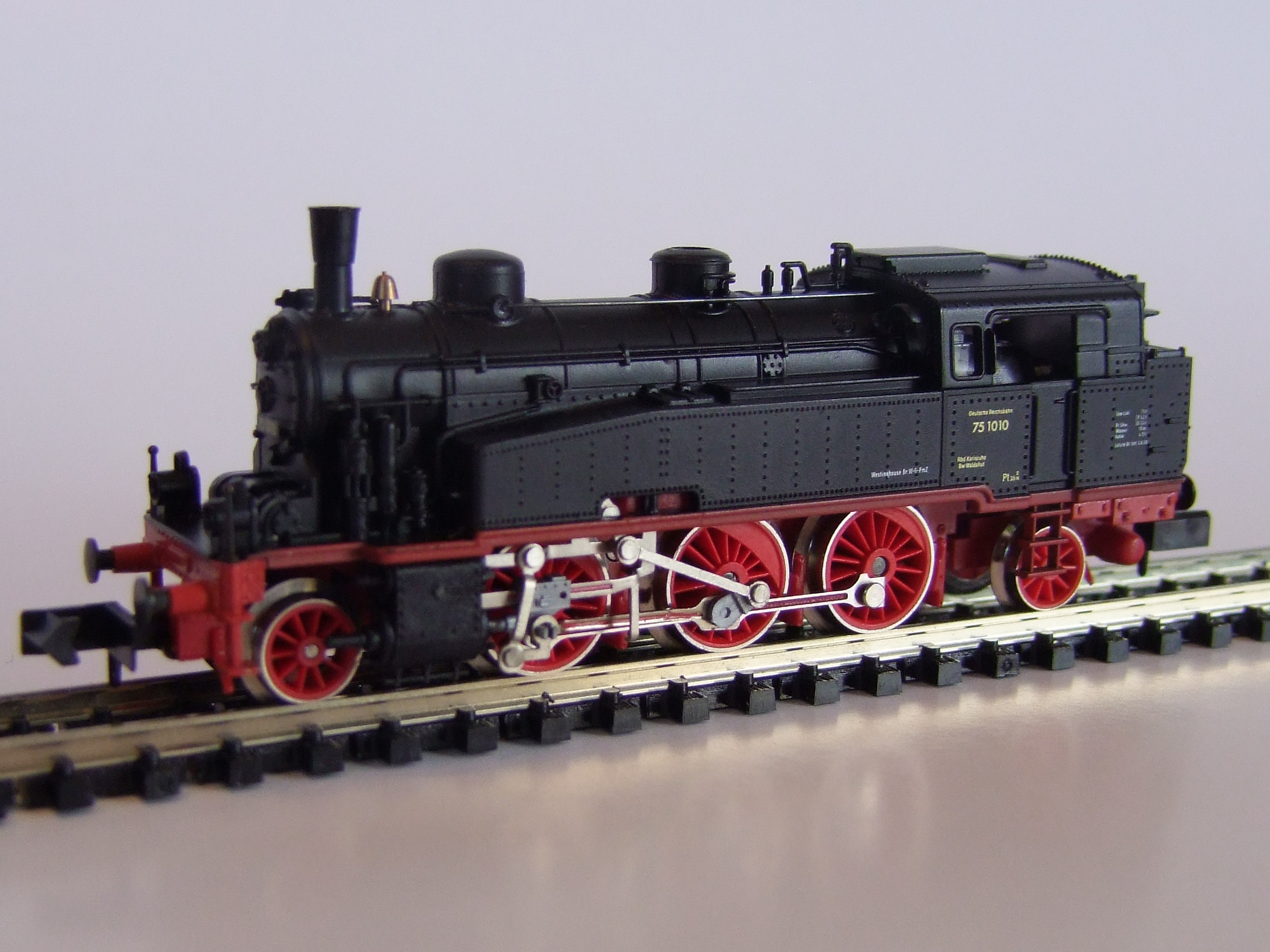
DRG BR 75 Ep. II

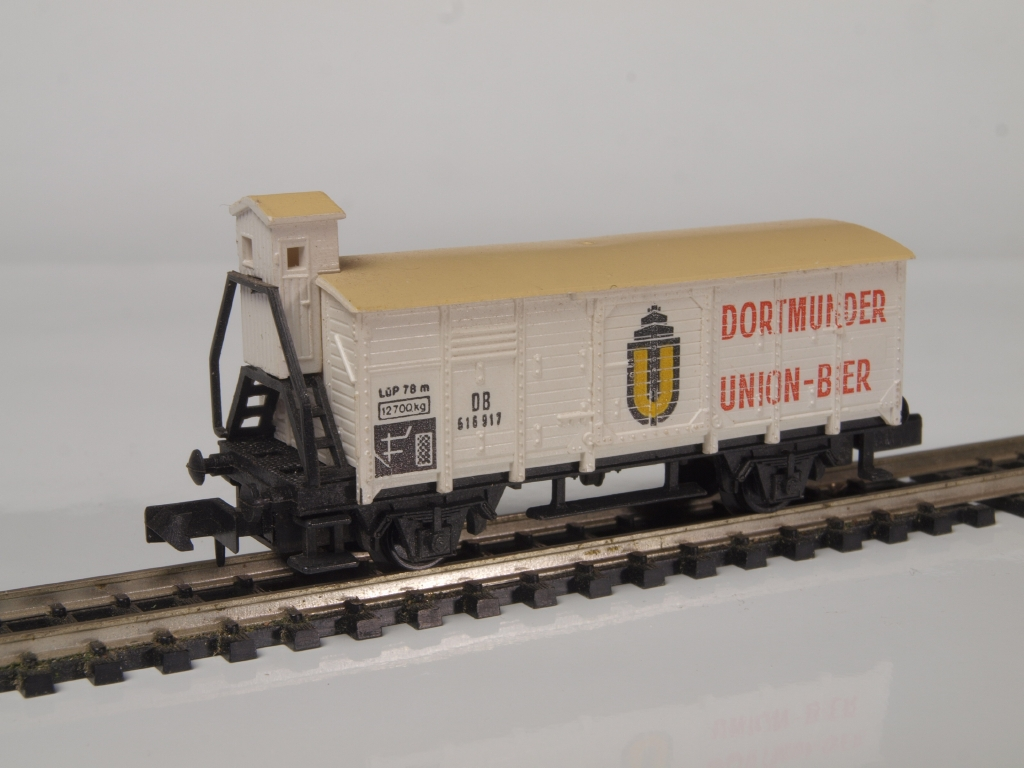
Goods wagon

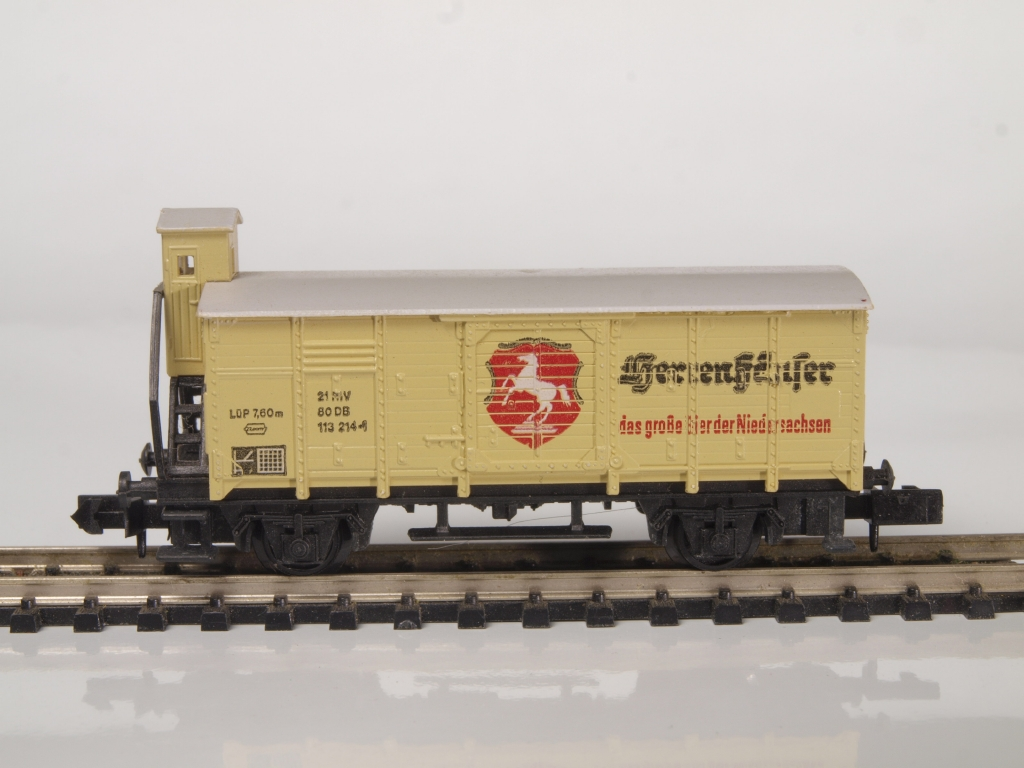
Goods wagon

Founded in 1906 by Karl Arnold in Nürnberg, K. Arnold & Co. began its life producing tin toys and related items. They produced an extensive line of model ships, doll house items and other toys. In 1935, K. Arnold & Co. hired Max Ernst as their managing director. Ernst, not to be confused with the German realist artist of the same name, was a significant factor in the future of Arnold.

== History ==
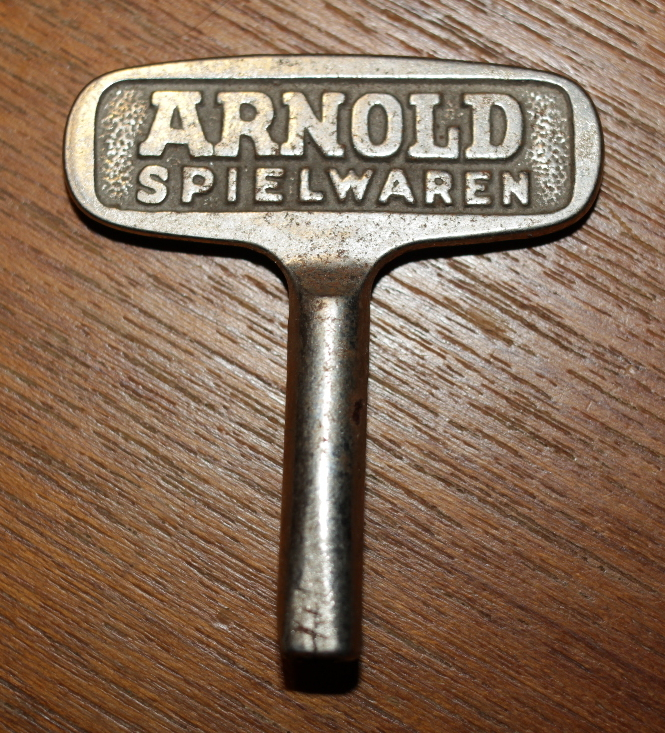
Key for mechanical toys.

Nürnberg was badly damaged by allied bombers during World War II, and, at the end of the war, all of the Arnold facilities were in ruins. Postwar production continued at a facility in the Upper Palatinate (Oberpfalz), with the company beginning its slow recovery with the manufacture of window hardware. The postwar operation of the company was under the direction of Max Ernst and Ernst Arnold, son of Karl Arnold. The factory buildings in Nürnberg were rebuilt and the Arnold Company continued to grow.

In the postwar period, smaller model train sizes became the order of the day. In earlier times, model trains had been largely the plaything of the well to do who had enough money to live in houses large enough to support the display of the larger scales of model trains. The growth toward smaller scales had begun in the early 1900s, with O scale being the first "small" scale. In the 1930s, HO/OO scale became the "small" scale. In the late 1940s and 1950s, TT scale was the "small" scale, allowing for realistic model railroad displays being situated in relatively small areas. Three companies led the TT revolution, H.P. Products of Indiana, United States, Tri-ang of the United Kingdom, and Rokal of West Germany.

But TT-Scale was not to be the smallest scale in model railroading. Led initially by Lone Star Toys of Great Britain and Trix of Nürnberg, there was a movement toward an even smaller scale. Both companies experimented earlier with "floor toys", unpowered model trains designed to be moved about by child power. Lone Star dropped by the wayside after a period of time, but Trix continued experimentation and development of what would be their electric powered Minitrix product line. Arnold was to come up with a workable solution, also. The introduction of Arnold rapido was from scratch because nothing like this had been done before. Arnold was literally establishing what would become N scale. This is not to say that it was the sole developer of N, but Arnold Rapido was there first.

Although Karl Arnold's son, Ernst, was involved with the company, several sources cite the presence of Max Ernst (who remained as Managing Director for over forty years until 1976), as the prime mover behind this new product line. Ernst has been described as a dynamic businessman, the person most responsible for the introduction of the Arnold Rapido product line. Karl Arnold passed on in October, 1946, leaving his son and Herr Ernst as principals in the Company. Much later, an Arnold Sales Manager, Ferdinand Graef, would marry Max Ernst's daughter, Sonja, keeping the Arnold company as a family operation. It would continue to be so until 1995.

== Production phases ==
There are several distinct phases of Arnold's model train production. In the period of 1960 - 1962, Arnold marketed the Arnold Rapido 200 product line; this line was very crude yet it also was a sensation because of its much smaller size than TT.

The next phase was from 1963–1967, when the rapido product line begins to swing toward scale representations of the trains. It is during this period that the "Rapido Coupler" comes into production, beginning its widespread use by all model train manufacturers in N-Scale. It was in 1964 that the term "N-Scale" came into use. Between 1968 and 1970, rapido line of trains reached maturity, notably with its turntable and roundhouse. Arnold entered into a business relationship with the U.S. company Revell around 1968, beginning the marketing of Revell Rapido model trains. This relationship was marked by the beginning of production of more accurate North American prototype models by Arnold. This relationship continued for several years, ending in the late 1960s or early 1970s. Arnold continued their expanded production, with new models until the early 1990s.

== Transfer of assets ==
On Max Ernst's 1976 retirement, Arnold employed perhaps 200 to 250 people, using three facilities in the Nürnberg area. The Company continued under family control until 1995, when Arnold went into bankruptcy and was sold to Rivarossi of Italy. Rivarossi, in turn, also went bankrupt, leading to the sale of all assets to Hornby of the United Kingdom. Production is now carried out in the People's Republic of China.
