= Hornby Railways =

British model railway manufacturer

Hornby Hobbies Limited

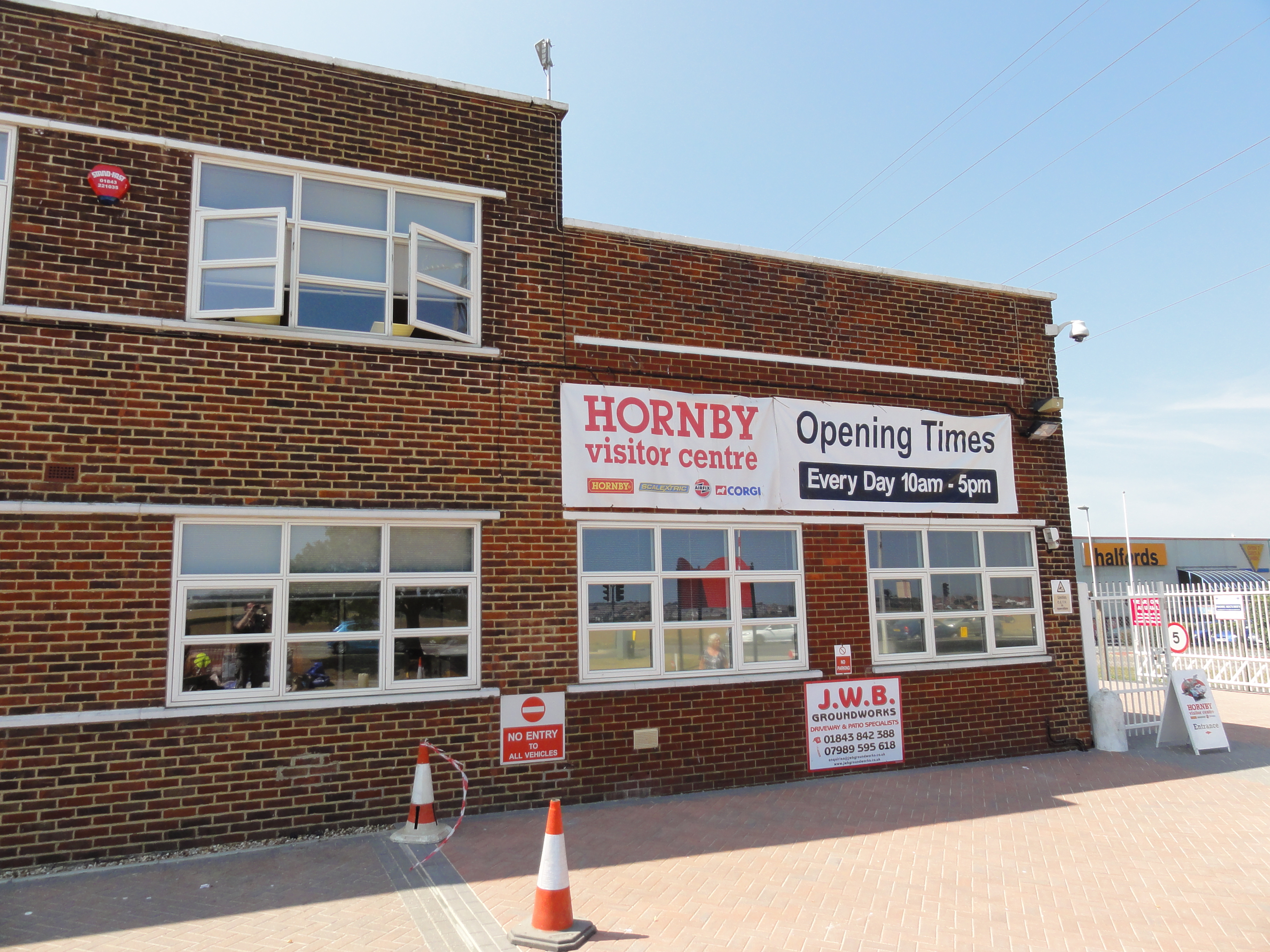
- Hornby visitor centre in Margate, UK
- Formerly: List: Hornby Dublo (1938–63); Hornby Railways (1972–80); Hornby Hobbies Limited (1980–2015)
- Type: Private (1901–64, 2025–) Subsidiary (1964–80) Public (1980–2025)
- Industry: Scale model
- Founded: 1901; 125 years ago
- Founder: Frank Hornby
- Fate: Acquired by Tri-ang Railways in 1964, then other takeovers
- Headquarters: Margate, Kent, England
- Products: Model railways; Model cars; Slot cars
- Brands: List: Bassett-Lowke; Corgi; Jouef; Lima; Pocher; Scalextric; Airfix; Humbrol; Rivarossi; Arnold; Electrotren
- Revenue: £37.8 million (2020)
- Operating income: £200,000 (2020)
- Net income: -£2.8 million (2020)
- Number of employees: 191 (2020)
- Parent: Phoenix Asset Management (2017–present)
- Website: uk.hornby.com

Hornby Hobbies Limited is a British scale model manufacturing company; the name is particularly associated with its model railways. Its roots date back to 1901 in Liverpool, when founder Frank Hornby received a patent for his Meccano construction toy. The first clockwork train was produced in 1920. In 1938, Hornby launched its first OO gauge train.

In 1964, Hornby and Meccano were in financial difficulties and were bought by a competitor Lines Brothers (Tri-ang Railways), the railway brand becoming "Tri-ang Hornby". Hornby Railways became independent again in the 1980s, and became listed on the London Stock Exchange, but due to financial troubles reported in June 2017, became majority owned by British turnaround specialist Phoenix Asset Management.

Hornby Hobbies bought model paint manufacturer Humbrol and their scale model kit subsidiary Airfix in 2007. The die-cast model car brand Corgi was added in 2008.

Hornby's other brands include for model railways Bassett-Lowke, Jouef, Lima, Rivarossi , and Electrotren, and for large scale car model kits, Pocher. Formerly, it also owned the scale car racing company Scalextric.

== History ==
=== Early history: 1920–1938 ===
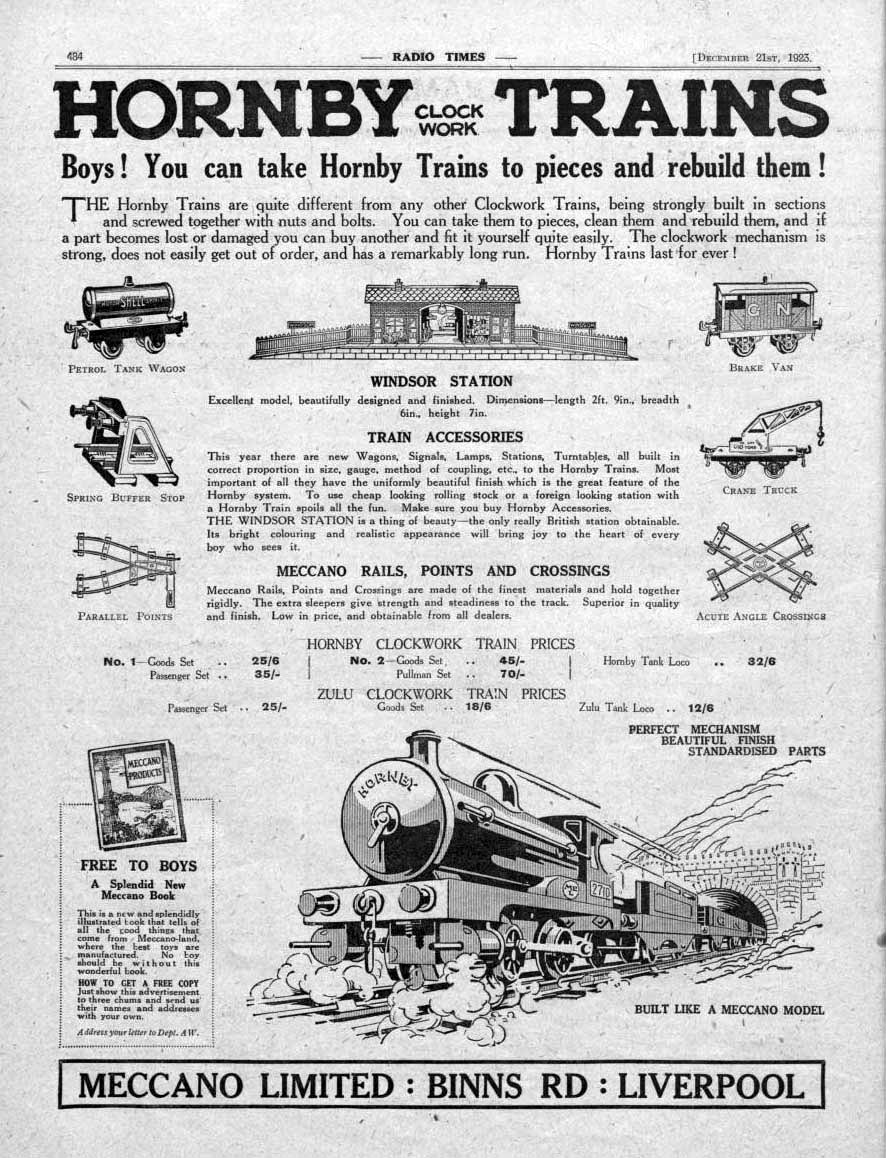
A Hornby Clockwork Trains advertisement, from 21 December 1923 issue of The Radio Times

Hornby was at first a trade name for the railway productions of Meccano Ltd and based around Liverpool. Until 1907 the company produced under the name of Mechanics made easy. Hornby released its first train, a clockwork 0 gauge (1:48) model, in 1920. An electric train soon followed but was under-designed, and the few that were made were sold in France. In 1925, a much more successful electric model was introduced, operating on the high voltage of 110 volts AC power.

Safety concerns saw low-voltage 4 V and then 6 V motors introduced, followed by a reliable 20 V AC system, which was developed in the early 1930s. However, clockwork remained the mainstay of the Hornby 0-gauge trains until 1937 and became the only power available in Liverpool-made 0-gauge trains from 1949. Competitors in the UK were Leeds Model Company and Bassett-Lowke.

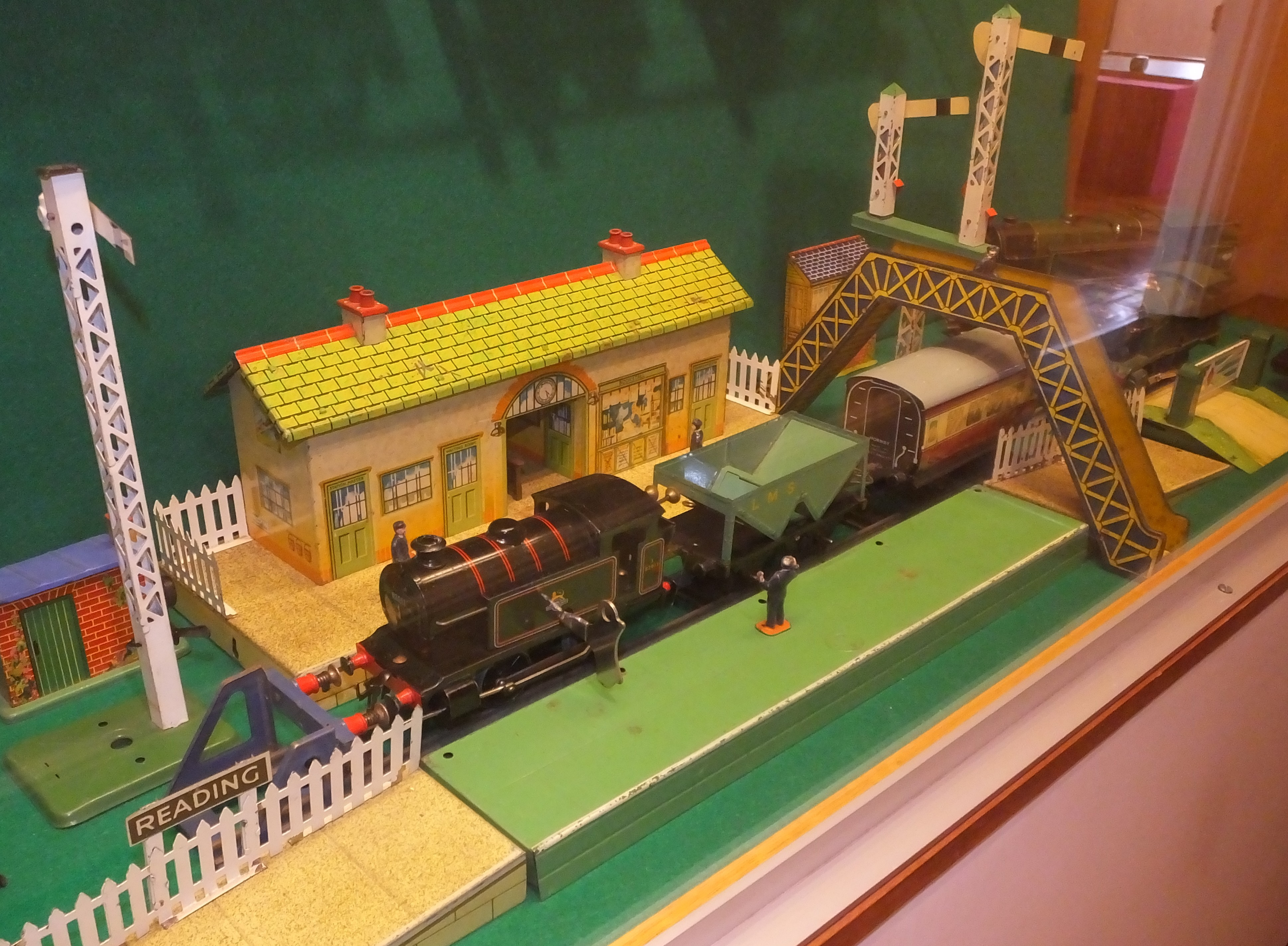
Hornby O-gauge tinplate models

A factory was established in France, which developed its own range of French outline trains, but Liverpool dominated export activity elsewhere, with large numbers of Hornby trains exported to Australia, New Zealand, Argentina and Scandinavia. Even though the export models were often painted in 'foreign' liveries, Hornby trains looked very British. Hornby attempted to break into the American market by setting up a factory in 1927 in Elizabeth, New Jersey, to make American-style trains.

These were colourful and attractive, but low-market and only clockwork. They probably would have failed in the marketplace because several established U.S. firms could undercut them and Hornby offered no better-class goods or electric models, but the Wall Street crash precipitated matters. In late 1929, Meccano Ltd. sold its New Jersey factory to the A. C. Gilbert Company, and Hornby trains had vanished from the U.S. market by 1930. The leftover inventory was sold in Canada and in the UK and some of the tooling was reused for products in other markets.

=== Hornby Dublo era: 1938–1963 ===
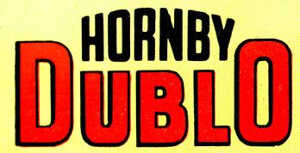
"Hornby Dublo" logo, 1956–1961

Meccano introduced its OO scale trains in 1938 under the name 'Hornby Dublo'. The locomotives were diecast metal, and the carriages and wagons were generally made of tinplate. This was a very well planned range of electric and clockwork models, successfully consolidating 12 V DC as the standard for OO scale. This led to the adoption of OO as a broadly accepted modelling standard in the UK, whereas much of the rest of the world adopted HO scale. As for their O gauge locomotives, electric Hornby Dublo locomotives ran on a third rail electric system with the track built on a pressed tinplate base.

Both OO and HO use the same track gauge, but their scales are different. Beginning as literally "half O gauge", the HO models of continental prototypes at 3.5 mm/foot (1:87) scale were workable but Hornby chose to slightly increase the scale to 4 mm/foot for the smaller British prototypes, to provide more internal space for a motor. This has had the effect, remaining to this day, of making their gauge an apparent 4 ft 1 1/2 in (1,257 mm) rather than the true 4 ft 8 1/2 in (1,435 mm) standard gauge.

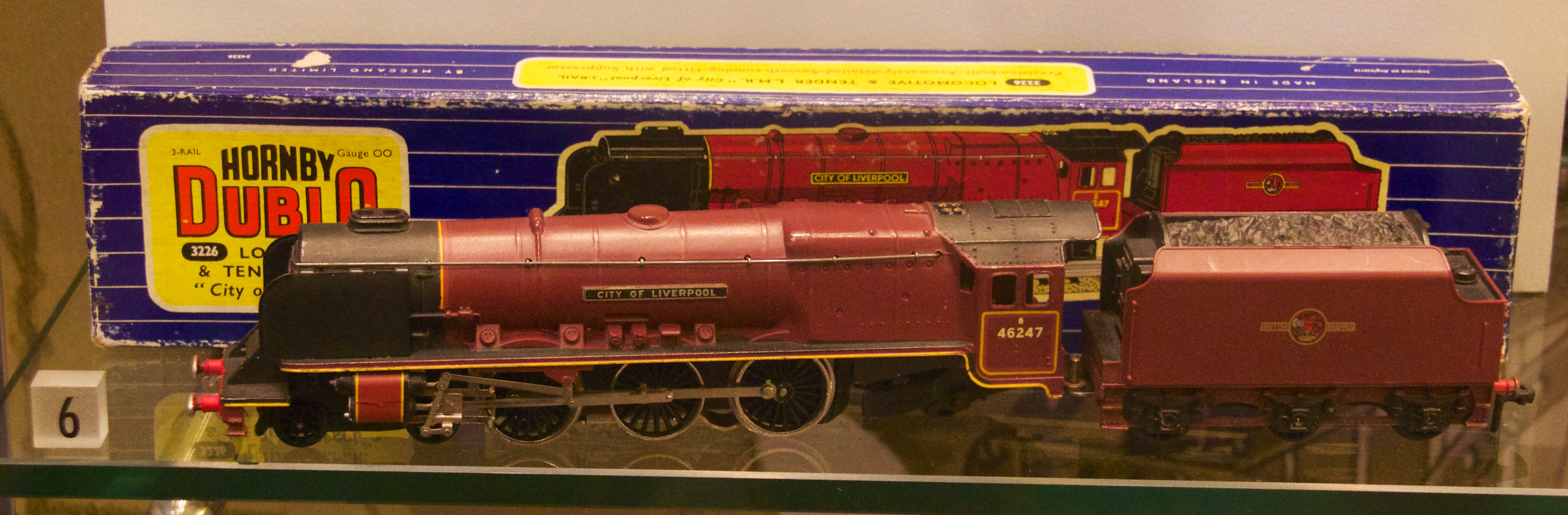
Hornby Dublo model of an LMS Coronation locomotive City of Liverpool

The range expanded quickly, but was curtailed from 1940 due to World War II, production being completely suspended in 1942. Production resumed after the war but did not reach full capacity until 1948. Clockwork models were not produced in 00 scale after the war.

In 2008, a special commemorative model of LNER Class A4 4498 Sir Nigel Gresley was produced, in period packaging, to celebrate the 70th anniversary of this introduction.

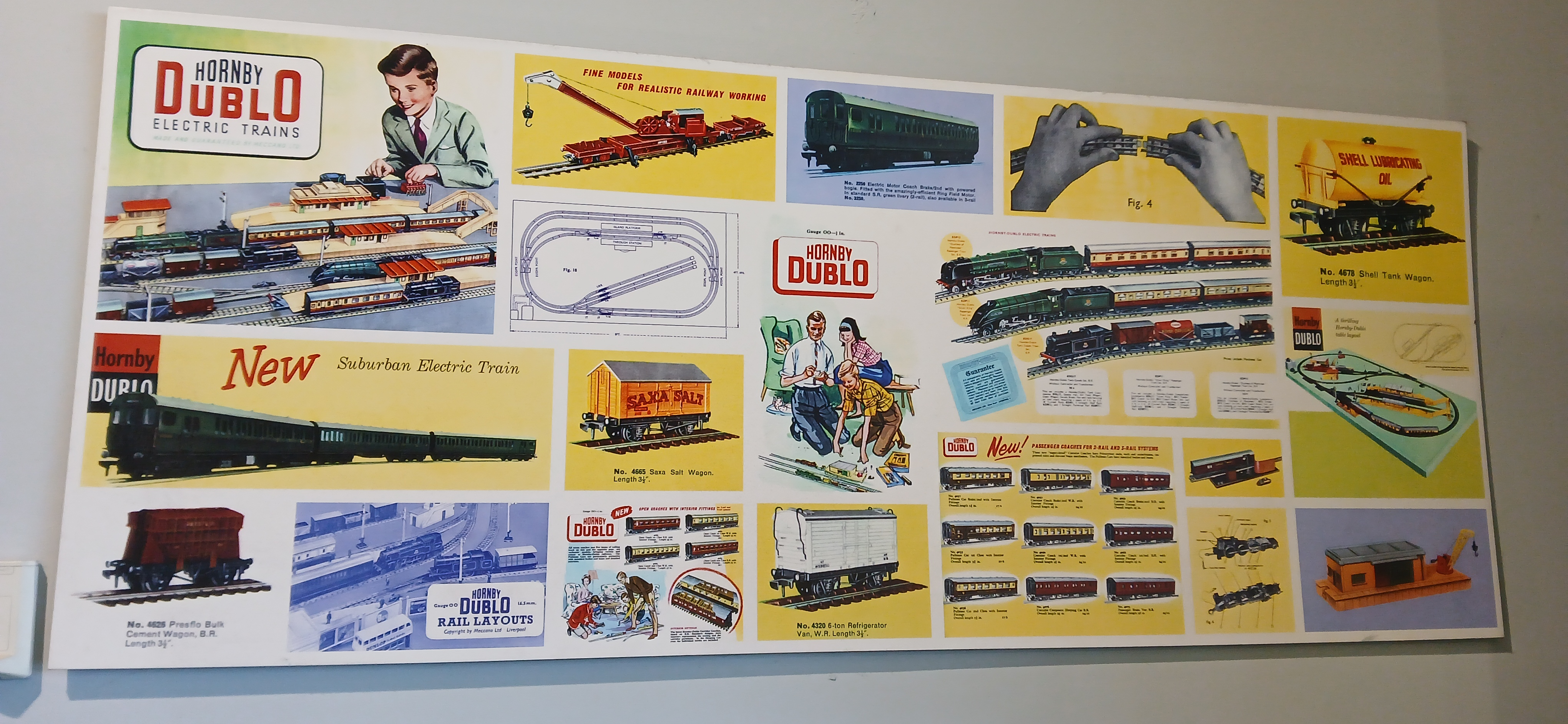
A Hornby dublo poster as seen at Locomotion, Shildon

Like its counterparts Bassett-Lowke and Exley in the UK and Lionel and American Flyer in the US, Hornby thrived in the first half of the 1950s but struggled in the second half of the decade. The company was slow to recognise the threat posed by rival manufacturers (particularly Triang-Rovex) and to realise the potential of plastic. In 1959, far too late, Hornby introduced two-rail track and moulded plastic rolling stock (the Super Detail series), but even then the system was complicated and difficult to use in comparison to its rivals.

With the benefit of hindsight, the policy of keeping the faith with its existing three-rail users whilst bringing the two-rail system to the market was a mistake that cost the company dearly. Whilst all the newer plastic-wheeled rolling stock was compatible with either system, the locomotives (and track) most definitely were not, requiring the two parallel productions of practically every locomotive (Note: With the exception of the very first two-rail locomotive, a Southern Region R1 0-6-0 tank engine; the later E3002 AL1 Bo-Bo electric locomotive was ordinarily two-rail only but three-rail ones were made to special order.) in the range to be offered in both formats. Meanwhile, the company persisted in producing a range of very old-fashioned 0 gauge models, in 1957 completely retooling much of the range instead of taking the opportunity to discontinue it, indicative of major failings at management level.

=== Tri-ang Hornby: 1964–1972 ===
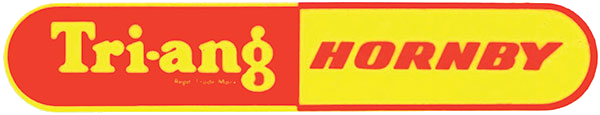
Logo, 1966–1972

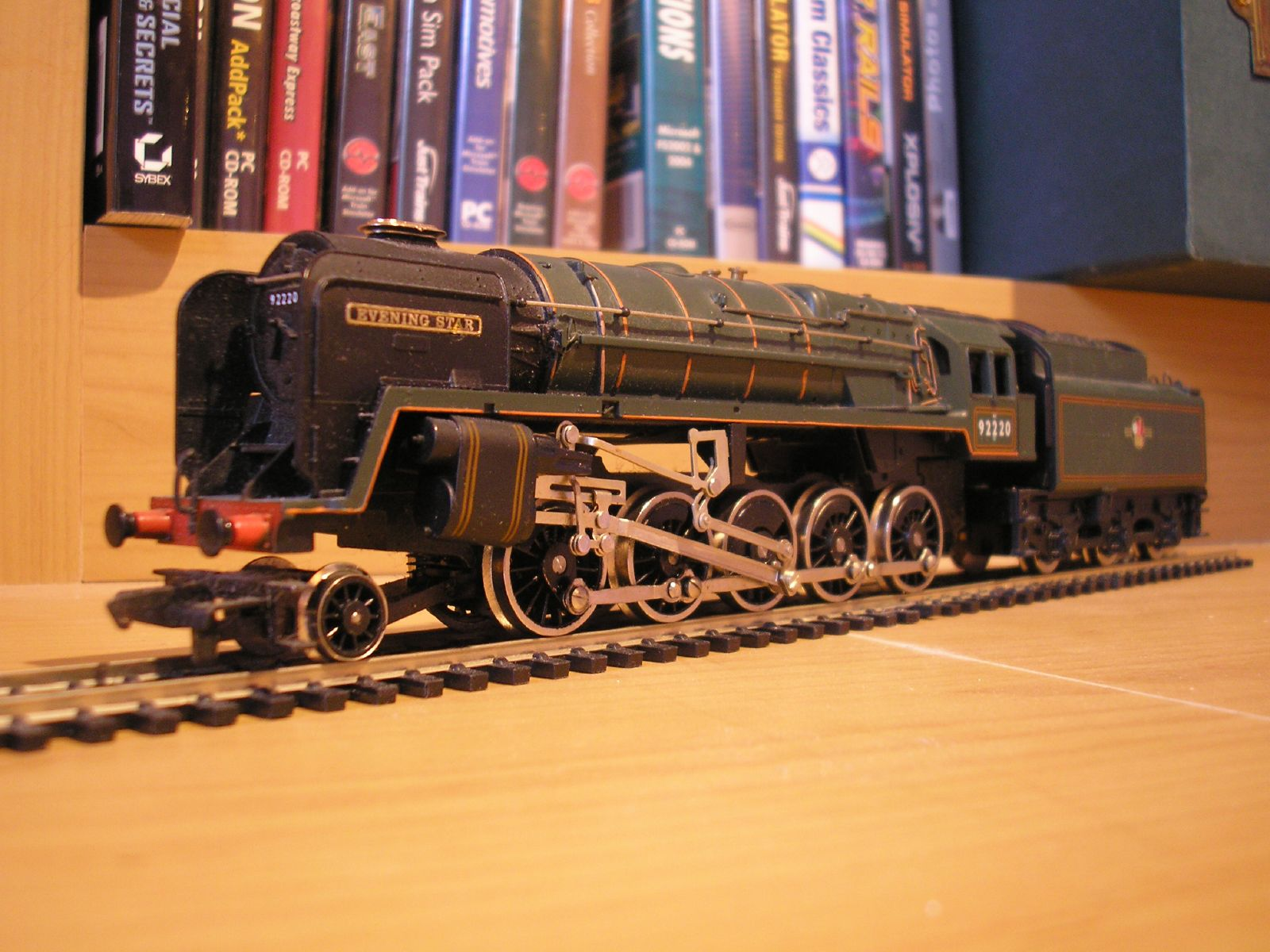
A Hornby model of a BR standard class 9F

In 1964, Lines Bros Ltd., the parent company of rival Tri-ang Railways, purchased Meccano Ltd., and merged Hornby and Tri-ang into Tri-ang Hornby. The former Hornby line was discontinued in favour of Tri-ang's less costly plastic designs. The Hornby Dublo tooling was sold to G & R Wrenn, which continued to make most of the loco range and 'superdetail' rolling stock. Remaining stocks of 0 gauge were either scrapped or sold to the local retailer Hattons Model Railways; it took Hattons about 30 years to sell off the stock.

=== Hornby Railways: 1972–1980 ===
Logo, 1978–1996

The Tri-ang group was disbanded in 1971 when Meccano Ltd's owner Lines Bros. filed for bankruptcy. The former Tri-ang Hornby was sold to Dunbee-Combex-Marx, becoming Hornby Railways in 1972. By 1976 Hornby was facing challenges from Palitoy and Airfix, both of which were producing high quality detailed models. Detail on the models was upgraded to make the product line more attractive to adult hobbyists.

==== Zero 1 ====
A digital model railway control system named Zero 1 was introduced in late 1979. The Zero 1 system enabled the simultaneous control of up to 16 locomotives and up to 99 accessories such as points and signals.

Zero 1 was based on digital, not analogue, technology. This really was the first digital system and as such was a forerunner to the Märklin Digital which appeared in the mid-1980s and the National Model Railroad Association (NMRA) Digital Command Control (DCC) system, which appeared around 1990 and was standardized internationally in the mid-1990s.

Although an important milestone, Zero 1 was not a lasting success. The Master Control unit last appeared in the catalog in 1985. The slave controller, the locomotive module, and the accessory module were still available until the late 1980s. The system is still used today by many modellers, highlighted by the demand on such sites like eBay for the items in the secondhand market. The Main Master unit was discontinued in 1986. The last time Loco Modules were listed was in the 1991 catalogue 'Limited supplies of R955 Loco module are available'. Repairs to Zero 1 units were no longer undertaken by Hornby apparently due to 'Lack of available parts required'.

Despite being on the market for a short time, Zero 1 had the largest installed base among command control systems in the early 1980s in North America, according to a reader survey done by Model Railroader magazine.

==== Rocket ====
As part of the 1980 Rocket 150 celebrations, Hornby released a live steam-powered 3 1/2 in (89 mm) gauge locomotive, a model of Stephenson's Rocket A major goal was to make real live steam accessible to an indoor domestic environment. The boiler was considerably smaller than the external diameter, surrounded by a thick insulating jacket to prevent burns.

It was fuelled by butane gas, from cigarette lighter refills. To provide more torque from the small cylinders, gearing was adeptly hidden between the cranks and the wheels. The track was of asymmetric moulded plastic units, representing the fishbelly rails of the period. These could be assembled either way round, to give either curved or straight track.

By 1980, the market was extremely tough and Dunbee-Combex-Marx was liquidated, placing Hornby in receivership.

=== Hornby Hobbies Limited: 1980–2015 ===
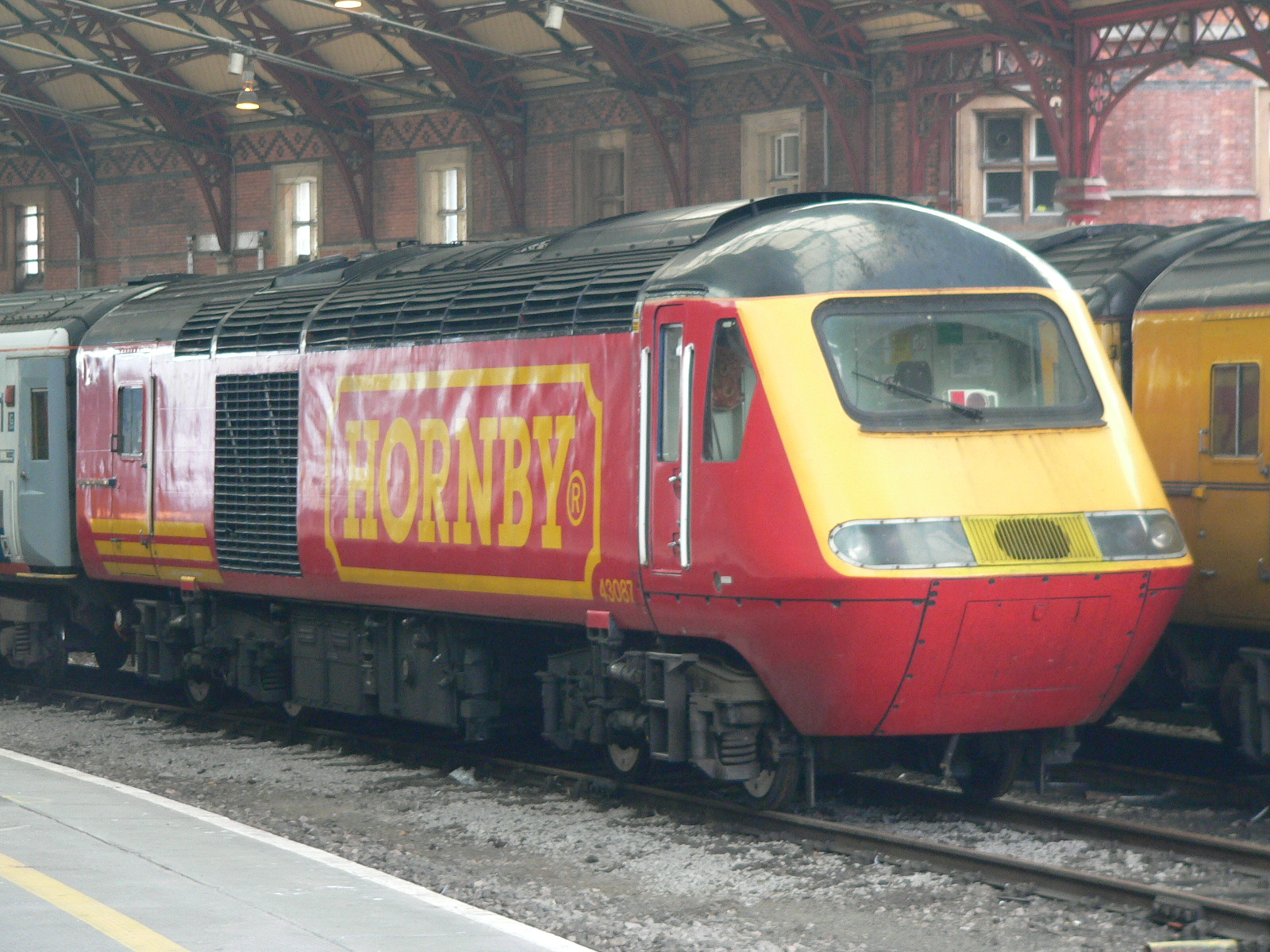
In 2006 a Cotswold Rail Class 43 HST power car carried a livery advertising Hornby. It has since been repainted.

In 1980, Hornby became Hornby Hobbies and in 1981 a management buyout saw the company back on a sound footing. It went public in 1986.

By the early 1990s Hornby again faced competition from newcomers such as Dapol (established 1983) and established foreign manufacturers, including Lima and Bachmann Industries. Manufacturing was moved to Guangdong province in China in 1995, completed by 1999, in a cost-cutting exercise.

As part of the process Hornby also bought in some of Dapol's products and also some of the old Airfix moulds, (Note: Airfix had both a 'Ready to Run' range introduced in the mid 1970s sold to Palitoy in 1981 and a scale model kit range from 1957 (which included the former Kitmaster brand in the 1960s) sold to Dapol in 1984) which had been bought by Dapol as part of the Mainline range from Palitoy in 1985. Train sets based on Thomas the Tank Engine and Friends and Harry Potter (the "Hogwarts Express") have been particularly profitable ventures. In September 2003 Hornby released its first steam-powered 00 gauge locomotive, a model of the record-breaking Mallard. Several other "Live Steam" locomotives have now been produced.

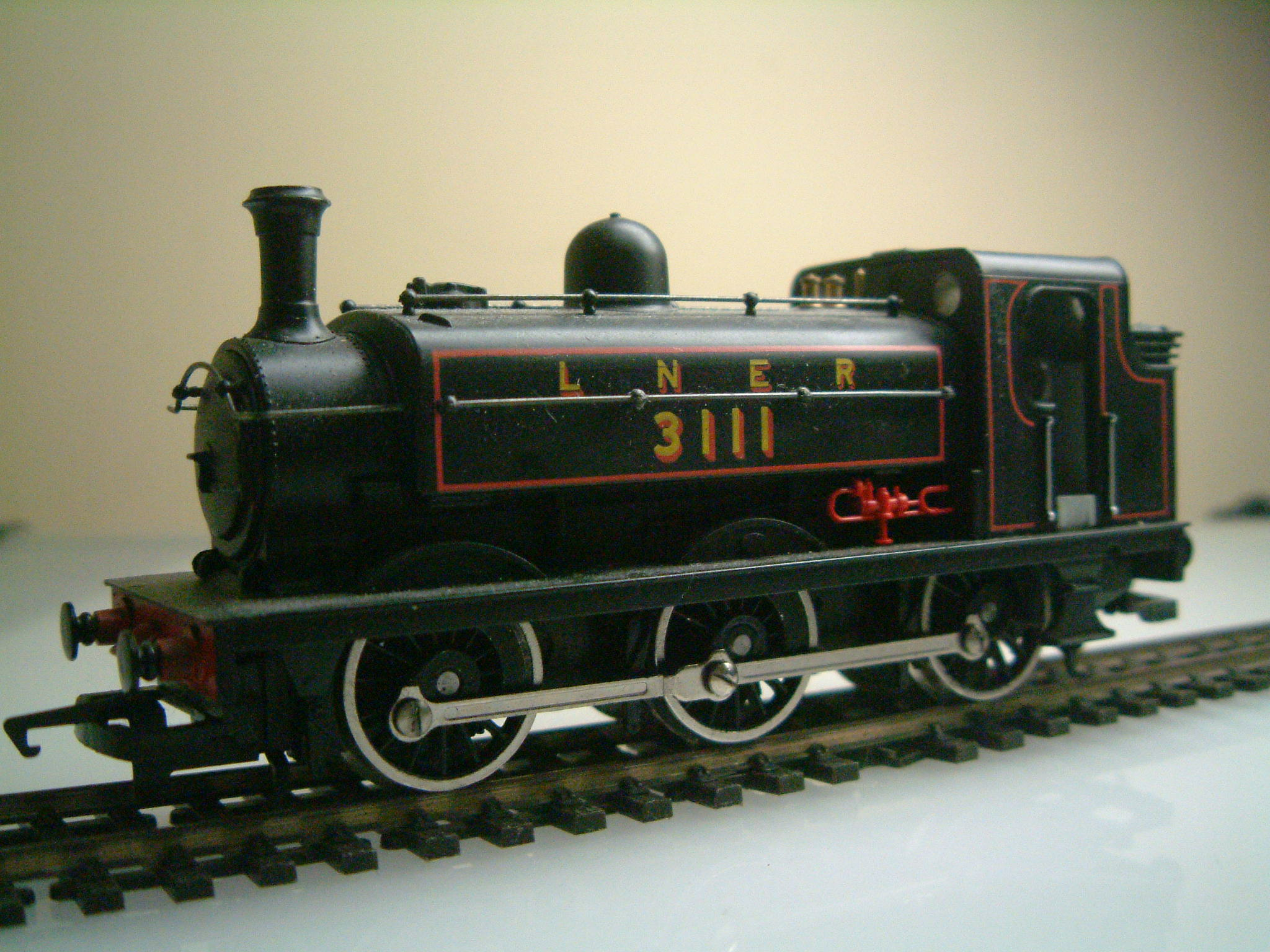
A GNR Class J13 model of this period

Hornby bought Lima, an Italian model railway equipment manufacturer that had previously acquired Jouef, a French manufacturer. Some of the ex-Lima models appear in the main Hornby products list. This range is known as Hornby International. This acquisition also included the Rivarossi line of HO-scale products, also originally from Italy, and the Arnold brand of N-scale products. They also took over the Spanish model railway company Electrotren. Electrotren had been the Spanish importer for Scalextric which was sold in Spain as "Superslot". The takeover was at the request of the Spanish company and was not due to obvious financial problems. They have remained independent outside of the Hornby International umbrella.

Hornby's competition includes Bachmann Industries and, to a lesser extent, niche companies such as the Danish model railway company Heljan, Dapol, Vi Trains and Peco. In response to this competition, from 2008, Hornby Railways produced a range of highly detailed British steam and diesel locomotives, such as the BR 9F, LNER Class A4, SR Merchant Navy, Class 60, Class 50, Class 31 and Class 08.

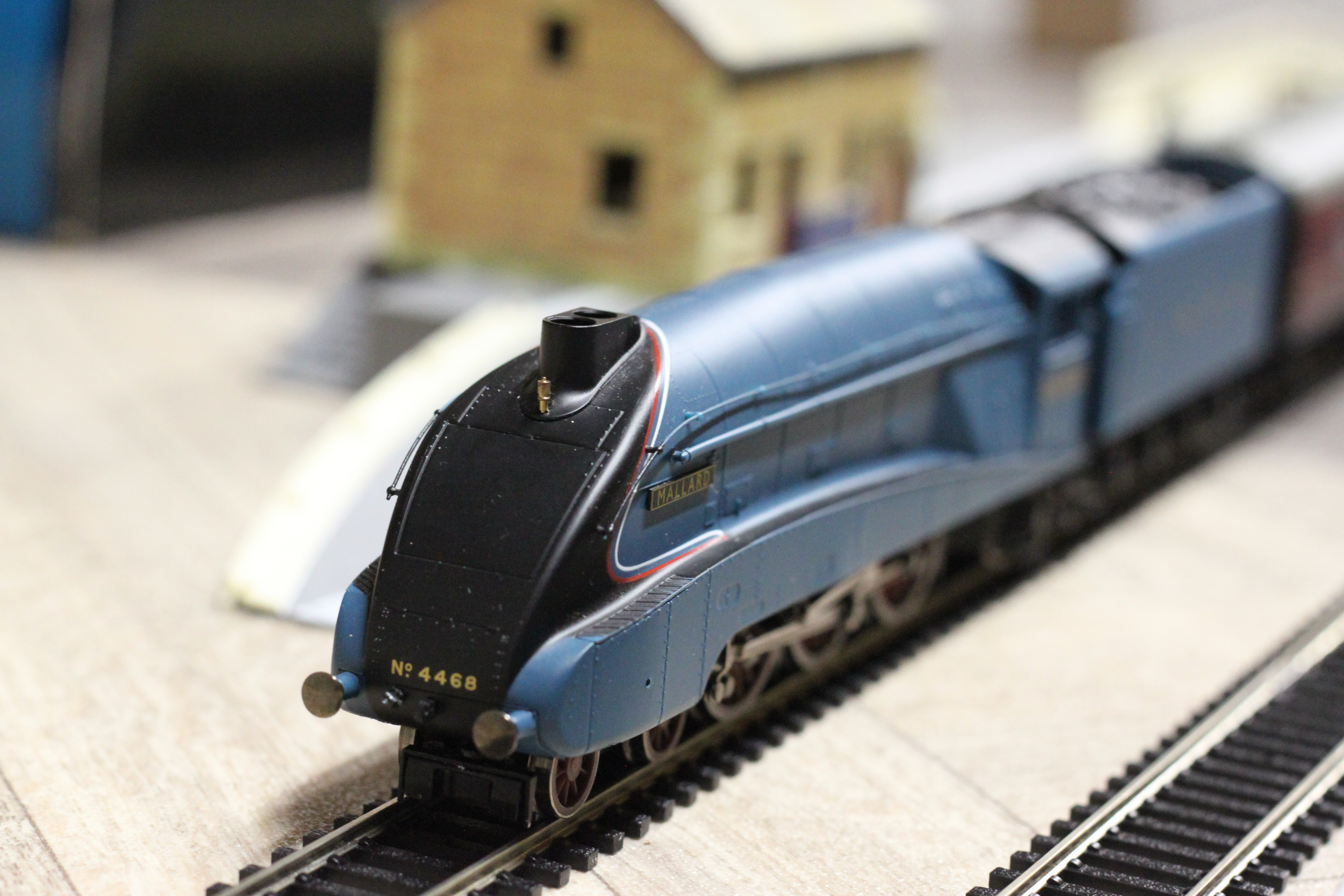
An A4 Pacific 4468 Mallard Hornby Railroad 00 gauge locomotive

In November 2006, Hornby Hobbies acquired Airfix and Humbrol paints for the sum of £2.6 million. The parent company, Humbrol, had gone into administration earlier that year after cashflow problems. Airfix fans had been concerned that it could be the end of the brand, but just as the name Hornby was once a tradename of Meccano, Airfix is now a successful tradename of Hornby.

In May 2008, Hornby announced the acquisition of Corgi, one of the world's oldest makers of collectable die-cast models of trucks, buses, cars and aeroplanes, from Corgi International for £7.5million.

In 2009, the Hornby Shop and Visitor Centre was in development. Christmas 2009 saw the launch of the new Hornby Shop at Margate in Kent, with the visitor centre still under construction. July 2010 saw the opening of the Hornby Shop And Visitor Centre.

=== Financial troubles, PAM takeover ===
From 2015, Hornby plc began to announce a series of declining financial results. The major reason behind the decline Hornby declared was twofold, with the decline in the number of collecting customers, (older customers dying and not being replaced by younger ones), and a general lack of interest in modelling as a hobby in light of the digitization and advancement of the internet games industry. After the PLC shares dropped by more than 50% in a year, at the 2016 results, Hornby declared that it planned to cut more than half of the toys it made, after discovering that it generated 90% of its profits from only 50% of its range. In the year to 31 March 2017, revenues fell further to £47.4m from £55.8m, while underlying losses widened to £6.3m from a £5.7m deficit in 2016.

The financial declines culminated in July 2017, when the largest shareholder Phoenix Asset Management (PAM) agreed to buy 17.6 million Hornby shares for 32.375p from the second largest – and activist/protagonist shareholder – New Pistoia Income (NPI), which gave PAM a 55.2% holding in the company. Under stock exchange rules, this triggered a mandatory takeover offer of Hornby by PAM, at the NPI strike price of 32.375p, valuing Hornby at £27.4million. As a result of the takeover, the chairman of Hornby resigned from the company in August 2017, followed by the Chief Executive in September 2017.

In October 2017, PAM announced their new management team who would join the company and steer through the turnaround. They were Lyndon Davies, former Mettoy employee and owner of Oxford Diecast, Simon Kohler, ex Hornby marketing manager, and Tim Mulhall, also from Oxford Diecast and former importer for Hornby International brands in the UK.

The end of year Annual Report for March 2018 revealed how serious the position was for the company, showing further slumps in revenue (down to £35.7m) and a widening pre-tax loss (up to £7.6m).

The March 2019 end of year report showed progress, having stabilised the business, closed unnecessary offices and returned to their historic home in Margate. Sales grew to £37.8m, losses narrowed to £2.8m

The COVID-19 pandemic in 2020 was one element credited in a sales growth of 30%, which was announced in the 2019/20 half year results which covered a period to March 2020. Half year sales of £21m (up from £15.9m) and the first profit in 8 years.

In August 2021, it was announced that Hornby had acquired the remaining 51% of LCD Enterprises (who owned Oxford Diecast) for £1.3 million. This followed Hornby's 49% stake in the company, for which they had acquired in 2017.

In October 2022 Hornby released a range of TT:120 items. Two train sets are being offered, with four series of locomotives and rolling stock available.

In November 2024, Hornby announced it had agreed to sell Oxford Diecast Ltd to EKD Enterprises Ltd, a business owned by former chairman and current non-executive director Lyndon Davies and his family for £1.38 million.

In April 2025, Hornby delisted from the Alternative Investment Market of the London Stock Exchange, citing regulatory hurdles, and later sold Scalextric to Purbeck Capital Partners for £30m.

== Collector and enthusiasts' groups ==
Pre-1964 Hornby trains have enjoyed a level of adult collector interest since the 1940s. In 1969 the Hornby Railway Collector's Association was founded to cater for this and currently enjoys a membership approaching 3000, producing 10 journals a year, as well as other literature.

Publications on older Hornby and Meccano products are dominated by those published by New Cavendish Books as "The Hornby Companion Series", in particular Chris & Julie Graebe's "The Hornby Gauge 0 System" and Michael Foster's sister volume on Hornby Dublo. Triang-Hornby and later Hornby products are catered for by the Train Collectors' Society.

== Brands ==
Hornby owns Humbrol and, through that acquisition, Airfix, and Corgi Toys. It also owns a number of established brands in the model railway market.

=== Lima ===
Lima was an Italian company that was a popular, affordable supplier of model railway material but market pressures in the mid-1990s led to Lima merging with Rivarossi, Arnold, and Jouef. When these consolidations failed and operations ceased in 2004, Hornby Railways acquired Lima's assets. As of mid 2006, a range of these products has been made available under the Hornby International brand, refitted with NEM couplings and sprung buffers and sockets for DCC decoders. Lima also had a popular OO gauge range much like Hornby, which strengthened the case for acquisition.

=== Skaledale ===
'Skaledale' is a range of resin buildings and track accessories produced for 00 gauge railways by Hornby Hobbies Ltd. Production began in 2003 when an initial range of only 6 items were distributed into the market place. The interest and demand proved so positive that the range increased the following year to include new domestic style buildings plus the introduction of station and trackside buildings.

Many of the models are similar to those of 'Lyddle End' (a range which followed 'Skaledale'), but these "N" Gauge buildings are produced to a smaller scale of 1:148.

The Skaledale range comprises station buildings, platforms, trackside accessories, shops, houses, churches, monuments and street furniture.

Forbes Outfitters and St. Andrews Church for example, provided the inspiration for their scaled down models, although others are adapted to suit a particular price point or subject. The station and trackside buildings are inspired by actual structures but again in some cases adapted to suit manufacturing constraints. Some of the station pieces were inspired by Goathland railway station.

=== Lyddle End ===
Lyddle End is the range of N scale model railway buildings for Hornby Railways. The buildings are created from high quality die cast resin and are made to represent the fictional village of Lyddle End, somewhere in England. Most of the buildings are models of GWR style buildings made out of red sandstone.

Hornby created these buildings thanks to the success of their 00 gauge buildings, which they call Skaledale. Many of the buildings are the same as their Skaledale equivalent, except in different scales, to save the cost of designing a new model. They are generally released about 6 months to a year behind their 00 counterparts. When Hornby announced their 2010 range, Lyddle End was not mentioned, presumably ended.

=== Warlord Games Limited ===
In July 2023 Hornby acquired a 25% share in Warlord Games, a company that produces historical tabletop wargames.

== In media ==
An attempt to build the world's longest model railway formed the final episode of James May's Toy Stories. May hoped that a train would run successfully along the length of the Tarka Trail, which is a disused 37-mile (60 km) long railway line in North Devon.

Hornby was heavily involved, providing the track and the prototype of their OO gauge British Rail Class 395 Javelin train. Simon Kohler, marketing manager of Hornby model railways, said that the train which travels at just 1 mile per hour (1.6 km/h) failed two miles short of Bideford station; but he also told BBC News "Even though the last locomotive gave up the ghost at Instow, we did link the track. In April 2011 on the TV series James May's Toy Stories: Revisited, James tried again, this time against the Germans. All the trains reached their destinations and the British team won.

In 2019, the mini-series James May's Big Trouble in Model Britain was broadcast on BBC Four, which the channel described as, 'A year inside Hornby Hobbies – an iconic British toymaker on the brink of collapse.'

In 2021, a ten-episode series was produced by Rare TV for the Yesterday TV channel called Hornby: A Model World, which went behind the scenes at Hornby and also featured models from Airfix, Scalextric and Corgi within various episodes. A second season of 11 episodes was broadcast in 2023.

== One:One Collection ==
In 2019 the One:One Collection of real historic engines and rolling stock opened at Hornby's former Margate factory. It had been purchased by Jeremy Hosking, with some Hosking-owned rolling stock placed on display.

== See also ==
- Hornby Virtual Railway
- Hornby Track Master
