= Bing =

Bing most often refers to:

- Bing Crosby (1903–1977), American singer
- Microsoft Bing, a web search engine

Bing may also refer to:

== Food and drink ==
- Bing (bread), a Chinese flatbread
- Bing (soft drink), a UK brand
- Bing cherry, a variety of cherry
- Twin Bing or Bing, a candy made by Palmer Candy Company

== Names ==
- Bing (German surname), a German-language surname
- Bing (Chinese surname) (邴), a Chinese surname

== Places ==
- Bing Prefecture, an ancient Chinese province
- Bing, Hormozgan, a village in Hormozgan Province, Iran
- Binag, Sistan and Baluchestan, a village in Sistan and Baluchestan Province, Iran
- Manor of Byng, Suffolk, England

== Television ==
- Bing (TV series), a British children's television series
- Bada Bing or the Bing, a fictional strip club in The Sopranos
- Bing or Evan Chambers, a character in Greek
- Bing, a character in The Angry Beavers

== Other uses ==
- Bing (company), a German company that manufactured toys and kitchen utensils
- Bing (dog), a British dog who served in World War II
- Bing (mining), a Scottish term for mining waste
- Bing & Bing, a former New York real estate development company
- Bing Concert Hall, a building on the Stanford University campus
- Barbershop in Germany or BinG, a German barbershop music organization

== People with the name ==
- Zhao Bing (1272–1279), last Emperor of the Song dynasty
- Bing Devine (1916–2007), American baseball executive
- Bing Futch (born 1966), American musician
- Bing Gordon, video game executive
- Bing Juckes (1926–1990), American ice hockey player
- Bing Judd, American politician
- Bing Miller (1894–1966), American baseball outfielder and coach
- Bing Russell (1926–2013), American actor
- Bing Slamet or Ahmad Syech Albar (1927–1974), Indonesian singer, songwriter, comedian and actor
- Bing West (born 1940), American military writer and government official

== See also ==
- Bing, Bing, Bing!, a 1995 album by Charlie Hunter
- Bingbing (disambiguation)
- Binge (disambiguation)
- Bing Gordyn, a character in Little Britain USA
- Byng (disambiguation)
