= Bing (German surname) =

Bing is a surname of German and Scottish origin. Notable people with the surname include:

- Abraham Bing (1752–1841), German rabbi
- Andrew Bing (1574–1652), English scholar
- Anine Bing, Danish model
- Bernice Bing (1936–1998), Chinese-American artist
- Brandon Bing (born 1989), American football cornerback
- Darnell Bing (born 1984), American football player
- Dave Bing (born 1943), American basketball player and mayor
- Elisabeth Bing (1914–2015), German physical therapist
- Fritz Bing (1934–2023), South African cricketer, businessman and cricket administrator
- Geoffrey Bing (1909–1977), British politician
- Herman Bing (1889–1947), German-American actor and voice actor
- Ignaz Bing (1840–1918), German industrialist, naturalist, poet, and memoirist
- Ilse Bing (1899–1998), German photographer
- Inigo Bing (born 1944), British judge
- Isaiah Beer Bing (1759–1805), French writer and translator
- Jon Bing (1944–2014), Norwegian law professor
- Jonathan Bing, American attorney and politician
- Kristian Magdalon Bing (1862–1935), Norwegian jurist, author and mountaineer
- Lee Bing (died 2012), Hong Kong mezzo-soprano
- Paul Robert Bing (1878–1956), Swiss-German neurologist
- R. H. Bing (1914–1986), American mathematician
- Richard Bing (1909–2010), American cardiologist
- Rudolf Bing (1902–1997), Austrian-born opera impresario
- Siegfried Bing (1838–1905), German art dealer
- Stanley Bing, pen name of Gil Schwartz (1951–2020), American humorist and novelist
- Steve Bing (1965–2020), American businessman
- Suzanne Bing (1885–1967), French actress

== Fictional characters ==
- Chandler Bing, a character from Friends

== See also ==
- Bing (disambiguation)
- Byng (disambiguation)
