= Ignaz Bing =

- Born: January 29, 1840; Memmelsdor
- Died: March 24, 1918; Nuremberg
- Occupations: Industrialist, Naturalist, Poet, Memoirist
- Known for: Co-founder of GBN (Gebrüder Bing Nürnberg)

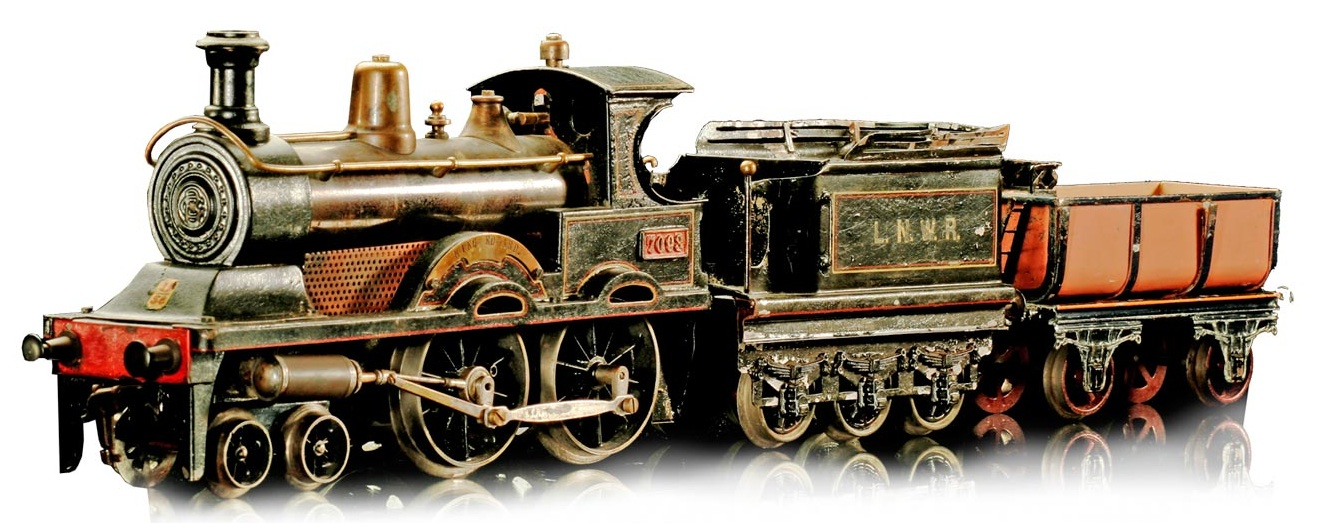
King Edward live steam locomotive

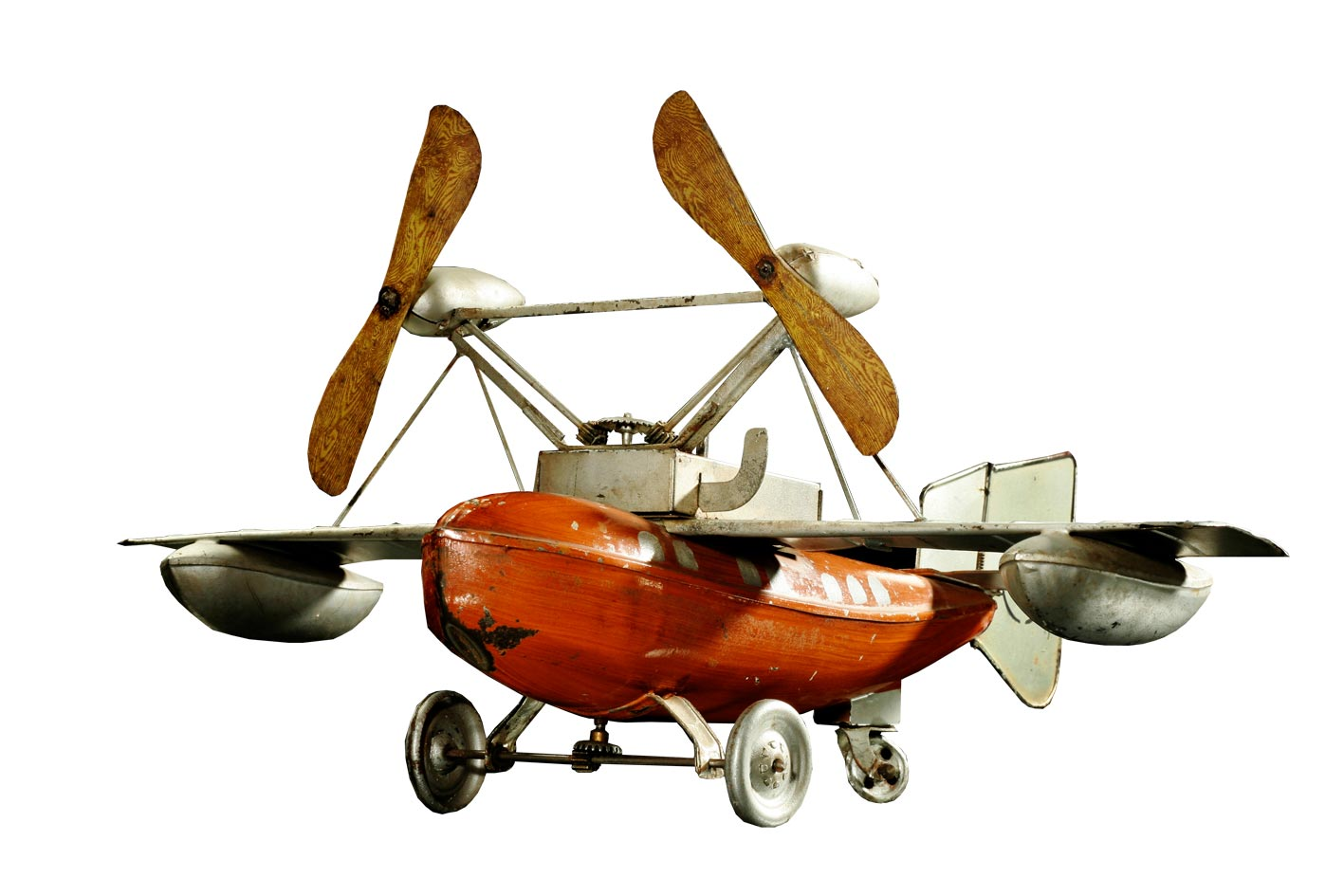
Flying boat

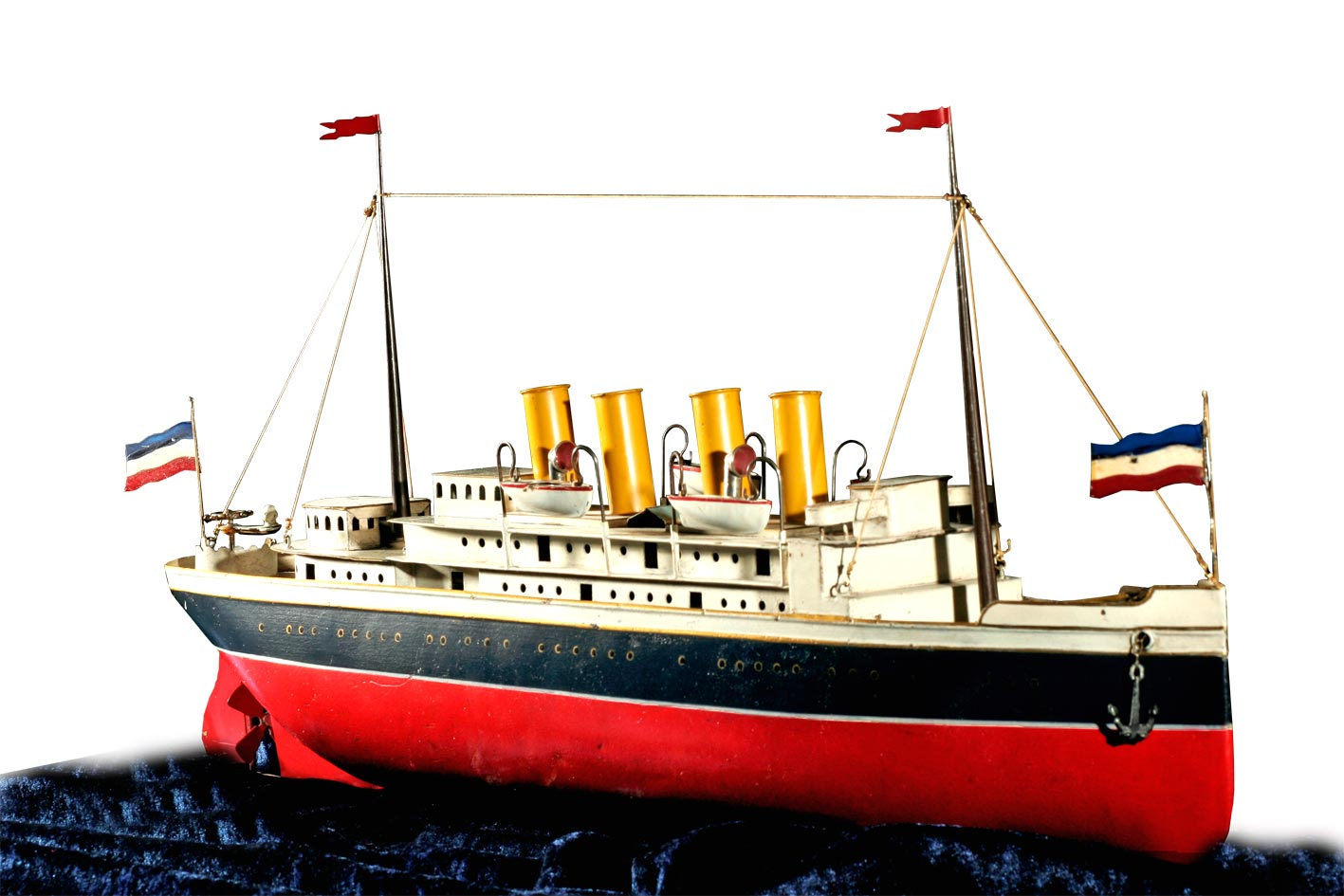
Toy ocean liner

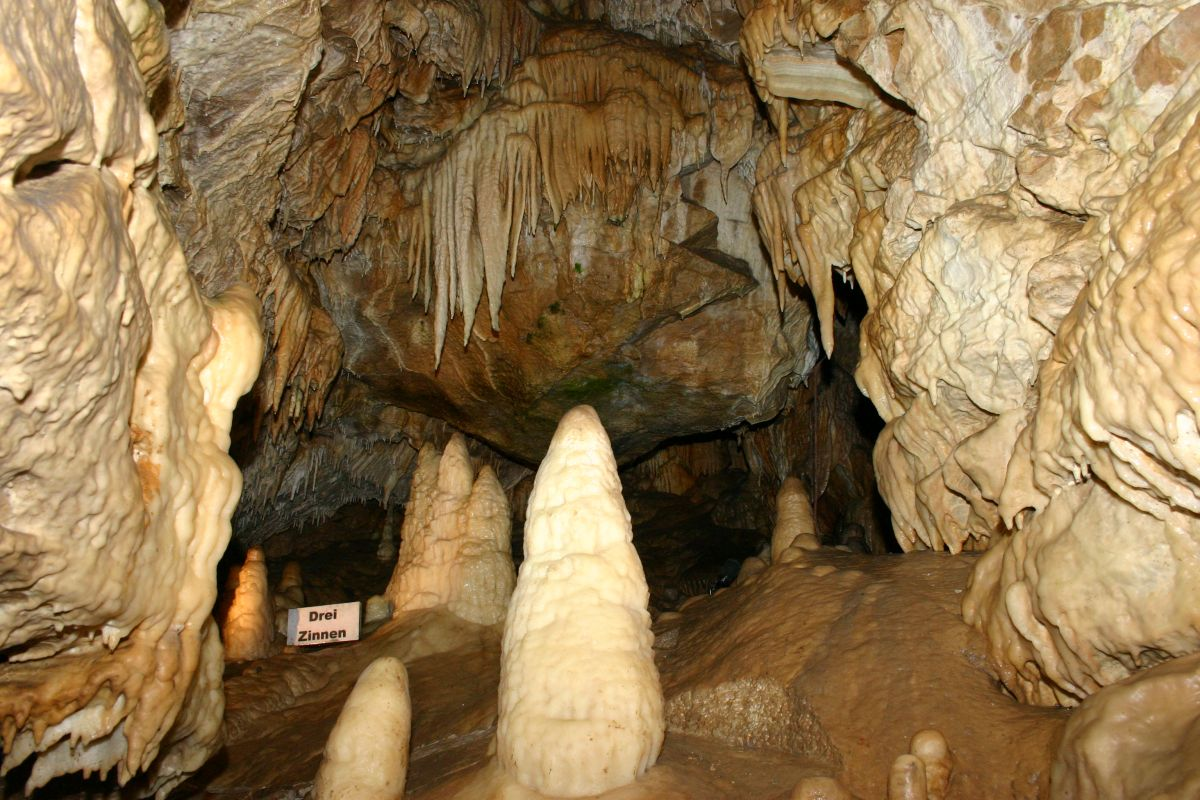
Cave formations in the Binghöhle

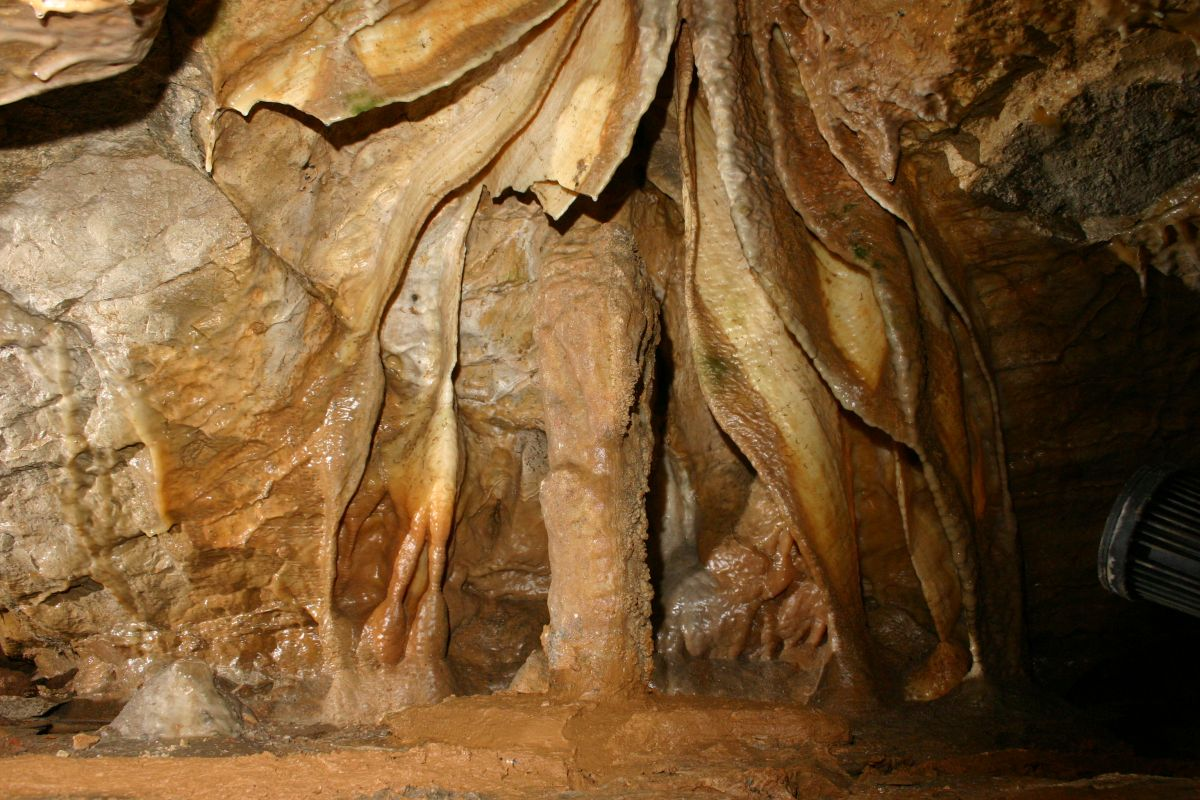
Drip formations in the Binghöhle

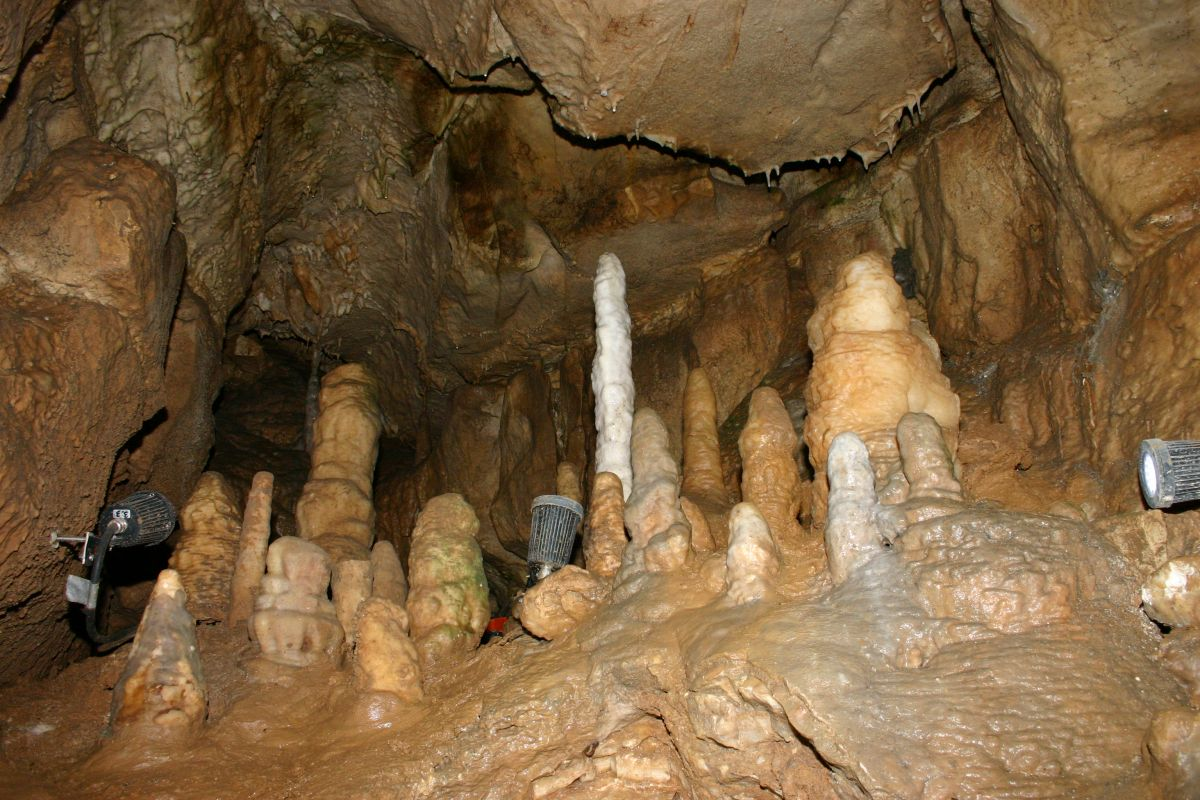
Stalagmites in the Binghöhle

Ignaz Bing (January 29, 1840 - March 24, 1918) was a German-Jewish industrialist, naturalist, poet, and memoirist.

== Life and career ==
The brothers Ignaz Bing and Adolf Bing were the children of Bela Levi (later Babette Tuchmann) and Saloman Beer Bernard Bing, an Ashkenazi Jewish master dyer in Memmelsdorf, Germany, who went on to become a hops-dealer. In 1863 they founded GBN (Gebruder Bing Nurnberger Metall und Lakierwaren Fabrik) in Nuremberg, also known as BW (Bing Werke).

Ignaz was the leader of the two brothers. He began with a line of willow baskets and enamel household goods, then hired artisans to design and craft fine Art Nouveau pewter, copper, and glass tableware. Toy production commenced in 1880 and the company's first teddy bears were released in 1907. By the early 20th century, GBN was the largest toy company in the world, and the Bing factory in Nuremberg was the largest toy factory in the world, producing a variety of goods such as dollhouse furniture and enamelware, tin-litho metal toys, and an extensive catalogue of stationary model steam engines and model trains. Non-toy products manufactured by the company included gramophones, a line of recordings called Bingola Records, bicycles, kitchenware, office equipment, and electrical goods.

The Bing Brothers company employed thousands of workers and engaged in joint business investments with many collateral family members in Nuremberg and the wider environs of Bavaria. Bing goods were sold not only in Germany, but also in Great Britain, the United States of America, and Canada. As a prominent Nuremberg industrialist, Ignaz Bing helped to develop the modern concept of annual industry-wide trade shows. For his many services on behalf of his country's economy, he was honoured with the title of Privy Councillor of Commerce (Geheime Kommerzienrat) to the Bavarian Court.

Bing wrote poetry and memoirs, loved nature, and liked to explore caves. He discovered a beautiful stalactite cave in 1905 near the town of Streitberg (Wiesenttal). Using his own wealth, he paid for the lighting and development of the cavern gallery as a show cave so that others could tour it; he also personally conducted a tour of the cave for Prince Ludwig of Bavaria. Named after its discoverer, the cavern was called the Binghöhle (Bing Cave) from 1905 until the Nazis took over Germany. Then, because Bing was a Jew, they took control of it from the family, nationalized it, and renamed it the "Streitberger Cave" after the nearest town. However, in 1945, when the Nazi regime ended, it was renamed the Binghöhle and a settlement was given to the family in recompense for the earlier seizure. The site, now operated by the local municipality, was renovated in 2005 as a show cave and offers beautiful guided walking tours underground featuring lighting technology, including fairytale and birthday tours for children's parties.

Bing wrote three autobiographical memoirs, "Tales From A Merchant's Life" (1915), "My Family and Friends" (1916), and "My Travels" (1917). These were collected into one volume, translated into English, and published in 2013 under the title "Tales From My Life." These memoirs contain quite a bit of genealogical and sociological information along the way, and Bing's anecdotes have been used as primary research to augment the Geni.com profiles of a number of his family members and to provide historical background to those who study Jewish culture in pre-Nazi Germany.

Ignaz Bing died at the age of 78 in Nuremberg. His son, Stephan Bing, took on the role of leadership. Sales declined, however, as antisemitism became a force in Germany under the leadership of Adolf Hitler.

in 1933, Bing's grandson, the economist Dr. Rudolf Benario, was among the first three Jews murdered in a Nazi concentration camp, at Dachau. That same year the Bing Works company was liquidated. Stephan Bing fled to England, where he helped to start the British toy company Trix.

== See also ==
- Bing (disambiguation)
- Manufacturing companies of Germany
- Toy train manufacturers
- Toy steam engine manufacturers
- List of show caves in Germany
