= Bingbing =

Bingbing or Bing-Bing or variant, may refer to:

- "Bing Bing", a song from The ReVe Festival: Day 1 EP by Red Velvet
- Bing & Bing, apartment real estate developers in New York City

== See also ==
- Pingping (disambiguation)
- Bing (disambiguation)
