= Historic Toy Museum, Freinsheim =

Museum in Freinsheim, Germany

Coordinates: 49°30′19.67″N 8°12′45.3290″E

- Established: 2011
- Location: Freinsheim, Germany
- Type: Toy museum

Historic Toy Museum, Freinsheim, Rhineland-Palatinate

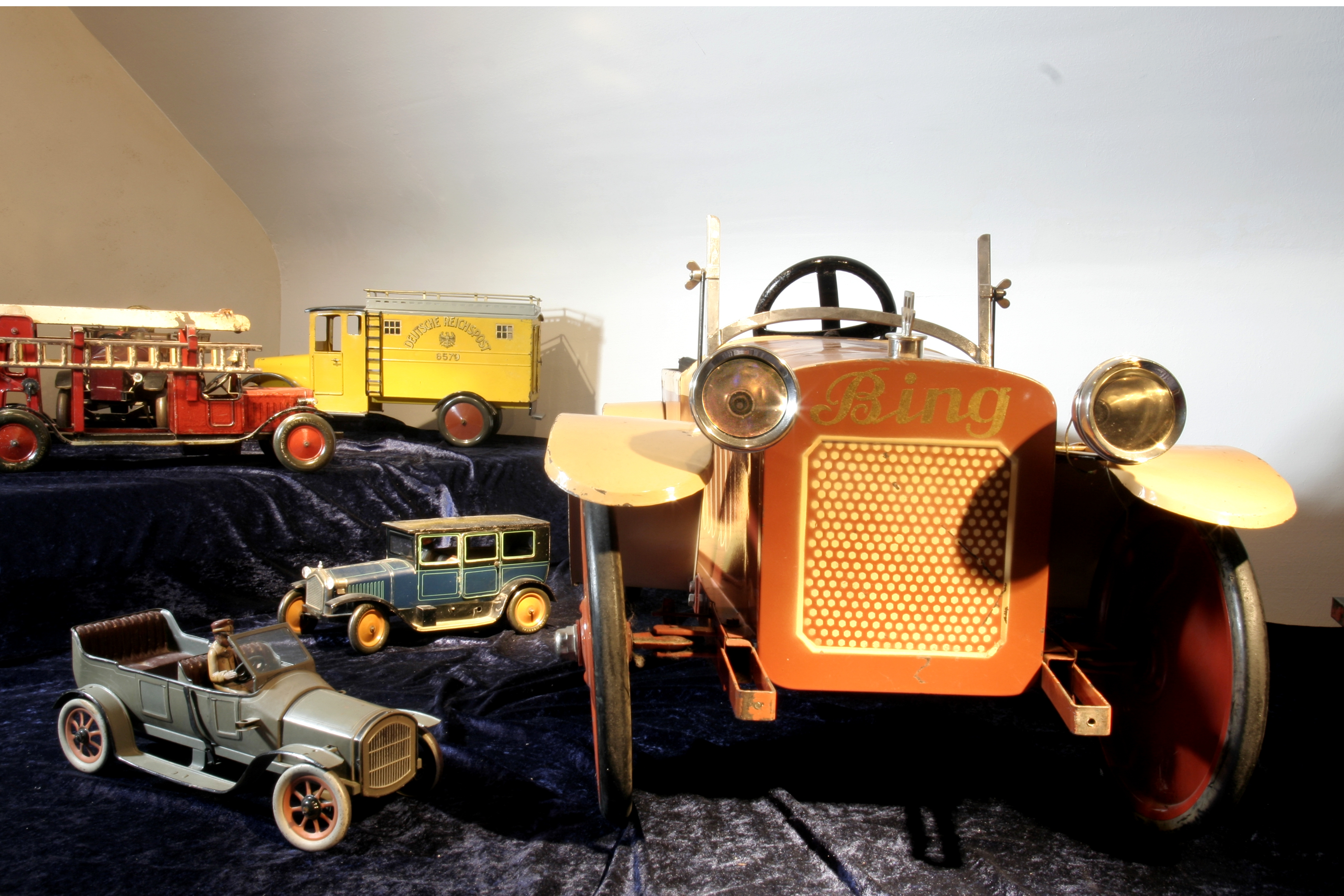
Bing pedal car

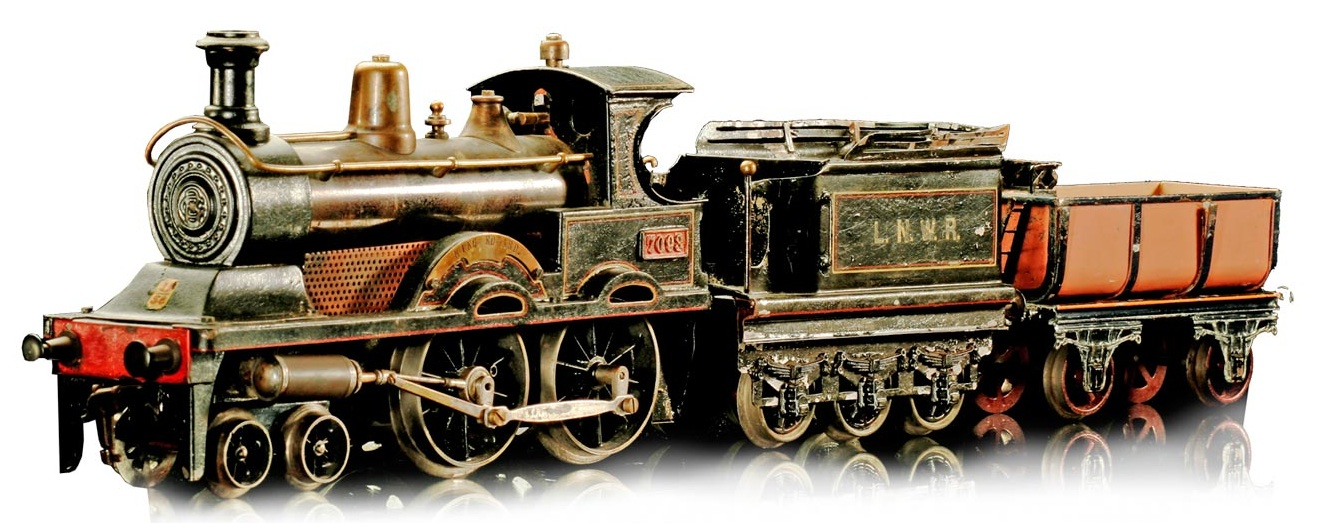
Bing 'King Edward' gauge II real steam

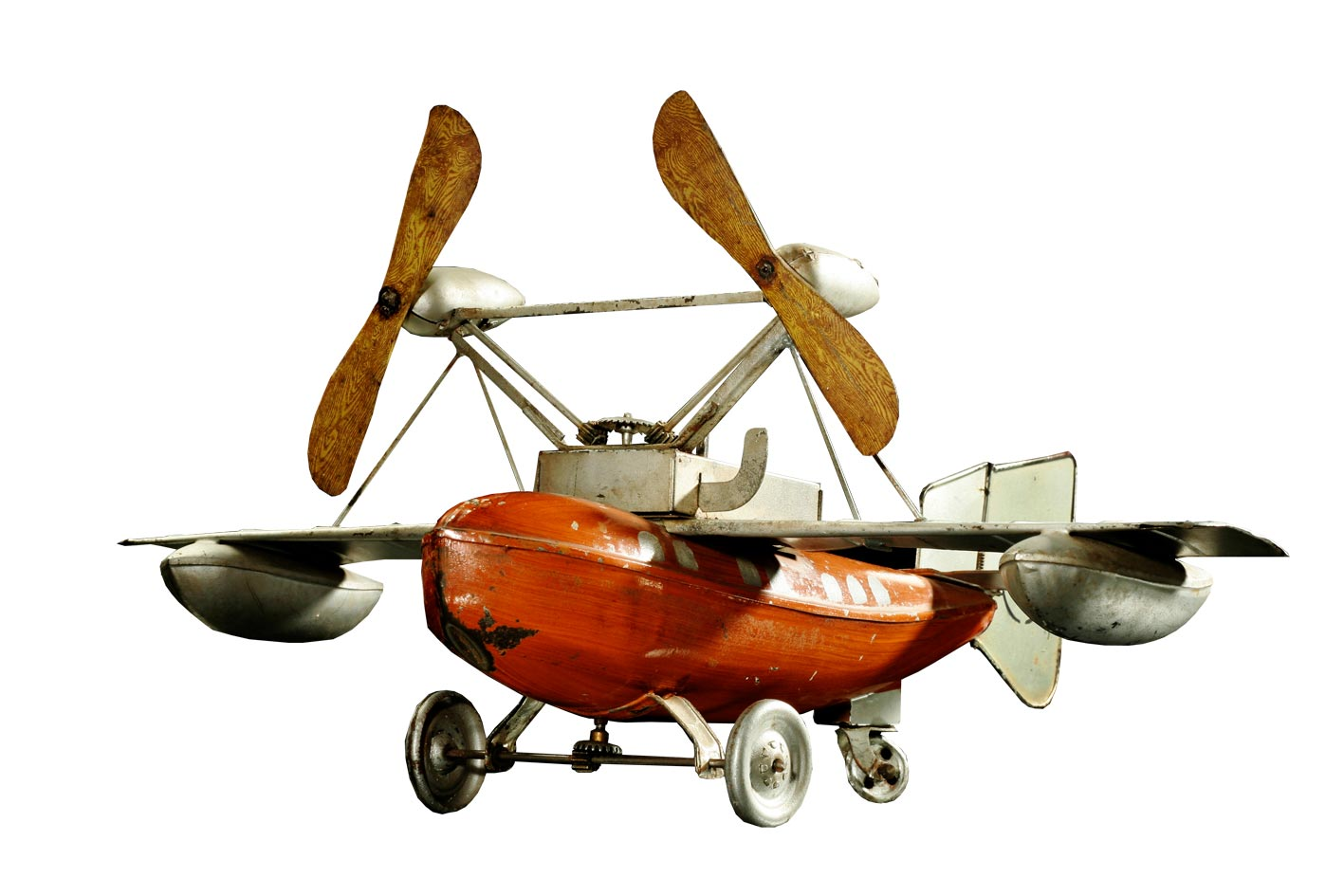
Bing flying boat

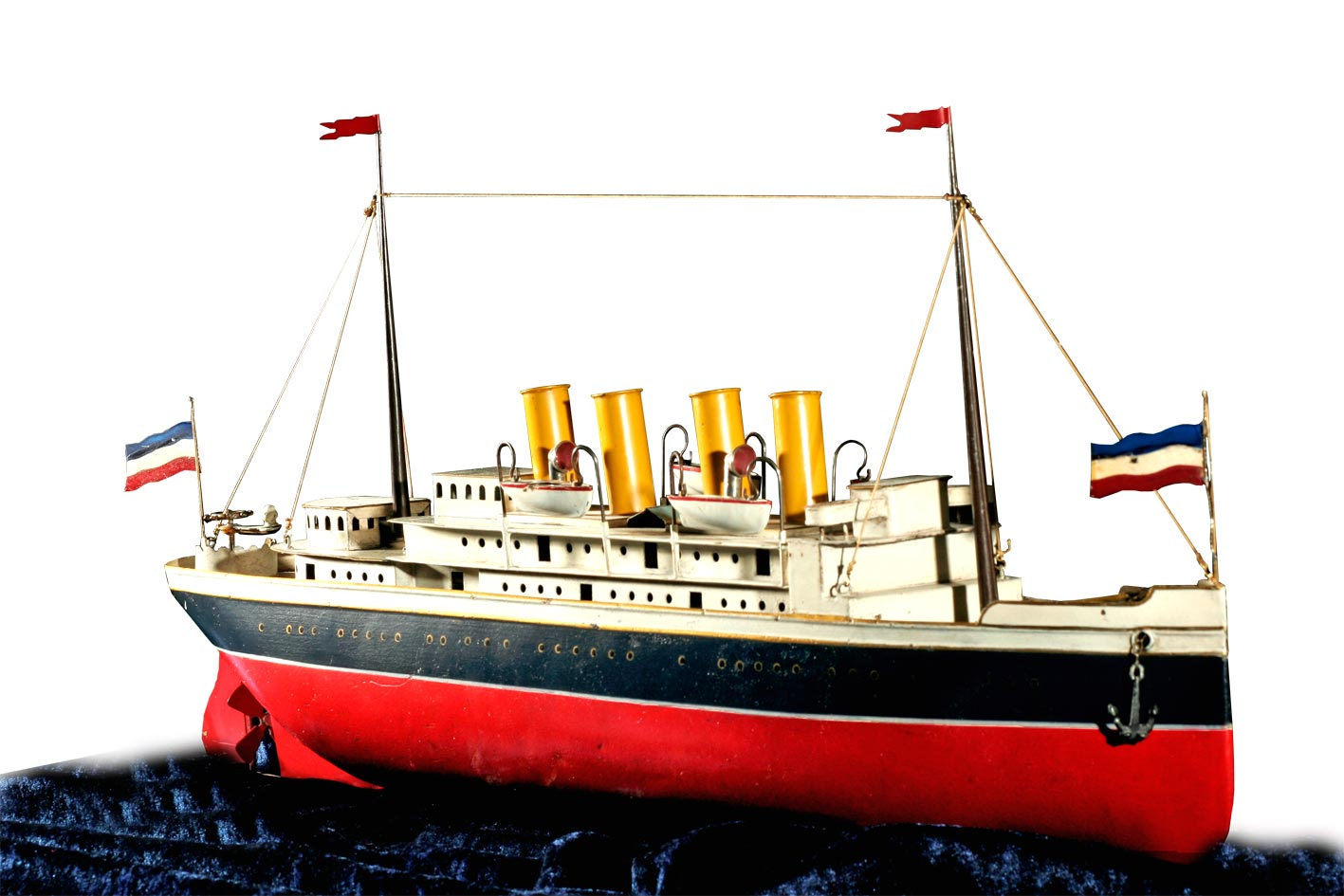
Bing ocean liner

The Historic Toy Museum in Freinsheim (Historisches Spielzeugmuseum Freinsheim) in Germany is a private collection of old toys.

== Exhibition ==
The exhibits date from the time of the Industrial Revolution around 1890 to the Second World War. Most of them are products by the firm of Bing in Nuremberg (Bing Werke Nürnberg). The museum curator is Marion Groll. The collection by Uwe Groll was the basis for the private museum opened on 2 April 2011. This collection originally concentrated on model railways and accessories of 0 Gauge from the House of Bing. Over the course of years Groll became so fascinated by the firm’s history and the variety of their products, that the collection grew ever wider.

=== Themes ===
The collection comprises about 1,000 exhibits covering various lines from Bing’s range of products. They were made before 1932 and are mostly in their original condition:

- Model railways (steam, clockwork, electric) and railway stations
- Steam engines, motorised models
- Cars, boats, planes
- Bears, dolls, soft toys
- Doll's kitchens, doll's houses and their accessories
- Board games and party games, playing cards
- Cinematographs, children's gramophones, Bingola
- Children’s books, brochures, catalogues, advertising material
- Physical and technical educational products
- Typewriters, cameras, irons
- Household items (enamel, copper, Jugendstil)
- Refrigerators, ovens
- Model soldiers, table lamps

== Haus an der Bach ==
The museum building, the "House by the Stream" (Haus an der Bach) originally went back to the Middle Ages and was renovated as a listed building. It lies opposite the Four-Pipe Well (Vier-Röhren-Brunnen) a former Eichbrunnen for the barrels of the vintner. The house has 3 storeys and a usable area of 300m² for exhibitions and the museum café.
