= Pingping =

Pingping (or Ping-Ping) may refer to:

- Pingping (payment), an electronic micropayment system in Belgium
- Ping Ping (singer), Surinamese singer
- He Pingping, recognised as the smallest adult in the world capable of walking
- Jose Tejada (born 1958), Filipino politician
- The original name of Bei Bei, a giant panda
- Ping Ping and Fu Shuang, two giant pandas

== See also ==
- Bingbing (disambiguation)
- Ping (disambiguation)
