= Bing (company) =

German toy manufacturer

- Company logo (1924–1933)
- Type: Private
- Industry: Toys and metal goods
- Founded: 1863
- Founder: Ignaz and Adolf Bing
- Defunct: 1933
- Headquarters: Nuremberg, Germany
- Area served: Germany; UK; US; Canada
- Products: Toys (especially toy trains and toy steam engines); Kitchenware; Office equipment Electrical goods Typewriters (models: Bing and Orga Privat)

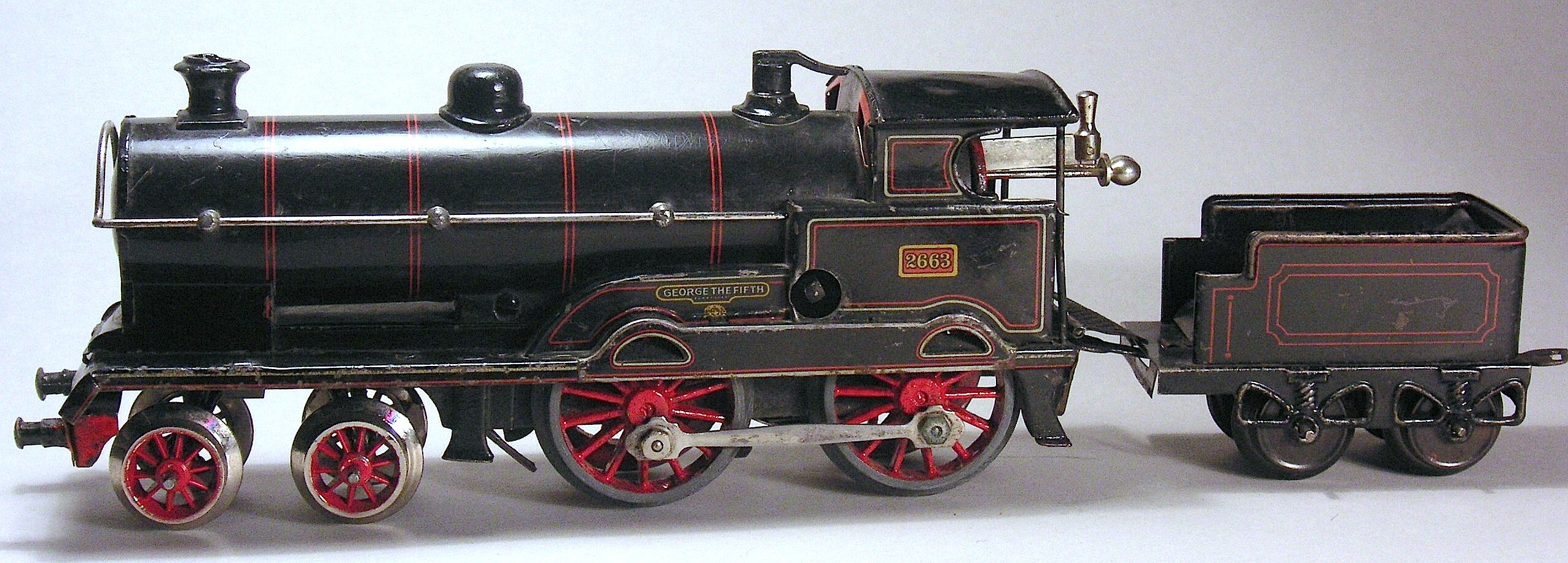
Clockwork-driven locomotive George the Fifth, ca. 1922. Tender not original

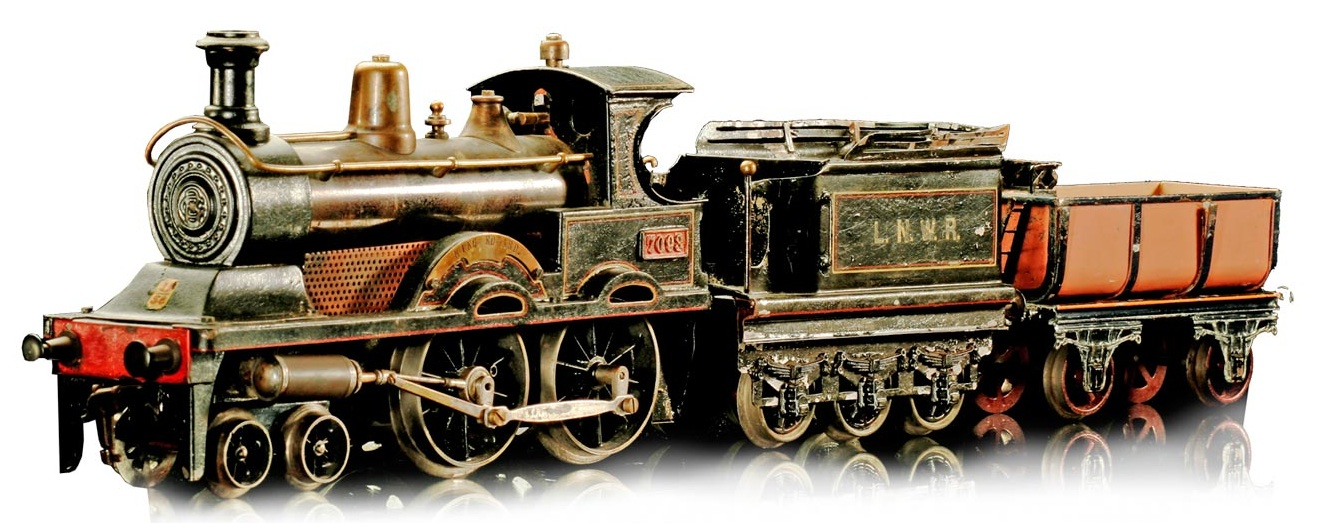
King Edward live steam locomotive

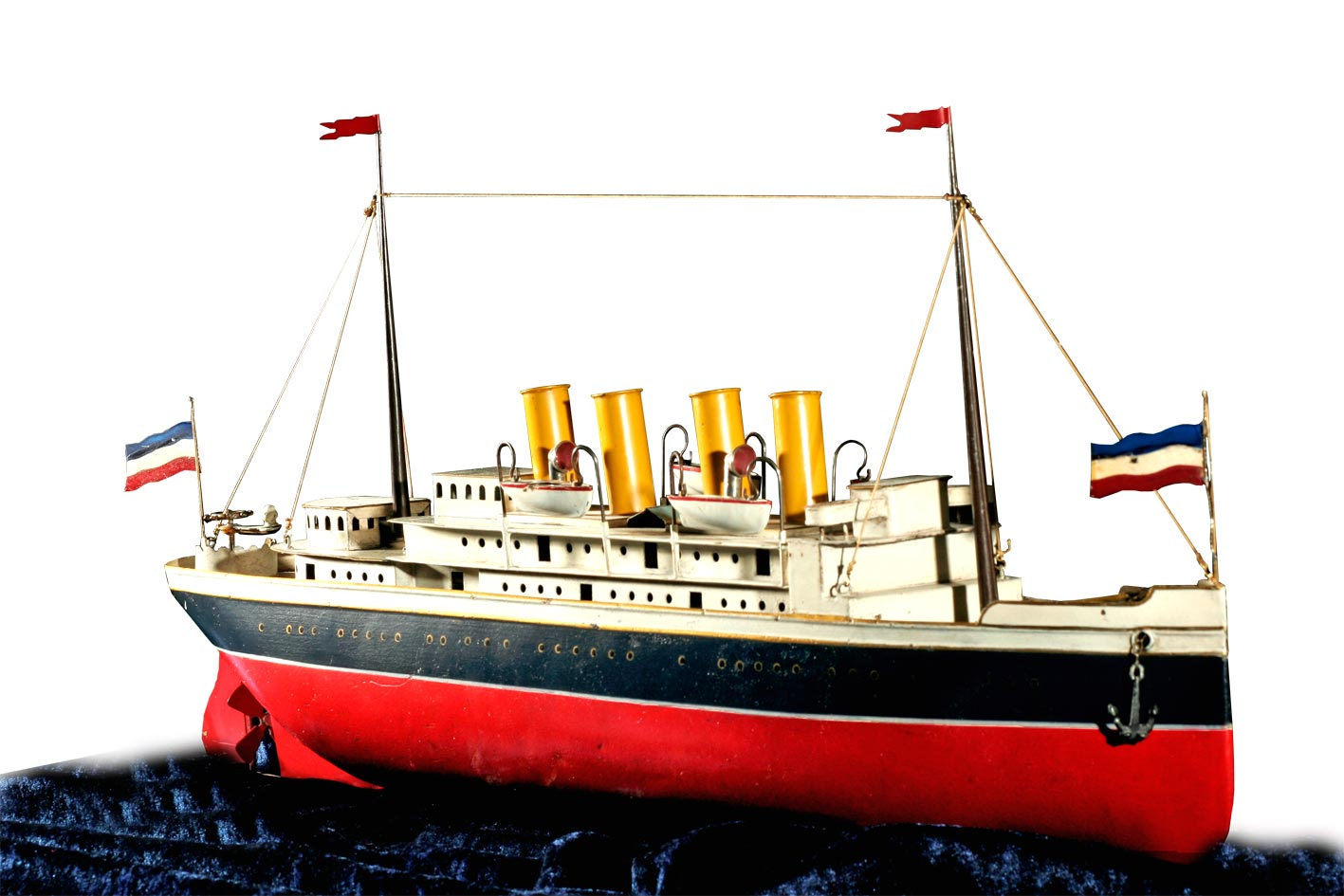
Ocean liner

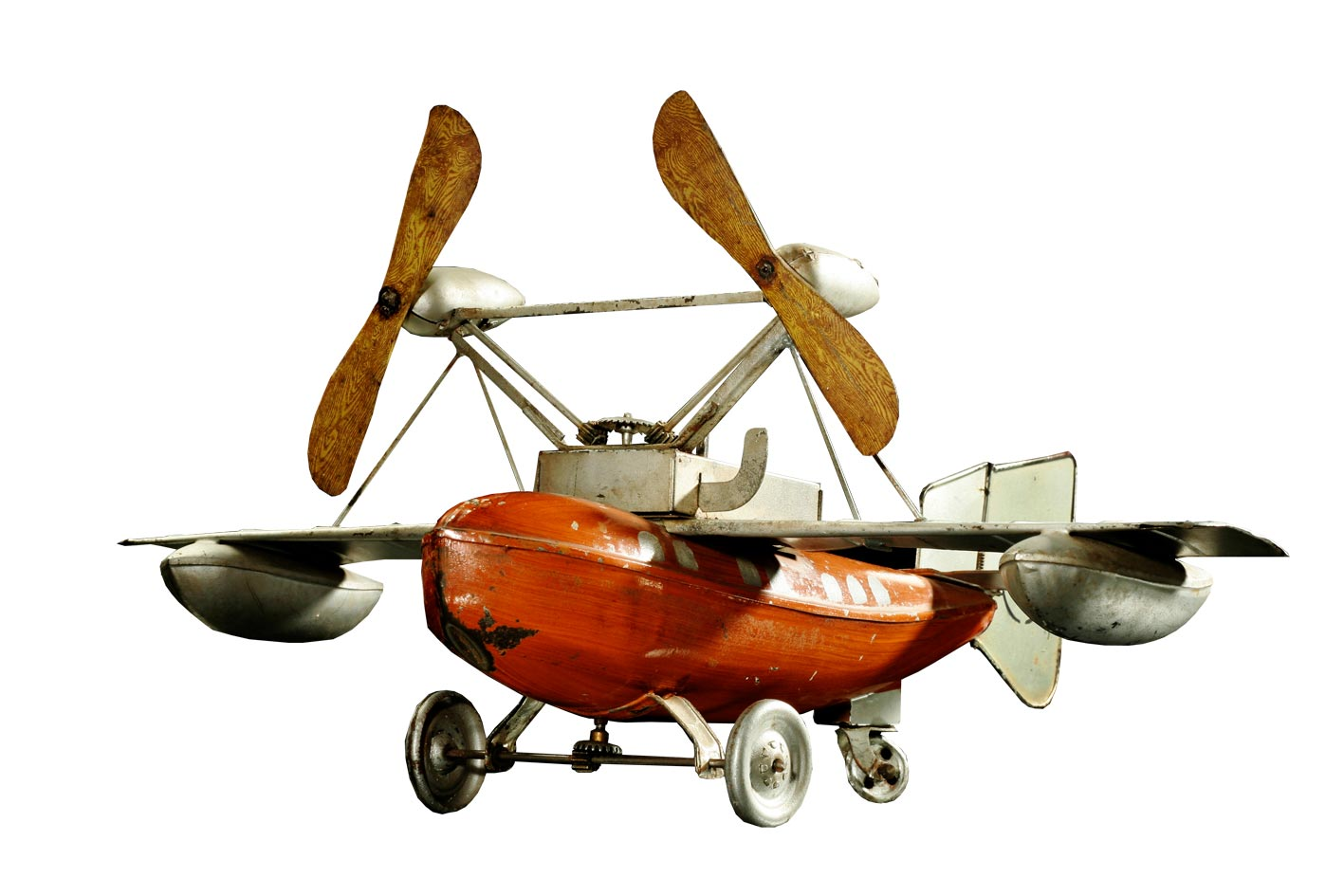
Flying boat

Bing or Gebrüder Bing ("Bing brothers") was a German toy company founded in 1863 in Nuremberg, Kingdom of Bavaria by two brothers, Ignaz Bing and Adolf Bing, initially producing metal kitchen utensils, but best remembered for its extensive lines of model trains and live steam engines.

== History ==
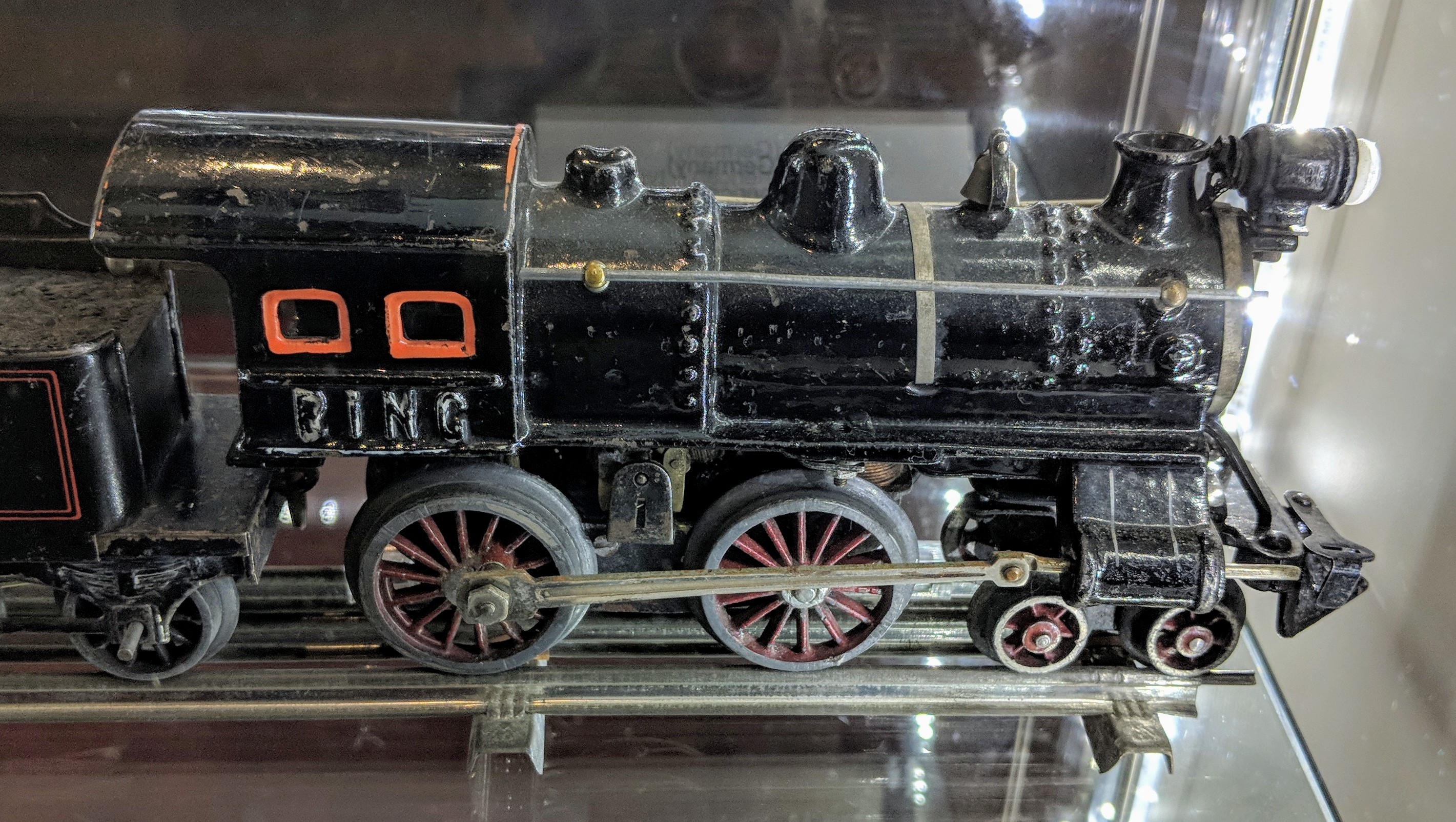
Bing electric American-type locomotive, circa 1914

The company produced fine pewter and copper tableware before embarking on toy production in 1880; their first teddy bears were released in 1907. By the early 20th century, Bing was the largest toy company in the world, and Bing's factory in Nuremberg was the largest toy factory in the world. Although Bing produced numerous toys, it is best remembered today for toy trains and live steam powered toys. In addition to toys, it made scientific and educational novelties and a vast range of kitchenware, tableware, office equipment, record players, electrical goods, etc.

The "Nuremberg Style" of manufacturing toys on steel sheets with lithographed designs that were stamped out of the metal, formed, and assembled using tabs and slots, was perfected by Bing. This manufacturing method was widespread in the 1950s, long after the Bing company had been dissolved.

=== Toy Trains ===
Bing's first trains hit the market in the 1880s. When Märklin formalized several standards for track gauges in 1891, Bing adopted them and added O gauge by 1895 and gauge III (2.5 inches), causing confusion as Marklin Gauge III became Bing gauge IV (3 inches).

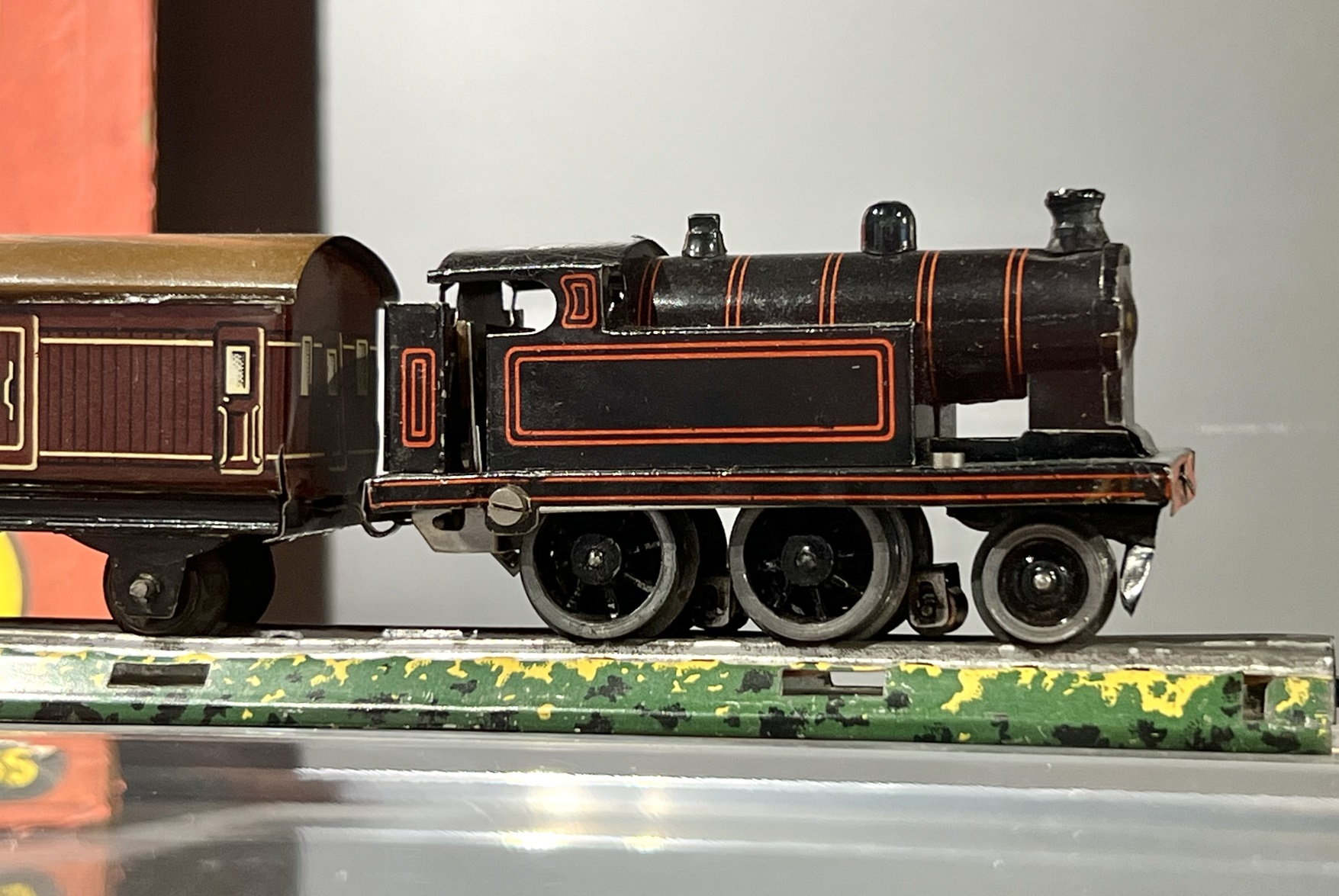
Electric steam locomotive in half the size of 0 gauge, 2024

In the 1922, under the auspices of Bassett-Lowke, Bing introduced a still-smaller gauge, half that of O gauge at 16.0 mm (0.625 in), called Bing Table Railway. The Bing Table Railway was the basis of the later OO gauge at 4 mm scale (1:72 scale) in the United Kingdom and HO gauge at 3.5 mm scale (1:87 scale) in North America and on the Continental Europe but with a gauge of 16.5 mm (0.65 in).

Bing produced numerous items for export, which were then sold either under its name or to other companies. Bing made trains styled for the British market for Bassett-Lowke and A. W. Gamage, and it produced trains for the North American market, which it exported and marketed on its own. Early in the 20th century, Bing jockeyed for market share with the Ives Manufacturing Company, who did not surpass Bing in sales for good until 1910. Throughout their histories, the two companies frequently copied one another's designs. Sometimes, the two companies use the same catalog number on their competing products. Due to cheap German labor and low shipping and duty costs, Bing often undercut the prices of its U.S. competitors. By 1914, Bing had 5,000 employees. By comparison, Märklin employed 600.

=== Live Steam engines ===
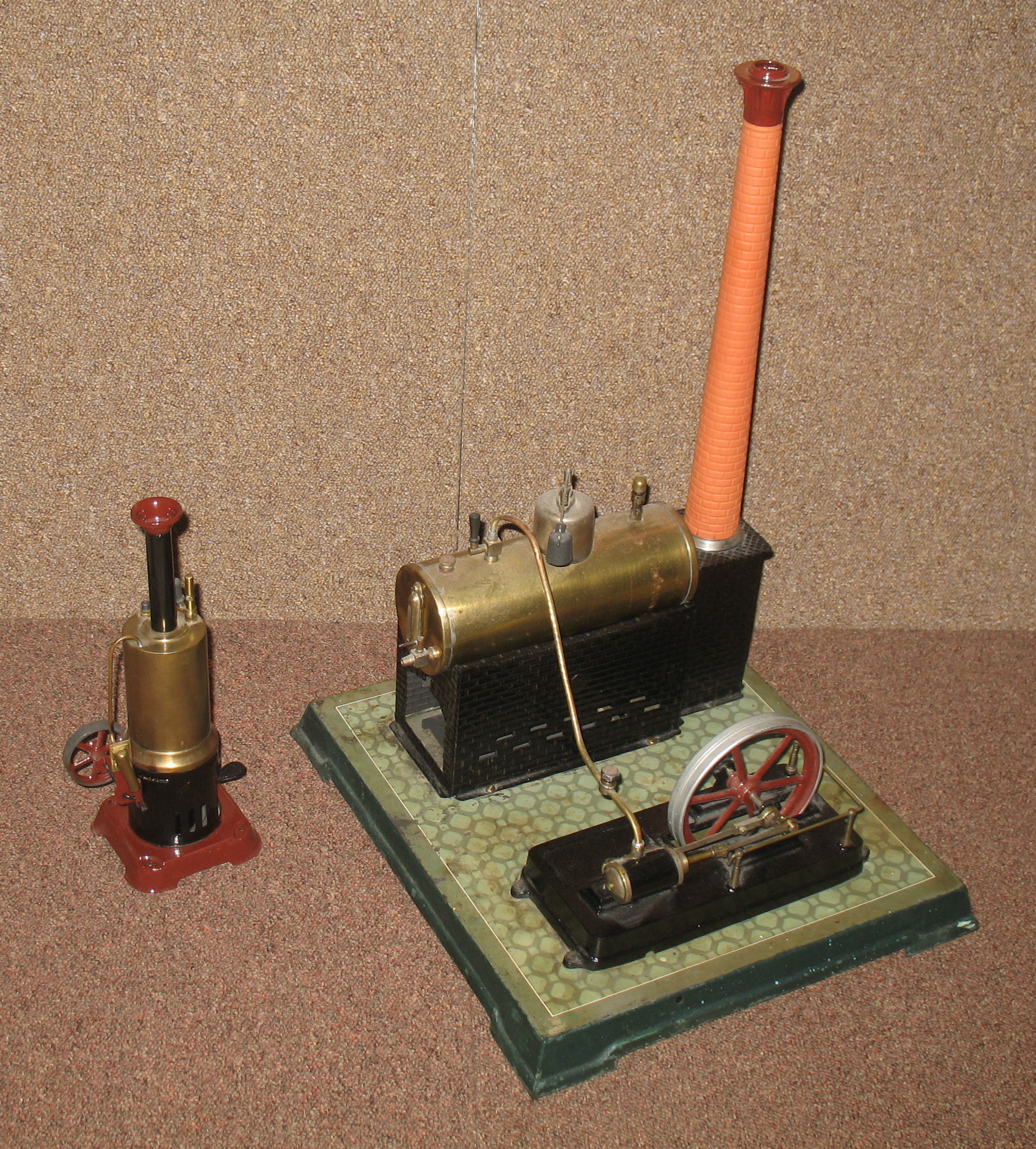
Two Bing stationary steam engines from c1915

The range of live steam engines included stationary engines, railway locomotives, road vehicles, and boats. Steam engines were made throughout most of the company's history. From the start, they made stationary engines and mobile models. The stationary models were generic in outline and not representative of particular prototypes. Mobile engines were more recognisable, and the more expensive versions could almost be classed as scale models, albeit inaccurate. The Railway locomotive versions were often very similar in outline to their clockwork and electric models.

== World War I and its aftermath ==
World War I forced Bing out of the export market while the company was at its peak. In 1916, Ives and the A. C. Gilbert Company formed the Toy Manufacturers Association and lobbied to protect the growing U.S. toy manufacturing industry, which had grown without foreign competition. As a result, tariffs on German toys rose from 35 percent to 70 percent. Additionally, the death of the company's founder, Ignaz Bing, in 1918 created a void in leadership.

German wages rose after the war, as did shipping costs and inflation. This created an unfavorable climate for German exports. Meanwhile, the Lionel Corporation produced advertising that criticized the manufacturing methods of its competitors' trains. Although targeted mainly at Ives, this ad campaign also hurt Bing's image because Bing's methods were similar. Bing struggled to sell through its old inventory and misjudged demand. When the market evaporated for its 1 gauge trains, it re-gauged some models to O gauge, where they looked oversized, and re-gauged other models to Lionel's Standard gauge, where they looked undersized.

Despite these setbacks, by 1921, Bing had re-established itself in the U.S. market, mainly via sales through the catalog retailer Sears, Roebuck & Co. However, by 1925, Lionel was also selling through Sears, and Bing quickly found itself squeezed out of the market. Bing attempted to compensate by increasing its presence in Canada, where it competed with mixed success with American Flyer.

== Interwar decline ==
By 1927, Bing was in severe financial trouble, and the company's president, Stephan Bing, and his son left the company, initially going to work with another Nuremberg-based toy firm.

In 1932, Bing was in liquidation, and the Bings, who were Jewish, fled to England because of the rise of Adolf Hitler. The company went out of business for good in 1933. Much of its tooling was acquired by Bub, a rival toy company.

Stephan Bing helped to start the British company Trix. Other Bing executives started the similarly named company Trix Express.

== Identifying Bing Products ==
Bing toys, kitchenware, and other products can be identified and dated by variations in the company trademark.

- 1882 - 1902 Statue holding a shield with the letters "GBN" (for "Gebrüder Bing Nürnberg" — "Brothers Bing Nuremberg")
- 1902 (short-lived version) Circle with the letters "GBN"
- 1902 - 1907 Diamond with the letters "GBN"
- 1908 - 1925 Diamond with the letters "GBN" and "Bavaria" below
- 1925 - 1934 Stylised letters B over W (for "Bing Werke" — "Bing Works")

== Museum ==
There is a private collection of Bing products in the Historic Toy Museum at Freinsheim in Rhineland-Palatinate.

== Gallery ==
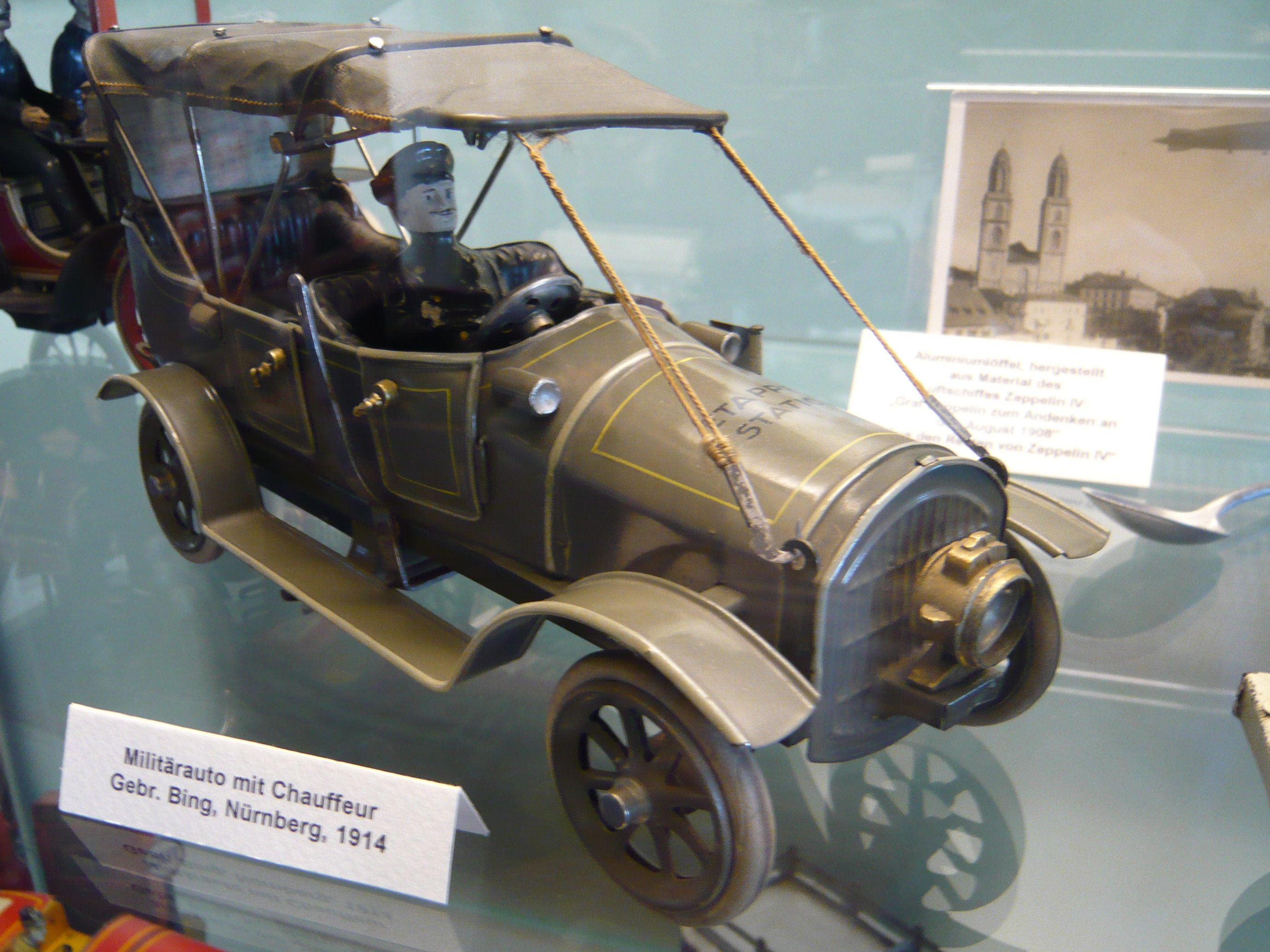
Military car, 1914

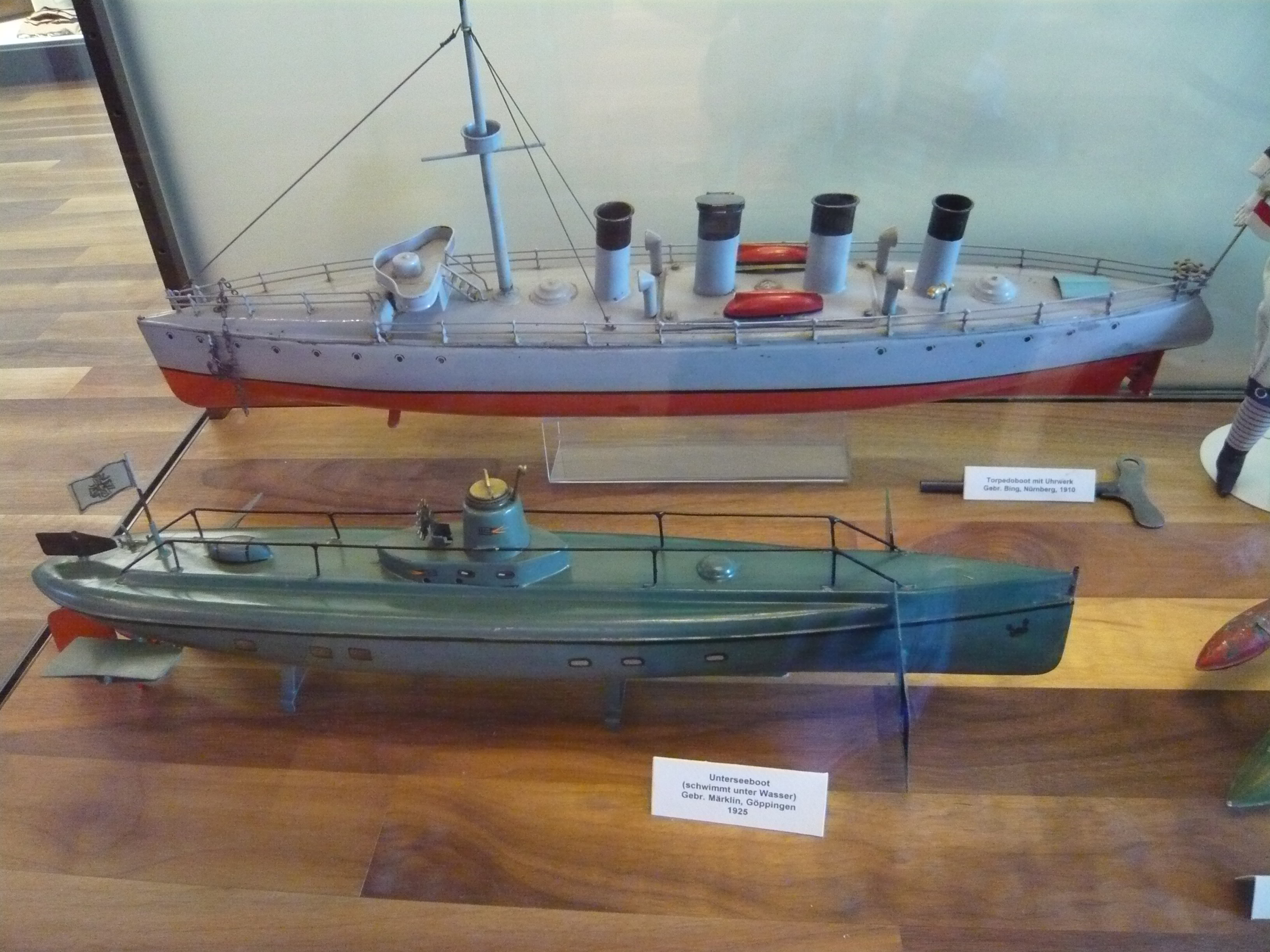
Clockwork-driven torpedo boat (top), 1910

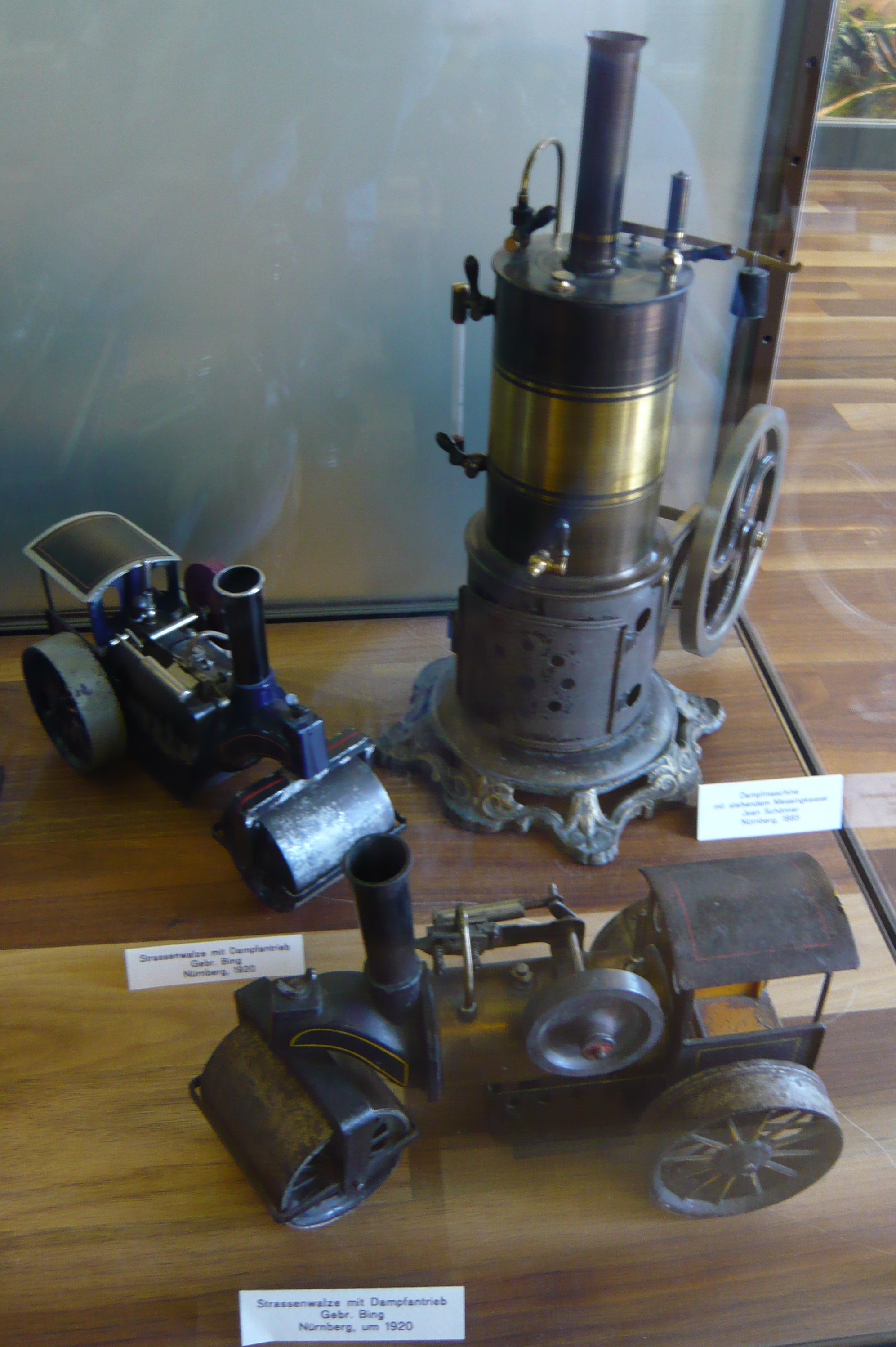
Two 1920 Bing steamrollers and an 1885 Schönner vertical model steam engine

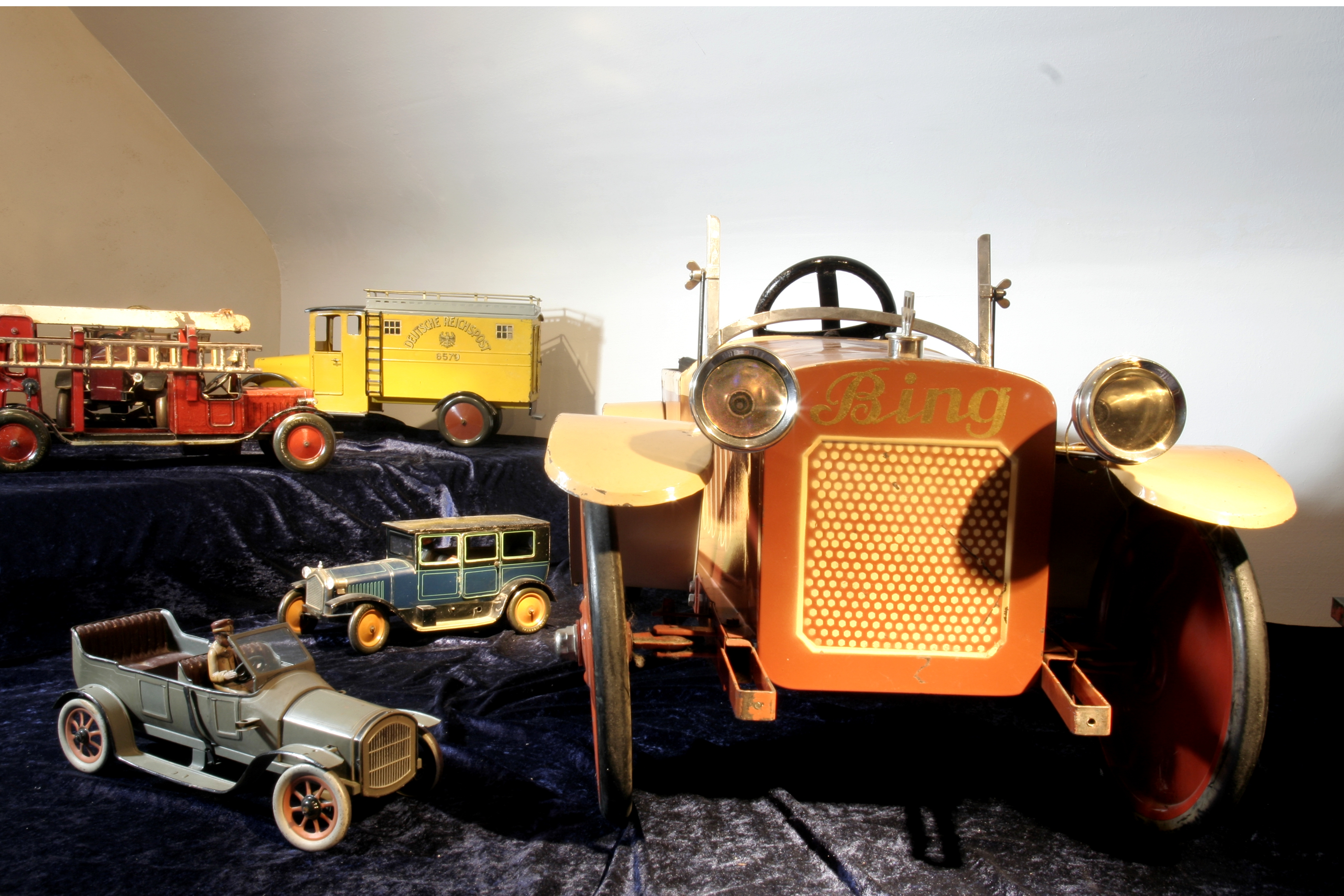
Assorted toy cars and pedal car

== See also ==
- Bassett-Lowke
- Bing (disambiguation)
- Bingola Records
- List of show caves in Germany
