= Bingola Records =

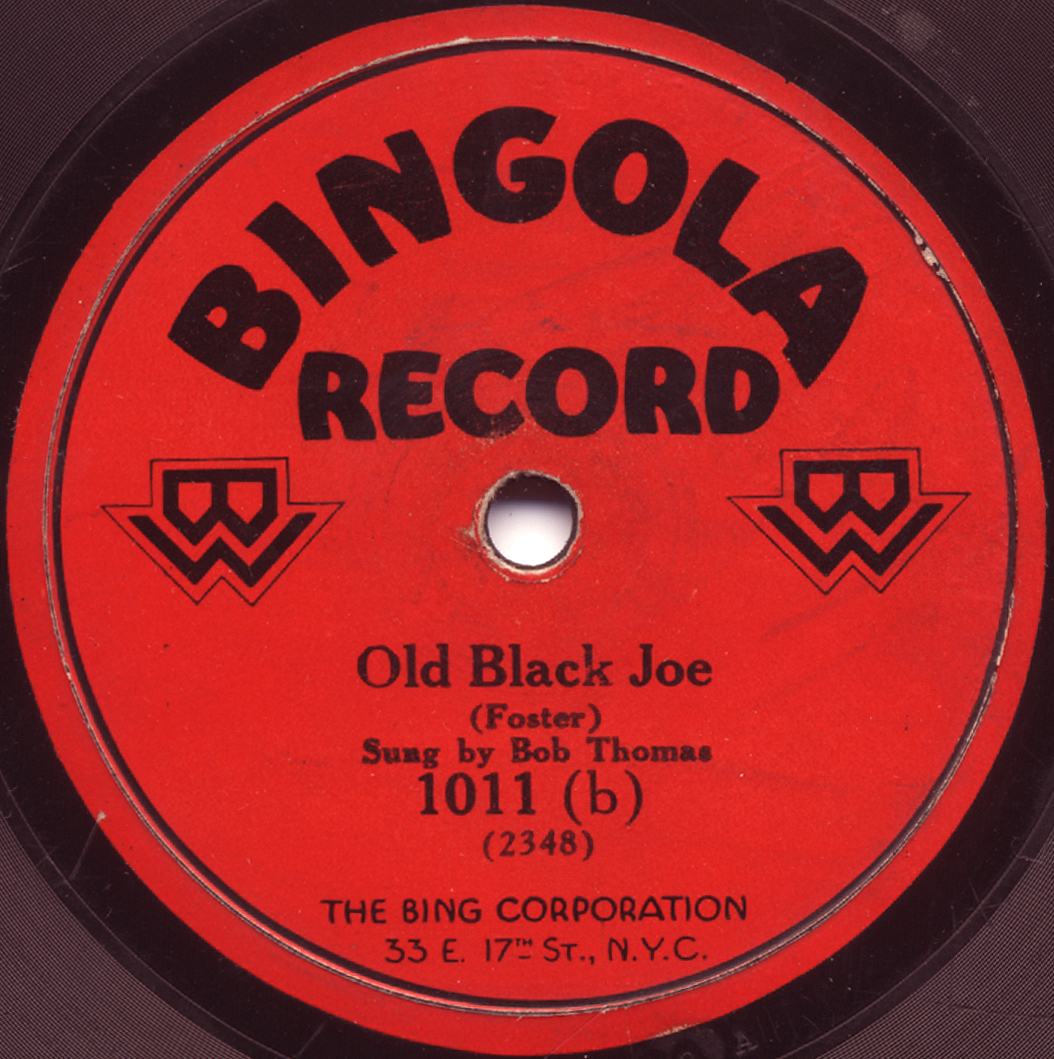
- The label of Bingola no. 1011. "Bob Thomas" is a pseudonym, possibly for Arthur Fields.
- Parent company: Grey Gull Records
- Founded: 1927
- Defunct: 1928

Bingola Records was a United States record label of the 1920s. It was manufactured by Grey Gull Records of Boston, Massachusetts, and is one of the rarest and most short-lived labels produced by that company.

The records were produced for the Bing Corporation of New York City, the U.S. branch of the German Bing Werke company of Nuremberg, which in 1925 had introduced its own line of phonographs called "Bingophone".

The Bingola label was registered as a trademark in October 1927 and seems to have been produced only briefly during this year and 1928. Known issues re-use ordinary Grey Gull masters, but the label's catalogue numbers (in a 1000-series) have no visible connection with the equivalent issues on the company's other labels.

Reference works long cited 1008 as the highest known catalogue number of a Bingola issue. However in 2008 a copy of Bingola 1011 (see photo) was sold by the vintage record dealer Kurt Nauck.

== See also ==
- List of record labels
- Grey Gull Records
- Bing Museum

== Sources ==
- Brian Rust: The American Record Label Book (New York, 1984)
- Allan Sutton: Directory of American Disc Record Brands and Manufacturers, 1891-1943 (Westport & London, 1994)
- Nauck's Vintage Records, auction catalogue #43 (spring 2008)
