= Binag, Sistan and Baluchestan =

Binag بينگ
- Village
- Location within Iran
- Coordinates: 27°44′00″N 61°02′00″E
- Country: Iran
- Province: Sistan and Baluchestan
- County: Khash
- Bakhsh: Irandegan
- Rural District: Kahnuk

Population (2006)
  - Total: 24
- Time zone: UTC+3:30 (IRST)
  - Summer (DST): UTC+4:30 (IRDT)

Binag (Persian: بينگ, also Romanized as Bīnag; also known as Bīnak) is a village in Kahnuk Rural District, Irandegan District, Khash County, Sistan and Baluchestan Province, Iran. At the 2006 census, its population was 24, in 7 families.
