= Bing Judd =

American politician

Member of New Hampshire House of Representatives for Coös 1
- In office 2016–2018

Personal details
- Party: Republican

Burnham "Bing" Judd is an American politician. He was a member of the New Hampshire House of Representatives and represented Coös 1st district.

From 1997 to 2012, he was a Coös County commissioner. Prior to 2012, Judd went unchallenged for the role for a decade. He lost his party's renomination in 2012 by seven votes against a politician against the construction of a hydroelectric dam.
