= Lee Bing =

Hong Kong singer

Lee Bing (-2012) was a Hong Kong mezzo-soprano. She is best known internationally for an LP Lee Bing sings ancient and modern Chinese poems (1988). Tokwawan, Kowloon, Hong Kong: HK.
