= Canadian Toy Train Association =

Canadian non-profit organization

- Formation: 1974
- Type: Model Railroading
- Headquarters: Burnaby, British Columbia, Canada
- Location: 3630 Lozells Avenue, Burnaby, BC V5A 2Y7
- Coordinates: 49°15′07″N 122°56′29″W
- Members: 200+
- President: Kyle Miller
- Key people: Gary Zabenskie, Vice President
- Website: canadiantoytrains.org

The Canadian Toy Train Association (CTTA) is a non-profit organization of toy train collectors and railway modellers interested in collecting O gauge, S gauge, and standard gauge model trains. Based in British Columbia, it was founded in March 1974 as a division of the Toy Train Operating Society and became an independent association in 2012 with members across Canada and the United States. The association holds monthly meetings at the Charles Rummel Community Centre in Burnaby.

== History ==
The association was incorporated in March 1974 under the British Columbia Societies Act as the first Canadian division of the Toy Train Operating Society. Founded by collectors including Alan Cruickshank, Larry Setterfield, and Clark Gray, its early presence spanned in British Columbia and Alberta with primary operations centered in the Greater Vancouver area. The inaugural monthly meeting was held on at 13:00 on March 31, 1974, at Cruickshank's residence in New Westminster. Through its early years, the association gathered at the homes of several members to operate and trade model trains.

The lack of Canadian rolling stock in standard gauge modelling prompted the association to begin commissioning manufacturers. The first order was placed with McCoy Trains in 1979 for a set consisting of an Esquimalt and Nanaimo boxcar, a White Pass and Yukon Route tanker, a Quebec, North Shore and Labrador hopper, a British Columbia Railway bulkhead flatcar, a Temiskaming and Northern Ontario reefer, a Howe Sound, Pemberton Valley and Northern caboose, and a Canadian Pacific 4-4-0 steam locomotive, with one item being released each year from 1980 to 1986. A Shawnigan Lake Lumber Company log car, regularly produced by McCoy Trains, was included for those who purchased the set.

The Club Car program officially commenced in 1996 with the release of a Pacific Great Eastern boxcar. Ever since, the association has collaborated with various model railway companies, such as MTH Electric Trains and Atlas, to produce rolling stock significant to Canadian rail history. Items are preordered due to their limited production quantity.

Beginning in 2010, members of the association grew concerned regarding representation from the Toy Train Operating Society based in California, leading to a call for withdrawal in June 2012. During the June meeting, members voted unanimously in favour of independence and subsequently submitted an official letter to the parent society. By January 2013, it successfully became a non-affiliated organization and was renamed the Canadian Toy Train Association.

== Membership ==
Memberships are available for all interested in the hobby, with annual fees costing $25.00. Members have access to the Club Car program and receive discounts.

== Meetings ==
Regular monthly meetings take place at the Charles Rummel Community Centre in Burnaby on the last Sunday of each month, with exceptions during July and August. Meetings typically feature sale tables, door prizes, auctions, and a buffet lunch for a $10.00 entry fee.

== Executive leadership ==
The organization is governed by a board of directors, consisting of a president, vice president, secretary, and treasurer. Past presidents include David Cook, appointed 2002, Mark Horne, appointed 2010, and Kyle Miller, the current titleholder elected in 2021.

== Publications ==
The official publication of the association is the Canadian Flyer, published monthly as a digital newsletter. It includes the President's Report, photos from member meetings, announcements of model orders, and occasional articles on rail history.

== See also ==
- West Coast Railway Association
