= High rail =

Realistic rail transport modelling form

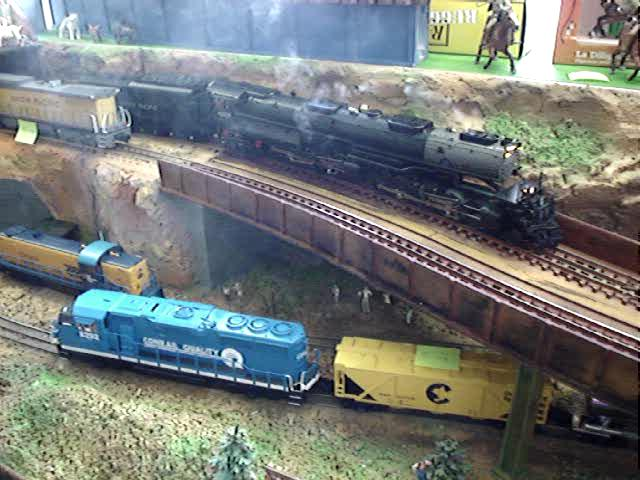
High rails on a model railway layout at the Convention of American Railroadfans in Switzerland, 2006

High rail (also called "hi-rail" and "hirail") is a phrase used in model railroading in North America, mostly in O scale and S scale, to describe a "compromise" form of modelling that strives for realism while accepting the compromises in scale associated with toy train equipment. The phrase exists due to the observation that traditional Lionel and American Flyer toy train track sits much higher than finescale track.

The compromises that were traditionally made in manufacturing these trains have led to three approaches to model railroading in these two scales.

The traditional toy train layout makes little, if any, effort at realism and often makes use of unpainted plastic buildings, particularly the Plasticville brand, and other toys, making little or no effort to disguise their origin. In some cases, the buildings, vehicles, and figures on the layout may not even be the same scale as the train, or each other. Roads, grass, and roadbed may be painted onto the table surface, or may be represented with low-pile carpet.

Scale modeling also occurs in O and S scales, just like in HO or N scales, where the modeler tries to create a miniature world that is as realistic as possible. Scale modelers in O and S scales will often avoid, or at least make limited use of, traditional American Flyer and Lionel locomotives and rolling stock since it sometimes was not very true to scale, was lacking in detail, and used oversized knuckle couplers. Scale modelers use O gauge track, but with two rails rather than the three rails used by Lionel, and the trains run on direct current. Numerous standards for track that is more true to scale exist for both O and S scales.

High rail is an in-between approach. High-railers live with the out-of-scale track and will make use of off-the-shelf diecast vehicles that may be slightly out of scale, especially in O scale because true 1:48 scale vehicles are scarce, whereas 1:43 and 1:50 scale diecast vehicles are very common. Some use vintage Lionel and American Flyer trains, while others opt to use modern equivalents built to greater detail. High railers often will repaint and weather their trains, vehicles, and buildings, just as a scale model railroader would. Sometimes they will go to great lengths to try to conceal the middle rail on Lionel track, and will replace the oversized couplers that came with their trains from the factory with scale versions. High railers are less likely to engage in scratch building than their scale modeling counterparts, but many engage in kitbashing and super-detailing their buildings and structures.

Some manufacturers, particularly in S scale, will offer rolling stock with either scale or high-rail trucks and couplers, in order to cater to all potential markets.
