= Unique Art =

American toy company

Unique Art Manufacturing Company was an American toy company, founded in 1916, based in Newark, New Jersey that made inexpensive toys, including wind-up mechanical toys, out of lithographed tin. One of its early products was a wind-up toy featuring two tin boxers.

The company scored a hit in the 1940s when it acquired the rights to a popular comic strip and released the Li'l Abner Dogpatch Band for Christmas 1945. The windup toy featured Abner dancing, Pappy on drums, Mammy with a drum stick, and Daisy Mae playing piano. Unique followed with a Howdy Doody band several years later.

Unique's president, Samuel Berger, was a good friend of toy magnate Louis Marx, and the two men's companies at times cooperated, with Marx providing tooling to Unique and sometimes acting as a distributor for Unique's products.

In 1949, Unique began producing lithographed tin O gauge toy trains, using tooling of its own design along with some recycled tooling from the defunct Dorfan Company. Unique sold its trains inexpensively, in boxed sets like Marx and also produced a circus set that was distributed on a car-by-car basis by the Jewel Tea Company. Marx saw this as a betrayal and responded with a new line similar in size to Unique's, but with lithographed rolling stock that looked more realistic. Unique found itself unable to compete, and withdrew its trains from the marketplace by 1951.

Although Unique only captured a small portion of the toy train craze of the early 1950s, a tin typewriter toy introduced during the same time frame did take market share away from Marx, who produced a similar toy. Marx responded by moving production of its typewriter toy to Japan in order to undercut Unique's price.

The circumstances surrounding Unique Art's eventual demise is unclear, but the company appears to have disappeared in 1952, when it was picked up in a corporate merger by the Jerry O'Mahony Diner Company, with some evidence of Marx picking up parts of the line.
