= Third rail (model rail) =

Type of electricity transmission of model railways

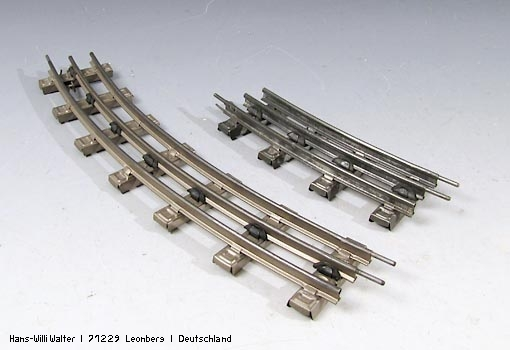
Early O gauge track pieces. All metal, with a small fibre insulating washer beneath each central rail chair.

The use of a third rail in rail transport modelling is a technique that was once applied, in order to facilitate easier wiring.

== Early train sets ==
Pre-war train sets from makers such as Hornby were almost entirely O scale, either clockwork or electric, with the electric sets using a three rail system. Both the track and rolling stock were made from pressed, lithographed tinplate, with a few pieces of die-cast zinc or turned brass. The third rail was insulated from the tinplate sleepers by insulating fibre washers.

Post-war, (Note: Hornby Dublo was released in 1938, but sold little before the war suspended production.) there was a shift from O gauge to half-size scales of HO and OO. Improved technology at this time, particularly for moulded plastic components, made two-rail electrification practical. Many of the new generation of scenic railway modellers scratch-built their new locomotives for two-rail, although this was far from universally accepted. Most of the commercial train set makers continued with three-rail systems for some time.

== Difficulties of two-rail ==
Using a two-rail electrification system for a model railway has a number of difficulties, for both track and rolling stock.

=== Track ===
Track obviously requires the two rails to be insulated from each other, and from the trackbed, if that is made of metal. If the track pieces are reversible, both rails must be insulated. Reliable running also requires accurate control of the track's gauge, all of which needed accurately injection-moulded plastic fittings, rather than the flexible fibre.

Pointwork was a further problem, as the frog and moving blades are connected to opposite rails, according to which direction in which the points are set. This requires either an insulated two-part frog, with the risk of poor contact to locomotives crossing it; or else an all-metal 'live' frog which must be insulated from the rails beyond the pointwork, and which usually requires an additional switch to give a reliable connection. In comparison, the three-rail system is simply isolated from the running lines.

Some layouts, such as a balloon loop, also create problems for two-rail, as they connect the opposing rails together around the loop and could require isolation.

=== Rolling stock ===
Carriages and wagons can use moulded plastic wheelsets, which are compatible with both three- and two-rail systems. Hornby Dublo introduced these in 1959, during their transition to two rail, when most users were still using three-rail layouts.

=== Locomotives ===
A two-rail locomotive must both avoid shorting the two running rails, and must also collect current from both sides independently. For a three-rail locomotive the wheels and axles are typically metal and the metal chassis may be used as a ground connection. This has the advantage that all wheels, including bogies, act as pickups. This gives a long collection length, reducing the problem of crossing supply gaps.

For two-rail, current collection is typically done by phosphor bronze spring strip collectors on the back of the wheel rims. If the wheels are insulated by using plastic wheels in metal rims, only the rim is available to a collector. Only those wheels, often two, with collector springs can collect current from the track. This can give problems for crossing gaps in pointwork. An alternative system is 'split frame' construction, which had some popularity for the early narrow gauges, such as N gauge and the modelling of narrow gauge prototypes. This uses conductive metal wheels and axles, where the axles are split in half as two sides, insulated from each other. The locomotive frames are split likewise. Rather than separate pickup springs, the axle bearings are used as the collectors. This technique is somewhat complicated for making the axles, but adapts more easily to narrower gauges. It can also easily collect current from all of the driving wheels, or even pony truck wheels too.

== Two-rail versus three-rail system ==
2 rail system

Early toy trains used two metal rail tracks like most real trains. However, manufacturers quickly found that using a center rail for electric power and the two outer rails for common or ground made electrical contact much more reliable and less prone to short circuits. Three rail contact also negates the need for insulated wheels, an important consideration before plastics became widely available. Most scales and gauges that predate H0 scale used three rails for electric operation.

=== Direction ===
Three-rail DC locomotives will move in the same direction, 'forwards', whenever the third rail has the same polarity, no matter which way round they are placed on the track. Two identical locomotives can move in different directions on the track, depending on which orientation they are placed on it.

In contrast, two-rail locos will move in the same direction relative to the track. If the loco is reversed, it will still move in the same (track-relative) direction. By convention, all locos are wired and geared to move consistently, so that double-heading trains is possible.

The Marklin stud contact system uses AC motors. These are independent of the supply polarity and instead use an internal switch, controlled by a higher-voltage pulse to reverse direction.

== Three-rail system ==
3 rail system

A key advantage for three-rail track is balloon loops, where a train enters a loop through a turnout and then exits through the same turnout in order to change the train's direction. With two-rail track, when the track reverses on itself, this causes a short circuit. With three-rail track, because the center rail remains constant and the outer rails are electrically identical, this causes no problems.

The third rail has also been used to automate and animate layouts. An accessory, such as a railway signal, can be wired to a section of track that has had one of its outer rails insulated (not grounded), either at the factory or by a hobbyist. A passing train then grounds the insulated rail, completing the circuit and causing the accessory to operate.

Insulated rails (or rail sections) can also be used to control turnouts, causing the turnout to switch to the position needed by an oncoming train.

Because of this feature, railroad cars intended for three-rail operation will not work on two-rail track unless their wheels are first insulated from each other. Cars intended for two-rail track will operate on three-rail track, but they will not activate controls wired to an insulated rail. Conversion of three-rail cars for two-rail operation, or vice versa, is thus a common practice among hobbyists. It requires either replacing the bogies (wheel assemblies) on the car, or replacing metal axles with axles made of a non-conductive material.

The main disadvantage of three-rail track is its lack of realism. While some real-world trains do use a third rail, the prototypes for the majority of model railroad operations do not. Lionel tried to improve this situation in the late 1950s with its Super O track, which blackened the middle rail and made it thinner to reduce its visibility. Other O scale manufacturers use similar techniques today.

== Stud contact ==
All insulated 3 rail system

Märklin uses a "phantom" third rail, where the middle rail is concealed in the track ballast or ties, with only studs protruding, giving the advantages of three-rail operation without seriously detracting from its realism. This is stud contact electrification for model railways and is often used on garden railway systems. Garden railways often have a mixture of electrical and real steam locomotives, and while it is possible, insulating model steam locomotives to run on two rail electrification systems is problematic. In practice the stud system outdoors has been found to be more resistant to continuity problems caused by the outdoor environment.

== Trix twin ==
Although most three-rail systems ties the two outer rails together electrically, some manufacturers wire all three rails independently. GarGraves is a North American manufacturer of O gauge three-rail track with all of its rails insulated. Trix Express is a European manufacturer of three-rail track who insulates all three rails.

On a simple, non-computerised layout only one train can run independently on either a two or three-rail system (two trains if combined with overhead lines). On the insulated three-rail type, two trains can run independently (three trains if combined with overhead lines).

== Outside third rail ==
In the early days of railway modeling, some O scale modelers (the dominant scale at the time), made use of an outside third rail and a shoe pickup system for power. This system had the benefit of being more realistic by removing the central third rail common to O scale track, while retaining an effective power source. As technology progressed, later developments in locomotive and track design would allow for two rail operation, and ultimately rendered the practice obsolete.

== See also ==
- Rail terminology
