= Dorfan =

American Toy Company

Dorfan was an American toy company based in Newark, New Jersey from 1924 to 1934.

Their production lines specialized in O gauge and Wide gauge toy trains.

== History ==
Bringing years of previous toy making experience, Milton and Julius Forcheimer, two immigrant cousins from Nuremberg, Germany, whose family was involved in the production of Fandor trains founded Dorfan in 1924. The Fandor brand name is an amalgam of Fannie & Dora (who were the mothers of Milton & Julius). When Milton & Julius immigrated to America, they reversed the names Dora & Fannie to create the Dorfan name. A Fandor engineer, John C. Koerber, helped to get Dorfan started (McKenney 1993; Dorfan, pp. 165–166).

Dorfan entered into a well developed American market for electric trains. A market dominated by Ives, Lionel and American Flyer. But it entered at a most opportune time, the American market was in an upswing. Dorfan gained considerable market share through promotion, innovation and manufacture. Dorfan gained enough ground to be included among the "Big Four" of American prewar model train manufacturers (McKenney, Greenberg 1993; Dorfan, pp. 5–6,163–165).

Dorfan produced detailed tinplate rolling stock with diecast power units. Dorfan was the first U.S. train manufacturer to use die casting in its manufacturing process. They had developed an alloy train body that would withstand a fall to a concrete floor without breaking. Dorfan was also the first to have "Distance Remote Control", a reversing unit without a fixed sequence. Dorfan is also noted as one of the first to have passenger figures visible in coach windows. However, being the pioneer of something at times has its disadvantages. Dorfan's alloys suffered from impurities, which weakened the metal and caused the trains to disintegrate over time, an early victim of zinc pest. Dorfan replaced the damaged parts, but at great expense. Dorfan was also unique in its approach of building model trains that could be easily disassembled and reassembled, encouraging its customers to take the trains apart and learn how they worked (McKenney, 1993; Dorfan, pp. 166–167).

At its peak, Dorfan had about 150 employees, but the Great Depression crippled the company and was not able to recover. It ended production in 1934, although old inventory was sold at least until 1936 (McKenney 1993; Dorfan, pp. 165–166).

Because of the inevitable deterioration of the engine castings, limited numbers of Dorfan trains survive today, making them among the highly sought after models by collectors.

Some of the Dorfan tooling was later used by Unique Art to make its tinplate trains in the early 1950s (McKenney, 1993; Dorfan, pp. 166).

== See also ==
- Toy train manufacturers
