= Williams Electric Trains =

Defunct American toy train manufacturer based in Columbia, Maryland, United States

Williams Electric Trains was an American model railroad manufacturer, based in Columbia, Maryland. Williams was sold to Kader via their subsidiary Bachmann Industries in October 2007, and is now identified as "Williams by Bachmann."

It was founded in 1971 by Jerry Williams as a maker of reproductions of vintage Lionel and Ives Standard gauge trains. Williams had acquired some of the original tooling from the original Lionel Corporation after it sold the rights to the name to General Mills in 1969. In the 1980s Williams acquired tooling that had once belonged to Kusan, an obscure Lionel competitor from the 1950s, and its product line shifted to O scale. Williams eventually discontinued its tinplate offerings, selling the old Lionel tooling to the company that later became MTH Electric Trains.

Although today Williams is often considered a maker of reproduction 1950s-era Lionel equipment, Williams' offerings are distinguishable from the Lionel originals because Williams sometimes adds details that were not possible using 1950s manufacturing methods.

Unlike most other O scale manufacturers, Williams never added electronics such as Trainmaster Command Control or Digital Command System to its locomotives. This decision gained Williams a small but devoted following among those hobbyists who want a more "traditional" train layout reminiscent of the 1950s but who want to buy modern equipment. However, this decision has also allowed companies such as MTH and K-Line to eclipse it in size in spite of being an older company.
