= Standard Gauge (toy trains) =

Model railroad gauge

- Scale ratio: approx. 1:32
- Model gauge: 2 1/8 in (53.975 mm)

Standard Gauge, also known as wide gauge, was an early model railway and toy train rail gauge, introduced in the United States in 1906 by Lionel Corporation.

== Scale ==
As it was a toy standard, rather than a scale modeling standard, the actual scale of Standard Gauge locomotives and rolling stock varied, but the nominal scale ratio was given as 1:32, about 50 percent larger than O scale (1:48).

Standard gauge equipment ran on three-rail track, whose running rails were 2 1/8 in (53.975 mm) apart.

== Origins ==
Lionel dubbed its new standard "Standard Gauge" and trademarked the name. Lionel's Standard Gauge is distinct from the standard gauge of real railroads, and the later 1:64 scale S gauge popularized by American Flyer after World War II. Due to the trademark, Lionel's competitors mostly called their similar offerings "wide gauge".

Historians offer two alternative explanations for the creation of Standard Gauge. One is that Lionel misread the specifications for Märklin's European Gauge 2, measuring the distance between the inside portion of the rails rather than between the centers of the rails as Märklin did, thus accidentally making a slightly larger and incompatible standard. The other possibility is that the change was a deliberate effort to forestall European competition by creating incompatible trains. While many believe the latter is more likely, since several U.S. companies such as Carlisle & Finch were producing trains to that standard, no definitive proof in favor of either theory has ever surfaced.

Standard Gauge production began in 1906 or 1907. A Lionel catalog exists showing Standard Gauge with a post mark that appears to indicate 1906; however, most collectors feel that production did not begin until 1907, and that Lionel manufactured their 2 7/8 inch gauge line through 1906.

== Lionel's competitors ==
Whatever the reason for its initial creation, Lionel's Standard Gauge caught on at the expense of gauges 1 and 2. No fewer than four American competitors adopted Lionel's gauge: Ives in 1921, Boucher in 1922, Dorfan in 1924, and American Flyer in 1925.

While all the manufacturers' track was the same size and the trains and buildings approximately the same scale, the couplers for the most part remained incompatible, making it impossible to mix train cars from different manufacturers without modification.

The increased number of manufacturers seemed to give legitimacy to Lionel's gauge. The boom of the 1920s made large toy trains affordable and Standard Gauge had its heyday in the mid-1920s only to virtually disappear during the Great Depression. Ives filed for bankruptcy in 1928 and its offerings were off the market by 1932. American Flyer discontinued its Standard Gauge trains in 1932. Dorfan went out of business in 1934. Lionel discontinued Standard Gauge trains in 1940. Boucher, the last of the wide gauge manufacturers, folded in 1943.

O gauge (1:48) was smaller and less expensive to manufacture, and it required less space to operate a layout. Thus, it became the most popular scale in the United States almost by default.

== Decline ==
Lionel did not introduce a new Standard Gauge piece after 1933.

In 1937, there were some Lionel 500 series cars that were created with new trucks that had box couplers. This shows that Lionel invested in tooling to modernize Standard Gauge, but ultimately did not put them into production.

The toy train market evolved into scale modeling. Lionel's prized 700e Hudson was cataloged in O-gauge from 1937 as their top-of-the-line train. The larger Standard Gauge no longer symbolized top-of-the-line Lionel. Lionel last showed Standard Gauge in their 1940 catalogs, ultimately only offering rolling stock, which suggests they were selling off existing inventory.

== After 1940 ==
After 1940, Standard Gauge vanished from North American retail markets, but it managed to survive in South America. Doggenweiler, a firm in Chile, produced a small quantity of trains in Standard Gauge and Gauge 2 from 1933 until about 1960.

In the 1950s, Standard Gauge was revived in the United States by the small firm McCoy Manufacturing, who produced trains of original design well into the 1990s.

In the 1970s, Williams Electric Trains began producing and marketing reproductions of Lionel trains of the 1920s and 1930s. This line was later marketed by Lionel itself, and was produced and marketed by MTH Electric Trains until 2021 when Mike Wolf retired and split up the company.

In 2002, Lionel produced two new Standard Gauge sets, one based on the New York Central's Commodore Vanderbilt trainset, and the other on Milwaukee Road's Hiawatha.

A number of smaller manufacturers, mostly one- and two-person operations, have hand-built and marketed reproductions of very early Standard Gauge trains.

== Manufacturers ==
- American Flyer
- Bing
- Boucher
- Dorfan
- Ives
- Lionel Corporation
- McCoy
- MTH
- Williams

== See also ==
- 1 gauge
- 2 gauge
- O scale
- Rail transport modelling
- Rail transport modelling scales
- Third rail (model rail)
