= Trainmaster Command Control =

Digital model train control system

Trainmaster Command (TMCC) is Lionel's electronic control system for O scale 3-rail model trains and toy trains that mainly ran from 1994 to 2006. Conceptually it is similar to Digital Command Control (DCC), the industry's open standard used by HO scale and other 2-rail DC trains. It has one advantage over DCC, in that TMCC-equipped locomotives can run simultaneously with non-TMCC locomotives and Lionel Legacy engines as well as LionChief and LionChief Plus equipped locomotives. The latter require a dedicated remote controller. MTH Corporation's DCS controller can be configured to control TMCC locomotives, and all four systems (TMCC, Legacy, LionChief/LionChief+ and DCS) can be operated on the same track simultaneously. Each simply requires a constant track voltage (18 volts). TMCC/Legacy "broadcasts" its signal to the antenna on the locomotives which listen for signals that first identify the particular locomotive by number and then it issues given commands as to speed, direction, sounds, lighting and other features. DCS performs similar functions but transmits a carrier over the rails which are picked up through the locomotive's electrical pickup contacts. While TMCC/Legacy and DCS remote controls relay operator commands to a device that transmits them to the train (Command Base or Track Interface Unit), LionChief/LionChief+ also issue remote control commands but the remote and locomotive are married and each locomotive requires a separate remote control. This system requires no additional wiring as the control is directly "narrowcast" to the locomotive in the same way as a television remote control or garage door opener functions. In 2017, Lionel released a universal remote for LionChief+ that will learn addresses for up to three locos at a time, simplifying the operation of multiple trains.

TMCC permits operation of multiple trains on the same track without complex wiring, and also gives locomotives realistic digitized sounds.

Its development was backed financially by rock and roller Neil Young as part of a partnership between Young and one-time Lionel owner Richard Kughn known as Liontech. Liontech, roughly headquartered on Young's northern California ranch, consisted of a loose confederation of technology developers whom Young had assembled to help develop individual components of the TrainMaster Command system.

Chief among these contributors was Applied Design Laboratories of Grass Valley, California, headed by Atari 2600 co-patent holder Ron Milner. Young had been referred to Milner by his neighbor and friend, Nolan Bushnell, co-founder of Atari. Milner's team (consisting of numerous members, including Robert Johnson and Bryan Scott) developed the main elements of the Command system, including the innovation of using the Lionel steel tubular track system as a broadcast antenna for digital signals overlaying the electrical power being delivered through the track to locomotives, rolling stock and connected accessories. In larger layout practical application, the use of the track as an antenna has fallen somewhat short of success, however and a separate antenna wire stapled along the right-of-way has proven to solve the problem.

Also included in the TrainMaster Command system is RailSounds, which provides digital sound effects to complement the digital control features of the system. RailSounds was developed by a separate team of technologists in the Bay Area. An early, distinguishing feature of RailSounds was that each individual locomotive system (e.g. a "Hudson" 4-6-4 steam locomotive) was based on a real-life counterpart, not a generic "steam" sound. The Lionel RailSounds Hudson sound system was captured by the Liontech team on location in West Vancouver, British Columbia, Canada, using the former Canadian Pacific "Royal Hudson" as the sound model.

During the 90's Lionel Boom Years, TMCC became one of the most popular O Scale remote systems to use. Introduced in 1994, from the years 1996 to 2002, it had its biggest boom but sales for the TMCC declined since technology had soon caught up with the TMCC system but is still available and many Legacy engines and MTH DCS engines do allow the operation of the older TMCC remote system. By 2006, TMCC was replaced by the Cab-2 and the LEGACY system. TMCC today is used in Lionel products mainly in motorized units, switches, and some accessories.

Lionel has since licensed TMCC to some of its competitors, including 3rd Rail, Atlas O, K-Line, and Weaver. Aftermarket circuit boards are available to add TMCC to O scale and S scale trains that lack the capability.

Neil Young's involvement in Liontech was the direct reason for his becoming aware of Kughn's putting Lionel Trains, Inc. up for sale in early 1995. Young saw an opportunity to become at least part owner in the company he revered, and working with Liontech team member Jim Bunte, assembled a marketing plan to attract investors to help underwrite the purchase price. After several meetings with potential lead equity partners, a deal was struck with Martin Davis, former chairman of Paramount / Gulf+Western, who had recently divested his ownership in that company to Sumner Redstone of Viacom. With his proceeds, Davis founded Wellspring Associates, a New York-based investment firm. The acquisition of Lionel Trains, Inc. and its September 1995 transformation into Lionel LLC was Wellspring's first investment.

The competitor MTH uses a similar system, called DCS.

== TMCCII Legacy ==
In their 2006 Volume 2 catalog, Lionel officially unveiled the new TMCCII "Legacy" system. TMCCII promises to revolutionize the way people control and play with their model trains, by adding more features that mimic prototypical operations of a real railroad, and subsequently, a real locomotive. TMCCII is backwards-compatible with existing TMCC modules, and can work simultaneously with CAB-1 controller.

Like TMCCI, the core of the "Legacy" system is the handheld remote. The CAB-2 remote features, among other new functions, a back-lit LCD screen, back-lit LCD touchscreen keypad (which can toggle between numbers and control icons), a Feedback mode (the controller rumbles reflecting the struggling engine), and rechargeable batteries.

The first locomotive to feature TMCCII is the Union Pacific Big Boy. At the moment, only the CAB-2 remote and command base are available, with additional modules being released in due course. The second locomotive that was released was the American Flyer New York Central which arrived back in April 2007.
