= Lionel, LLC =

American toy designer

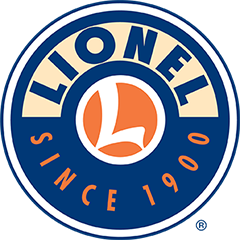
- Type: Private
- Industry: Toy & Hobby Importing; Licensing
- Predecessor: Lionel Trains, Inc. (1986–1995); Lionel MPC (1970–1986); Lionel Corporation (1900–1969)
- Founded: 1995; 31 years ago
- Defunct: March 6, 2026
- Headquarters: Concord, North Carolina, U.S.
- Key people: Richard Barry (CEO); Howard Hitchcock (president and COO)
- Products: Model trains
- Revenue: US$62 million (2006)
- Owner: Lionel Brands Group (merger of Round 2, LLC and Lionel, LLC)
- Website: lionel.com

Lionel, LLC, was an American company that was in the business of designing and importing toy trains and model railroads headquartered in Concord, North Carolina. Its roots lay in the 1969 purchase of the Lionel product line from the Lionel Corporation by cereal conglomerate General Mills and subsequent purchase in 1986 by businessman Richard P. Kughn forming Lionel Trains, Inc. in 1986. The Marvin Davis Investment Group (Wellspring) bought Lionel Trains, Inc. in 1995 and renamed it Lionel, LLC. In 2026, Lionel, LLC merged with Round 2, LLC forming the company Lionel Brands Group.

According to its reorganization papers filed as part of its bankruptcy plan on May 21, 2007, about 95% of the company's sales came from O scale trains. The plan estimated that about US$70 million worth of O scale trains were sold each year, and that Lionel, LLC accounted for about 60% of that market, making it the largest manufacturer of O scale trains.

== Lionel Racing ==
In late 2010, Lionel, LLC entered a joint venture with NASCAR Team Properties to produce NASCAR diecast vehicles that are both 1:24 and 1:64 scale. In 2013, Lionel would acquire full ownership and rename it to Lionel Racing. Lionel has also produced NHRA and ARCA diecast. In 2016, Lionel Racing took over distribution of the NASCAR Authentics line from Spin Master which consists of 1:64 diecast models of NASCAR race cars that are found inside major stores like Target, Walmart, Meijer, and Toys “R” Us.

== Lionel Eras ==
=== Early history ===
The original Lionel Corporation was founded in 1900 by Joshua Lionel Cowen and Harry C. Grant in New York City. Cowen designed his first train, the No. 5 electric locomotive, not as a toy, but as an eye-catching display for toy stores. The first electric train, debuted in 1901 was called The Electric Express and by 1906 they had become well established. The first electric trains were powered by wet-cell batteries, which were later replaced with 110 volt transformers, for safety reasons. In 1915 the company introduced Lionel O gauge trains, which became their most popular product, however the company was impacted by the Great Depression (October of 1929 to September of 1939). In 1939 the Standard gauge was discontinued, as consumers were instead purchasing the smaller Lionel O gauge trains, for economic reasons. Production was temporarily put on hold during World War Two,but one cardboard set came out not the most popular though. But with Lionel O gauge model railroad sets becoming popular once the war had ended. Between 1945 and 1969 the company used magnetic knuckle couplers and remote uncoupling. Diesel engines were introduced in 1948. the television impacted their success and the company began to decline after the Cowen family left, eventually filing for bankruptcy in 1967 in 1969 the company was bought by General Mills which started the MPC/General Mills era.

=== MPC/General Mills era (1970–1986) ===
Lionel Corporation sold the tooling for its then-current product line and licensed the Lionel name to General Mills in 1969, who then operated Lionel as a division of its subsidiary Model Products Corporation, or MPC, beginning in 1970. General Mills did not buy the company, however. The Lionel Corporation became a holding company and invested in a number of ventures, including what would eventually become an East Coast chain of toy stores known as "Lionel Leisure World".

Lionel struck a deal with General Mills to lease the Lionel name for ten years starting in 1970. This deal included the purchase of a portion of the Lionel tooling and as part of the agreement, production & sale of the 1969 train product line would be handled by the Lionel Corporation. The balance of the tooling was purchased on December 31, 1969. The lease was renegotiated in 1974.

Due to General Mills' cost-cutting measures, production of Lionel-branded toy and model trains returned to profitability, but sometimes at the expense of quality. Detail was often sacrificed, and most of the remaining metal parts were replaced with molded plastic. A number of MPC's changes to the product line endure to the present day, the most noticeable being the use of needlepoint axles and trucks made of Delrin, two changes made to reduce friction and allow longer trains. Also starting in 1973, MPC experimented with a line of cars it called "Standard O," which were scaled to 1:48 (most postwar Lionel and MPC production was undersize for O scale). The experiment's failure is generally blamed on MPC's lack of a 1:48 locomotive and caboose to go with the cars; when it was repeated in the 1980s with locomotives of appropriate size, it proved more successful.

An internal reorganization after 1973 caused Lionel to become part of General Mills' Fundimensions group. Although Lionel's tenure with MPC was relatively short, "MPC" is the most commonly used term for the 1970–1985 era.

In 1979, General Mills resurrected the American Flyer brand and product line, which Lionel Corporation had originally purchased in 1967 from its bankrupt competitor (The A. C. Gilbert Company of New Haven, Connecticut). American Flyer products by Gilbert made after World War II are scaled roughly to a 1:64 proportion and are known as S gauge; their most distinctive feature, however, is that they operate on two-rail track as opposed to Lionel's three-rail trackage system.

After a period of time of absence in the market, Gilbert American Flyer S gauge trains were no longer considered a direct competitor to Lionel's 1:48 proportion O gauge trains. To this day, Lionel markets American Flyer S gauge in limited quantities for the operator and collector markets.

The year 1982 brought General Mills' poorly received move of train production from the United States to Mexico. Some Lionel fans were angry simply because the trains had been made in the United States for more than 80 years, while others criticized the quality of the Mexican-produced trains. Lionel production returned to the United States by 1984. During this time, corporate offices were retained at the company's Mount Clemens (later, Chesterfield), Michigan, location.

When General Mills spun off its Kenner-Parker division in 1985, Lionel became part of Kenner-Parker. The Lionel product line was sold again in 1986, this time to toy-train collector and real estate developer Richard P. Kughn of Detroit, Michigan, who formed Lionel Trains, Inc. (LTI).

=== Lionel Trains, Inc./Richard Kughn era (1986–1995) ===
In 1986, Detroit-based real estate developer (and railroad enthusiast) Richard Kughn bought the brand and established Lionel Trains, Inc.

In 1989, Lionel, LLC made the switch from the MPC Sound of Steam to the new and improved Railsounds 1.0, heralding a new era of high-tech audio realism. Some of the engines to get this new sound system were the A6 switcher, Reading T1, and the New York Central Mohawk. In 1995, Lionel introduced the Trainmaster Command Control (TMCC) system along with the fully digital Railsounds 2.5. Engines that got this control and sound system were mostly Hudsons, like the 1995 Lionel No. 490 C&O Hudson, the 1995 Boston and Albany 618 Hudson, and the 1996 Lionel Commodore Vanderbilt. Others soon followed like the articulated engines in 1999 and 2000.

In 1991, the most popular toy train, the Santa Fe F3 was reintroduced with RailSounds. In 1992 Richard Kughn and musician Neil Young, an avid model railroader, created Liontech, chartered to develop exclusive new model train control and sound systems. Liontech's RailSounds II debuted in 1994.

In 1994, TMCC (Trainmaster Command Control), the brainchild of Neil Young, was introduced. Abbreviated as TMCC, it is a technology similar to Digital Command Control which permits, among other things, the operation of Lionel trains by remote control. This allowed collectors to walk around their layout while still being in control of their trains. It introduced new features like whistle, bell, chugging, diesel roar, electro-couplers, and the ability to turn RailSounds on or off.

Richard Kughn sold Lionel in 1995 to the Martin Davis Investment Group (Wellspring), which owned Lionel, LLC from 1995 to 2000 before giving the CEO rights to Richard Maddox.

=== Wellspring era (1995–present) ===
Lionel changed hands again in 1995, when Kughn sold controlling interest in the company to an investment group that included Neil Young and the holding company Wellspring Capital Management, which was headed by former Paramount Communications (formerly Gulf+Western) chairman Martin Davis (he had left the board of Viacom, which bought Paramount the previous year). The new company became known as Lionel, LLC. The company continued marketing reproductions of its vintage equipment, and the trend towards producing new equipment that was ever-more-detailed continued. Young now had a 20% stake in the company.

In order to proliferate Trainmaster Command Control as a standard, Lionel licensed it to several of its competitors, including K-Line. Lionel, LLC continued to manufacture and market trains and accessories in O scale under the Lionel brand and S gauge under the American Flyer brand. While most of the American Flyer products are re-issues using old Gilbert tooling from the 1950s, the O scale equipment is a combination of new designs and reissues.

In 1996 and 1997, the Lionel Century Club was unveiled to the public. It featured the 726 Berkshire, the GG-1, the 773 Hudson, the NYC F3, and the Pennsy O-27 scale turbine. All retained their postwar look with the latest technology at the time. In 1998, Century Club II was announced and released with one of the engines being a NYC 4-8-4 Niagara with cab number No. 6024.

Also in 1997 and 1998, the Postwar Celebration Series began. This series featured postwar trains, accessories, transformers, and cars retaining postwar looks with the latest technologies. The series lasted from 1997–2011.

In 1999 and 2000, there was big demand for high-end articulated steam engines. In 1999, Lionel, LLC manufactured the first three articulated steam engines. Those three are the N&W A Class, The Allegheny, and the Big Boy, manufactured in early 1998, 1999, and 2000, respectively. Since 1998, Lionel has made more than 10 different types of articulated steam engines.

Lionel made a gold and platinum plated 700E hudson to celebrate their centennial in 2000. It featured Trainmaster command control, Railsounds, and Electrocouplers.

In 1999, The Texas Special was fitted with RailSounds and critics pointed out that it had the best diesel horn Lionel ever produced. The set came with a powered A-unit, a non-powered B-unit, a non-powered A-unit, two coach cars, a dome car, and an observation car. The train came in a Lionel Postwar Celebration Series box and was a TMCC engine.

In April 2000, competitor and former partner MTH Electric Trains filed a trade secret misappropriation lawsuit against Lionel, LLC, saying that one of Lionel's subcontractors had acquired plans for an MTH locomotive design and used them to design locomotives for Lionel. The suit eventually went to trial, and on June 7, 2004, a jury in Detroit, Michigan, found Lionel liable and awarded MTH US$40,775,745. Lionel announced it would appeal, and two weeks later filed for bankruptcy, citing the judgment as the main reason. On November 1, 2004, a federal judge upheld the jury's decision. On December 14, 2006, the judgment was overturned on appeal, citing legal mistakes in the jury trial, and a new trial was ordered.

In 2001, Lionel closed its last manufacturing plant in the United States, outsourcing production to Korea and China. While this move proved unpopular with some longtime fans, the backlash was minor in comparison to the failed move of production to Mexico in the 1980s. The company also licensed the Lionel name to numerous third parties, who have marketed various Lionel-branded products since 1995.

In early 2002, Lionel decided to put out fantastic models in black boxes that read "Joshua Lionel Cowen Series". The JLC Series ran from 2002–2012 as a 10-year anniversary for Lionel's first CEO and president, Joshua Lionel Cowen. It became a hit with collectors.

In 2003, Lionel made RailSounds sets for the first time under NYC and Santa Fe Railroads. In 2006, TMCC was phased out when Lionel unveiled their new "Legacy" system.

On May 27, 2004, Union Pacific Railroad sued Athearn (another manufacturer of model railroad equipment) and Lionel for trademark infringement. The railroad claimed both companies put the names and logos of UP, as well as the names and logos of various fallen flag railroads UP had acquired over the years, on their model railroad products without a license. While Athearn quickly settled and acquired a license, Lionel initially resisted, arguing that it and its predecessor companies had been using the logos for more than 50 years, and had been encouraged or even paid to do so. On September 13, 2006, Lionel and UP settled the suit for US$640,000 plus a royalty on future sales.

In September 2004, the company dismissed its CEO, Bill Bracy, and replaced him with Jerry Calabrese, a former Marvel Entertainment and NASCAR executive. Along with Bracy, another 17 high-level employees were also dismissed.

In July 2005, Lionel sued competitor K-Line for theft of trade secrets. The two companies settled out of court but the settlement quickly fell apart, leading to K-Line declaring bankruptcy and selling its assets to Sanda Kan, a Chinese subcontractor who did manufacturing for both K-Line and Lionel. In January 2006, Sanda Kan licensed the K-Line name and intellectual property to Lionel.

On March 27, 2008, a bankruptcy judge approved Lionel's reorganization plan, including a settlement with MTH. Although the specifics were to remain sealed, the Associated Press reported that Lionel settled with MTH for US$12 million.

The 2004 Christmas movie The Polar Express, based on the children's book of the same name, provided Lionel with its first hit in years. Lionel produced a train set based on the movie, and stronger-than-anticipated demand caused highly publicized shortages. Various news stories told of a reporter's quest to locate a set, and some dealers marked the prices up above the suggested retail price of US$229. Sets turned up on eBay with buy-now prices of $449 as Lionel ordered an additional production run but said it would not be able to deliver the additional sets until March of the following year. The set remains a popular seller in the product line in 2012.

In 2006, the Lionel electric train was inducted into the National Toy Hall of Fame, along with the Easy-Bake Oven. It was the first time an electric toy had ever been inducted. That same year, Lionel made a bigger push to sell its train sets outside of hobby shops, selling them in stores such as FAO Schwarz, Macy's, and Target. By November 2006, the company had turned a US$760,000 profit on sales of US$55 million.

In 2009, Lionel launched a series of the most highly detailed model trains they have ever made called Visionline. The latest addition to Visionline is the GS series of steam locomotives.

In 2010, Lionel decided to remove RailSounds from train sets, using basic TrainSounds instead. In 2013, Lionel introduced "LionChief" Remote control trains to introduce wireless remote control to their starter sets. These sets feature enhanced sounds and long-distance wireless control. In 2013, Lionel RailSounds sets were discontinued when Lionel unveiled the LionChief system. In 2014, Lionel revealed LionChief Plus as a new standard for their train sets.

In April 2014, Jerry Calabrese stepped down as president and CEO and was replaced by Howard Hitchcock, former senior vice president and general manager. In August of that year, Lionel moved their service center to their headquarters in Charlotte, North Carolina.

In July 2016, Lionel re-entered into the HO scale market for the first time since 1990 by introducing the Polar Express in HO. In 2020, a large expansion to Lionel's HO scale lineup happened when they released a 2-8-2 Mikado and many other stock products.

In 2021, Lionel moved their main manufacturing plant from China to Vietnam.

As of 2025, Lionel operates two retail stores in the United States in shopping malls. One retail store is located at Concord Mills in Concord, North Carolina and the other store is located at Opry Mills in Nashville, Tennessee. Other retail stores and hobby shops still sell Lionel products today.

In March 2026, Lionel LLC merged with collectibles company Round 2, LLC, the combined company named Lionel Brands Group.

== Bankruptcy ==
On November 15, 2004, Lionel, LLC filed for Chapter 11 bankruptcy protection, citing the US$40 million-plus judgment in the MTH lawsuit as the primary factor. In the filing, it listed $55 million in debt and $42 million in assets. The largest secured creditor was PNC Financial Services Corp., owed $31 million. The MTH judgment was not included in the $55 million figure. On July 26, 2006, Lionel's bankruptcy judge ordered that Lionel submit a plan for emerging from bankruptcy within 75 days of the appeals court's verdict on the MTH lawsuit. On December 14, 2006, a federal appeals court determined that the company was entitled to a new trial, and that their reorganized plan should be filed by March 1, 2007.

Subsequently, on March 27, 2008 Judge Burton R. Lifland, of the U.S. Bankruptcy Court in New York, approved Lionel LLC's Chapter 11 reorganization plan, clearing the way for the company to exit bankruptcy. According to Lionel chief executive Jerry Calabrese, the plan called for the company to pay all its creditors in full with interest, whilst the company itself would also obtain up to US$40 million in loans to fund its exit from Chapter 11, pay off its creditors and fund its working capital needs in the future.

In regard to the MTH lawsuit, recent filings revealed Lionel agreed to pay MTH $12 million in cash to settle the lawsuit and a separate suit involving patented smoke-puffing technology.

Lionel's Chapter 11 plan also called for private equity firm Guggenheim Partners to contribute $37.1 million to the reorganized Lionel company, which consequently would now own 48.6 percent of the new Lionel. Similarly, the plan also called for the estate of the deceased Martin S. Davis (former chairman of Gulf+Western Industries/Paramount Communications Inc.) to provide $21.9 million to Lionel, and the Davis estate would now have a 28.6 percent share in the reorganized company. Guggenheim Partners's and the Davis estate's funding totaled $59 million for the reorganization plan; they would also loan Lionel an additional $10 million in second-lien debt. As a result, Calabrese expected the company to be out of bankruptcy "within a week".

Following the reorganization plan, Young was no longer a minority shareholder in the Lionel company; however, Calabrese insisted that the company wanted him to remain involved, claiming that he would have an "ongoing role in the company", but that this role would be "up to [Neil]". The pair organized a meeting on March 28, 2008. As of 2012, Young remains an active consultant in the company's Legacy and other high-end products.

On May 1, 2008, Lionel was fully out of bankruptcy.

== Collector value ==
Lionel trains are often sought by collectors, but the value of each piece can vary greatly. In general, older pieces tend to be more sought after due to age, rarity and nostalgia. The collector value of "modern era" Lionel trains has been limited by comparison to the trains produced by Lionel Corporation prior to 1969. As another generation grows nostalgic for this era, values may increase. As with any collectible, condition and rarity are important in assessing value. In addition, reissues and reproductions by Lionel and others have somewhat decreased the collector value and made it more difficult to authenticate vintage Lionel and American Flyer equipment. There are numerous collectors guides to help buyers make informed decisions on authenticity and value.

Currently, Lionel markets its products to several levels of skills and budget. As in the past, the higher-end, limited run products tend to retain the highest collectible value for the future. These products include the Legacy equipped steam and diesel locomotives which are accurate and highly detailed scale models. Lionel introduced the Vision Line of locomotives and cars in 2009, with the goal of providing the most innovative and detailed O gauge models available. Ready-to-run sets and cars are also offered at lower price points. These sets are in the tradition of, and many are reproductions of, the entry-level sets of the classic Lionel era. In March 2012, Lionel released the first American Flyer exclusive catalog, featuring many all-new models with advanced electronic features and increased scale compatibility.

Lionel also produces lines for children, including battery-powered G scale trains and "Little Lines" sets for children as young as four.

== Lionel gauges and scales history ==
This shows all the scales that Lionel has been associated with for over 100 years total.

Pre-standard gauge: 1900–1906

Standard gauge: 1906–1939, 1986–1990, 1999–2002

O gauge: 1915–1941, 1946–present

OO gauge: 1938–1942

HO gauge: 1957–1967, 1974–1990, 2016–present

G scale: 1987–2002 and 2006–2016

S scale: 1967 (Purchase of A.C. Gilbert American Flyer), 1979–present

- 1959–1963
- 1959–1967
- 1970–1986
- 1986–1995
- 1986–1995
- 1995–2000
- 1995–1999
- 1999–2001
- 2001–2004

== Lionel Collectors Club of America ==
In 1974, the LCCA was created in Des Moines, Iowa, with 83 other charter members. The club mainly focuses on having members show an interest in Lionel trains with train meets, swap meets, and annual conventions. In 2012, the LCCA and the Lionel Railroaders Club (LRRC) merged, with LCCA as the name of the combined group. Before the merger, one membership was needed to receive publications by LCCA and another separate membership was needed to attend the annual conventions in the summer. After the merger, they changed the arrangement so that junior membership and regular membership can get the publications and the invitation to the annual conventions with just one membership instead of two.

- (1988–1989)
- (1990–1991)
- (1998–1999)
- (2002–2003)
- (2004–2005)
