= K-Line =

Model railway locomotive company

K-Line Electric Trains is a brand name of O gauge and S gauge model railway locomotives, rolling stock, and buildings. Formerly the brand name under which Chapel Hill, North Carolina–based MDK Inc. sold its products, K-Line was then acquired by Sanda Kan, a Chinese toy manufacturer that formerly acted as K-Line's subcontractor. Sanda Kan had licensed the use of the K-Line brand and intellectual property to Lionel. More recently, the Lionel license expired, and Sanda Kan sold the dies to several other companies, with some going to each of Atlas, Bachmann, Lionel, and RMT.

== Establishment ==
MDK was founded in 1975 by Maury D. Klein. Like competitor MTH Electric Trains, MDK was a large Lionel dealer, and its mail-order ads appeared in magazines such as Model Railroader in the late 1970s. MDK first used the K-Line name on a line of aftermarket Lionel-compatible tubular track as well as a copy of the A.C. Gilbert American Flyer line of two-rail S-Gauge track which Maury Klein acquired at Gilbert's demise.

Louis Marx and Company's final demise in 1978 led to MDK increasing the K-Line product line. In 1980, MDK purchased the tooling for Marx's Plasticville-like Marxville buildings and accessories for train sets at bankruptcy. K-Line was able to recover additional Marx tooling by scavenging through old factories and warehouses. In an oft-repeated story, Maury Klein and his plant manager, Brent Chambers, found the molds for the Marx model 333 and 1829 4-6-2 locomotives in a dilapidated Fisher-Price warehouse near Buffalo, New York in 1984. The warehouse was unlighted, unheated, and was missing part of its roof.

By 1985, K-Line was producing O27 locomotives, cars, and figures from former Marx and Kusan tooling, and, with minor changes, began marketing them under the K-Line brand, competing with Lionel at the low end of the market. The dies mostly remained unchanged, with only the branding changing—for example, "Marxville" plastic buildings became "K-Lineville". K-Line changed the couplers on the Marx-derived trains to make the cars compatible with Lionel, and, eventually, improved the graphics.

During the 1980s, K-Line filled much the same role that Marx had in the model railroading arena, supplying similar trains at a lower price than Lionel, but with less prestige.

== Rise to power ==
In the 1990s, K-Line was able to purchase more disused tooling from other manufacturers, allowing it to offer full-size O gauge for the first time, which it supplemented with pricier O gauge locomotives and rolling stock of its own design. Shifting its emphasis away from its budget offerings, K-line made some of the very best mass-produced O scale trains with their detailed models that it released in its latter years. In December 1996, about 20,000 model trains were recalled due to a potential fire hazard from the coil spring overheating if the train derails.

Many collectors consider K-Line's 1:48 scale offerings to be not only the best value, but also the very best mass-produced O gauge trains. K-Line's heavyweight passenger cars are among those exhibited at The Brandywine River Museum Railroad's annual "A Brandywine Christmas" celebration in Chadds Ford, PA. Its 21-inch extruded aluminum passenger cars are prized by 3-rail collectors and operators, and are often converted over to 2-rail "scale" operations. Lionel even began selling them for high dollars in 2010, before its license for K-Line products expired.

K-Line's S gauge offerings provided budget-priced cars as well as the already produced track compatible with American Flyer-brand trains. Unlike its latest O scale products, K-Line's marketing on its S gauge cars centered its price advantage over the competition. Most of the S gauge products were also made from old Marx O27 molds, with S gauge trucks replacing the O trucks.

The relationship between Lionel and K-Line had generally been more amicable than Lionel's relationship with MTH, before the 2005 legal debacle with Lionel. Lionel had licensed TMCC to K-Line, and K-Line produced a number of repair manuals for postwar-era Lionel. K-Line has also produced commemorative cars celebrating some of Lionel's significant anniversaries, whose graphics has sometimes caused confusion among collectors.

Because K-Line's budget offerings remained almost unchanged from the old Marx designs, Marx collectors sometimes sourced spare parts from K-Line.

== Demise ==
K-Line and Lionel were known to criticize one another's offerings in print advertisements, and the two companies challenged one another in court as well. The two companies settled the suit on August 10, with K-Line agreeing to withdraw the infringing products by January 31, 2006 and paying a royalty to Lionel in the interim. K-Line also licensed some of its technology to Lionel, and reimbursed $700,000 of legal costs. Shortly thereafter the settlement fell apart and on August 23, 2005, MDK filed for Chapter 11 bankruptcy protection. On October 27, K-Line and Lionel reached a new settlement, including a permanent injunction against manufacturing products containing the disputed technology, a $2 million damage claim in its bankruptcy case, and royalty-free access to several K-Line patents.

K-Line's 2005 bankruptcy petition stated that its annual sales were between $7 and $8 million.

Over the next few months, K-Line's operations slowed and there were numerous layoffs and rumors of potential purchasers, which were highly publicized among hobbyists. On February 16, 2006, Lionel announced it had purchased K-Line. Since Lionel was also in bankruptcy, the deal, which actually involved the purchase of K-Line by Sanda Kan, its Chinese subcontractor, followed by Sanda Kan's licensing of the trademarks and intellectual property to Lionel, took several weeks to become final. The deal was finalized on April 18, 2006, and Lionel made the announcement the following day.

From 2006 through 2010, Lionel continued a limited run of K-Line trains called K-Line by Lionel, and issued separate K-Line by Lionel catalogs until 2010, when those products were folded into a section in Lionel's own catalog.

During the first few years of this K-line by Lionel period, the extravagant passenger trains which competed directly with Lionel's premium products were conspicuously absent, with the initial offerings focusing more on K-Line's value line. Increasing amounts of scale products, including some of the well known 21-inch alumumum passenger cars, were added late in Lionel's license period.

In a twist of fate, Lionel now has possession of the rights to produce American Flyer track, which until now was missing from its American Flyer train line.

More recently, the Lionel license expired, and Sanda Kan sold the dies to several other companies, with some going to each of Atlas, Bachmann, Lionel, and RMT.
