= MTH Electric Trains =

American toy and model train manufacturer

- Type: Private
- Industry: Toys and hobbies
- Founded: Columbia, Maryland (1980)
- Headquarters: Columbia, MD
- Key people: Mike Wolf, founder and owner
- Products: MTH, Lionel Reproductions, Ives, and American Flyer
- Revenue: approx. $30 million (2004) approx. $90 million (peak)
- Number of employees: 16
- Website: www.mthtrains.com

MTH Electric Trains is an American toy train and model railroad designer, importer, and manufacturer. A privately held company based in Columbia, Maryland, MTH is known as Mike's Train House.

== Early career ==
MTH's founder, Mike Wolf, started assembling and selling trains at the age of 12 in 1973 for Williams Electric Trains, which had begun producing reproductions of vintage trains manufactured by Lionel Corporation, in the early 1970s. By 1980, Wolf was operating a mail order business selling Williams trains and parts out of his bedroom in his parents' home.

When Williams decided to end its line of Lionel Standard gauge and O gauge reproductions, Wolf bought the tooling and continued building the replicas. Although many published reports have stated that Williams had acquired original Lionel tooling, both Wolf and Jerry Williams deny this claim.

From 1983 to 1987, MTH marketed the reproduction trains on its own. In 1987, Lionel approached Samhongsa, MTH's subcontractor in South Korea, about manufacturing Standard Gauge trains that bore the Lionel name. Samhongsa directed Lionel to Wolf. Before the end of 1987, MTH became a Lionel subcontractor, allowing MTH's Lionel reproductions to bear the Lionel name and be marketed by Lionel itself. As part of the agreement, MTH sold Lionel trains product as part of its mail order business. By the early 1990s, MTH was the second-largest mail-order Lionel dealer in the country.

MTH had a troubled relationship with Lionel that ended in April 1993 when MTH decided to re-enter the market with an O scale model of the General Electric Dash 8 diesel locomotive, which Wolf had first offered to produce for Lionel. Turned down, Wolf decided to market the locomotive himself, citing reduced orders from Lionel for MTH's replicas as the reason. Then-Lionel CEO Richard Kughn, who learned of the decision from a flyer at a train show, responded by canceling MTH's Lionel dealership. MTH, in turn, filed an anti-trust suit against Lionel, which was settled out of court in 1995. MTH then expanded its product line, adding the former Lionel vintage reproductions, reproductions of equipment from other manufacturers, and new original designs. By 1998, MTH was the largest manufacturer of O gauge trains, eclipsing Lionel's market share by approximately $60 million to $50 million. At its peak, MTH employed about 135 people.

MTH also produced many sets of New York City Subway cars, licensed by the MTA, and two sets of Chicago 'L' cars. Lionel currently holds the MTA license for the NYC Subway cars in O scale while Walthers holds the license in HO scale after acquiring Life-Like. The license transfer is in part due to MTH producing sets covered in graffiti.

MTH and Lionel developed a rivalry similar to that between Lionel and Ives in the 1930s and Lionel and American Flyer in the 1940s and 1950s. Although their train cars are the same size and can operate as part of the same train, the two companies' locomotives use their own proprietary electronic control systems. MTH uses a system called Digital Command System (DCS), which is capable of operating MTH engines as well as engines using Lionel's Trainmaster Command Control (TMCC), used by many other O gauge manufacturers, and Digital Command Control (DCC), which is an open industry standard used by most two-rail scales.

In December 1999, three former employees of Samhongsa rival Korea Brass were convicted of industrial espionage for stealing and using proprietary MTH designs to produce models for Lionel. In April 2000, MTH again sued Lionel, this time for industrial espionage, citing as evidence original electronic drawing files and the precedent set in the South Korean criminal courts. On June 7, 2004, a jury in Detroit, Michigan found Lionel guilty and awarded MTH $40.8 million. The following day, Lionel announced it would appeal the verdict. On December 14, 2006, the judgement was overturned on appeal, citing legal mistakes in the jury trial, and a new trial was ordered.

== Later career ==
MTH has also traded lawsuits with Quantum Sound Industries, whose technology is used to add electronic sound to model locomotives from various manufacturers. MTH's critics also say the company patented some elements of DCC, which was supposed to be an unencumbered open standard.

As of June 2004, MTH has 57 employees and annual sales of about US$ 40 million. News reports from the fall of 2004 estimated MTH's annual sales at closer to $30 million. As a privately held company, MTH does not officially release sales figures. In its 2007 reorganization plan, Lionel estimated MTH's annual revenue at about $30 million and stated that MTH is the second-largest manufacturer of O gauge trains in terms of market share.

Although MTH is disliked by Lionel collectors because its reproductions have lowered the market value of all but the most pristine vintage Lionel equipment and disliked by some other hobbyists because of its aggressive marketing and legal tactics, MTH is widely credited with bringing innovations into a hobby that had changed very little since the 1950s as well as lowering prices.

On December 30, 2005, the Union Pacific Railroad sued MTH for using its logos, along with logos of various fallen flag railroads it had acquired, without a license. UP had previously sued other manufacturers, most notably Lionel and Athearn, for the same reason. At the time of the suit, UP had 104 licensees. The suit requested that MTH stop using the trademarks, pay damages, and send UP-branded inventory to the railroad for destruction.

On November 8, 2006 MTH Electric Trains and Union Pacific Railroad announced that they had amicably settled the trademark infringement case that U.P. filed against MTH in the Omaha, Nebraska federal court. The settlement benefits both parties as well the entire model railroad industry, allows Union Pacific to continue to protect its intellectual property, and authorizes MTH’s use of Union Pacific’s trademarks and paint designs on model train products and accessories. Union Pacific has also decided to change its trademark-licensing program so that model railroad manufacturers will no longer have to pay a royalty and will enjoy a perpetual license to use Union Pacific trademarks and paint designs on model railroad products.

In late 2007, Lionel and MTH settled their long-term fight over trade secrets and patent infringements. In March 2008, the court approved a settlement, which has its details under court seal, that includes a one time cash payment to MTH that will take place soon after Lionel exits bankruptcy.

In 2009, Lionel Electric Trains (Lionel, LLC) and MTH Electric Trains began working together under the Lionel Corporation banner. For three decades, MTH Trains had been making Tinplate Reproductions of trains, but did not have the authentic Lionel and American Flyer graphics on the models and boxes. In 2009, the two joined forces, allowing MTH Trains to produce the Lionel tinplate electric trains with the official graphics. The interior electronics are from MTH Electric Trains, but the exterior bears the Lionel Corporation graphics.

In June 2020, it was announced that the CEO, Mike Wolf, will be retiring. Initially, the company was planning to shut down at the end of May 2021, but since then, the company relocated to 6660 Santa Barbara Road in Elkridge, MD 21075 and continues to produce and market RailKing O Gauge and Premier Line O Scale models with the remaining tooling in its portfolio.

On January 31, 2021, ScaleTrains.com has announced they have acquired MTH's HO and S scale tooling.

The licensing agreement between M.T.H. and Lionel LLC to manufacture tinplate trains with the Lionel logo were terminated in 2019. While an option to continue the relationship was proffered, the renewal terms offered by Lionel for an extension beyond 2019 were not conducive for any future M.T.H. tinplate plans.

- Classic Toy Trains (March 1994). CTT Visits Mike's Train House. Classic Toy Trains, page 106.
- Grossmann, John (February 2005). Train Wreck. Inc., page 84.
- Hollander, Ron (February 2001). Let's call the whole thing off. Classic Toy Trains, page 97.
