= Plasticville =

Brand of plastic toy train building sold in the United States

Plasticville is a brand of plastic toy train building sold in the United States, made by Philadelphia, Pennsylvania-based Bachmann Industries since 1947 (although they were first advertised in 1946). In 1984, Plasticville as well as the entire line was taken over by Kader Industries of Dongguan, China and made entirely in China.

Plasticville buildings are a simple design, made of walls that snap together, permitting them to be assembled without glue and easily disassembled again for storage. Out of the box, Plasticville buildings are usually two-tone, with building walls of one color and the doors, windows and roof molded out of a different colored plastic. With few exceptions, Plasticville buildings are styled after 1950s suburban buildings, and the product line has not changed since the late 1950s.

Most Plasticville buildings are 1:64 scale with 1:48 scale doors, a design compromise that allows them to be used with O gauge, O27 gauge, or S gauge train layouts without looking far off-scale. This allowed one product line to serve Lionel's low-end and high-end product lines as well as American Flyer's product line in the 1950s. Later, as HO scale gained popularity, Bachmann produced a line of 1:87 scale buildings for that standard.

== History ==
The first Plasticville product was a plastic fence, first marketed as a Christmas tree accessory. When Bachmann found out consumers were using its product on train layouts, it also added some other accessories such as trees, bushes, and bridges. By 1950, Bachmann had added houses and stores to the product line, and Plasticville quickly became the most popular brand of train buildings on the U.S. market. Bachmann added several buildings to the product line every year until 1958. Some of these buildings were of Bachmann design, but others came from competing product lines that Bachmann absorbed in the mid-1950s.

In the late 1950s, mass-market interest in trains declined, with other pastimes, such as slot cars, gaining at their expense. Bachmann responded in 1963 by introducing a line of accessories for slot car tracks.

Although not all pieces were manufactured every year, the Plasticville line has remained commercially available since the 1950s.

In 1984, Plasticville as well as the entire line OF Bachmann Industries was taken over by Kader Industries of Dongguan, China and made entirely there in China.

== Collecting ==
The only way to accurately date many Plasticville buildings is by examining their packaging. A Plasticville building has its highest collectible value when accompanied by its original box and in an unglued and unpainted state. Glued Plasticville structures are worth about 20% as much to a collector as an unglued piece, although a Plasticville piece that is nicely glued and painted will have value for use in a train layout, rather than as a collectible.

The plastic used in modern Plasticville has a slightly different texture from vintage Plasticville and although Bachmann uses the same molds today as in the 1950s, it uses different colors in an effort to not diminish the collector value of its old pieces. Re-issues produced after 1997 are marked "Made in China."

Variations in common buildings can drive up the value. The common Plasticville one-story ranch house is worth about $5, but a variation using dark blue plastic is worth about $200.

Many Plasticville collectors join the Plasticville Collectors Association (PCA). The purpose of the association is to promote a sense of fellowship among Plasticville, USA collectors and to serve as an accurate source of information regarding all aspects of Plasticville collecting for its members and the general public.

With declining values, collectors are becoming somewhat scarce since it was taken over by Kader Industries in 1984.
