= Athearn =

American model railroad company

Athearn Trains
- Company type: Private
- Industry: Toys and hobbies
- Founded: 1946; 80 years ago
- Founder: Irvin Athearn
- Headquarters: Champaign, Illinois, United States
- Products: Model trains and accessories
- Parent: Horizon Hobby, Inc.
- Website: www.athearn.com

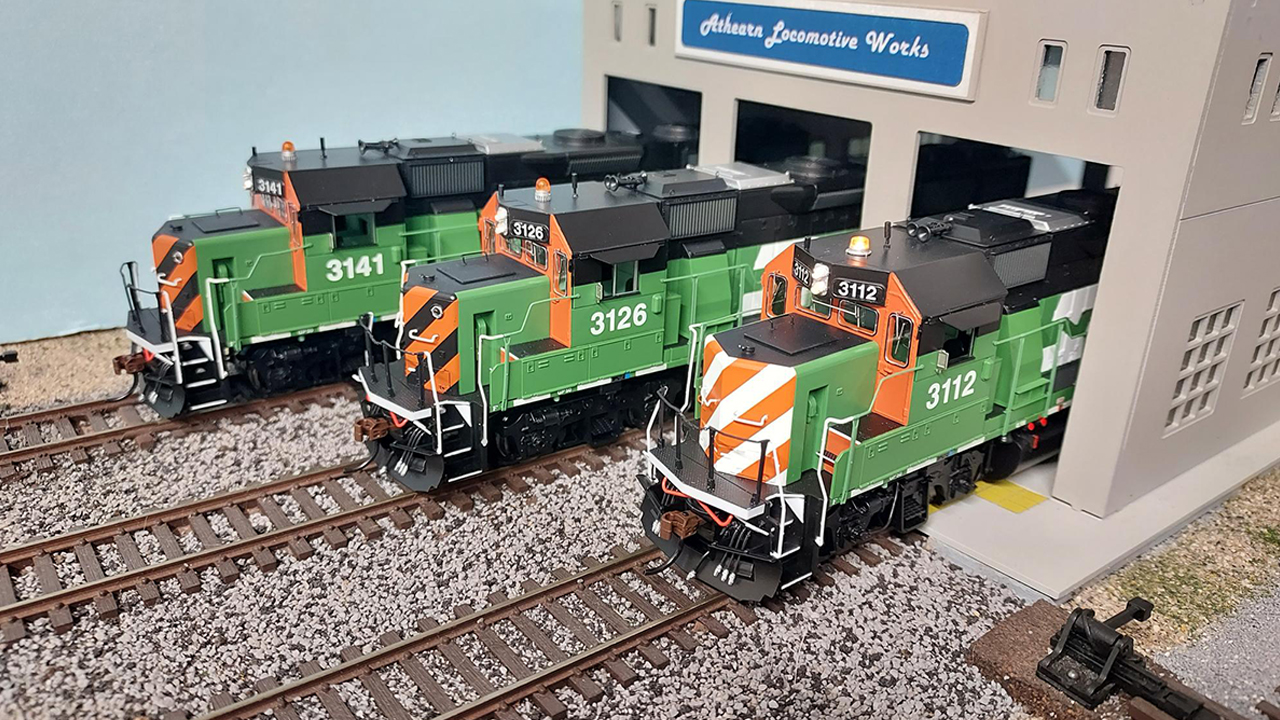
A trio of Athearn Genesis GP50s produced in 2024

Athearn is a United States manufacturer of model railroad equipment, produced and distributed by American hobby manufacturer Horizon Hobby, Inc. of Champaign, Illinois.

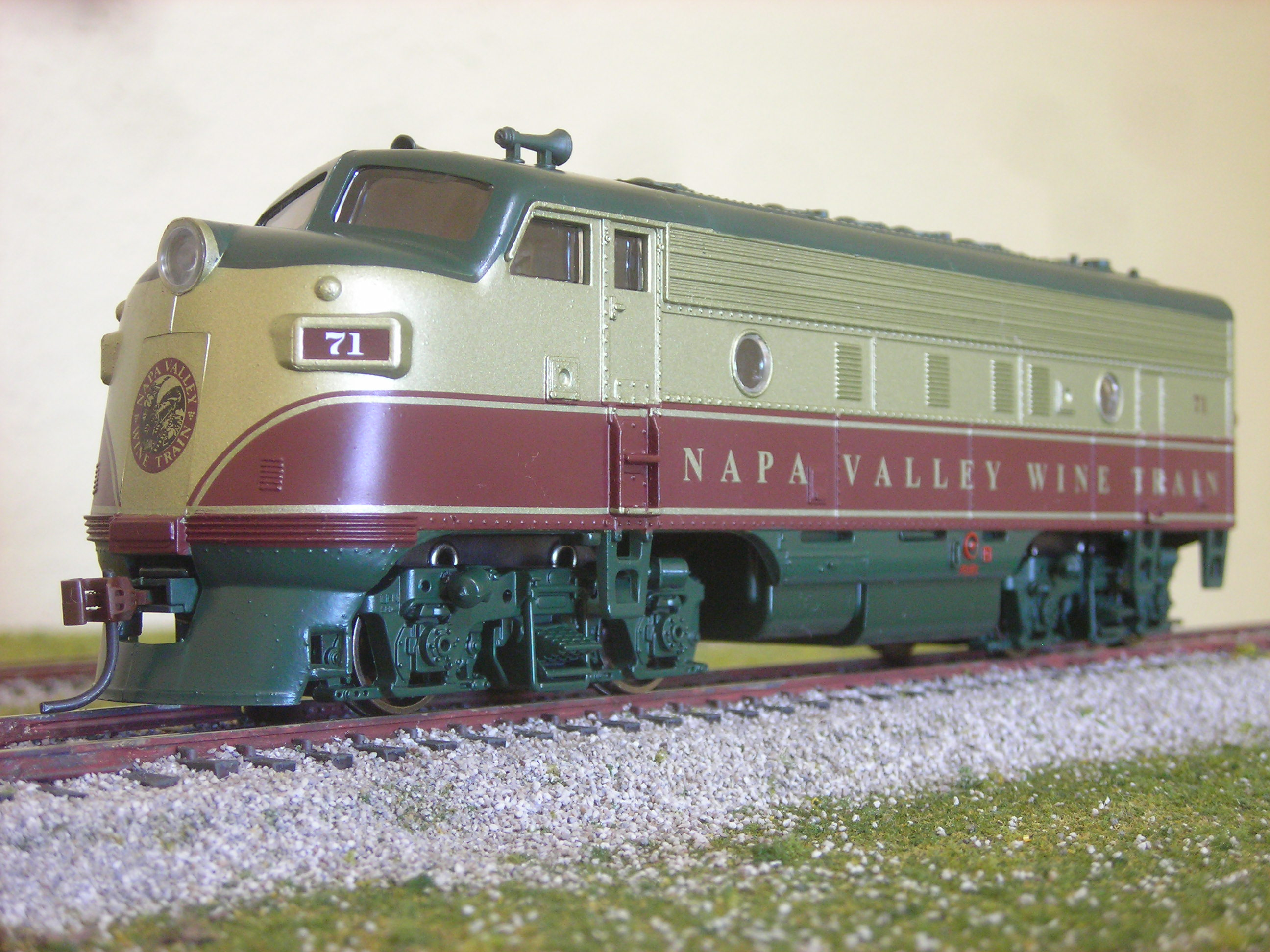
Athearn Ready to Run F7A Painted for Napa Valley Wine Train

== History ==
In 1938 Irvin Athearn built a detailed O scale model railroad layout in his mother's house, which gained an overwhelming response when he placed an advertisement to sell it. Deciding to make his career selling model railroad supplies, he became a full-time retailer in 1946. Athearn opened a separate facility in Hawthorne, California, in 1948, and that same year he branched into HO scale models for the first time.

Athearn acquired the Globe Models product line in 1951 and improved upon it, introducing a comprehensive array of locomotive, passenger, and freight car models. Improvements included all-wheel drive and electrical contact. One innovation was the "Hi-F" drive mechanism, employing small rubber bands to transfer motion from the motor spindle to the axles. Another was the double-ended ring magnet motor, which permitted easy connection to all-wheel-drive assemblies. Athearn was also able to incorporate flywheels into double-ended drives.

=== Blue Box Era ===
Starting in the mid-1950s, Athearn produced shortened versions of streamlined and heavyweight passenger cars based on Southern Pacific and Atchison, Topeka and Santa Fe prototypes. The company also offered a variety of freight cars with sprung and equalized trucks. The cars could be obtained in simple kit form, or ready-to-run. A model of the Budd Rail Diesel Car was introduced in 1953 with a metal body, and reintroduced in 1958 in plastic. The comprehensive scope of the product line contributed to the popularity of HO as a model railroad scale, due to the ready availability of items and their low cost.

=== Lionel, Cox, and Atlas OEM ===
When Lionel Corporation introduced their line of HO scale trains in 1958, many of the trains were produced by Athearn. Athearn also produced trains for the short-lived Cox Models brand of electric train sets in the 1970s. Many of these products were pre-existing items from the Athearn catalog repackaged with Cox branding. Freight cars packaged with train sets sold by Atlas Model Railroad Co. in the 1970s also came from Athearn.

The company produced a model of the Boston & Maine P4 class Pacific steam locomotive which incorporated a cast zinc alloy base and thermoplastic resin superstructure. It had a worm drive and all power pickup was through the bipolar trucks that carried the tender. This item was discontinued after the Wilson motor was no longer available, and was not redesigned for a more technologically advanced motor.

Irvin Athearn died in 1991. New owners took control in 1994, but continued to follow Athearn's business model. Paul Lubliner's fine quality tooling for his "Highliners" brand of EMD F-units was acquired by Athearn in 1998 and integrated into their new Genesis line. In 2002, Athearn acquired Rail Power Products, as well as the tooling for modern 50' boxcars from Details West.

=== Horizon Hobby acquisition ===
Athearn was purchased in 2004 by Horizon Hobby, which moved the company from Compton to a new facility in Carson, California. At the same time, Horizon purchased Model Die Casting and their line of Roundhouse brand trains. A major international hobby distributor, Horizon Hobby is headquartered in Champaign, Illinois.

In 2006, Horizon purchased McHenry Couplers and in 2007 acquired the tooling for several trailers from A-Line, which were released in the Ready To Roll product line In 2008, Athearn acquired the tooling for the short-lived "Tower 55" series of HO scale diesels from Overland Models. Much of this tooling made its way into the Athearn Genesis line.

In mid-2009, all remaining U.S. production was moved to China and warehousing moved to parent Horizon Hobby. Sales and product development was moved to a smaller facility in Long Beach, California.

On October 16, 2009, Athearn announced that it would stop making blue-box kits, citing increased manufacturing and labor costs.

In May 2021, the decision was made to close down the Long Beach office as Development was then performed remotely. By June 2021, all service and spare parts for Athearn products had been shipped to the Horizon main complex in Champaign, Illinois, with repairs and warranty work all being performed there by July 2021. The development team, sales and marketing continues to work remotely with all replacement parts and repair requests are handled on site in Champaign.
