= Atlas Model Railroad =

Manufacturer of scale models

Coordinates: 40.7020°N 74.2335°W

Atlas Model Railroad Co.
- Company type: Private
- Industry: Hobbies
- Founded: 1924
- Founder: Stephan Schaffan, Sr.
- Headquarters: Hillside, New Jersey, United States
- Products: Model trains and accessories
- Website: https://shop.atlasrr.com/

Atlas Model Railroad Company, Inc. makes scale models in N scale, HO scale, and O scale. The company is based in Hillside, New Jersey, United States. They produce a wide variety of locomotives, rolling stock, and vehicles. Atlas is well known for their Flex Track (scale model railroad track that is able to bend to several angles) and codes 55, 80, 83 and 100 track (track codes describe the height of the track by thousands of an inch, for example code 55 is 0.055 inches tall). Atlas also produces a line of compatible structures and bridges.

== History ==
Stephan Schaffan, Sr., an immigrant of Czechoslovakia founded the Atlas Tool Company in the garage of his home in Newark, New Jersey, in 1924. In 1933 his son, Stephan Schaffan, Jr., came to work for his father at the age of sixteen. Steve Jr. built model airplanes and frequented a local hobby shop. He would often ask the owner if there was anything he could do to earn some extra spending money. Not taking his inquiries seriously, the store owner challenged Schaffan to come up with better track components using the materials available in the shop. In those days, railroad modelers had to assemble and build everything from scratch. Steve Jr. created a "switch kit" which sold so well, that the entire family worked on them in the basement at night, while doing business as usual in the machine shop during the day.

Subsequently, Steve Jr. engineered the stapling of rail to fiber track, along with inventing the first practical rail joiner and pre-assembled turnouts and flexible track. All of these products, and more, helped to popularize model railroading and assisted in the creation of a mass-market hobby. The growing company quickly outgrew the garage and basement of the family home. Realizing they could actually make a living selling track and related products, the first factory was built in nearby Hillside, New Jersey, at 413 Florence Avenue in 1947. On September 30, 1949, the Atlas Tool Company was incorporated.

=== Expanding into Rolling Stock ===
Atlas’ days as a track and plastic building kit manufacturer began shifting in 1968, when Atlas delved into the N scale locomotives market, starting with USRA Pacifics in 1968 and USRA light and heavy Mikados in 1969, all made by Rivarossi in Italy.

In 1970, Atlas ventured more deeply into the growing N scale market with two locomotives made for the company by Rivarossi: the Baltimore & Ohio C-16 0-4-0T saddletank switcher commonly known as the Docksider or Little Joe and its converted cousin, the C-16a 0-4-0 with coal tender. Those offerings were followed by EMD diesels, the F9, GP9 and GP30, made by Roco in Austria, in 1973 and 1974.

Atlas would continue its N scale line with a wide range of freight cars, made at their Hillside factory, in the 1970s and 1980s.

Also, beginning in 1971, Atlas began importing a line of O scale locomotives and rolling stock produced by Roco in Austria. New items were not advertised after 1973, though some pieces remained catalogued through the 1980s.

Atlas entered the market for ready-to-run HO scale diesel locomotives in 1975, importing models produced in Austria by Roco. Six models of various EMD diesels made up the base of this initial offering through the 1980s. Complete train sets were first offered by Atlas in the 1970s, using the Roco-produced diesels and freight cars supplied by Athearn. Atlas later forged a partnership with Japanese manufacturer Kato Precision Railroad Models to release an Alco RS-3 in N scale in 1983 that raised standards in the hobby for fine scale fidelity.

Stephan Schaffan, Jr. died in 1983. In 1985, he was honored posthumously for his inventions by the Model Railroad Industry Association (now known as the Hobby Manufacturers Association) and was inducted into the Industry Hall of Fame in Baltimore, Maryland. He was also nominated and entered into the National Model Railroad Association Pioneers of Model Railroading in 1995.

=== Atlas Model Railroad Co. Era ===
In the early 1990s, the Atlas Tool Co. changed its name to Atlas Model Railroad Company, Inc.

In 1997 Atlas O, LLC was established as a separate business entity dedicated to producing multiple lines of O scale model railroad products including track, freight cars, locomotives and accessories, co-founded and led by James J. Weaver. After spending many years developing a number of products across many price points, including a successful line of O scale sectional track, Weaver died in 2011. Atlas O, LLC became a wholly owned subsidiary and was merged into Atlas Model Railroad Co. Inc. effective January 1, 2012.

Expanding their O scale product line, Atlas purchased certain assets of Industrial Rail from Hobbico in 2006. In 2011, Atlas purchased the tooling and inventory of Branchline Trains, including their line of HO scale "Blueprint Series" and "Yardmaster" freight cars and passenger cars.

In 2021, Atlas acquired some of the O scale tooling from MTH Trains. They also acquired some River Point Station tooling for N scale vehicles in 2021.

Stephan Schaffan's daughter Diane and her husband Tom Haedrich continued to lead Atlas until 2013. Paul Graf was named chief executive officer, while Jarrett Schaffan Haedrich, great-grandson of Atlas founder Stephan J. Schaffan Sr., was promoted from vice president of marketing to chief operating officer.

== Product Lines ==
Atlas offers the following tiers of their products

- Master: The highest quality and price
- Premier: Former MTH molds with more detail, and more expensive
- Classic: Older molds with less detail, but more affordable
- Trainman: Newer molds with less detail at lower prices
