= 1:48 scale =

Scale for models and miniatures

1:48 scale is a scale commonly used in diecast models, plastic models made from kits, and construction toys. It is especially popular with manufacturers of model aircraft and model trains, where it is known as "O scale". 1:48 is also a popular scale among Lego enthusiasts, since it is approximately the scale of the Lego minifigure relative to a six-foot tall human.

At this scale, 1/4 inch represents 1 foot. It is similar in size to 1:50 scale and 1:43 scale, which are popular for diecast vehicles.

In 2003, Tamiya began to manufacture a line of military ground vehicle models in 1:48 in addition to their more traditional 1:35 scale line.

Bandai also produces giant robots in this size, called Mega Size.

== See also ==
- Die-cast toy
- Rail transport modelling scales
- Scale model
