= O scale =

Model railroad gauge

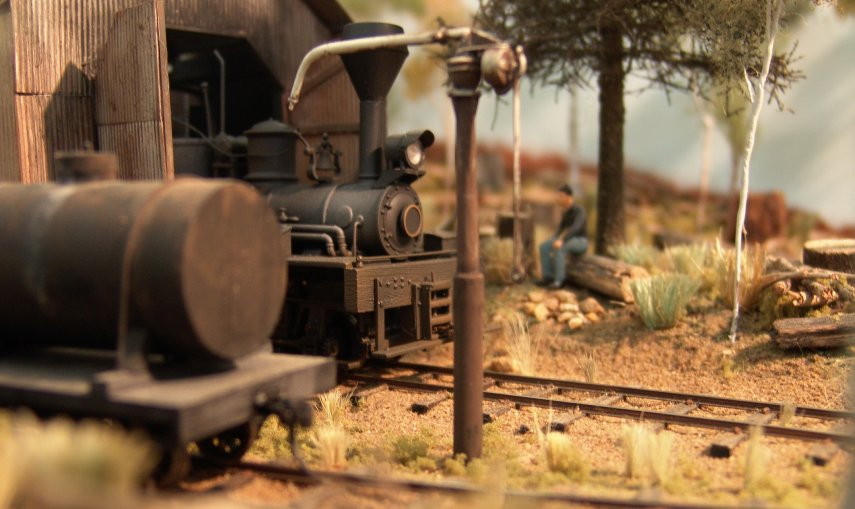
- Australian O scale model railway
- Scale: British: 7 mm to 1 ft (7 mm to 304.8 mm, 1:43.5); Continental Europe: 1:43.5 and 1:45; American: ^{1}/_{4} in to 1 ft (6.35 mm to 304.8 mm, 1:48)
- Model gauge: 32 mm (1.26 in)
- Prototype gauge: 1,435 mm (4 ft 8 1/2 in) standard gauge

O scale (or O gauge) is a scale commonly used for toy trains and rail transport modelling. Introduced by German toy manufacturer Märklin around 1900, by the 1930s three-rail alternating current O gauge was the most common model railroad scale in the United States and remained so until the early 1960s. In Europe, its popularity declined before World War II due to the introduction of smaller scales.

O gauge had its heyday when model railroads were considered toys, with more emphasis placed on cost, durability, and the ability to be easily handled and operated by pre-adult hands. Detail and realism were secondary concerns, at best. It still remains a popular choice for those hobbyists who enjoy running trains more than they enjoy other aspects of modeling, but developments in recent years have addressed the concerns of scale model railroaders making O scale popular among fine-scale modellers who value the detail that can be achieved.

The size of O is larger than OO/HO layouts, and thus is a factor in making the decision to build an O gauge layout.

Collecting vintage O gauge trains is also popular and there is a market for both reproduction and vintage models.

== History ==
The name for O gauge and O scale is derived from "0 [zero] gauge" or "Gauge 0" being smaller than Gauge 1 and the other then-existing standards. It was created in part because manufacturers realized their best selling trains were those built in the smaller scales.

In the United States, manufacturers such as the Ives Manufacturing Company, American Flyer, and Lionel Corporation used O gauge for their budget line, marketing either Gauge 1 or 'Wide gauge' (also known as 'standard gauge') as their premium trains. One of the Lionel Corporation's most popular trains, the 203 Armoured Locomotive, was O gauge and ran on tracks with rails spaced 1.25 inches apart. The Great Depression wiped out demand for the expensive larger trains, and by 1932, O gauge was the standard, almost by default.

Because of the emphasis on play value, the scale of pre–World War II O gauge trains varied. The Märklin specifications called for 1:43.5 scale. However, many designs were 1:48 scale or 1:64 scale. Early Marx Trains and entry-level trains, usually made of lithographed tin plate, were not scaled at all, made to whimsical proportions about the same length of an HO scale ("half O") piece, but about the same width and height of an O scale piece. Yet all of these designs ran on the same track, and, depending on the manufacturer(s) of the cars, could sometimes be coupled together and run as part of the same train.

After World War II, manufacturers started paying more attention to scale, and post-war locomotives and rolling stock tended to be larger and more realistic than their earlier counterparts. This has been reflected in the change of name from O gauge to O scale: gauge describes merely the distance between the rails, while scale describes the size ratio of a model as it relates to its real-world prototype.

Since the early 1990s, O scale manufacturers have begun placing more emphasis on realism, and the scale has experienced a resurgence in popularity, with manufacturers including Lionel, MTH, Atlas, and Williams by Bachmann making O gauge model trains at 1:48 scale.

In the United Kingdom the dominant O gauge manufacturer before World War II was Meccano Ltd. who from 1920 produced a range of clockwork and electric models under the "Hornby" name.

== Standards ==
The differences in the various O gauge and O scale standards can be confusing. O gauge model railroad tracks typically have their rails spaced 1.25 in (31.75 mm) apart with the United States National Model Railroad Association (NMRA) standard allowing spacings between 31.75 mm and 32.64 mm.

=== Scale and gauge ===
Scale refers to the size of the model relative to the actual full-sized object being represented, while gauge is the width of the model track. Most commercially produced model track is a compromise between appearance and a trouble-free running surface.

==== Scale ====
Scale is the ratio of a model dimension to the real life dimension. O Scale in the UK is commonly 1:43.5 or 7 mm to the foot. In continental Europe it is commonly 1:45. 1:43.5 is also used, particularly in France. In the USA, 1:48 is common. The NMRA and the MOROP maintain detailed standards for a variety of scales to help model makers create interoperable models.

==== Gauge ====
Gauge refers to the distance between the inside edges of the load-bearing rails. Various sizes of track gauge exist around the world and the normal O gauge track represents the Standard gauge of 1,435 mm (4 ft 8 1/2 in). "O gauge" refers to tracks that are nominal 32 mm (1.26 in) according to older standards of NMRA, current standards of BRMSB and NEM. 1.25 in (31.75 mm) apart current standards of NMRA. When used as a narrow-gauge track, O gauge allows scales such as 1:32 representing 1,000 mm (3 ft 3 3/8 in) gauge track. 1:20 representing 600 mm (1 ft 11 5/8 in) narrow-gauge railways.

Regional model manufacturers design their O-scale rolling stock with minor regional scale differences—manufacturers support their rolling stock with track made to the same regional scales, so there is no universal width for O-gauge model track. Models could represent the real-world standard gauge track spacing of 1,435 mm by choosing various spacings such as 30 mm (1.181 in) at 1:48 scale, 1.25 in (31.75 mm) at 1:45.2 scale, 32 mm (1.26 in) at 1:44.8 scale, 32.96 mm (1.298 in) at 7 mm:1 ft scale, and 33 mm (1.3 in) at 1:43.5 scale. Model makers choose their scale based on many considerations including the existing marketplace, aesthetic concerns and compatibility with existing models.

==== Wide- or narrow-gauge track ====
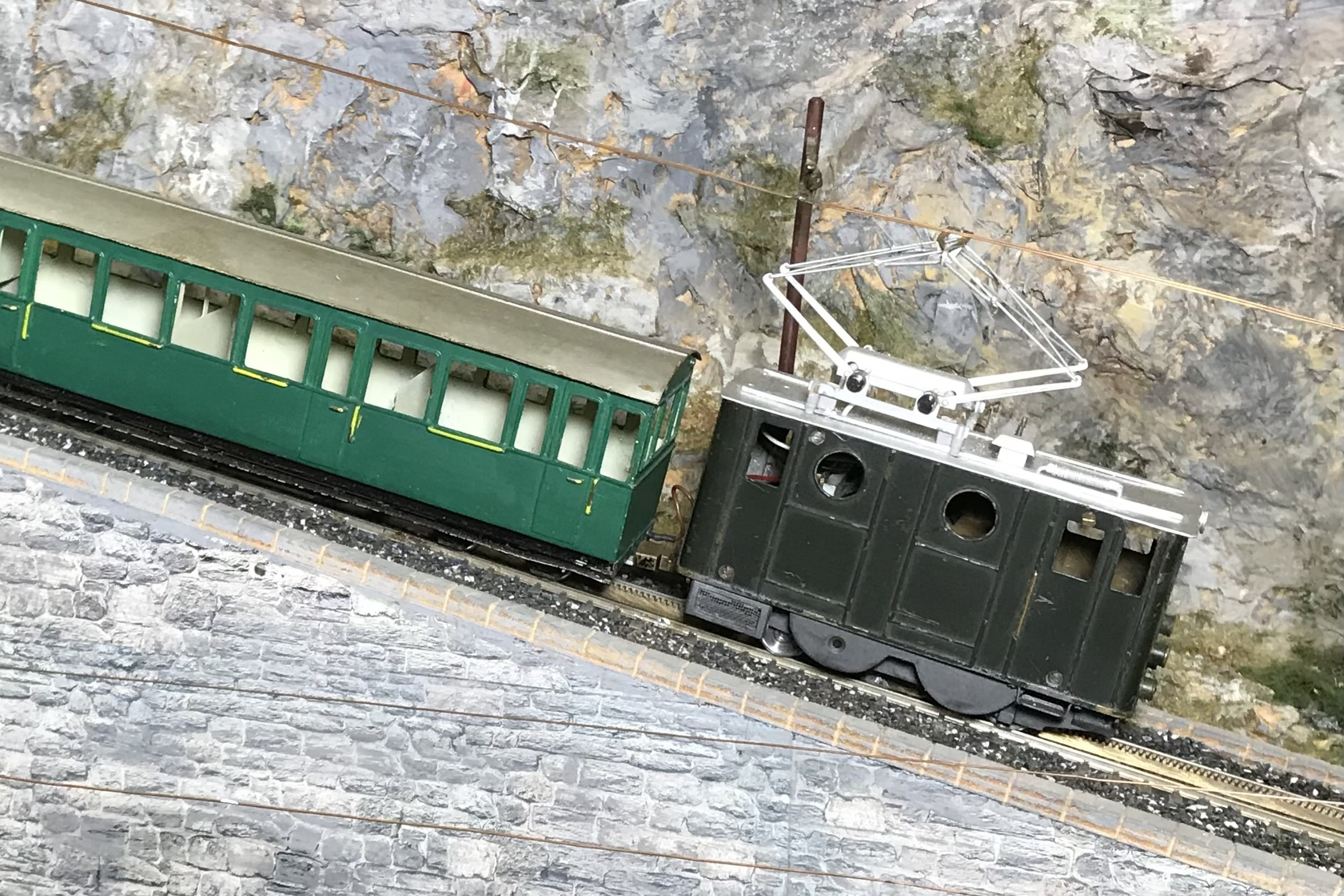
Probably the oldest known 0e gauge vehicles in the Basel Model Train Club (MCB) from 1947. Wengeralp Railway (WAB) rack railway train, 2021

Some O-scale modelers choose to model prototypes at other than standard gauge and follow wide gauge (also known as broad-gauge) or narrow-gauge railroads. There is no standard for wide- or narrow-gauge model track, and modelers wishing to portray such railway track either build their own, or more commonly accept the shortcomings of appropriately wider or narrower gauge model track. 16.5 mm (0.65 in), 12 mm (0.472 in) and 9 mm (0.354 in) are the more popular track widths used by indoor enthusiasts modeling narrow gauge. Differences in regional scales give different prototype gauges to these different model track widths.

For example, a 16.5 mm (0.65 in) gauge track intended by the manufacturer to be scaled at 7 mm to the foot might also be used for the following other scales, in each case accordingly varying the size and spacing of the sleepers (ties) etc.) below and extending outward from it:

1. When used to represent UK O scale rolling stock (1:43.5), it corresponds to a 2 ft 4 in (711 mm) narrow-gauge track and is referred to as "O 16.5," with modelers also using it to represent prototype gauges between 2 ft (610 mm) and 3 ft (914 mm) with varying levels of accuracy.
2. When used to represent European O scale rolling stock (1:45 outside France and 1:43.5 within France), it corresponds to a narrow-gauge track 750 mm (2 ft 5 1/2 in) wide and is referred to as "Oe," with modelers also using it to represent prototype gauges between 650 mm and 800 mm with varying degrees of accuracy.
3. When used to represent United States O scale rolling stock (1:48), it becomes a narrow-gauge track of 2 ft 6 in (762 mm) and is referred to as "On 2½" (or On30, as in 30 inches).

=== Om gauge ===
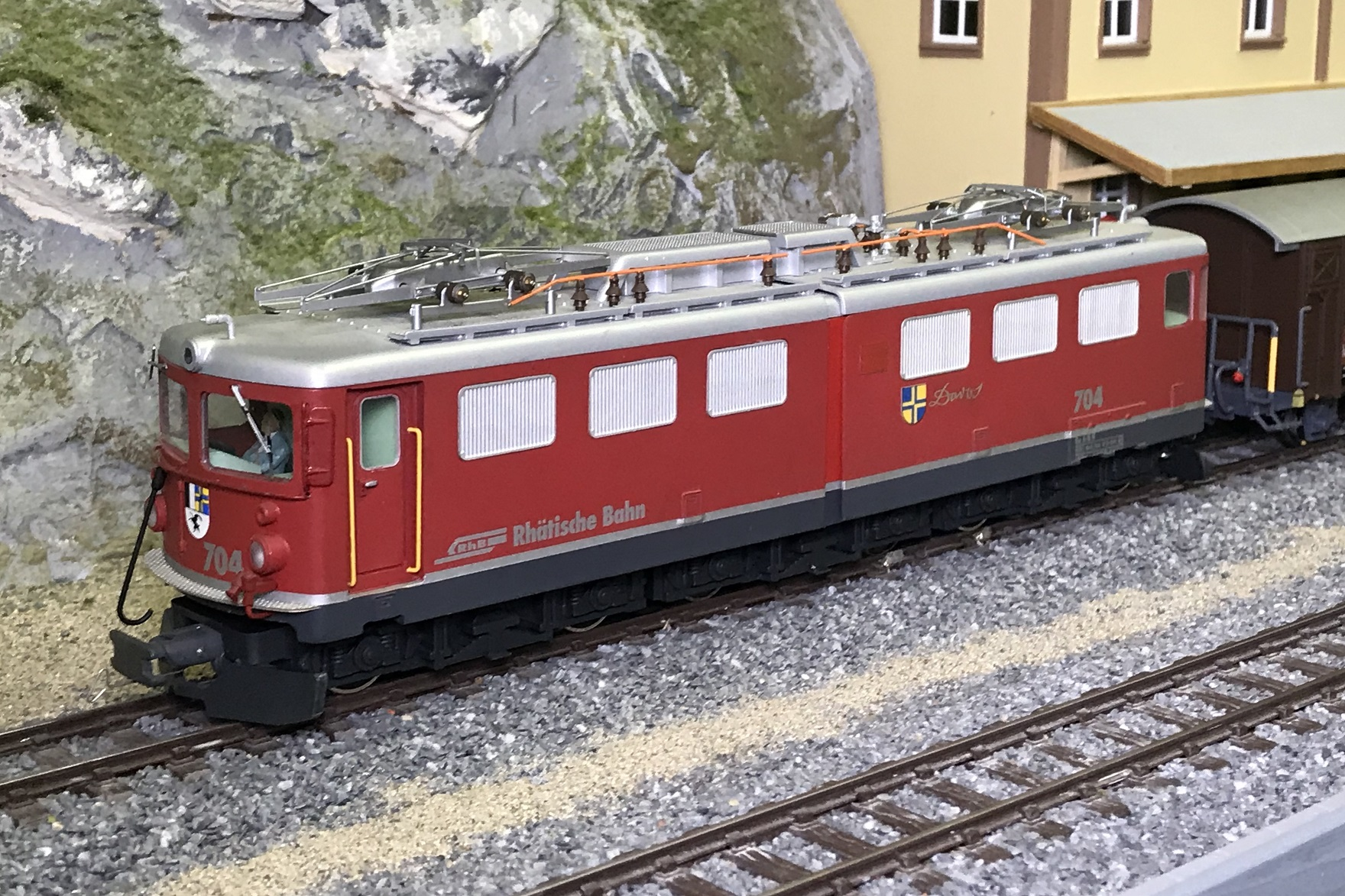
Om gauge (O-22.5 gauge), model of the RhB Ge 6/6 II 704 in 1:45 scale from parts of the former FAMA-Alpenbahn and Lang Modellbau, 2019

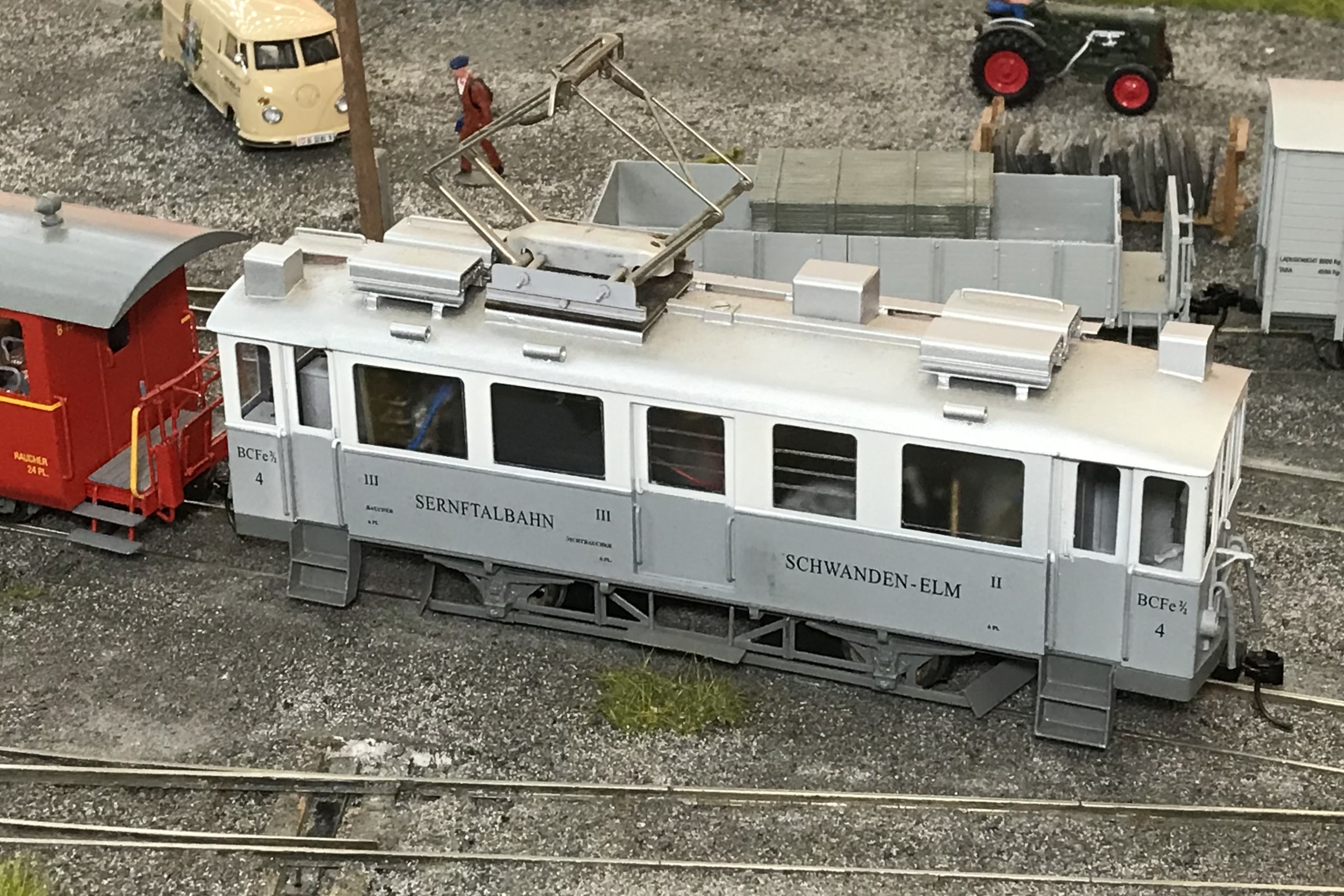
Om gauge (O-22.2 gauge), Diorama based on the SeTB with a selfmade motor coach of the type BCFe 2/2 4, 2021

The Om gauge (O-22.5 gauge) includes the actual narrow-gauges from 850 to 1250 mm and with it the metric gauge. This applies to both 1:43.4 and 1:45 scale model trains. Metric model railroaders generally use the 0m scale with a gauge of 22.5 mm. The starting point is the NEM standards concerning 0m gauge that were created at the end of the 1950s.

=== O-27 gauge ===
O-27 gauge is variant whose origins are slightly unclear. Some historians attribute its creation to A. C. Gilbert Company's American Flyer, but Ives Manufacturing Company used O-27 track in its entry-level sets at least a decade before Gilbert bought Flyer.

The modern standard for O-27, however, was formalized after 1938 by Gilbert, who scaled the locomotives and rolling stock to 1:64 scale. After World War II, this practice was continued by Louis Marx and Company, who used it throughout its product line, and Lionel, who used it for its entry-level trains. O-27 track is spaced at the same width as regular O gauge track, but is slightly shorter in height and has thinner rails than traditional O gauge track. A shim underneath the O-27 track enables the use of O and O-27 track together.

The O-27 name comes from the size of the track's curves. A circle made of eight pieces of standard 45-degree curved O gauge track will have a 31 inches (787 mm) diameter. A circle made of 8 pieces of 45-degree curved O-27 track is smaller, with a 27 inches (686 mm) diameter. Full-sized O cars sometimes have difficulty negotiating the tighter curves of an O-27 layout.

Although the smaller, tin lithographed cars by American Flyer, Marx, and others predate the formal O-27 standard, they are also often called O-27, because they also operate flawlessly on O-27 track. Marx may have dedicated its entire line to O-27, but only the Lionel Corporation remains to produce O-27 track and trains. Its tubular rail is a standard of the tinplate era.

=== Super-O gauge ===
"Super-O gauge" is a variant whose origin stems from Lionel's desire to create a more realistic looking track and improve sagging sales in the late 1950s.

=== Exact scale standards ===
Dissatisfaction with these standards led to a more accurate standard for wheels and track called Proto:48 This duplicates to exact scale the AAR track and wheel standards. In the United Kingdom a similar ScaleSeven system exists.

The track gauge normally used for O of 32 mm or the near-approximation 1 1/4 inch is for Standard gauge (1,435 mm (4 ft 8 1/2 in)) approximately equivalent to 5 ft (1,524 mm) at 1:48 scale, 4 ft 8 1/2 in (1,435 mm) at 1:45 and 4 ft 6 1/2 in (1,384 mm) at 1:43.5.

Possibly because of the large size of American railroad systems, accurate scale modeling in standard gauge O gauge is rare in the United States, though narrow-gauge modeling is much more common.

Four common narrow-gauge standards exist, and the differences among On3, On2, On30, and On18 are frequent sources of confusion. On3 is exact-scale 1:48 modeling of 3 ft (914 mm) gauge prototypes, while On30 is 1:48 modeling of 2 ft 6 in (762 mm) gauge prototypes, On2 is 1:48 modeling of 2 ft (610 mm) gauge prototypes, and On18 is 1:48 modeling of 18 in (457 mm) gauge prototypes. On30 is also sometimes called On2½.

Because On30's gauge closely matches that of HO track, On30 equipment typically runs on standard HO scale track. While many On30 modelers scratchbuild their equipment, commercial offerings in On30 are fairly common and sometimes very inexpensive, with Bachmann Industries being the most commonly found manufacturer.

Hobbyists who choose to model in any of these O gauge standards nevertheless end up building most, if not all, of their equipment either from kits or from scratch.

=== Power supply ===
Models that are either built to 1:43 scale, 7 mm:1 foot (1:43.5), 1:45 scale, or 1:48 scale can run on realistic-looking two-rail track using direct current (Commonly known as 2-Rail O), or on a center third power rail or a center stud supply system. If modeling such a system, an external third rail or overhead supply may be employed.

While two-rail O has traditionally been more popular in Europe, and alternating current powered three-rail more popular in the United States, two-rail O is currently experiencing a resurgence in popularity in the United States, due to increased availability of ready-to-run models from several manufacturers. The recent development of Digital Command Control (DCC) power systems with built in sound have also increased the popularity of two rail O scale models.

=== Die-cast metal models compatible with O scale ===
Many manufacturers produce die-cast models of trucks, cars, buses, construction equipment and other vehicles in scales compatible with or similar to O scale model trains. These are available in 1:43 scale, 1:48 scale and 1:50 scale. Manufacturers include Conrad, NZG, Corgi, TWH Collectibles. Ertl, and many others. These are popular with collectors and easy to find.

== Geographical area ==
A 242A1 locomotive and standard gauge track at some model railway scales

=== Continental Europe ===
0 scale is one of the scales defined by the NEM as 1:43.5 and 1:45 scale. However, for historical reasons they use the number "zero" rather than the letter as the name for the scale.

A situation similar to that in Britain exists in continental Europe, although the market revolves less around kits and more around expensive hand-built metal models for the deep-pocketed collector. Additionally, Czech Republic–based Electric Train Systems started manufacturing and selling lithographed tin 1:45 scale trains in 1991, citing O gauge's advantages over smaller sizes for non-permanent floor layouts and outdoor layouts. The Spanish company Paya produces a smaller line of tinplate trains, based on designs dating back to 1906.

In Germany a narrow-gauge train set is produced by Fleischmann, running on 16.5 mm (0.65 in) track, this scale is called "0e" (750 mm (2 ft 5 1/2 in) prototype). The trains are marketed as children's toy trains (Magic Train), but are accurately built after Austrian prototypes and increased the interest in building narrow-gauge layouts in Germany and Austria significantly. Since 2006 there are again some reasonably priced O-scale plastic models available, manufactured by DCC developer Lenz.

In the 1970s both Italian branches of Rivarossi and Lima produced large quantities of "0" models, mainly Italian and German trains, later on coaches and wagons from Switzerland. In the late 1970s hand made models of the Orient Express could be found in several German hobby stores, along with other highly detailed accessories. Special brands for high procession were Lemaco, Fulgurex, Euro Train, Markscheffel & Lennartz, making models in small quantities.

=== Former Soviet Union ===
Between 1951 and 1969, a limited number of O gauge train sets were manufactured in the Soviet Union. Utilizing the same track and voltage as their U.S. counterparts, the colorful locomotives and cars resembled pre-World War II designs from U.S. manufacturers Lionel and American Flyer and the couplers were nearly identical to those of pre-war American Flyer. Some differences in U.S. and Soviet railroading were evident from comparing the Soviet sets with U.S. sets, particularly in the design of the boxcar, which looked like an American Flyer boxcar with windows added, reflecting the Soviets' use of box cars to haul livestock, as well as merchandise.

Much like their U.S. counterparts, Soviet O gauge trains were toys, rather than precision-scaled models.

=== United Kingdom ===
British O gauge
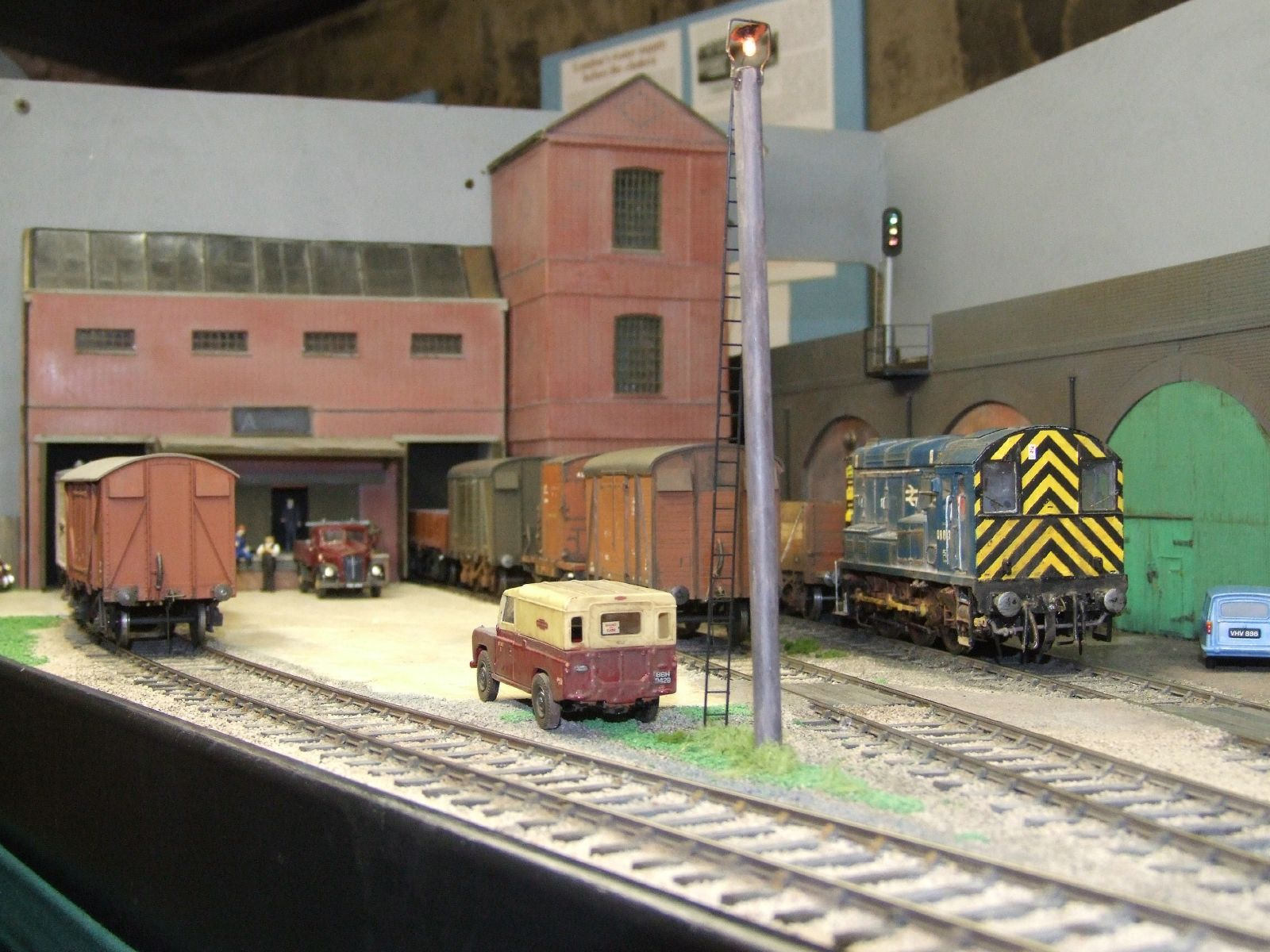
- British outline O gauge model railway at Kew Pumping Station
- Scale: 7 mm to 1 ft (304.8 mm)
- Scale ratio: 1:43.5
- Model gauge: 32 mm
- Prototype gauge: Standard gauge

In the United Kingdom, O gauge equipment is produced at a scale of 1:43.5, which is 7 mm to the foot (using the common British practice of modelling in metric prototypes originally produced using Imperial measurements). It is often called 7 mm scale for this reason.

Although toy trains were historically produced to this scale, O gauge's popularity across the whole of Europe reduced after World War II, and the standard is rarer than in the United States. Modelling in O gauge almost died out in Britain but enjoyed a resurgence in the 1990s as modellers developed a new appreciation for the level of accurate detailing possible in this scale. Some ready to run models are produced in this scale but most are available only as kits for assembly by the modeller or a professional model-builder. O gauge is considered an expensive scale to model in although the necessarily smaller scope of a larger-scaled layout mitigates this to some extent. The two dominant British manufacturers, Bassett-Lowke and Hornby, ceased production of O gauge trains in 1965 and 1969, respectively. However, ACE Trains and for a while a revived Bassett-Lowke are once again producing tinplate O gauge sets, many of them reproductions of classic Hornby and Bassett-Lowke designs, and Heljan also recently joined the market producing O gauge Diesel locomotives.

A true-to-prototype version of British 7 mm O gauge exists, called ScaleSeven (S7) which uses 33 mm gauge to represent British standard gauge in a scale of 1:43.5.

The British 1:43.5 rail scale gave birth to series of die cast cars and model commercial vehicles of the same scale which gradually grew in popularity and spread to France, the rest of Europe and North America at the same time that the rail models were becoming less popular.

7 mm scale is also popular for modelling narrow-gauge railways, a section of the hobby supported by the 7mm Narrow Gauge Association.

=== United States ===
US O gauge
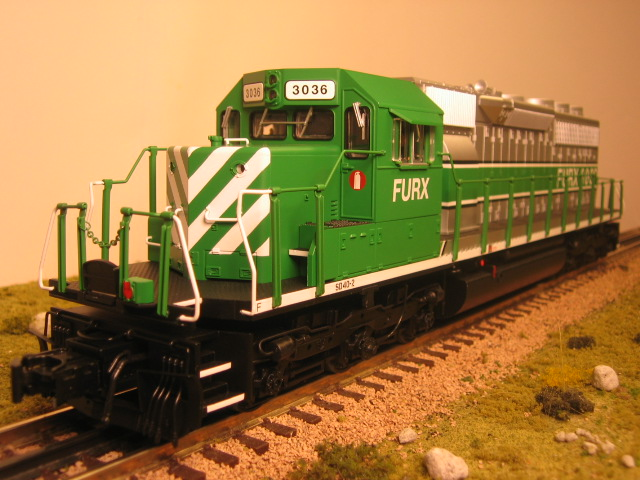
- Typical US O-Scale locomotive
- Scale: 1/4 in (6.35 mm) to 1 ft (304.8 mm)
- Scale ratio: 1:48
- Standard(s): NMRA
- Model gauge: 32 mm
- Prototype gauge: Standard gauge

In the United States, O gauge is defined as 1:48 (0.25 inches to the foot, "quarter inch scale" - 1/4 inch equals one foot). This is also a common dollhouse scale, giving more options for buildings, figures, and accessories. Many O gauge layouts are also accessorized with 1:43.5 scale model cars.

While 1:48 is a very convenient scale for modeling using the Imperial system (a quarter-inch equals one scale foot), the discrepancy between O gauge in the United States and O gauge in Europe is attributed to Lionel misreading the original Märklin specifications.

Although Lionel is the most enduring brand of O gauge trains, a variety of manufacturers made trains in this scale. Prior to World War I, the majority of toy trains sold in the United States were German imports made by Märklin, Bing, Fandor, and other companies. World War I brought a halt to these German imports, and protective tariffs after the war made it difficult for them to compete.

In between the two world wars, shorter-lived companies such as Dorfan, Hafner, Ives, and Joy Line competed with Lionel, Louis Marx and Company, American Flyer and Hornby. Many of these pre-war trains operated by clockwork or battery power and were made of lithographed tin. The sizes of the cars varied widely, as the standard for O gauge was largely ignored. Dorfan went out of business in 1934, while Ives was bought by Lionel, and Hafner and Joy Line were bought by Marx. Hornby withdrew from the U.S. market in 1930 after selling its U.S. factory to the A. C. Gilbert Company.

As early as 1938, the survivors Lionel, Marx, and American Flyer faced competition from Sakai, a Tokyo-based Japanese toy company who sold trains priced at the low end of the market. The product designs most closely resembled Lionel, but with Märklin-like couplers and detail parts that appeared to be copied from Ives. Seki, another Japanese company, was an entirely different and independent company.

Between 1946 and 1976, the primary U.S. manufacturers of O gauge trains were Lionel and Marx, with American Flyer switching to the more-realistic S scale and the rest of the companies out of business.

Toy maker Unique Art produced a line of inexpensive O gauge trains from 1949 to 1951, but found itself unable to compete with Marx. Marx continued to make clockwork and battery-powered trains and lithographed cars into the 1970s, along with more realistic offerings that were sometimes difficult to distinguish from Lionel.

Sakai re-entered the U.S. market after World War II, selling trains that were often nearly identical to Marx designs and sometimes undercutting Marx's prices, from 1946 to 1969.

A company called American Model Toys brought out a line of realistic, detailed cars beginning in 1948. In 1953 it released a budget line. It ran into financial difficulty, reorganized under the name Auburn Model Trains, and ended up selling its line to Nashville, Tennessee–based Kusan, a plastics company who continued its production until 1961. The tooling was then sold to a small company run by Andrew Kriswalus in Endicott, New York, who operated as Kris Model Trains, or KMT. Kriswalus only produced the box, stock, and refrigerator cars from the Kusan dies, and on some of these cars he mounted die-cast trucks from the Kusan tooling. After Kriswalus' death, the tooling was sold to K-Line and Williams Electric Trains, who continued to use it to produce parts of their budget lines.

From O gauge's beginnings up until the mid-1970s, the various manufacturers' trackside accessories would interoperate with one another, but the train cars themselves used couplers of differing designs, often making it difficult or impossible to use different manufacturers' cars together. The post-War consolidation did little to improve matters: Marx used three different standards, depending on the product line, and Lionel used two, so frequently the companies' own entry-level products were incompatible with their high-end products, let alone with the competition. Hobbyists who wanted differing standards to interoperate had to resort to replacing couplers.

After Marx went out of business in 1978, K-Line bought much of Marx's tooling and entered the marketplace. K-Line's early offerings changed little from the old Marx designs, other than a new brand name and a Lionel-compatible coupler, making K-Line's offerings completely interoperable with Lionel.

As O gauge regained popularity in the 1990s it also started to regain manufacturers, and as of late 2003, no fewer than six companies market O gauge locomotives and/or cars, all theoretically interoperable with one another.

Lionel equipment retains a large collector following. Equipment from shorter-lived manufacturers prior to World War II is also highly sought after, while American Flyer and Marx are less so. Post-War Marx is gaining in popularity after years of being derided by serious collectors. There is little collector interest in Sakai today, possibly because of difficulty identifying the equipment and because the brand is much less widely known than its U.S. counterparts.

The biggest makers of American O scale trains today include Lionel, MTH, Atlas, and Williams by Bachmann.

== In popular culture ==
This scale and gauge was used to model the Skarloey Railway locomotives and rolling stock for series 4 of Thomas & Friends. However, the construction of the engines resulted in difficulties during filming. Series 5 introduced new models of the engines and rolling stock, which were bigger than the gauge 1 standard gauge engines and stock but still ran on O gauge track. They were used up until series 12 before the move to CGI animation. The small scale models occasionally still appeared, usually when interacting with gauge 1 standard gauge engines in series 5, 7 (stock footage), 9 and 10 and Calling All Engines!.

== See also ==
- 3 ft gauge rail modelling – representing 3 ft (914 mm) narrow gauge
- On2 gauge – representing 2 ft (610 mm) narrow gauge
- On30 gauge – narrow gauge modeling in O Scale using H0 scale track
- OO gauge
- HO gauge
- Rail transport modelling scales
- SE scale
