= Toy train =

Toy depicting train

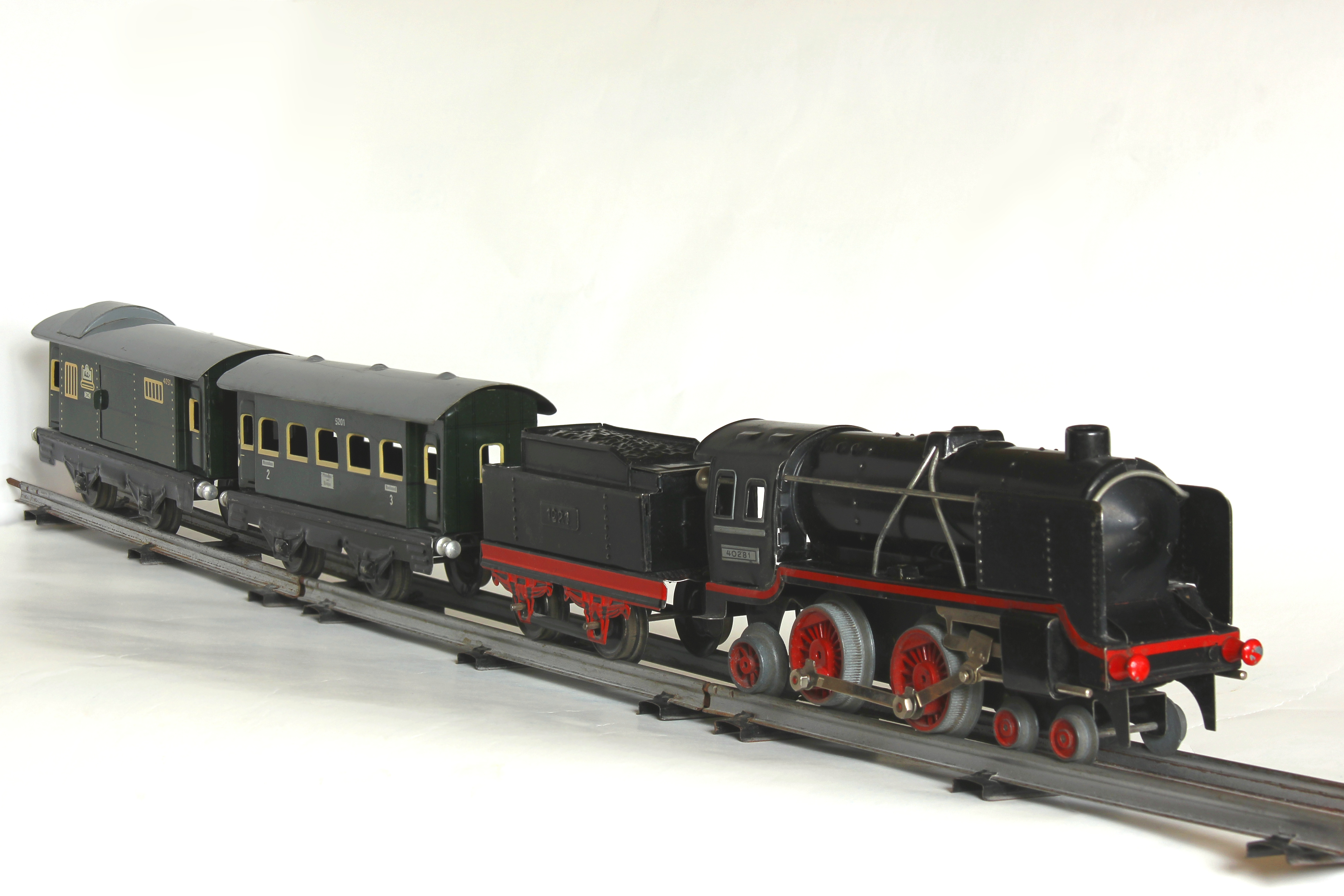
- 0 gauge toy train made by Distler operated by clockwork around 1950
- Type: toy train
- Company: Various
- Materials: various

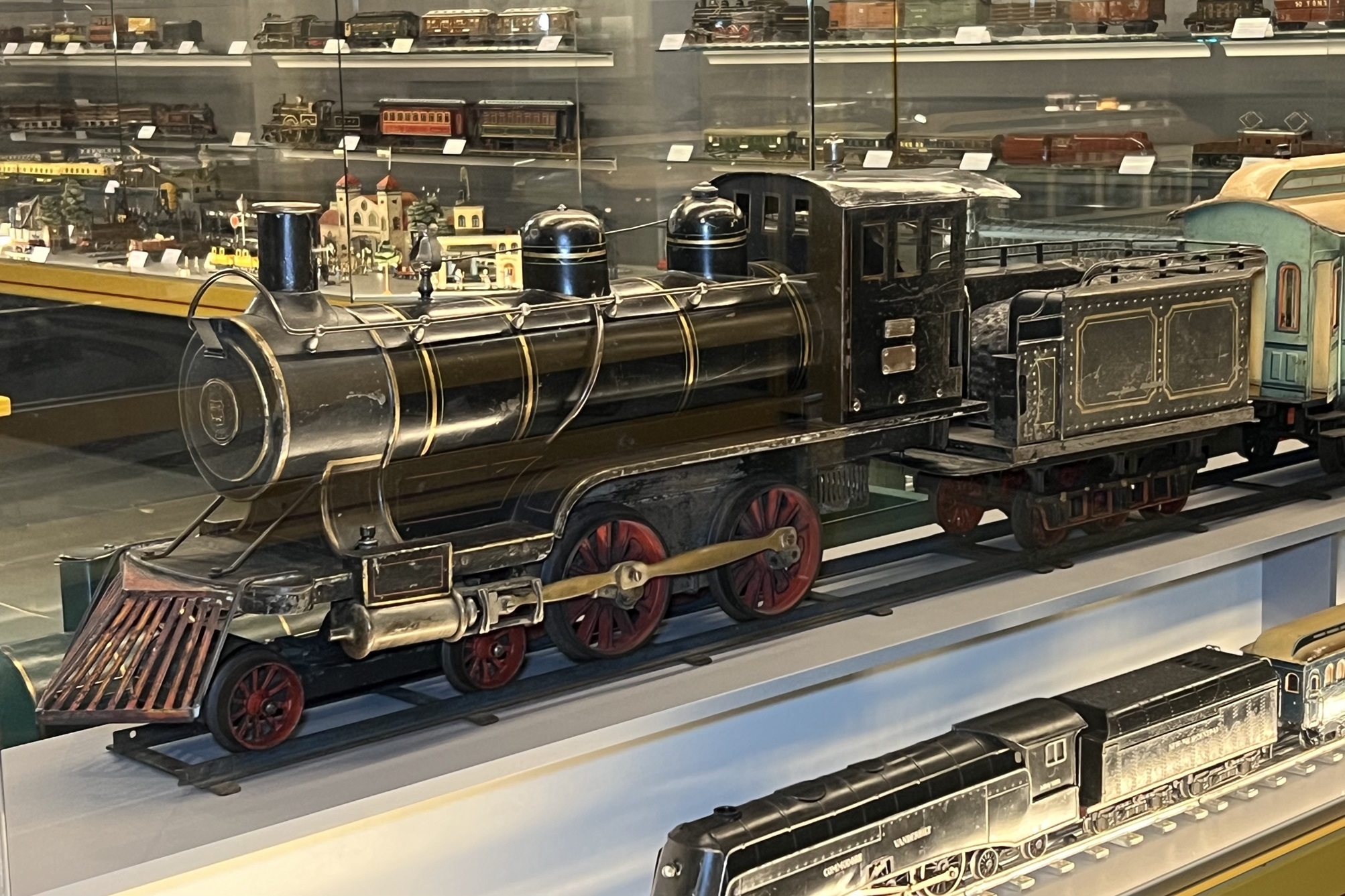
Märklin Gauge 5 steam locomotive from around 1900

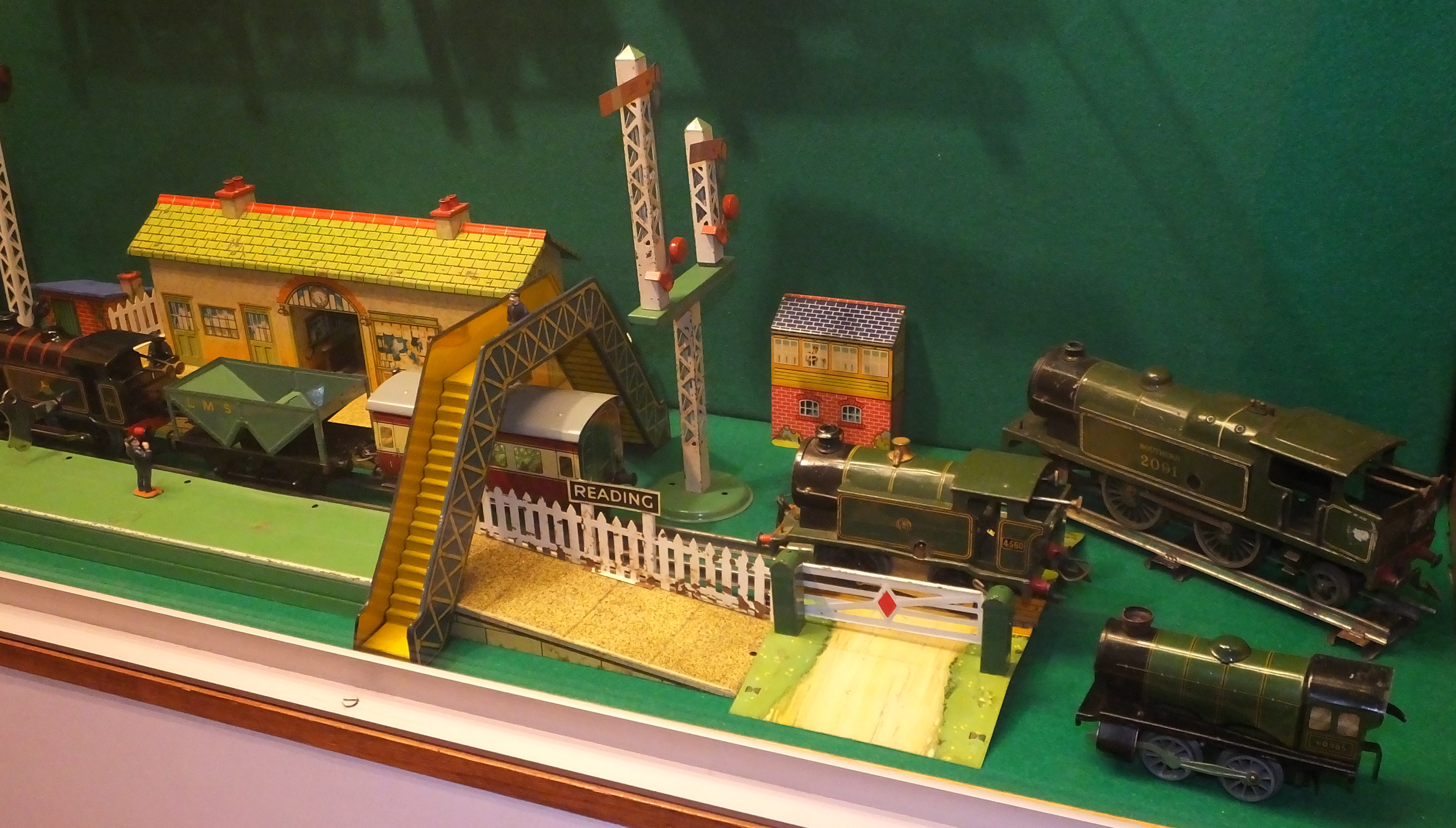
O gauge tinplate trains by Hornby

A toy train is a toy that represents a train. It is distinguished from a model train by an emphasis on low cost and durability, rather than scale modeling. A toy train can be as simple as a toy that can run on a track, or it might be operated by electricity, clockwork or live steam. It is typically constructed from wood, plastic or metal. Many of today's model trains could be considered toy trains, provided they are not strictly to scale or are less detailed in favor of a sturdiness appropriate for children or inexpensive production.

== Definitions ==
"Toy train" usually refers to a reduced-scale model of a train for children to play with. Some similar but larger vehicles are made for children to ride in, typically in parks and playgrounds; often they run on tires and not tracks. If they are meant to resemble trains then these too are called toy trains. Small trains are sometimes also called toy trains. In India, many trains that run on meter-gauge tracks and that are meant for adults are called toy trains. The trains that run on the Darjeeling Himalayan Railway are an example.

For highly accurate train models made for serious hobbyists and collectors, the term "model train" is preferred.

== Standards ==
The first widely adopted standards for toy trains running on track were introduced in Leipzig, Germany in 1891 by Märklin.

| Name | Width (metric/imperial) centers of outer rails | size | Comments |
|---|---|---|---|
| Number 5 gauge | 120 mm or 4.72 in | 1:8 | Also known as V («five» in Roman numerals) |
| Number 4 gauge | 75 mm or 2.95 in | 1:11 or 1:20 | Also known as IV («four») or 3 gauge. Measurement is sometimes also quoted at 2 15/16 in (74.61 mm). |
| Number 3 gauge | 67 mm or 2.64 in | 1:16 or 1:22 or 1:23 | also known as III, II, IIa gauges. |
| Number 2 gauge | 54 mm or 2.13 in | 1:22.5 or 1:27 or 1:28 | also known as II gauge. |
| Number 1 gauge | 45 mm or 1.77 in | 1:32 or 1:30 | Also known as I gauge. Used by modern G scale. |
| Number 0 gauge | 35 mm or 1.38 in | 1:48 or 1:43 or 1:45 or 1:64 | Introduced later, around 1900. This is close to modern O gauge (32 mm or 1.26 in track gauge). |

See also List of rail transport modelling scales.

== USA classification ==
Z Gauge [1:220]

N Gauge [1:160]

HO Gauge [1:87]

S Gauge [1:64]

O Gauge [1:43 to 1:48, varies]

G Gauge [1:20]

Märklin measured the gauge as the distance between the centers of the two outer rails, rather than the distance between the outer rails themselves. Lionel's standard gauge is allegedly the result of Lionel's misreading these standards, as are the variances in O gauge between the United States and Europe.

Most of these standards never really caught on, due to their large size, which made them impractical to use indoors, as well as the high price of manufacturing. Wide gauge trains, which are close in size to 2 gauge, are produced in limited quantities today, as are 1 gauge and O gauge trains. Of these, O gauge is the most popular.

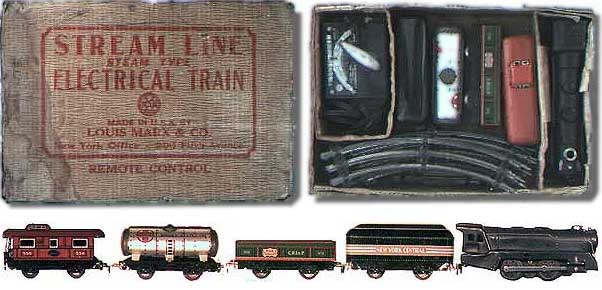
An O gauge Marx toy train set made in the late 1940s or early 1950s

The modern standards for toy trains also include S gauge, HO scale, N scale, and Z scale, in descending order of size. HO and N scale are the most popular model railway standards of today; inexpensive sets sold in toy stores and catalogs are less realistic than those sold to hobbyists. O gauge arguably remains the most popular toy train standard. Another size that is attracting interest among hobbyists is building and operating trains from Lego, or L gauge, which is roughly 1/38 scale.

A "de facto" standard is used by some companies making wooden toy trains that run on wooden tracks. This is usually referred to as "Brio" or "Thomas" compatible in reference to two major companies. The term "Vario System" introduced by the company Eichhorn, refers to a variant of the connecting system used by some modern wooden track producers. The tracks don't use rails as such but rather grooves set apart a certain distance. The same "gauge" is used by the "Lionel Great American Adventure series" produced by Learning Curve, the Plarail system from Tomy and Trackmaster. Although the rolling stock of each system may be used to some extent on the tracks of other systems the compatibility beyond simple straight track and large radius curves may be rather limited.

Playmobil is an example of a company that offers a complete play world system based on its small plastic dolls and has later extended its play world to railways. It has developed two train systems to date. One is aimed at larger children using electric trains and remote control. This track system is designed such that it can also be used outside much like a garden train. The other system is designed for preschool children or even toddlers. An example of a system aimed at the very young is offered among others by the company "Wader Toys". This includes tracks for road and rail as well as waterways. The elements are very simple in design, sturdy and washable as they are thought for play including such environments as sandboxes, mud and water. To scale detail is a very minor issue with such systems that focus rather on sturdiness, avoiding sharp edges and avoiding parts that could be a choking hazard.

Although the words "scale" and "gauge" are often used interchangeably, many toy train manufacturers historically had little concern with depicting accurate scale. American Flyer tended to boast its closer accuracy compared to other manufacturers. The terms "O scale" and "S scale" tend to imply serious scale modeling, while the terms "O gauge" and "S gauge" tend to imply toy trains manufactured by Lionel and American Flyer, respectively. While S gauge is fairly consistent at 1:64 scale, O gauge trains represent a variety of sizes. O gauge track happens to be 1/45 the size of real-world standard gauge track, so manufacturers in Continental Europe have traditionally used 1:45 for O gauge trains. British manufacturers rounded this up to 1:43, which is seven millimeters to the foot. U.S. manufacturers rounded it down to 1:48, which is a quarter-inch to the foot. However, most engaged in a practice of selective compression in order to make the trains fit in a smaller space, causing the actual scale to vary, and numerous manufacturers produced 1:64 scale trains—the proper size for S gauge—in O gauge, especially for cost-conscious lines.

Some of the earliest O gauge trains made of tinplate weren't scale at all, made to unrealistic, whimsical proportions similar in length to modern HO scale, but anywhere from one and a half to two times as wide and tall.

Some adult fans of toy trains operate their trains, while others only collect. Some toy train layouts are accessorized with scale models in an attempt to be as realistic as possible, while others are accessorized with toy buildings, cars, and figures. Some hobbyists will only buy accessories that were manufactured by the same company who made their trains. This practice is most common among fans of Marx and Lionel.

== History ==
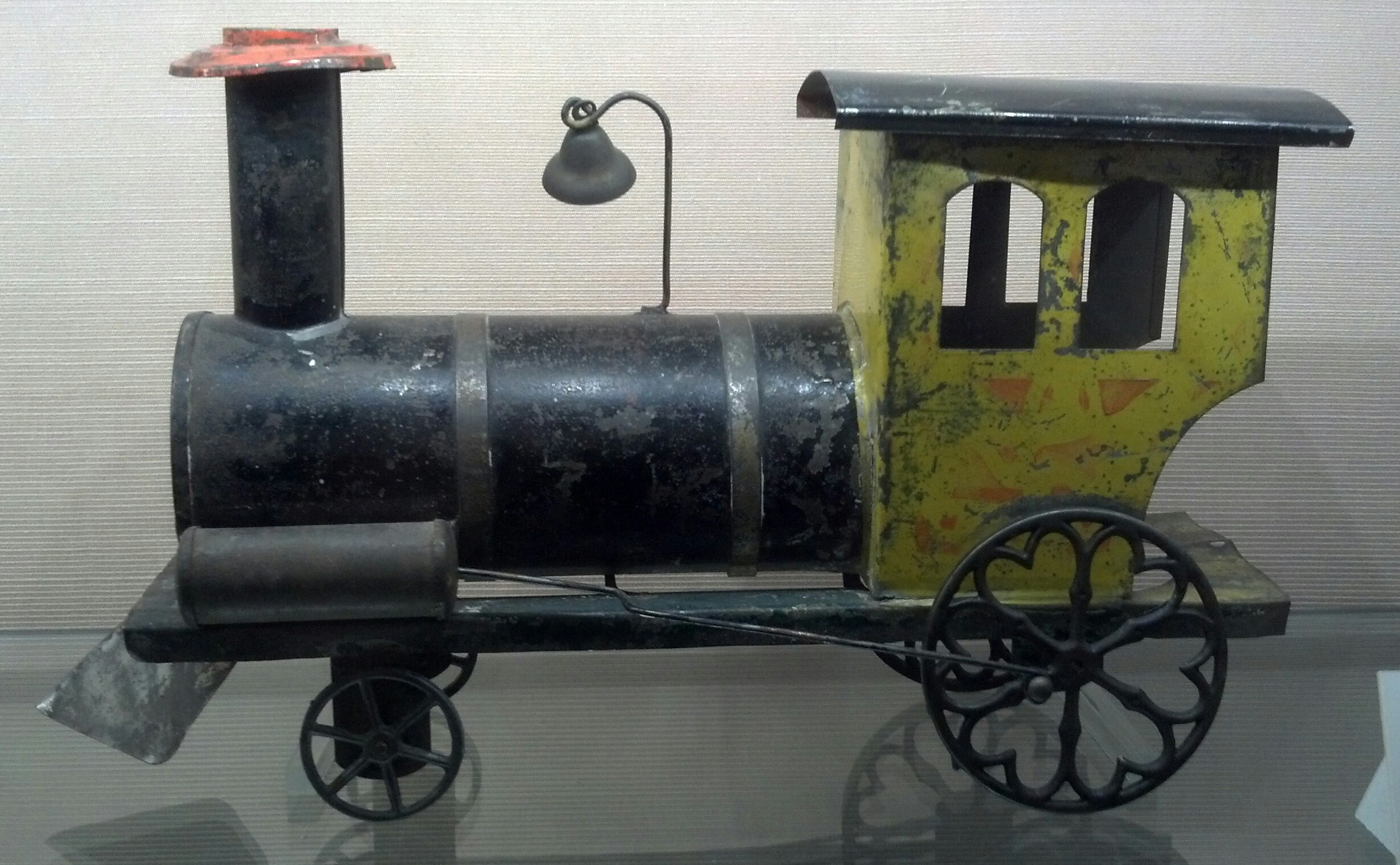
Tin toy locomotive ca. 1870 in the collection of the California State Railroad Museum

The earliest toy trains were made of lead and had no moving parts. Some had wheels that turned, but these had to be pushed or pulled. A few of the early 19th-century push toy trains were made of tinplate, like the large, durable, stylized locomotive toys in the U.S., which were painted red and gold and decorated with hearts and flowers.

Around 1875, technological advancements in materials and manufacturing allowed tin to be stamped, cut, rolled, and lithographed faster than ever before.

Toy trains were revolutionized when Märklin, a German firm that specialized in doll house accessories, sought to create an equivalent toy for boys where a constant revenue stream could be ensured by selling add-on accessories for years after the initial purchase. In addition to boxed sets containing a train and track, Märklin offered extra track, rolling stock, and buildings sold separately, creating the predecessor to the modern model train layout featuring buildings and scenery in addition to an operating train.

Electric trains followed, with the first appearing in 1897, produced by the U.S. firm Carlisle & Finch. As residential use of electricity became more common in the early 20th century, electric trains gained popularity and as time went on, these electric trains grew in sophistication, gaining lighting, the ability to change direction, to emit a whistling sound, to smoke, to remotely couple and uncouple cars and even load and unload cargo. Toy trains from the first half of the 20th century were often made of lithographed tin; later trains were often made mostly of plastic.

Prior to the 1950s, there was little distinction between toy trains and model railroads—model railroads were toys by definition. Pull toys and wind-up trains were marketed towards children, while electric trains were marketed towards teenagers, particularly teenaged boys. It was during the 1950s that the modern emphasis on realism in model railroading started to catch on.

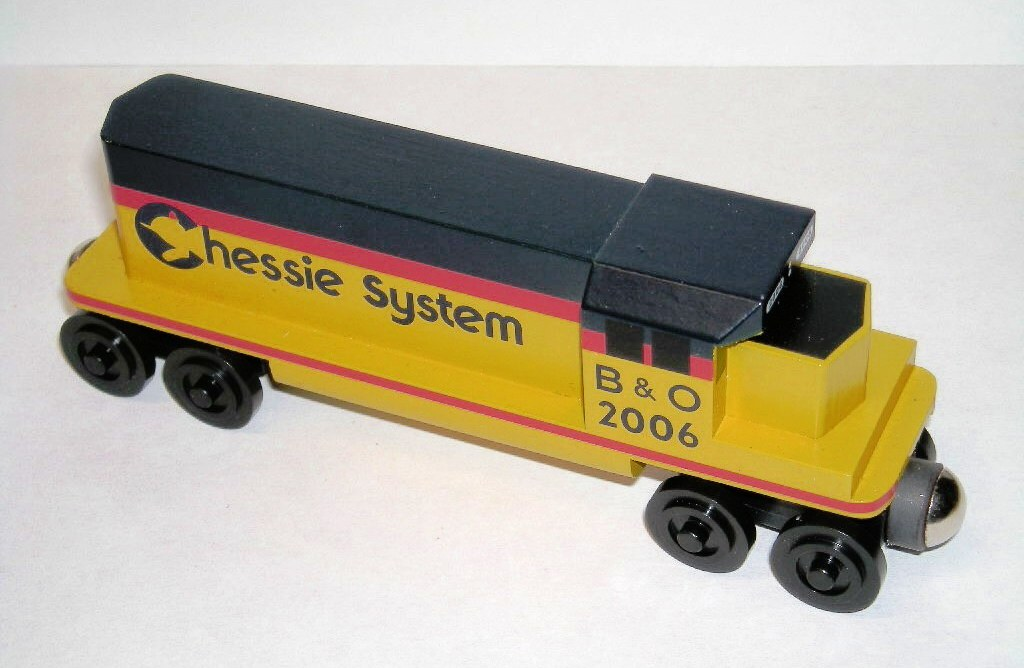
A colorful EMD GP40-2 emblazoned with the Chessie System logo, one of many wooden toy trains offered by Whittle Shortline

Consumer interest in trains as toys waned in the late 1950s, but has experienced resurgence since the late 1990s due in large part to the popularity of Thomas the Tank Engine.

Today, S gauge and O gauge railroads are still considered toy trains even by their adherents and are often accessorized with semi-scale model buildings by Plasticville or K-Line (who owns the rights to the Plasticville-like buildings produced by Marx from the 1950s to the 1970s). However, due to their high cost, one is more likely to find an HO scale or N scale train set in a toy store than an O scale set.

Many modern electric toy trains contain sophisticated electronics that emit digitized sound effects and allow the operator to safely and easily run multiple remote control trains on one loop of track. In recent years, many toy train operators will operate a train with a TV camera in the front of the engine and hooked up to a screen, such as computer monitor. This will show an image, similar to that of a real (smaller size) railroad.

== See also ==
- GeoTrax
- Lego Trains
- Plarail
- Ferrorama (also known as Super Rail)
- Rail transport modelling
- Wooden toy train
- National Toy Train Museum
- Toccata for Toy Trains
