= Boucher (surname) =

Boucher is a French surname.

== List of people with surname Boucher ==
=== A–G ===
- Adrian Boucher (c. 1760–1804), French architect
- Alexandre Boucher (1770–1861), French violinist
- Alfred Boucher (1850–1934), French sculptor
- Andrée Boucher (1937–2007), Canadian municipal politician
- Anouk Leblanc-Boucher (born 1984), Canadian Olympic speed skater
- Anthony Boucher (1911–1968), American fiction author
- Arthur Boucher (1870–1948), Wales international rugby union player
- Billy Boucher (1899–1958), Canadian professional ice hockey player
- Brian Boucher (born 1977), American professional ice hockey player
- Butterfly Boucher (born 1979), Australian singer-songwriter
- Candice Boucher (born 1983), South African model
- Céline Boucher (born 1945), Canadian artist
- Charles Boucher (disambiguation), multiple people
- Charles Boucher de Boucherville (1822–1915), Canadian provincial politician, third Premier of Quebec
- Charles Hamilton Boucher (1898–1951), Knighted Major-General in the British Indian Army during World War II
- Chris Boucher (writer) (1943–2022), British writer
- Chris Boucher (basketball) (born 1993), Saint Lucia-born Canadian basketball player
- Claire Boucher (born 1988), Canadian artist; better known as Grimes
- Claude Boucher (politician) (born 1942), former member of the Quebec National Assembly
- Daniel Boucher (musician) (born 1971), Canadian musician
- Daniel Boucher (politician), Canadian municipal politician
- David Boucher (cyclist) (born 1980), French road cyclist
- David Boucher (political scientist) (born 1951), Welsh political theorist
- Dillon Boucher (born 1975), New Zealand professional basketball player
- Donovan Boucher (born 1961), Jamaican/Canadian boxer of the 1980s, '90s and 2000s
- Eric Reed Boucher (born 1958), American punk musician, better known as Jello Biafra
- Étienne-Alexis Boucher, current member of the Quebec National Assembly, son of Claude Boucher (politician)
- Frank Boucher (1902–1977), Canadian professional ice hockey player
- François Boucher (1703–1770), French painter
- Gaétan Boucher (born 1958), Canadian Olympic speed skater
- Gene Boucher (1933–1994), American operatic baritone
- Georges Boucher (1896–1960), Canadian professional ice hockey player
- Grayson Boucher (born 1984), American professional streetball (basketball variant) entertainer
- Guy Boucher (born 1971), Canadian professional ice hockey coach

=== H–Z ===
- H. A. Boucher (1921–2009), American politician
- Hélène Boucher (1908–1934), French pilot
- Jack Boucher (1931–2012), American photographer
- Jacques Boucher de Crèvecœur de Perthes (1788–1868), French geologist and antiquary
- James Boucher (disambiguation), multiple people
  - James Boucher (cricketer) (1910–1995), Irish cricketer
  - James A. Boucher (1937–2020), American politician, member of the Wyoming House of Representatives
  - Jim Boucher (born 1956), Canadian businessman and political leader
- Jean Boucher (artist) (1870–1939), French sculptor
- Jean Boucher (politician) (1926–2011), member of the Canadian house of Commons
- John William Boucher (1844–1939), Canadian-American American Civil War veteran
- Jonathan Boucher (1738–1804), English clergyman, teacher and philologist
- Judy Boucher (born 1938), Caribbean-English singer
- Louis-Charles Boucher de Niverville (1825–1869), Canadian lawyer and national politician
- Lydia Boucher (1890–1971), Canadian composer
- Marcel Boucher (1898–1965), French-American entrepreneur
- Marin Boucher (c. 1587 – 1671), French colonist of Quebec, Canada; ancestor to most Bouchers in North America, particularly in Quebec
- Mark Boucher (born 1976), South African cricketer
- Maurice Boucher (1953–2022), Canadian convicted criminal
- Maurice Le Boucher (1882–1964), French organist, composer, and pedagogue
- Merle Boucher (born 1946), American state politician
- Nick Boucher (born 1980), Canadian ice hockey player
- Philippe Boucher (born 1973), Canadian professional ice hockey player
- Pierre Boucher de la Bruère (1837–1917), Canadian lawyer, journalist, author and provincial politician
- Pierre Boucher (1622–1717), French-Canadian clergyman and governor of New France
- Richard Boucher (footballer) (1932–2017), French football player and coach
- Richard A. Boucher (1951–2025), American diplomat
- Rick Boucher (born 1946), American national politician
- Robert Boucher (disambiguation), multiple people
- Ron Boucher, Australian rules footballer
- Sandy Boucher (born 1936), American author, Buddhist and feminist
- Savannah Smith Boucher (born 1943), American actress
- Sebastien Boucher (born 1981), Canadian minor league baseball player
- Sherry Boucher (born 1945), American actress
- Sylvie Boucher (born 1962), Canadian national politician
- Tom Boucher (1873–unknown), English footballer
- William Henry Boucher (1842–1906), British cartoonist
- Zacharie Boucher (born 1992), French footballer
- Zachary Boucher (born 1980), US Freestyle Ski Team

== Fictional characters ==
- Bobby Boucher (portrayed by Adam Sandler), protagonist of the 1997 comedy film The Waterboy

== See also ==
- Boucher (disambiguation)
