= Bouchier =

Bouchier is a surname. Notable people with the surname include:

- Antoine Bouchier (1460–1519), French Roman Catholic bishop and cardinal
- Barton Bouchier (1794–1864), English religious writer
- Cecil Bouchier KBE, DFC (1895–1979), served with the British Army, Royal Flying Corps, Indian Air Force and Royal Air Force from 1915 to 1953
- Chili Bouchier (1909–1999), English film and theatre actress
- George Bouchier or Bourchier (died 1643), wealthy merchant of Bristol who supported the royalist cause during the English Civil War
- Gilles Bouchier or Bucherius (or Bucherus) (1576–1665), French Jesuit and chronological scholar
- John Bouchier, 2nd Baron Berners (1467–1533), English soldier, statesman and translator
- John Bouchier-Hayes (born 1944), Irish fencer
- George Bouchier Worgan (1757–1838), English naval surgeon who accompanied the First Fleet to Australia

== See also ==
- Dorothy Britton, Lady Bouchier MBE (1922–2015), translator from Japanese, composer, poet
- Boshier
- Boucher (disambiguation)
- Bourchier
