= David Boucher =

David Boucher may refer to:

- David Boucher (cyclist) (born 1980), Belgian road cyclist
- David Boucher (political scientist) (born 1951), Welsh political theorist and philosopher of international relations

== See also ==
- David Bouchier, British-American essayist and journalist
