= Bocher =

Bocher is a surname. Notable people with the surname include:

- Christiane Bøcher (1798–1874), Norwegian stage actress who was engaged at the Christiania Offentlige Theater
- Édouard Bocher (1811–1900), French politician who was one of the founders of the Conférence Molé-Tocqueville
- Herbert Böcher (1903–1983), German middle-distance runner who competed in the 1928 Summer Olympics
- Joan Bocher (died 1550), English Anabaptist burned at the stake for heresy
- Main Bocher (1890–1976), American fashion designer who founded the fashion label Mainbocher
- Maxime Bôcher (1867–1918), American mathematician who published about 100 papers on differential equations, series, and algebra
- Tyge W. Böcher (1909–1983), Danish botanist, evolutionary biologist, plant ecologist and phytogeographer

== See also ==
- Bôcher Memorial Prize, founded by the American Mathematical Society in 1923 in memory of Maxime Bôcher
- Bôcher's theorem can refer to one of two theorems proved by the American mathematician Maxime Bôcher
- Boucher (surname)
- Bahur
