= Toy Train Reference Library =

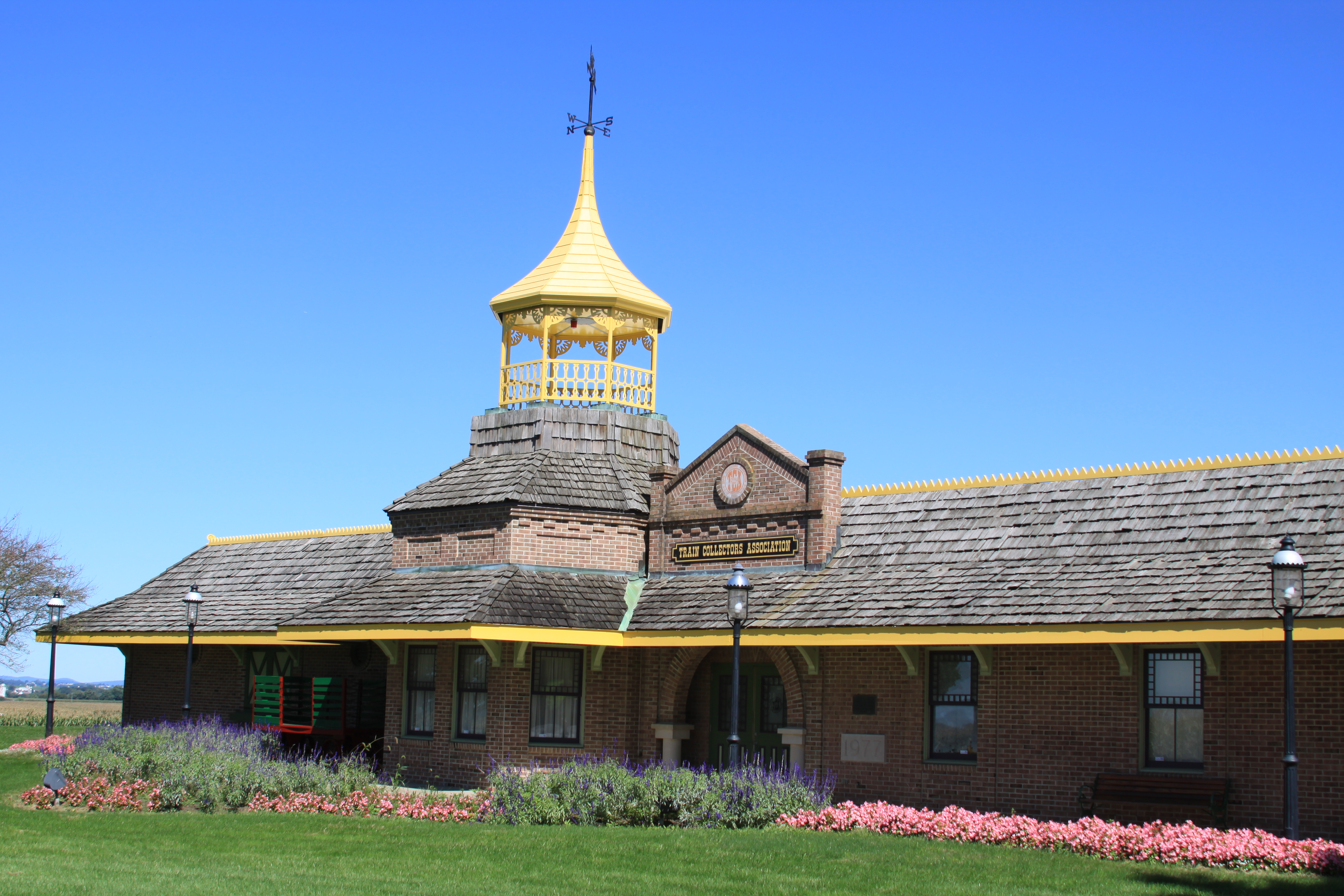
- The library is in the building of the National Toy Train Museum
- 39.9876°N 76.1519°W
- Location: 300 Paradise Lane, Strasburg, Pennsylvania
- Type: Reference
- Scope: Toy trains
- Established: 1977
- Branch of: Train Collectors Association

Collection
- Size: Hours: Jan-March M-F 9 AM-5 PM; Apr-Dec Tues-Fri 9 AM-5 PM; Also open on alternate Mondays and Saturdays. Call ahead to confirm: 717-687-8976

Other information
- Website: nttmuseum.org/library/

The Toy Train Reference Library is a library for members of the Train Collectors Association (TCA) and the public. It has material about the history of the toy train industry and is located in the Train Collectors Association Headquarters building in Strasburg, Pennsylvania, US. Also in the building is the National Toy Train Museum.

It is open to all visitors, and contains a collection of information on the history and characteristics of toy trains, and the industry that produced them, in the United States and around the world. It is a research, not a lending, library, and covers 1,300 square feet (120 m^{2}).
