= James Boucher =

James Boucher may refer to:

- James Boucher (cricketer) (1910–1995), Irish cricketer
- James A. Boucher (1937–2020), American politician, member of the Wyoming House of Representatives
- Jim Boucher (born 1956), Canadian businessman and political leader
