= Carlisle & Finch =

American electrical manufacturing company

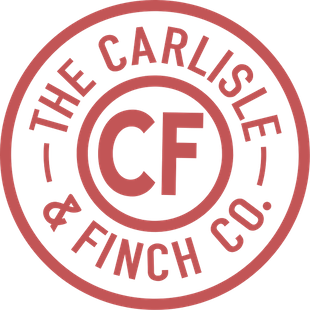
- Type: Corporation
- Industry: Electrical equipment
- Founded: 1893 or 1894
- Founder: Robert S. Finch; Morten Carlisle
- Headquarters: Cincinnati, Ohio, United States
- Products: Electric toy trains; Searchlights
- Website: carlislefinch.com

Carlisle & Finch is an American manufacturer of nautical equipment, headquartered in Cincinnati, Ohio. Founded in 1893 or 1894, the company has focused on searchlights for most of its history, especially for marine applications. Variants of the basic searchlight design have also been used for navigation beacons by airports and lighthouses.

The company is often considered the first in the US to produce electric toy trains, introducing innovations such as using the rails to conduct electrical power to the cars. Although other US companies had produced toy trains, Carlisle & Finch was the first to manufacture and market them in volume, which they did for about the first 20 years of operation. Their sets have become highly prized by model train collectors.

Other early products included electric generators (powered either by water pressure or by gasoline engine). The earliest models were small, intended to power train sets, but they later produced larger units. Gasoline engines for marine use were made under the Clifton Motor Works brand. They also produced electric-powered appliances such as clothes dryers. Since the start of World War I, Carlisle & Finch has concentrated on high-power lighting.

== Corporate history ==
Carlisle & Finch locations within Cincinnati. 1) Elm Street. 2) Sixth Street. 3) Clifton Avenue. 4) Mitchell Avenue.

Carlisle & Finch (C&F) began as a branch office of General Electric (GE) at 182–84 Elm Street in Cincinnati, where electrical engineers Robert Sterett Finch and Morten Carlisle were employed. Finch graduated from the University of Cincinnati in 1890 with a bachelor's degree. Carlisle also received a bachelor's degree, in electrical engineering from the Massachusetts Institute of Technology, the same year.

Work included repairing electrical machinery, such as armatures, transformers, and arc lamps. In 1893 or 1894, C&F purchased the shop from GE for $2,500 (equivalent to $60,000 in 2024 (Note: Historical currency conversions are based on either Gross Domestic Product or Consumer Price Index data.)), intending to continue the repair business and branch out into manufacturing. The new company was incorporated on April 15, 1897, and a June 1897 advertisement listed 830 West Sixth Street as their address. The same year, they introduced their first new products, a searchlight based on the carbon arc principle, and a toy train, which also used a carbon arc for its headlight. C&F's 1900 catalog listed sales agents in New York, Boston, Philadelphia, and Baltimore.

In 1913, C&F protested a ruling by Dudley Field Malone, the Collector of Customs at the Port of New York, that parabolic mirrors imported by the company were subject to a 60% duty as decorated glass. C&F claimed they should be classified as projection lenses which were assessed at 45%. The US Board of General Appraisers upheld the 60% duty. In the years leading up to World War I, toy train sales fell and the company branched out into other lines of business including gasoline engines.

Carlisle sold his share of the business to Finch on August 3, 1926. Brent S. Finch, Robert's son, was named president, and the company started concentrating entirely on its searchlight business. After World War II, Brent R. Finch (son of Brent S.) was hired, at which point three generations of Finches were simultaneously employed by the company. As of 2024, a fourth generation leads the company, with brothers Kurtis B. Finch and Garth S. Finch serving as president and senior vice president, respectively.

Adverse events in the company's history include a 1901 strike, a 1950 fire, and the early 1980s recession. The 1901 strike by 5,000 machinists and allied craftsmen in Cincinnati had only a small effect on C&F. About a dozen workers joined the action, with about 65 men left at work and shop productivity reported to be "slightly handicapped". The 1950 fire destroyed 229 Clifton Avenue, which until shortly before had been their headquarters. C&F had already sold the building to the Cincinnati Board of Education in 1949 and had just moved to a new location at 4562 Mitchell Avenue the previous week. The old building, however, still contained stores of early trains and catalogs which had not yet been removed and these were destroyed in the fire. The 1980s recession severely impacted sales of spotlights for offshore oil rigs (which had previously been their largest market segment) leading to the company's first layoffs.

In a 1962 interview with The Cincinnati Enquirer, Brent R. Finch said that the company "just sort of drifted into the lighting business". Before World War I, they were producing both marine engines and searchlights but government influence during the war pushed them to concentrate on lighting while other companies built engines. According to Brent, "After the war, the competitors were too far ahead of us in engine manufacturing so we stuck with the lights." At the time of the interview, the company was working on lights that could operate at water pressures of 2,000 psi (14,000 kPa) for use on nuclear submarines, and mercury-xenon lamps for coastal lighthouses.

In 2001, Garth Finch told the Cincinnati Business Courier that C&F was starting to use the Internet to improve international sales, which were under pressure from competitors in Europe; he was hoping to reach $1.6 million ($2.91 million in 2025) in overseas sales within three years. Garth also said that they received several inquiries a month from larger companies wanting to buy the business, but that they intended to keep the business private and family-owned. The company had 35 employees at the time. A year earlier, Garth had spoken of expanding into new markets: architectural lighting, smaller ruggedized lighting for use on high-speed boats, and searchlights which could project product images for advertising.

== Electric toys ==
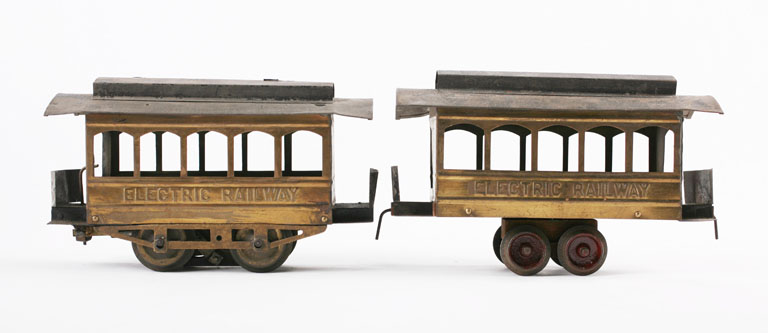
A No. 42 Trolley and Trailer in the permanent collection of The Children's Museum of Indianapolis. Made between 1904 and 1909.

=== Trains ===
One of C&F's earliest products was electric toy trains. The toy train industry had begun in Europe, with simple designs from British and German toy manufacturers. These were followed in the late 19th century by American companies such as C&F who began manufacturing more substantial models.

Other American companies had made toy trains before C&F. Ives Manufacturing Company, founded by Edward Ives, opened a factory in Plymouth, Connecticut, in 1868. These other makers used wind-up clockworks, steam, electric batteries, or overhead wires to power the cars. According to model railroad historian George E. Hoffer, C&F's 1896 advancement was to use the two rails as electrical conductors. Hoffer called this a "striking innovation" although this technology had been demonstrated as early as 1851 by Thomas Hall. Toy encyclopedist Sharon M. Scott writes that C&F's 1897 train set, which she describes as "revolutionary in its day", was driven by a dry-cell battery enclosed in the locomotive body. The Train Collectors Association, considers C&F to have invented the electric toy train since they were the first to produce them in volume. In his 2007 essay about the company, Cincinnati historian David Conzett takes the same track, describing C&F's electric trains as "the world's first mass-produced and marketed".

C&F's wood and metal trains entered the marketplace around 1897. They were approximately 5.5 inches (14 cm) tall and ran on metal track with rails 2 inches (5.1 cm) apart, known as 2 gauge. In 1897, C&F made a train set with a 4-wheel coal mining locomotive, three coal cars, two zinc-carbon elements, and a can of chromite. The locomotive included a switch for starting and reversing, and was powerful enough to pull the three loaded cars up a grade. That same year, they also made an "electric railway with double truck car" set, with a car running on two 4-wheel trucks. It was 12 inches (30 cm) long, 5 inches (13 cm) high, and 3.5 inches (8.9 cm) wide, and made of polished brass with iron wheels. It had two motors and could run at 150 feet per minute (46 m/min). Both sets included 18 feet (5.5 m) of 2-inch (51 mm) gauge track.

In his 1998 New York Times exploration of the history of toy trains, Les Line speculated that an early C&F train set may have been the inspiration which led Joshua Lionel Cowen to start building toy trains. He eventually founded Lionel Corporation, a leading manufacturer of toy trains for most of the 20th century.

=== Other toys ===
Electric automobile

Torpedo boat

Although best known for their toy trains, C&F also produced some electric toys of other types. Two battery-powered models were introduced in 1899; an automobile and a torpedo boat probably based on those used in the Spanish–American War. This entire line of business was discontinued at the onset of World War I.

The 10-inch (250 mm) long automobile sold for $3.50 ($135.45 in 2025). It had 4-inch (100 mm) wheels, weighed 8 pounds (3.6 kg) in its wooden box, and could run for up to an hour on its rechargeable bichromate battery. The front wheels could pivot, controlled by a steering lever. The 1900 catalog listing proclaimed that "Electricity will undoubtedly be the universal method of propulsion for all vehicles in the near future" and that the model was "an exact reproduction of the large electric automobiles which may be seen in such numbers at the present day".

The 24-inch (610 mm) torpedo boat sold for $6.00 ($232.20 in 2025). Constructed from copper, it included two watertight compartments to make it unsinkable and could run for two hours on its one-cell bichromate battery. The boat with battery weighed 5 pounds (2.3 kg) and included an adjustable rudder which could be set to make it run straight ahead or in a circle.

=== Miniature Electric Railway Construction ===
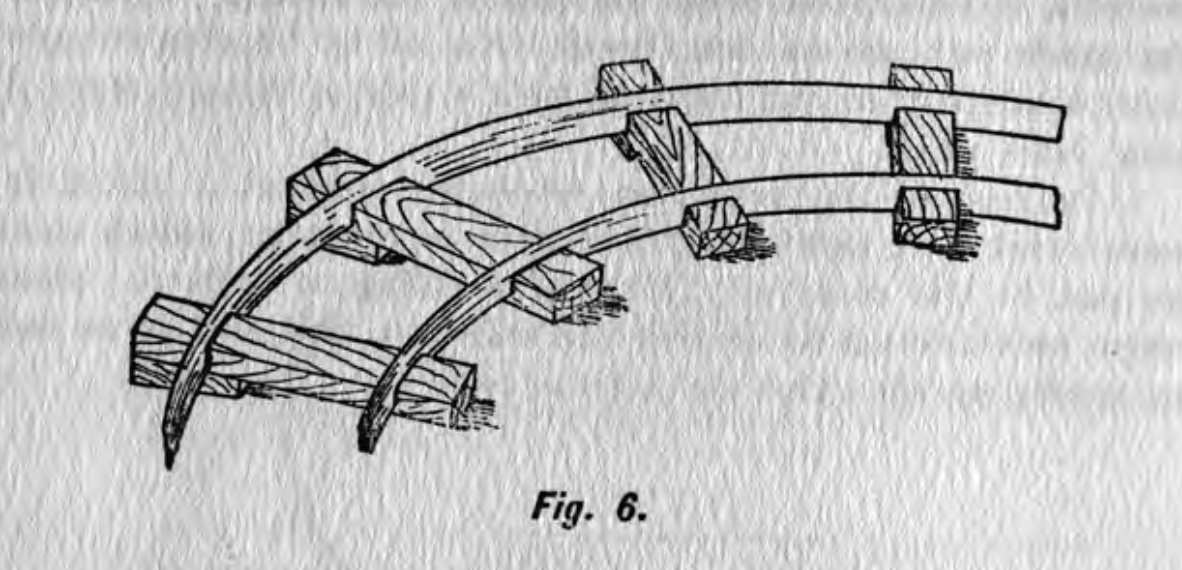
Construction of a banked curve

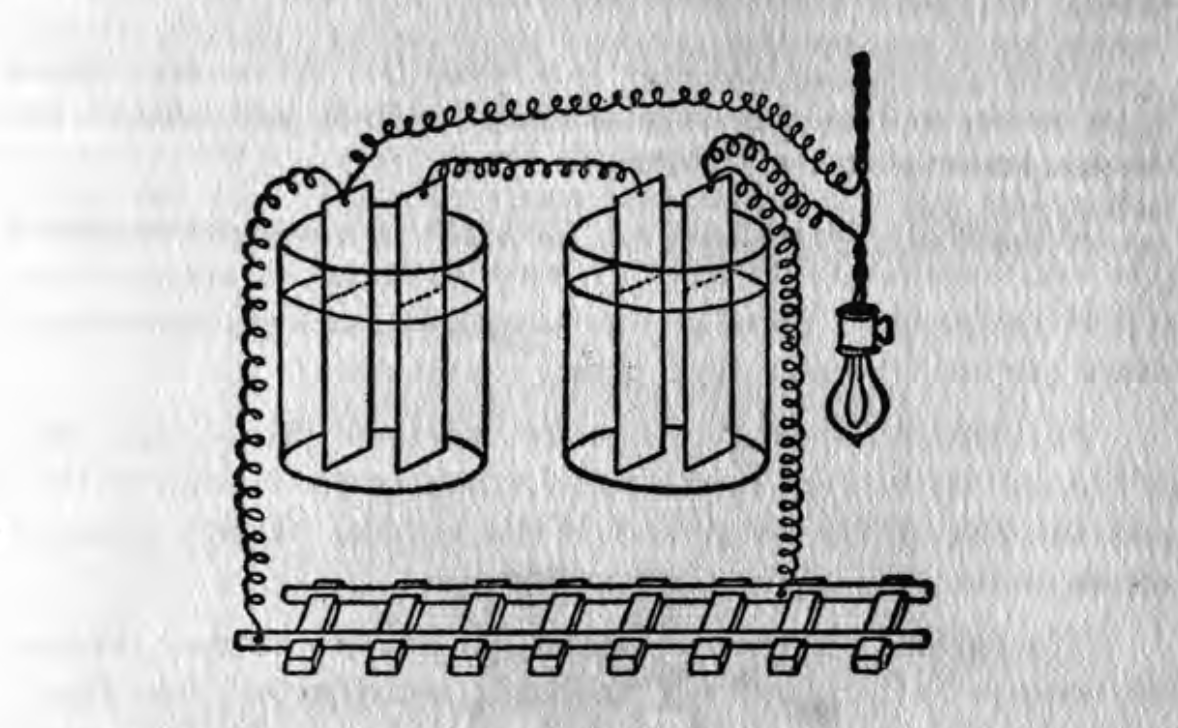
Battery charging from 110-volt lighting circuit

Illustrations from Miniature Electric Railway Construction

In 1906, C&F published a 58-page booklet titled Miniature Electric Railway Construction. The introduction stated that the book was intended for "wide-awake boys" who are interested in the study of electricity, that model railroads were "undoubtedly the best means of studying the practical workings of electricity", and that it would be useful to readers looking to purchase electrical toys as Christmas presents. The book consisted of seven chapters, each of which concentrated on a particular aspect of model railroading. Topics included track construction, banked curves, signalling, direct current motor theory, and switches, with a discussion of which components could be home-built or should be purchased as finished items. Several chapters were devoted to aspects of delivering electrical power to the cars, how power was routed within the cars themselves, and construction of battery systems.

The book garnered some literary attention. Brookline, Massachusetts librarian Harriet Stanley included it in her 1908 Something to Read for Boys and Girls under "Occupations for Boys". In 1913, the New York Public Library placed it on A Selected List of Books on Engineering, Industrial Arts and Trades and the San Francisco Public Library included it in their 1910 List of Books on Electricity under "Experiments and Amateur Apparatus".

=== 1910 catalog ===
Carlisle & Finch catalog, c. 1910

C&F's c. 1910 catalog included three train sets ranging from one car and a 3-foot (0.9 m) circle of track for $3.50 ($120.94 in 2025) to a coal train with four cars and 18 feet (5.5 m) of configurable track for $5.00 ($172.77 in 2025). All of these included components to build a three-cell battery with customer-supplied glass jars for the chromite wet cells.

For $7.00 ($241.87 in 2025), one set could be ordered with motors wound to run from a 110 volt direct current lighting circuit for continuous use in a show window. Available options included additional non-powered cars, an inclined plane railway, a brass truss bridge, a cross-over track fixture for building a figure-8 layout, a rail switch, and railway station with automatic signals. A hand-cranked or belt-driven dynamo and a water-driven generator were also available.

The 20-inch (510 mm) tall inclined plane model was patterned after Cincinnati's Price Hill incline, located near the C&F factory. The $4.00 ($138.21 in 2025) model had two platforms which rode on inclined rails with one going up as the other came down, driven by a small electric motor. Conzett writes that only 120 of these were ever produced and none are believed to still exist.

=== Collectability ===
By 1991, C&F train sets had become rare collectables. W. Graham Claytor Jr, who was president of Amtrak at the time, was reported by the Train Collector Quarterly to have "one of the finest collections anywhere of trains by Carlisle & Finch". Claytor noted that the trains were not exact scale models, but were proportionally shorter, fatter, and taller than full-sized trains. The shortness helped the models negotiate curves better.

In 2014, a C&F model 45 train set sold for $46,020 ($62,587 in 2025) at auction. The exact manufacture date of the set, consisting of a locomotive, tender, and passenger cars, was unknown but stated to be c. 1904 – c. 1908. A boxed set of freight cars sold at the same auction for $23,600 ($32,096 in 2025). Reporting on the auction, Antique Trader described C&F as a "revered American manufacturer". As well as the actual trains, C&F catalogs are collectable; a set of over a dozen 1904–1931 catalogs from toy train manufacturers Ives, Boucher, C&F, and Voltamp brought $1,980 ($3,702 in 2025) at a 2000 auction.

== Searchlights ==
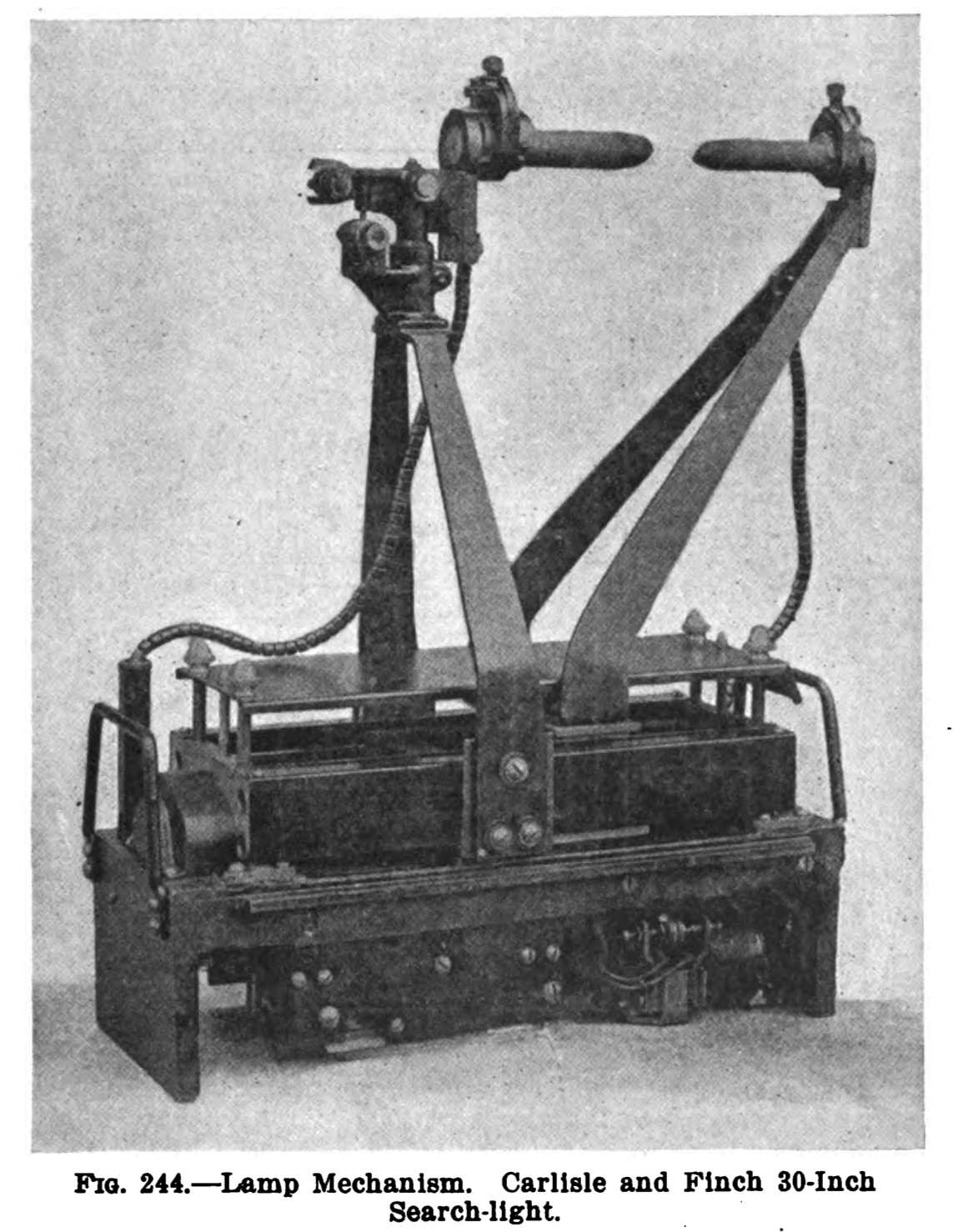
Carbon arc lamp mechanism from 30-inch searchlight

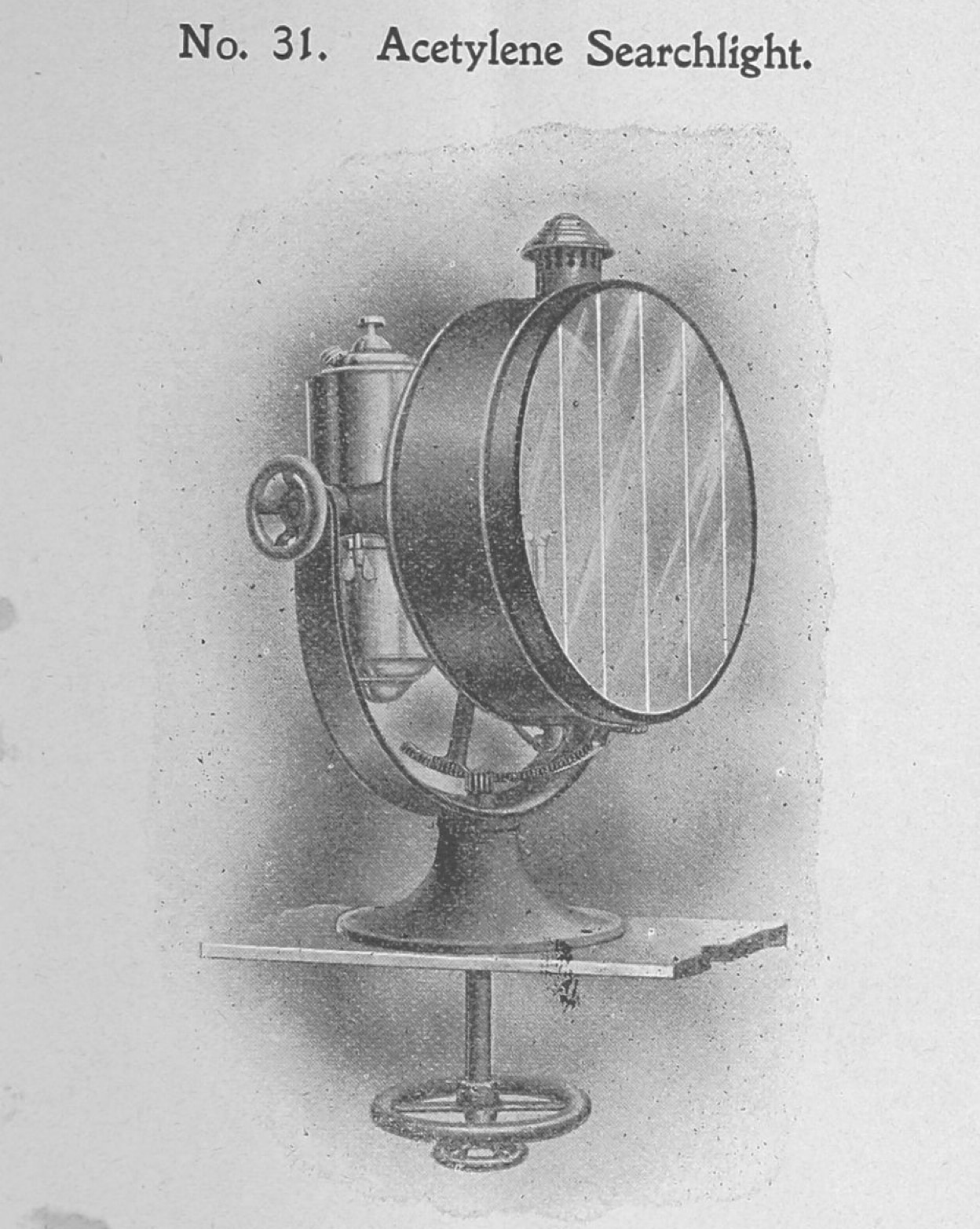
Deck-mounted 12-inch acetylene searchlight

C&F introduced an electric searchlight in 1897. Their "Form 2" model included steering gear for remote adjustment of azimuth and elevation and a ball-bearing mount. By the next year, C&F searchlights were in use on several Yukon River steamers including the Charles T. Hamilton, the John Cudahy, and the T. C. Powers, as well as on the City of Seattle. A 1914 C&F advertisement claimed that 90% of the vessels on US and Canadian inland waterways had searchlights manufactured by the company.

The 1899 C&F catalog listed a 12-inch (300 mm) searchlight which ran on acetylene gas, with a range of 800 feet (240 m). The unit cost $25.50 ($881.10 in 2025) or $29.50 ($1,019 in 2025), depending on the type of mount.

When World War I started, production was shifted entirely to searchlights, to aid the war effort. The US Government was a major purchaser, and large orders also came from Greece, Spain, Norway, and Russia. By 1917, C&F was one of the few companies worldwide producing searchlights, and had supplied a large proportion of the searchlights then in use by the United States and other countries. They produced a line of commercial searchlights, and also specialized in navy and military designs. Units were built with 9-to-60-inch (23 to 152 cm) diameters, and 2-to-6-mile (3.2 to 9.7 km) ranges. Units drew from 10 to 200 amps of electrical current, depending on size. A motorized feedback mechanism automatically adjusted the carbon gap to strike an arc when the lamp was turned on and then maintain a fixed voltage (typically 55 volts) during operation.

The earliest models used a carbon arc for the light source. Compared to incandescent bulbs, a carbon arc is superior for searchlight use since it approximates a point source which can be accurately placed at the focal point of a mirror, resulting in uniform illumination across the light beam. The disadvantage is that the carbon rods are consumed in operation, requiring a mechanism to keep moving the rods so the arc remains at the focus. A pair of carbons had a lifetime of about seven hours.

Other companies had previously built carbon arc searchlights, but C&F added the innovation of mounting the carbon electrodes horizontally on the beam axis. The tip of the positive carbon faced the reflector, maximizing the amount of light reflected, and spacing of the carbons was adjusted by motorized screw-feed mechanisms. A manually activated screw moved the entire mechanism forward and backward, positioning the arc at the mirror's focal point.

=== Signal lights ===
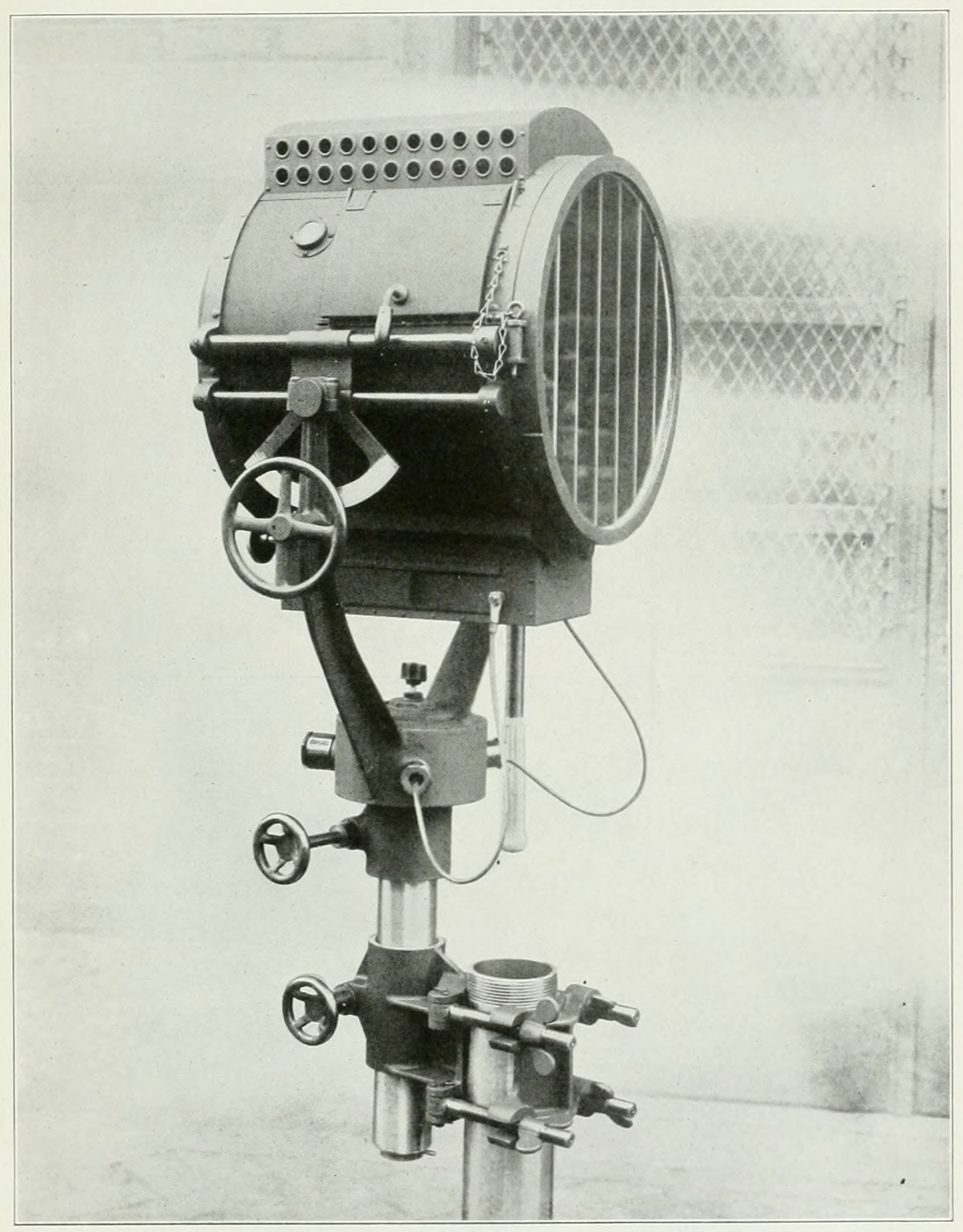
Front

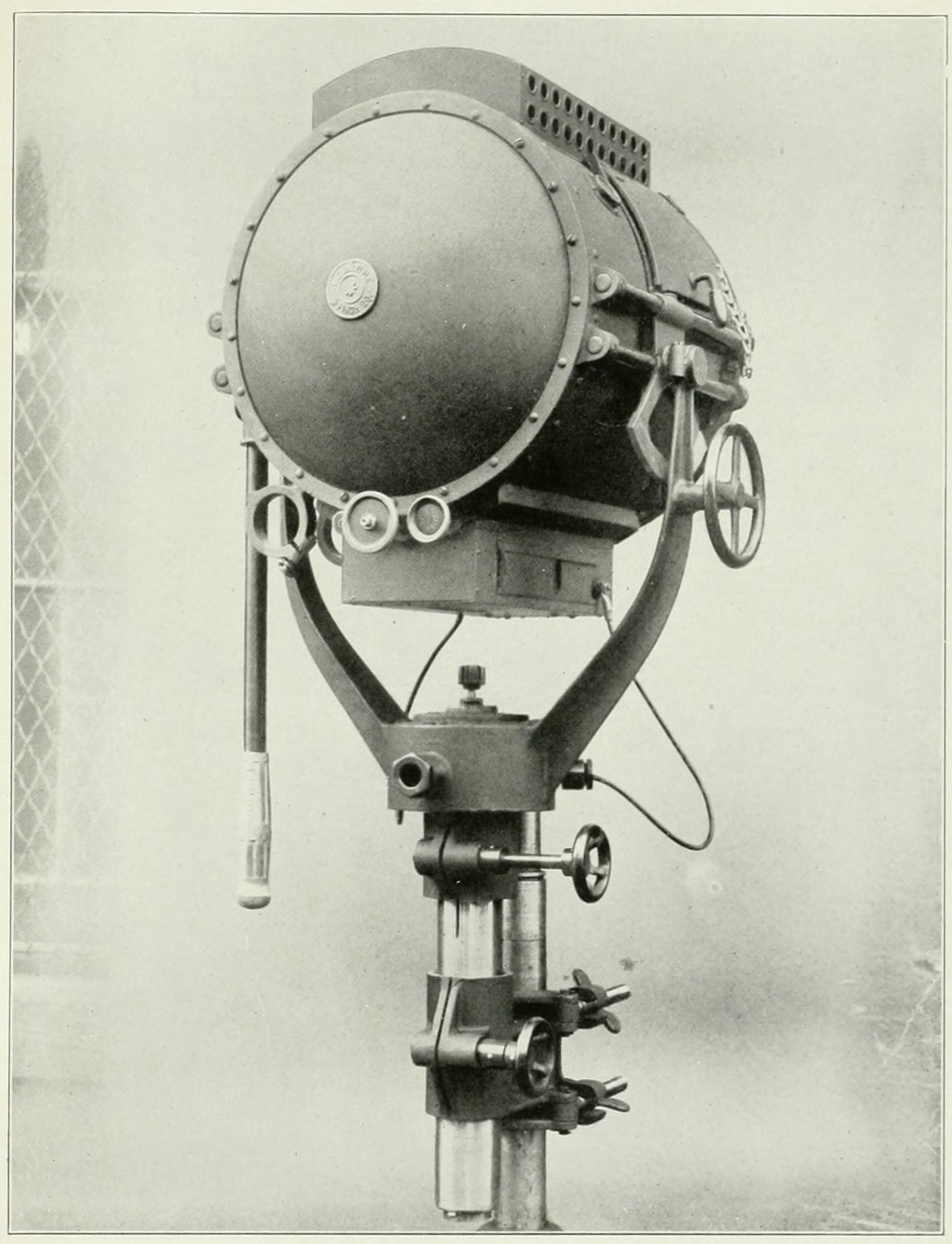
Rear

Carlisle & Finch 12-inch signal searchlight

A 1918 US Navy technical training manual listed two manufacturers who supplied low-power signal searchlights to the Navy: GE and C&F. A signal searchlight is optimized for sending coded light signals rather than illuminating a target. It is equipped with a hand-operated shutter for rapidly turning the beam on and off, a precision sight for accurate beam aiming, and mounting clamps so the unit may be easily relocated.

The major differences between the GE and C&F signal lights were the mechanisms used to adjust the carbon rods as they were consumed. In both types the adjustment was automatic, but the GE unit used a ratchet whereas C&F employed a pair of motor-driven leadscrews. The manual said that the C&F mechanism was "excellent and gives almost no trouble; it operates smoothly, easily, accurately, and is seldom in need of repair or attention".

=== Modern era lights ===
The company introduced xenon arc searchlights in the 1960s. LED models followed in 2019. C&F searchlights are used in the US federal prison system. They also produce searchlights which combine a xenon light with an infrared filter to emit a beam which is invisible to the human eye. These can be used in conjunction with night-vision systems to illuminate targets without disclosing the position of the searching vessel.

A 1974 study of wingtip vortices conducted in a NASA Langley Research Center wind tunnel used an array of three C&F 19-inch (480 mm) incandescent searchlights to provide the high levels of illumination needed to visualize the vortices. The requirements were for a narrow beam (1-to-2-degree beam spread) and illumination levels on the order of 1,000 foot-candles. Twelve commercially available units from four companies were evaluated before selecting the C&F model. While the xenon and carbon arc light sources produced a theoretically preferable circular beam, an incandescent unit was chosen for its simplified power requirements and lower cost, despite producing a beam of "somewhat rectangular shape".

As of 2026, the company manufactures xenon searchlights rated at 200 to 2,500 watts, alongside LED models in 10-to-19-inch (250 to 480 mm) sizes. Other products include halogen searchlights, combined xenon and LED units, offshore vessel searchlights, infrared and night vision systems and Morse code signalling searchlights for pleasure yachts.

== Navigation beacons ==
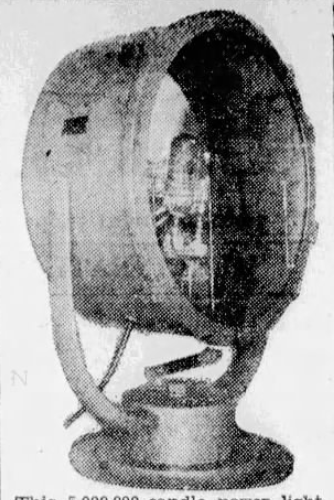
24-inch C&F aero beacon installed atop the Union Central LIfe Insurance building

In 1929, a 24-inch (61 cm) C&F beacon was installed on top of the Union Central Life Insurance Building in downtown Cincinnati, as a visual navigation aid for Lunken Airport. The five million candlepower beam was visible from 50 miles (80 km) away on a clear night. Known as a "course marker beacon", it included a two-position automatic bulb changer which was tied into the building's main telephone switchboard to activate a warning light when the backup bulb was put into service.

C&F produced rotating beacons in the DCB (Directional Code Beacon) series starting around 1950. These project a narrow light beam. The light rotates, causing it to appear to flash from the viewpoint of a distant observer. These were originally used as aerodrome beacons, but in the 1990s, the United States Coast Guard adopted them for use in lighthouses, replacing existing Fresnel lenses. Models included DCB-24 with a 24-inch diameter, DCB-224 with two such lights, and DCB-36 with a 36-inch (91 cm) diameter.

In 1961, the Coast Guard installed C&F's first beacon designed for a coastal lighthouse. Described at the time as "the most powerful lighthouse beacon on US coasts", it consisted of a rotating assembly with a pair of 36-inch lights facing in opposite directions. Each light had a 2500-watt mercury-xenon arc lamp and a 36-inch mirror, producing a 100-million candlepower beam. It drew 100 amps of current in steady operation and required 50,000 volts during startup. It was installed in the new Buzzards Bay Entrance Light where it would be used mostly in bad weather, supplementing a smaller beacon which would operate on clear nights. At the time, C&F was reported to have 35 employees.

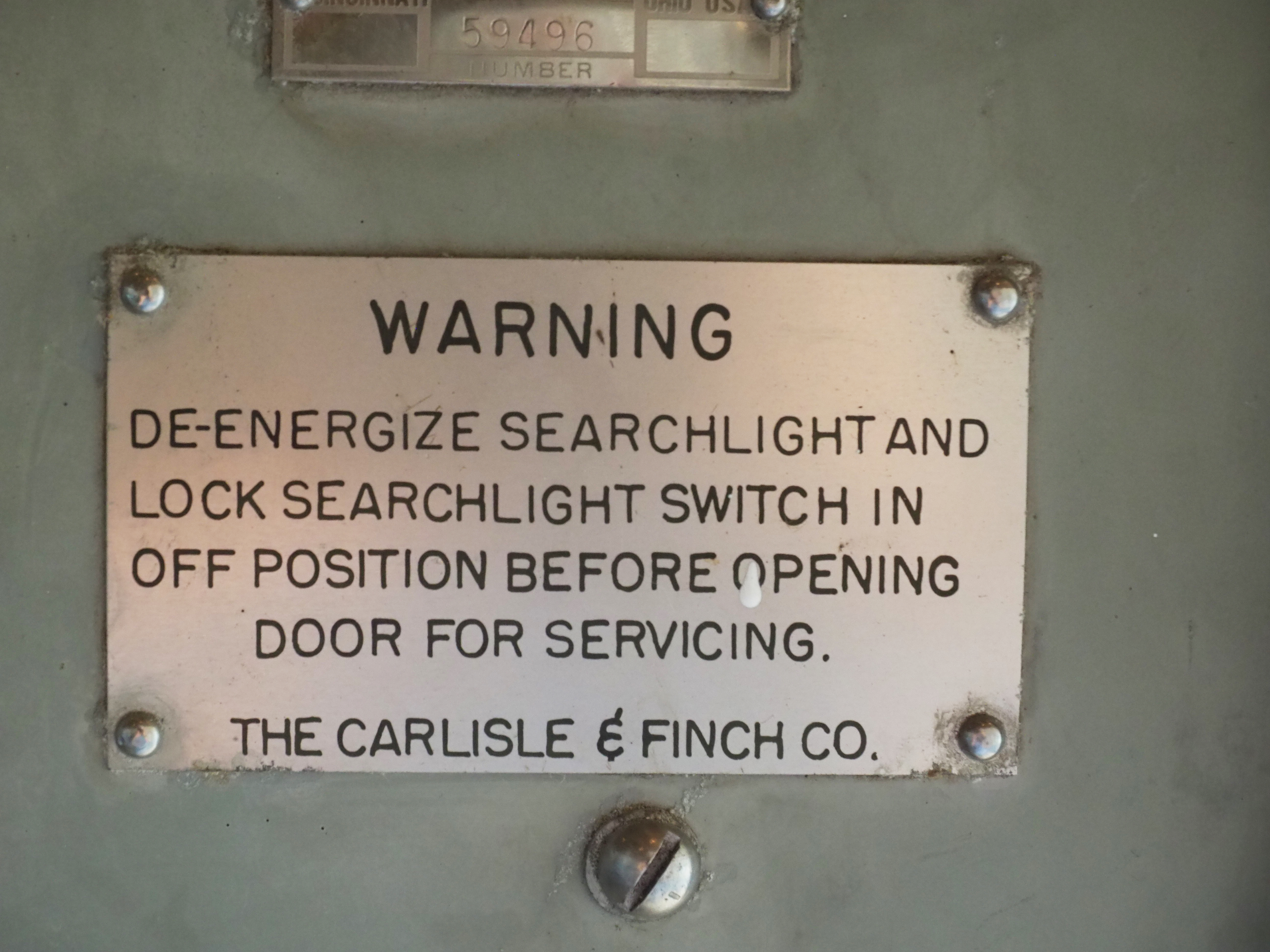
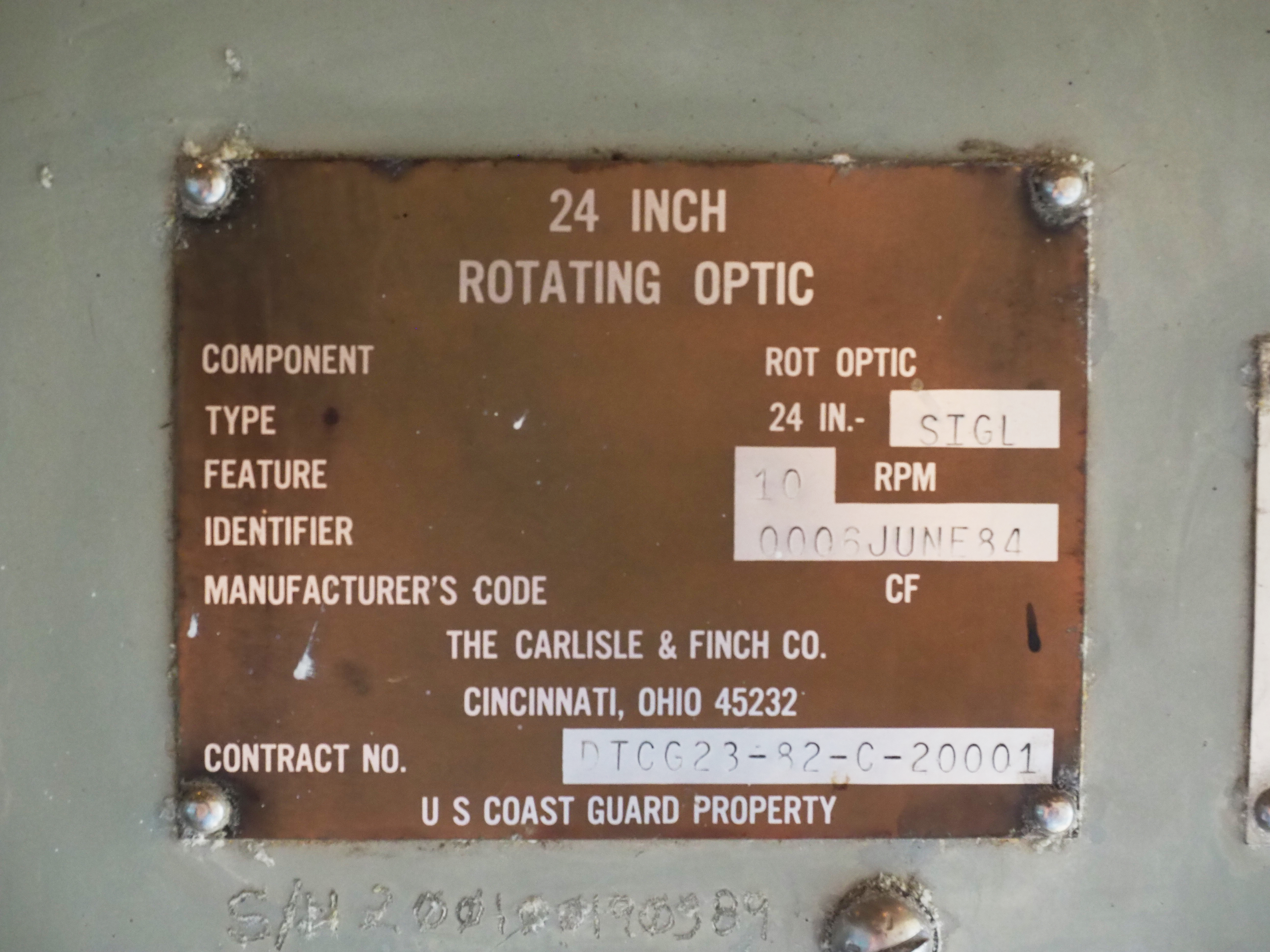
Information plates attached to marine beacon at the Beavertail Lighthouse museum

As of 1984, the DCB-24 and DCB-224 were the standard optics used in landfall lights (the first lights seen when approaching the coast from the open sea). They have a nominal range of 13–26 nautical miles (24–48 km; 15–30 mi) depending on the rotation speed and whether a colored cover was installed. They could operate in winds up to 100 knots (190 km/h; 120 mph), and included an automatic lamp changer.

C&F manufactured a 14-inch (36 cm) range light (RL-14). These could be configured to show a white, yellow, red, or green beam. A 1998 Coast Guard technical manual lists two variations on the RL-14; one manufactured by Tideland Signal Company (model RS-355) and the other from C&F (model RS-10668) with the C&F version being considered the standard unit. Both versions were equipped with a six-position automatic bulb changer using 12-volt bulbs.

== Clifton marine engines ==
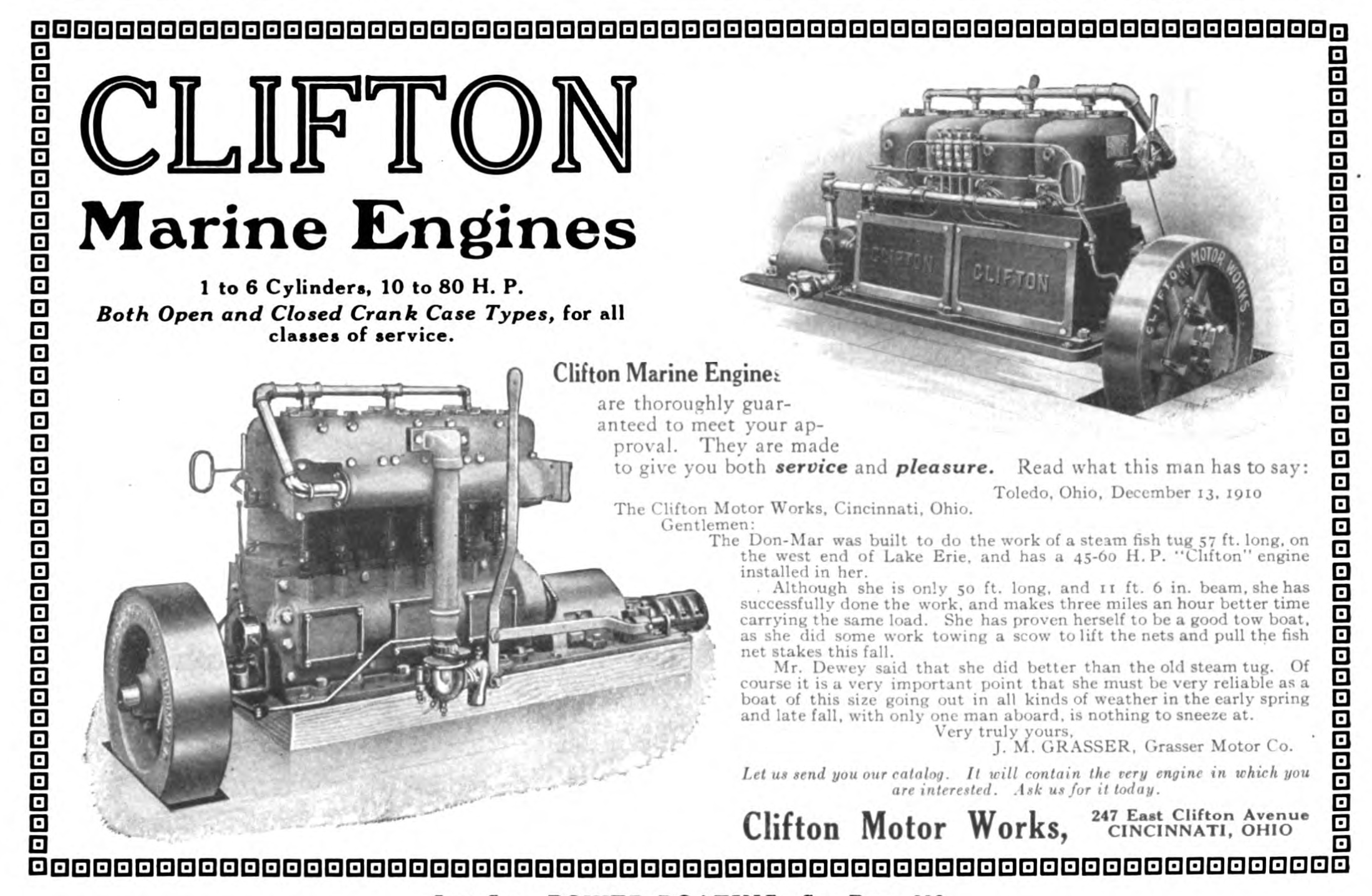
Clifton Motor Works advertisement, Power Boating Magazine, November 1911

C&F produced gasoline engines for marine use in the early 1900s, marketed under the "Clifton" brand, and exported to as far away as New Zealand. Stock sizes were offered from 10 horsepower (7.5 kW) to 65 horsepower (48 kW), with larger sizes advertised or available on special order.

Some of these engines were designed to include a variable number of cylinders, each of which produced 7 horsepower (5.2 kW); for example, three cylinders could be ganged together to produce a 21-horsepower (16 kW) engine. These used a single casting for the head and cylinder, with piston replacement done by unbolting the big end of the connecting rod and removing the piston through the bottom of the cylinder. Lubrication was automatic, with a pump drawing oil from a sump.

The canal boat Monitor, built in 1903 and designed specifically for use on the Erie Canal by the Ohio Boat Company, used a C&F 16-horsepower (12 kW) four-cylinder four-cycle marine engine. The design was in response to a $50,000 ($1.73 million in 2025) reward offered by New York State for a type of boat which would not cause destructive erosion of the canal's banks. Monitor, owned by the Fox Paper Company, was one of about six similar vessels built by Ohio Boat; some used the C&F Clifton engines; others used engines from Fairbanks, Morse or from Meitz & Weiss.

== Other products ==
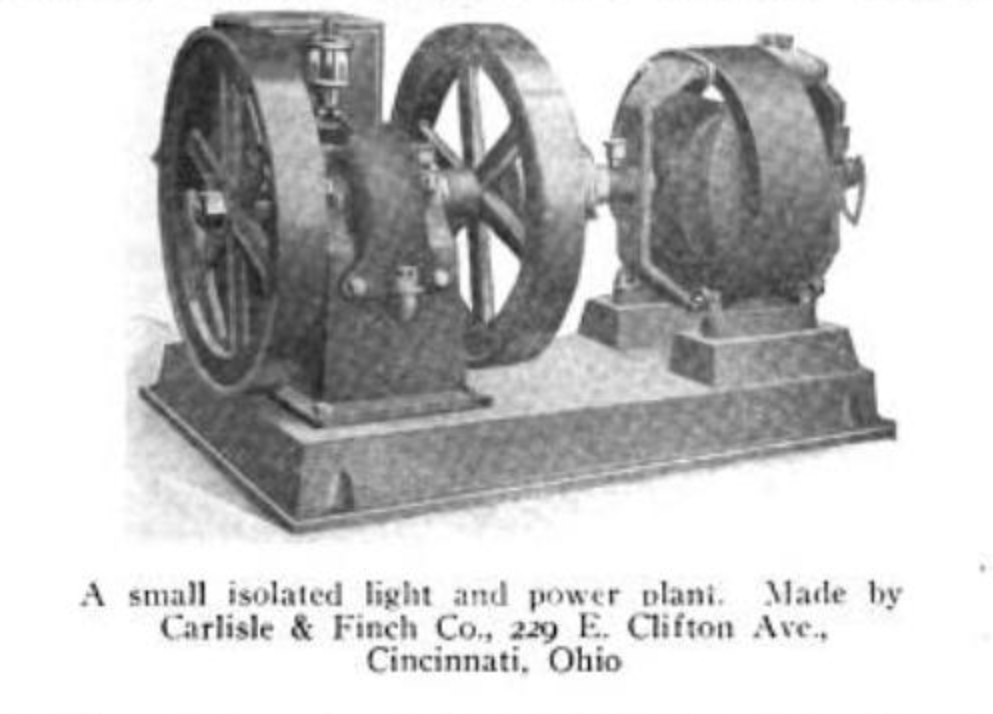
Gasoline-powered dynamo, 1912

In 1897, C&F offered a hand-powered dynamo, capable of lighting a ten candlepower, ten-volt incandescent bulb, or to run several electrical toys simultaneously. They also offered a water-powered version, which produced a similar amount of electrical power from a water faucet supplying 50 psi (340 kPa) of pressure and could be used with as low as 40 psi (280 kPa).

In 1912, C&F introduced a dynamo driven by a directly connected gasoline motor. The engine was 1.5 horsepower (1.1 kW), and the dynamo produced 42 volts at 15 amps. A belt pulley was included for driving an external load. The entire assembly weighed 395 pounds (179 kg).

In 1923, a clothes dryer was introduced. The device used a wire mesh drum rotated by an electric motor. Air heated by either gas or steam was forced through the drum, with the temperature controlled by a thermostat. The machine was 30 inches (76 cm) deep, 38 inches (97 cm) wide, 42 inches (110 cm) tall, and weighed 400 pounds (180 kg).

== Gallery of early advertisements ==
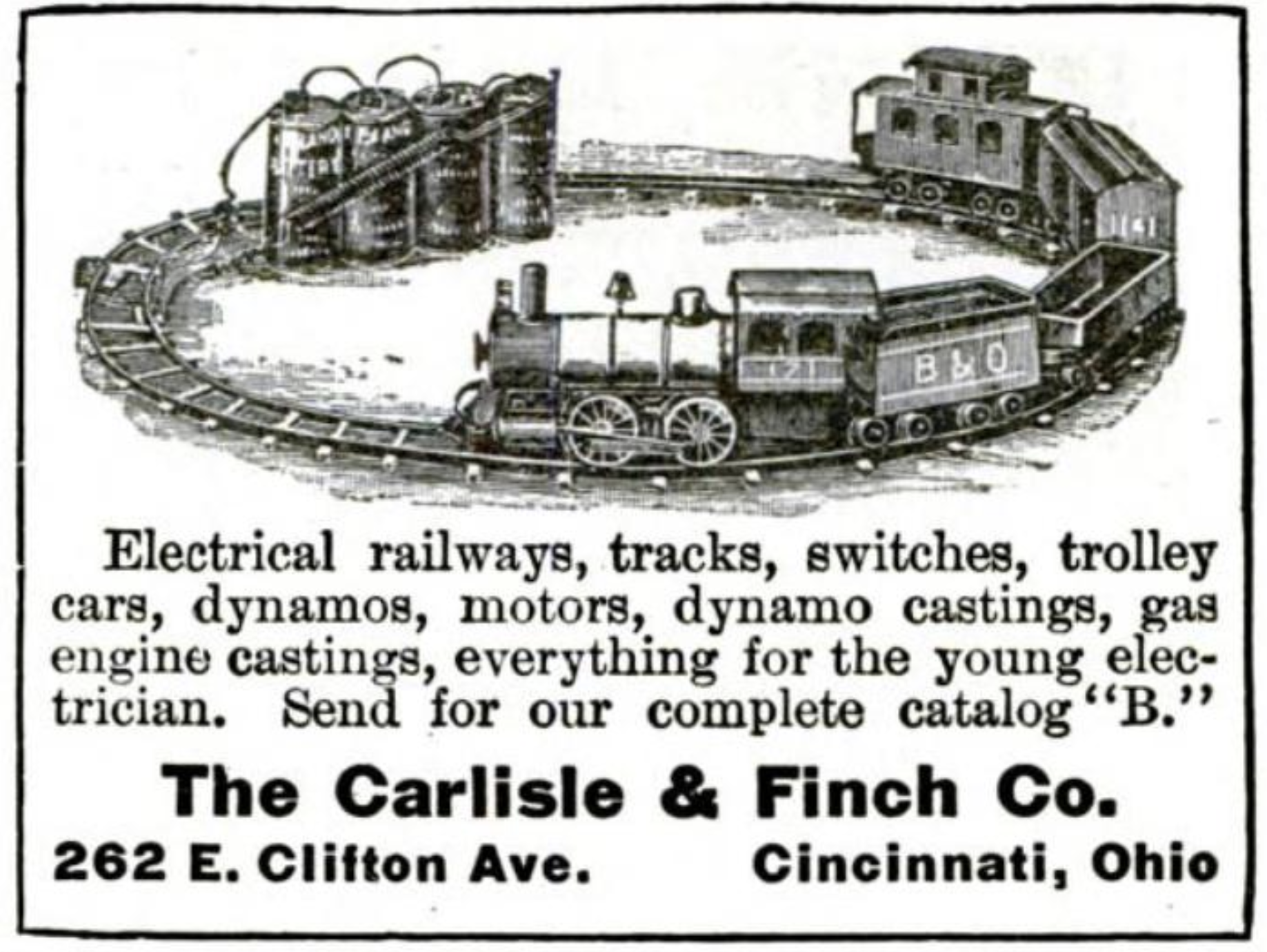
1912: Toy train

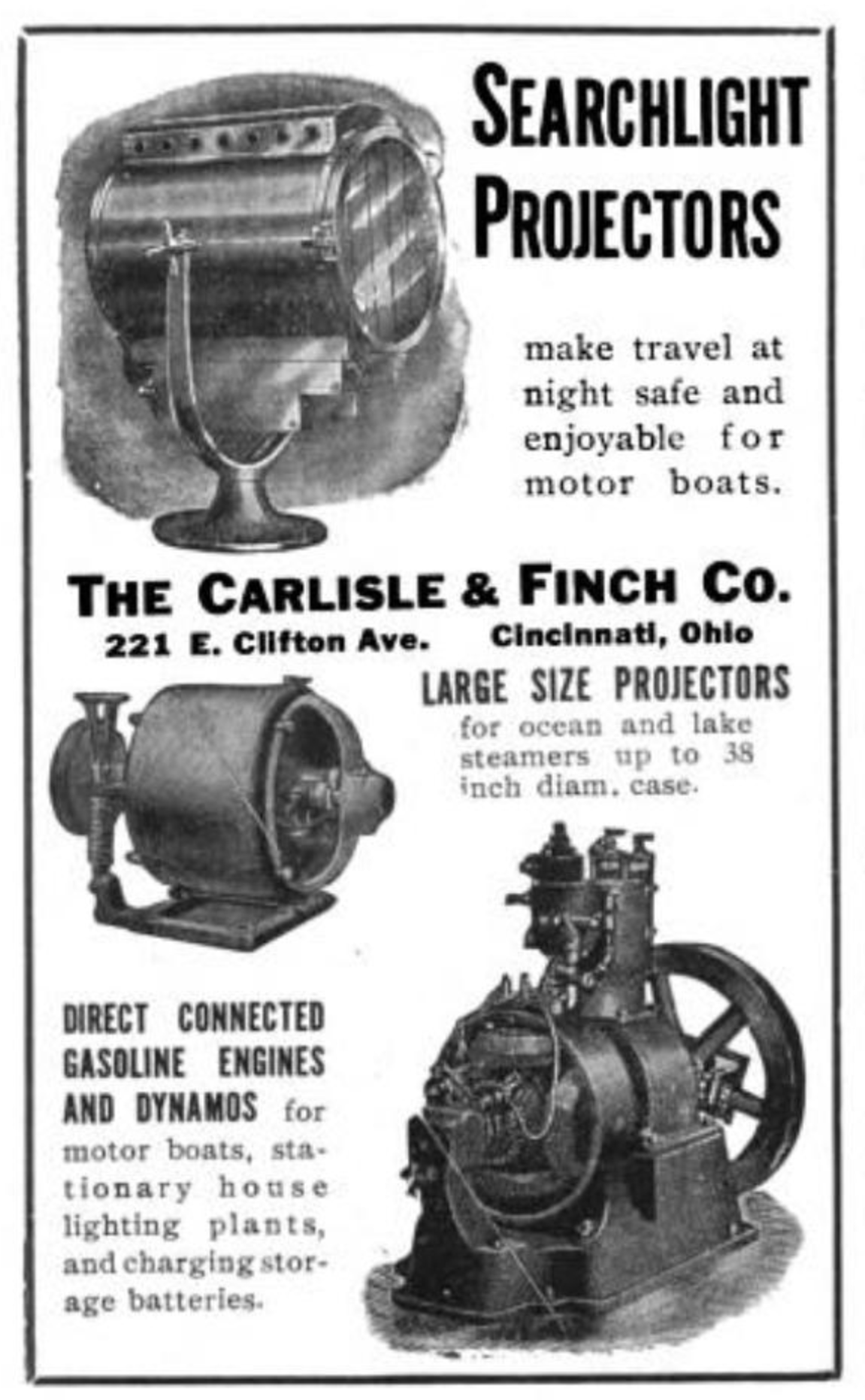
1913: Searchlights and dynamo

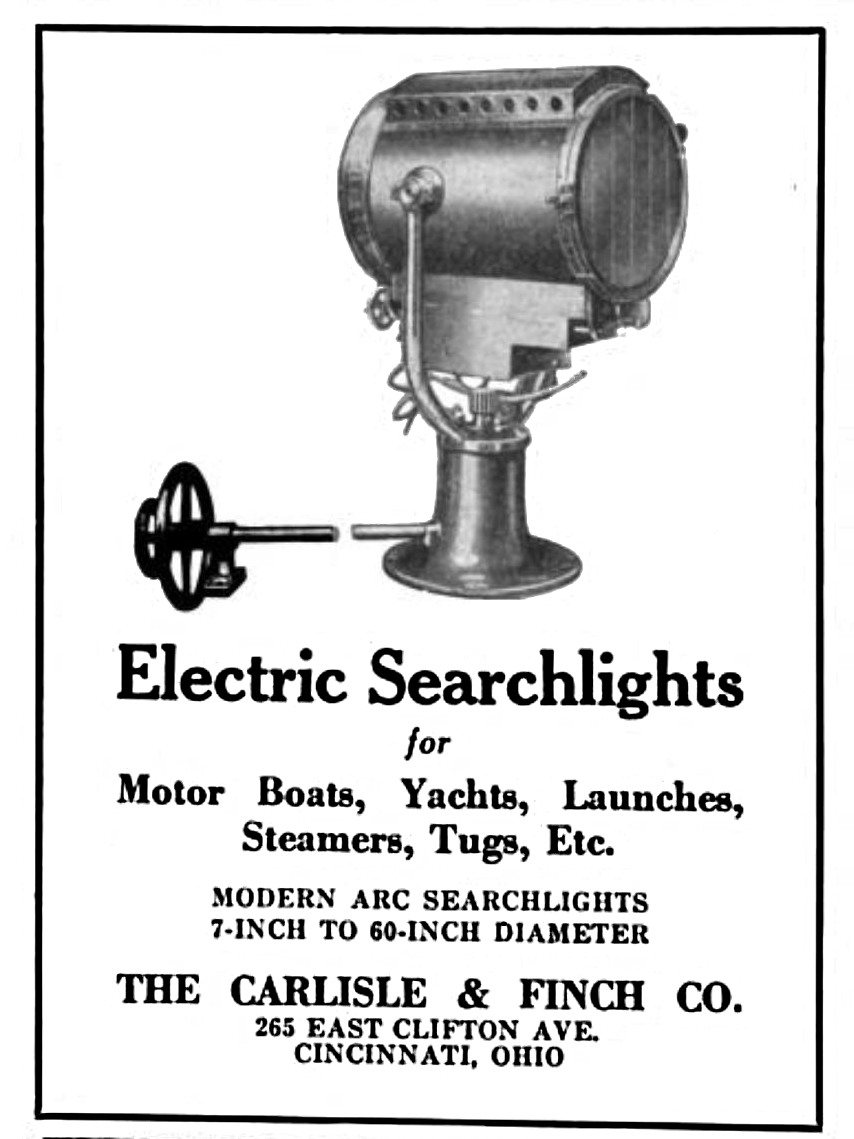
1920: Searchlight

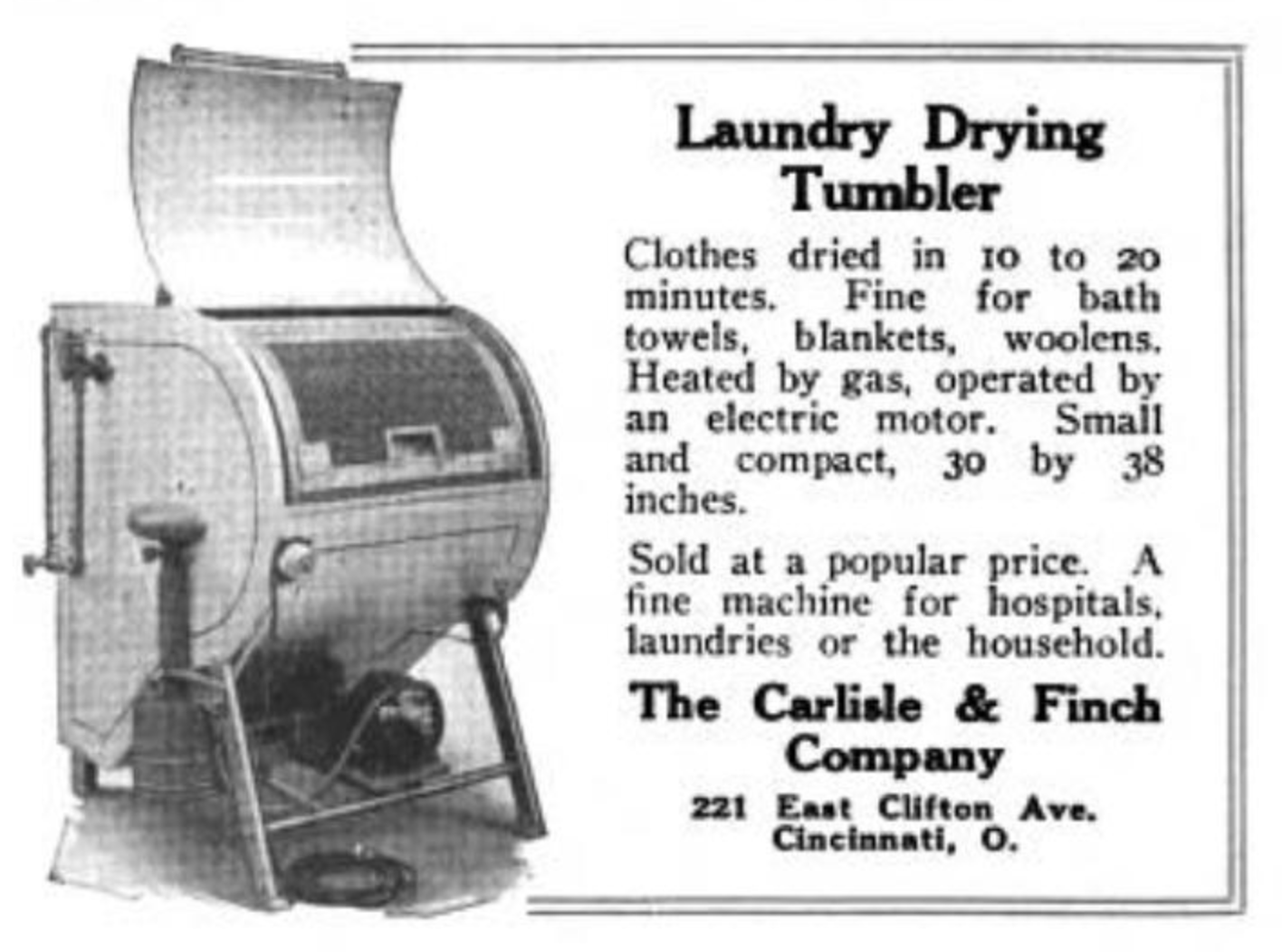
1923: Clothes dryer

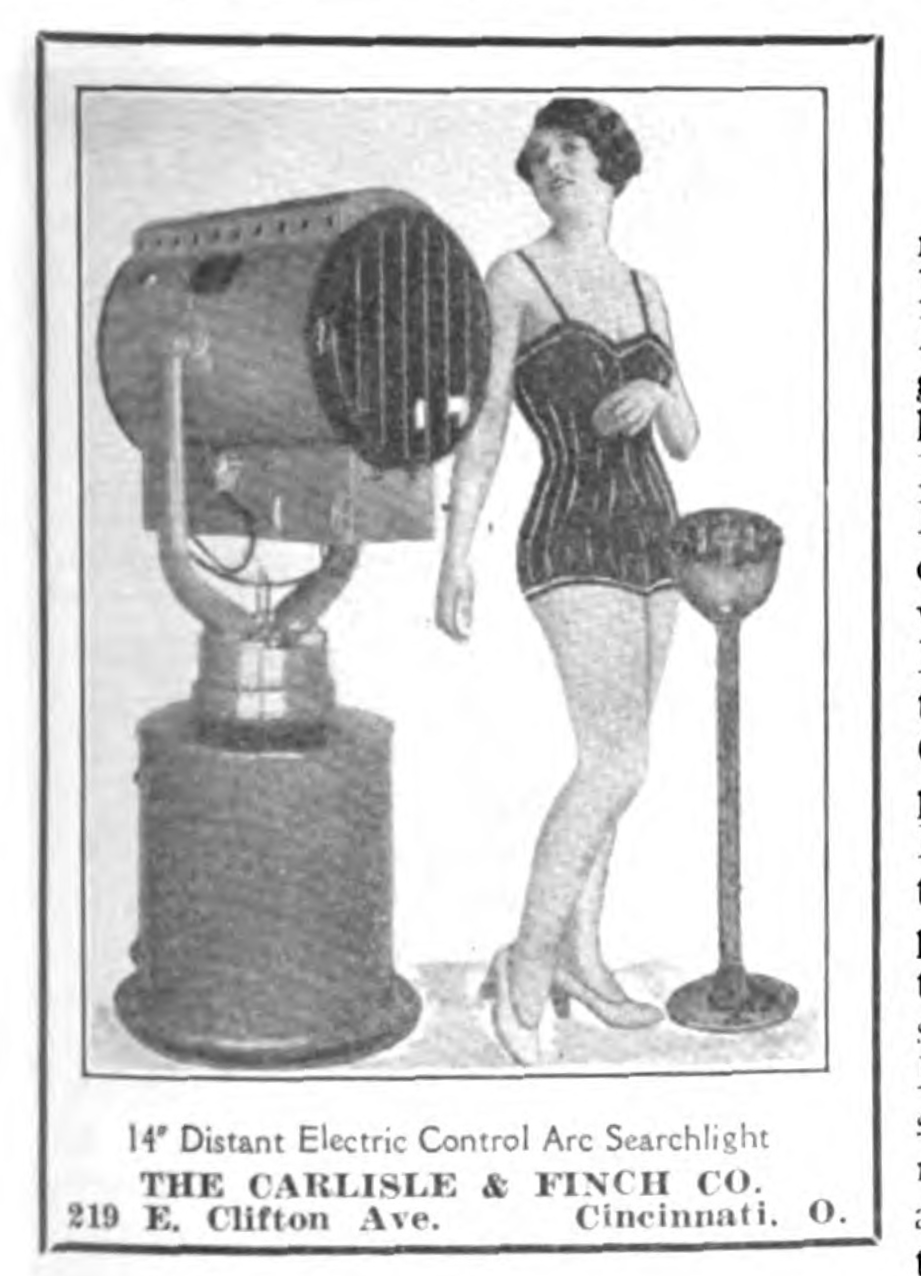
1928: Searchlight

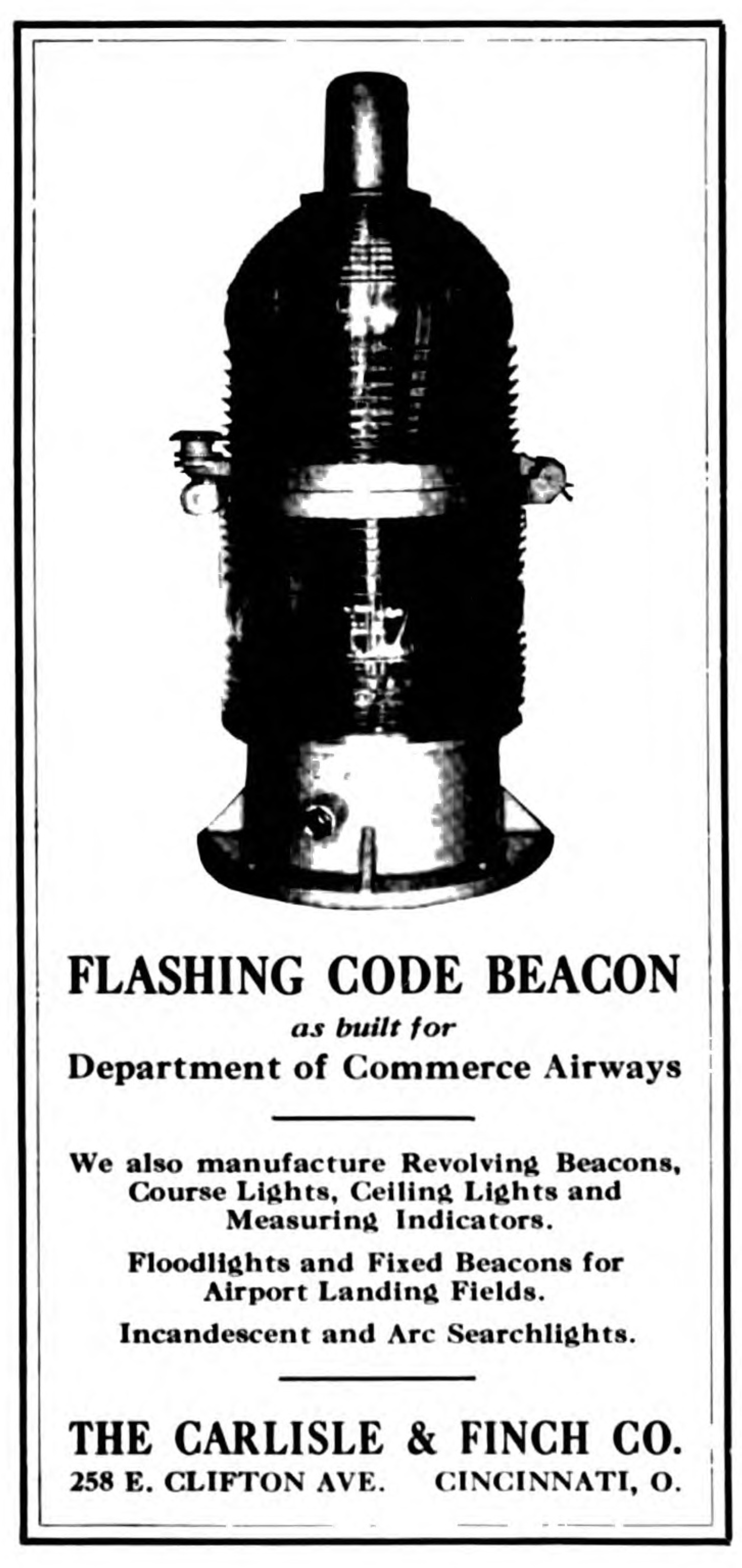
1929: Airway beacon
