= Boucher =

Boucher may refer to:

- Boucher (surname), a family name (including a list of people with that name)
- Boucher Manufacturing Company, an American toy company
- R. v. Boucher, a 1951 Supreme Court of Canada decision that overturned a conviction for seditious libel in criticizing the government
- In re Boucher, a 2007 U.S. criminal case raising the question of compelled production of cryptographic keys
- Boucher (horse), a Thoroughbred racehorse
- Boucher, Québec, a former name of Trois-Rives, Québec

== See also ==
- Boucherville, a city in the Montérégie region in Quebec, Canada
- Longueuil—Pierre-Boucher, a federal electoral district in Québec, Canada
- Havre Boucher, a Canadian village in Antigonish County, Nova Scotia
- Butcher (disambiguation)
