= Voltamp =

Defunct manufacturer of toy trains

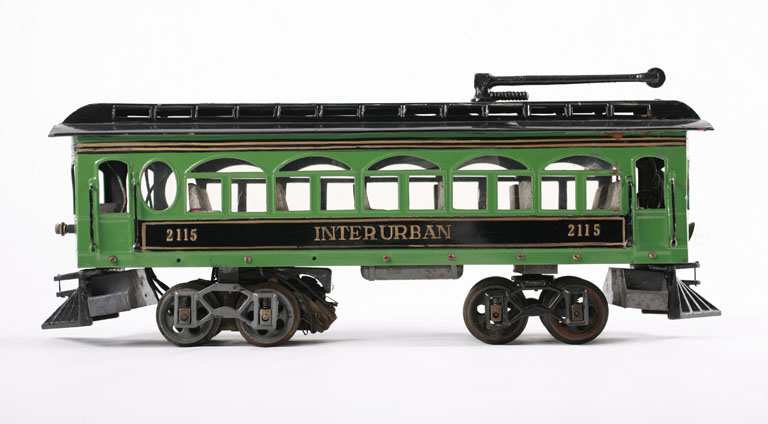
An Interurban 2115 toy train in the permanent collection of The Children's Museum of Indianapolis.

Voltamp was an early American manufacturer of toy trains based in Baltimore, Maryland. Voltamp released its first toy train product in 1903.

== Overview ==
Founded by Manes Fuld (1863–1929), the son of a Baltimore stove dealer, Voltamp's trains utilized the same 2-inch gauge metal track as Carlisle & Finch, the inventor of the electric toy train. It is significant for its 1907 release of the first electric toy train that operated on household alternating current; earlier electric trains had used battery power.

Although Voltamp outlasted Carlisle & Finch, its primary competitor, both companies were eclipsed in the marketplace by the Ives Manufacturing Company and Lionel Corporation, and Voltamp exited the market in 1922, selling its line to Boucher.

== See also ==
- Big Monster Toys
