= James Morrison (Kansas politician) =

American politician

Member of the Kansas House of Representatives from the 121st district
- In office January 11, 1993 – November 25, 2010
- Preceded by: Don Crumbaker
- Succeeded by: Rick Billinger

Personal details
- Born: April 11, 1942 Colby, Kansas, U.S.
- Died: November 25, 2010 (aged 68) Denver, Colorado, U.S.
- Party: Republican
- Spouse: Karen
- Children: 4
- Education: Southern College of Optometry

James Frank "Jim" Morrison (April 11, 1942 – November 25, 2010) was a Republican member of the Kansas House of Representatives, who represented the 121st district. He served from August 4, 1992 until his death on November 25, 2010.

Morrison worked as an optometrist since 1967 and as a broadcast engineer from 1973. He earned a BS and OD from the Southern College of Optometry, in Memphis, Tennessee.

He was a member of the Rotary Club, Fellow American Academy of Optometry, Kansas Optometric Association, and the Lions Club.

== Committee membership ==
- Health and Human Services
- Government Efficiency and Fiscal Oversight (Chair)
- Joint Committee on Information Technology

== Major donors ==
The top 5 donors to Morrison's 2008 campaign:

1. Morrison, Jim $2,772
2. Kansas Contractors Assoc $800
3. Prairie Band Potawatomi Nation $750
4. Koch Industries $500
5. Taylor, Louis $500
