= Southern College of Optometry =

Private college in Memphis, Tennessee, US

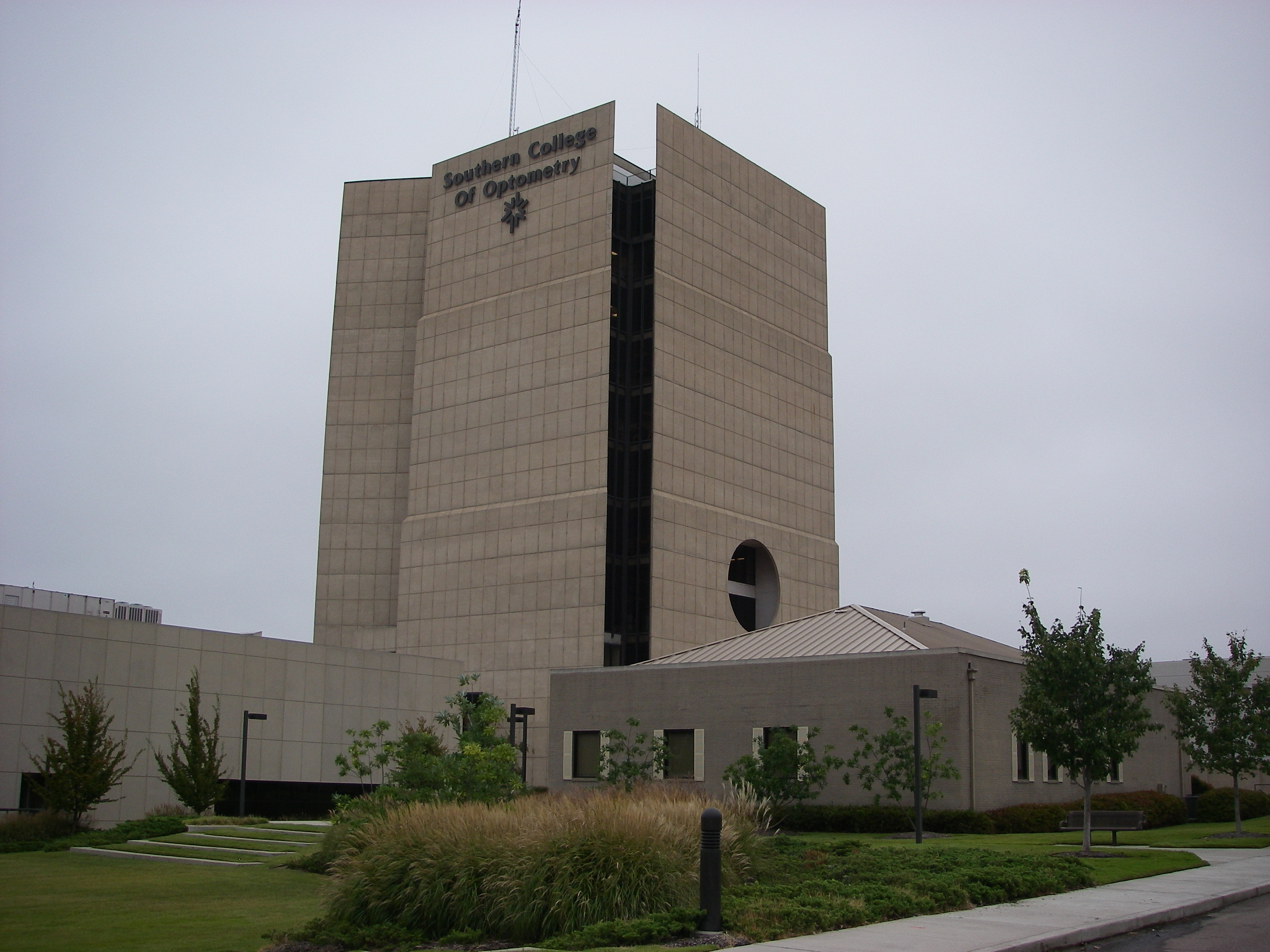
- Motto: "Lux et Veritas (Light and Truth)"
- Type: Private college of optometry
- Established: 1932
- Endowment: $35.7 million
- President: Lewis N. Reich
- Faculty: 53 Full-time (Spring 2022)
- Students: 538 (Spring 2022)
- Location: Memphis, Tennessee, United States; 35.1376°N 90.0205°W
- Website: www.sco.edu

The Southern College of Optometry is a private college in Memphis, Tennessee. It offers programs in optometry.

== History ==
The Southern College of Optometry (SCO) is a private, non-profit educational institution that was established in 1932 by J.J. Horton, an ophthalmologist. Since inception, it has graduated at least six thousand optometrists from multiple states and countries. In 1953, a new clinical facility was opened at its current location, which has since undergone expansions to accommodate administrative offices, classrooms, and a library.

In 1970, SCO moved to its present structure, which includes multimedia classrooms, laboratories, faculty and administrative offices, a library, a student center, a computer learning resource center, and an outpatient clinic called the Eye Institute. The Eye Center at SCO, established in 2002, is a large, free-standing facility spanning 46,000 square feet (4,300 m^{2}). It serves a significant number of patients annually and is recognized as one of the largest eye and vision centers in the United States. The center is equipped with advanced examination rooms, technology-based testing spaces, retinal laser and digital angiography centers, an optical shop, and on-site ophthalmology services.

In 2005, the Hayes Center for Practice Excellence was established.

In 2013, the college finished construction of a multimillion-dollar building, which added classrooms, study areas, and laboratories. In January 2016, Lewis N. Reich became the new president of the college.

== Work ==
The Eye Center at the Southern College of Optometry provides comprehensive care for over 60,000 patients annually, catering to the diagnosis, treatment, and management of eye diseases as well as chronic eye health and visual disorders. It offers a wide range of services, including thorough eye examinations for patients of all ages. As one of the largest facilities of its kind in the United States, it houses 70 fully equipped examination rooms, 14 individual spaces for advanced technology-based testing, a retinal laser center, a digital angiography center, a full-service optical shop, and on-site ophthalmology services.

Functioning similarly to a teaching hospital, The Eye Center serves as a primary healthcare facility, attending to patients primarily from Memphis/Shelby County, West Tennessee, Arkansas, and Mississippi. The center is led by James E. Venable, Vice President for Clinical Programs, and Christopher Lievens, Chief of Staff.

=== Health care services ===
The Eye Center, being a teaching facility, is organized into various service areas, which include:

1. Adult Primary Care Service
2. Pediatric Primary Care Service
3. Cornea and Contact Lens Service
4. Advanced Care Ocular Disease Service
5. Vision Therapy and Rehabilitation Service
6. The Technology Center
7. The Eye Center Optical

== Notable alumni ==
- Gil Morgan, golfer
- Joshua McAdams, runner who ran for the U.S. in the 2008 Summer Olympics
- James Morrison, member of the Kansas House of Representatives
- John Boozman, a senior US senator representing the state of Arkansas
- James A. Boucher, a former US Representative who served Albany County, Wyoming
- Mark Shirey, member of the Alabama House of Representatives

== See also ==
- List of Optometry schools in the world
