= National Toy Train Museum =

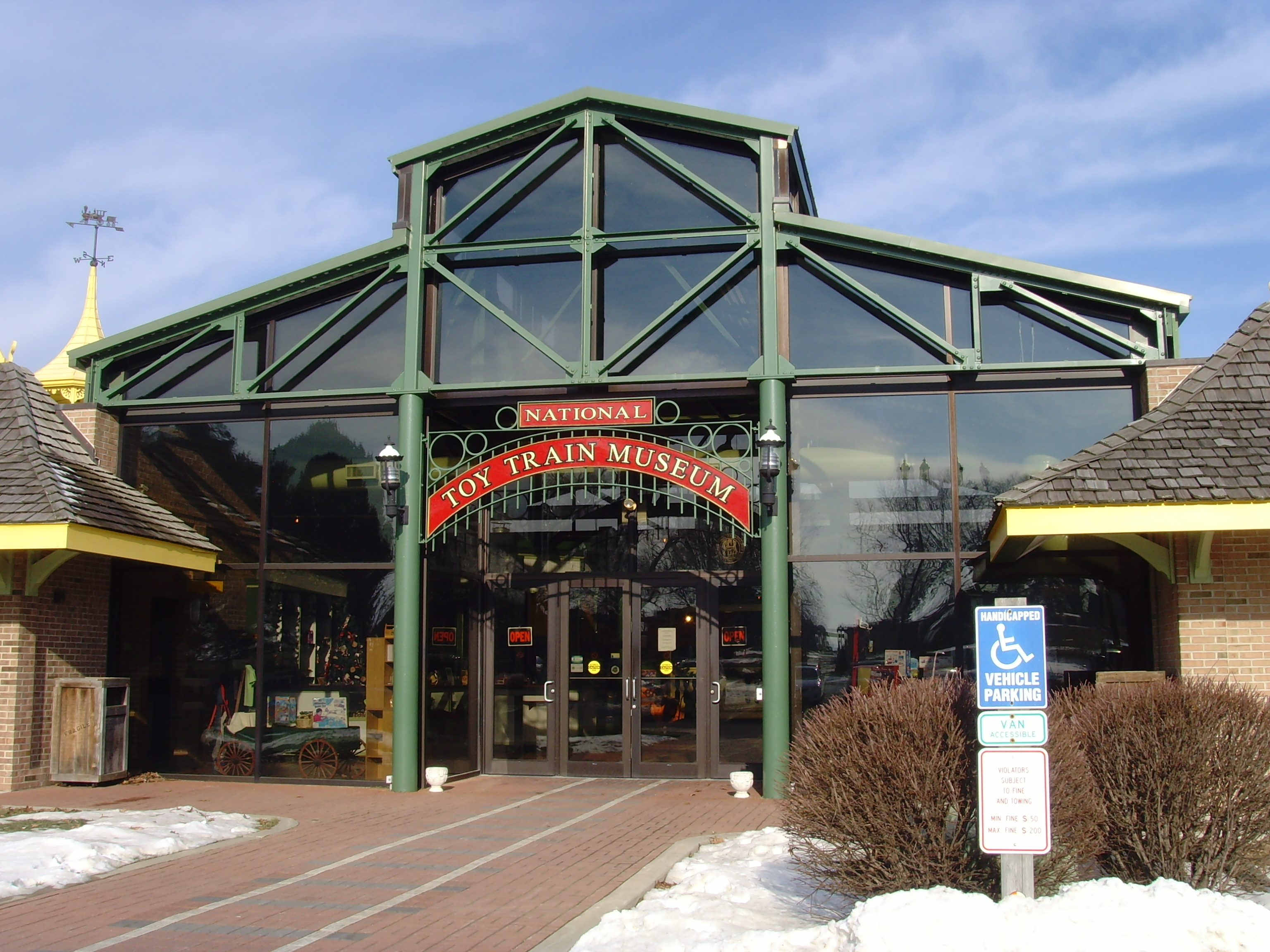
- The museum in 2010
- Established: 1977
- Location: 300 Paradise Lane, Strasburg, Pennsylvania, USA
- Coordinates: 39.9876°N 76.1519°W
- Type: Toy museum
- Visitors: Closed for a brief time each winter. Check the website for details.
- Owner: Train Collectors Association
- Website: www.tcatrains.org/museum/

The National Toy Train Museum (NTTM), at 300 Paradise Lane, in Strasburg, Pennsylvania, USA, is focused on creating an interactive display of toy trains. Its collection dates from the early 1800s through current production. The building houses the Toy Train Reference Library and the National Business Office of the Train Collectors Association. It is located just around the corner from the Railroad Museum of Pennsylvania.

The NTTM is owned and operated by the Train Collectors Association (TCA) and serves as its headquarters. The museum's mission is to promote train collecting and to preserve the heritage of toy trains. Founded in 1977, part of the museum's ongoing appeal is that it brings children and adults together. The museum features Six working train layouts and a Toy Train Reference Library with reference and archival materials serving model railroaders. The nearby Choo Choo Barn "features a more than 1,700-square-foot model train layout with 22 operating model trains and more than 150 animations".

In August 2012, the National Toy Train Museum was one of twenty locations invited to participate in an international virtual celebration of Swiss contributions to railroad technology. The Skype talks, in which engineers, historians, museum curators and other experts presented Swiss trains and other Swiss train technologies and answered questions from the public, were accessible by computer and at the participating locations.

The museum is open for most of the year with an admission fee charged. TCA members are admitted free.

== See also ==
- The Toy Train Depot
