= Boshier =

Boshier is a surname. Notable people with the surname include:

- Brian Boshier (1932–2009), English cricketer
- Derek Boshier (born 1937), English artist
- Lachlan Boshier (born 1994), New Zealand rugby player
- Nicholas Boshier, Australian actor

== See also ==
- David Boshier-Jones, British racing driver
