= Boucher Manufacturing Company =

American Toy Company

The Boucher Manufacturing Company was an American toy company that specialized in toy boats and toy trains. It is best remembered today as the last manufacturer of Standard Gauge/Wide gauge toy trains until the much smaller McCoy Manufacturing revived the old standard in the mid-1960s.

Boucher entered the toy train business in 1922 with its purchase of the Voltamp line of trains. Voltamp had been a direct competitor to Carlisle & Finch, the inventor of the electric toy train. Boucher modified the Voltamp trains from Carlisle & Finch's 2-inch (51 mm) gauge to match Lionel Corporation's 2 1/8 in (53.975 mm) Standard gauge. The Voltamp/Boucher offerings were highly accurate and detailed and occupied the premium end of the market.

For the duration of Boucher's life the market was dominated by the so-called "Big Four" of Lionel, Ives, Dorfan, and American Flyer. Like all of them, Boucher struggled through the Great Depression, and while it outlived all but Lionel, by 1940 the 2 1/8-inch Standard gauge had become an orphan standard that was priced beyond the means of most consumers. Without a smaller, more affordable product to sell, and with World War II limiting what it could produce, Boucher went out of business in 1943.
