= John William Boucher =

Civil War and WW I veteran (1844-1939)

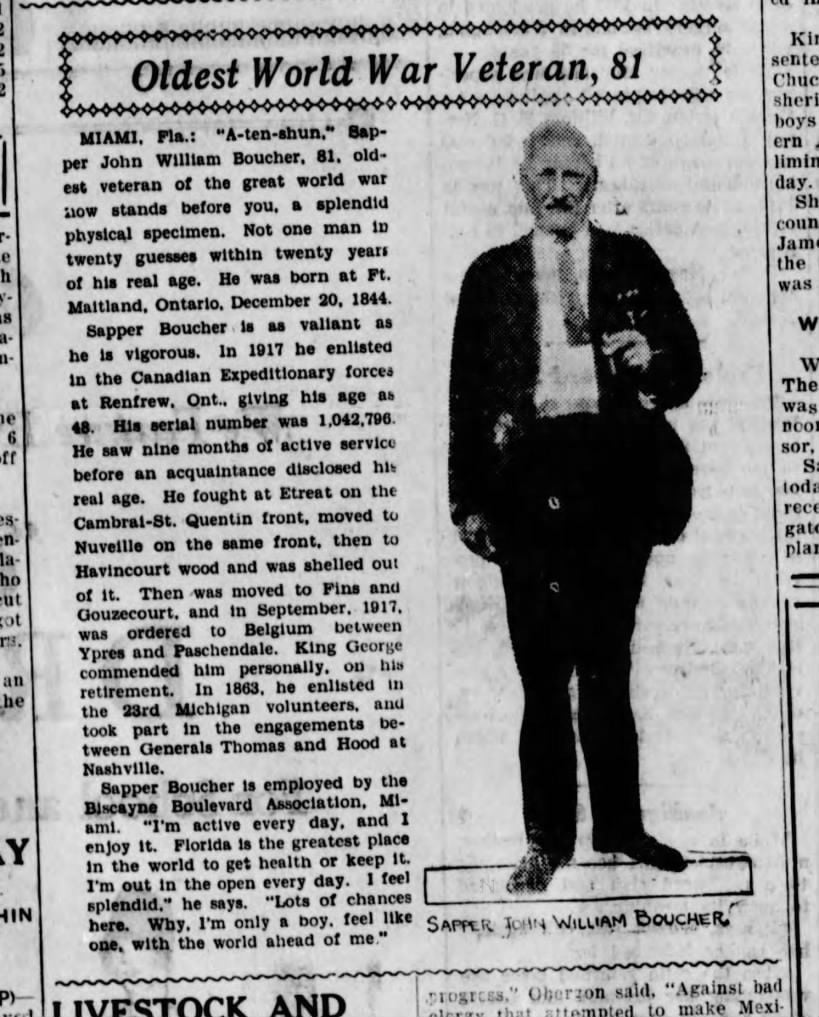
- John William Boucher in 1927
- Born: December 20, 1844; Port Maitland, Ontario, Canada
- Died: February 27, 1939 (aged 94); Miami, Florida, United States
- Military career
- Service years: 1861–1864, 1917–1918
- Units: Company U, Michigan 24th Infantry Regiment, 25th Michigan Regiment and the Canadian Engineers, Sapper Canadian Army CEF
- Conflicts: American Civil War; Battle of Nashville; World War I

John William Boucher (December 20, 1844 – February 27, 1939) was a Canadian-American American Civil War veteran and one of only two Civil War veterans to fight in World War I, with the other being Peter Conover Hains.

== Early life ==
Boucher was born in Ontario, British Canada. When John's father died in 1850, he was sent to a boarding school near the Canada–United States border.

== Civil War ==
When the American Civil War broke out in 1861, Boucher sneaked into Michigan and enlisted in Detroit and was mustered into Company U of the Michigan 24th Infantry Regiment in September 1864. He was transferred to the 25th Michigan Regiment and fought in the Battle of Nashville in Tennessee. Boucher was discharged on October 26, 1864, in Jackson, Michigan.

== Post Civil War ==
Following his service in Michigan, Boucher moved back to Canada and started a family and worked various odd jobs including as a surveyor, baggageman and freight conductor for multiple railroads, carriage factory worker in Gananoque, Ontario, a guide for the St. Lawrence River. Boucher's wife died in 1898, while visiting St. Louis, Missouri, leaving John a widow when he was 54 years old.

== World War I ==
By the time World War I broke out, Boucher was 69 and by the time Boucher began to think about enlisting, he was 72. In January 1917, Boucher passed the physical exam, stated that he was 48 years old, and became a sapper. Boucher served on the Western Front for only a few months before his true age was discovered by Red Cross personnel and he was discharged.

== Later years ==
When Boucher's story became known to the press, he was hailed across England, Canada and the United States as a hero and Boucher was personally invited to Buckingham Palace and spoke with King George V. Upon his return to North America, he began to go on tour across the Eastern and Southern United States to raise American support for the war. In 1919, Syracuse, New York and joined the American Legion. In 1920, he became an official U.S. citizen and on February 27, 1939, Boucher died while visiting Miami, Florida for the winter.
