= Charles Boucher =

Charles Boucher may refer to:

- Charles Boucher (priest) (1856–1940), Anglican priest
- Charles Eugene Boucher (1864–1926), Canadian politician
- Charles Hamilton Boucher (1898–1951), British Indian Army officer
