= David Bouchier =

British-American essayist

David Bouchier (born 1939) is a British-American essayist and journalist known for his radio essays on NPR, his humor column in the New York Times, and his literary social commentaries.

== Biography ==
Before enrolling in college, Bouchier spent 12 years working as a journalist for London newspapers and doing freelance interviews for a BBC program. He then specialized in American studies at the University of Essex. He went on to complete his doctorate in sociology at the London School of Economics, studying America's radical politics of the 1960's. He moved to the United States in 1986 and taught at State University of New York at Stony Brook and other institutions. He contributed regularly to NPR's "Morning Edition" and "Radio Pages".

Bouchier wrote a humor column for the Long Island section of The New York Times for 10 years. His radio essays and columns have received Press Club awards. He taught at the University of Iowa Summer Writing Festival. He hosted a classical music program on NPR stations, called "Sunday Matinee", which was described as "quirky". He now works for WSHU Public Radio.

== Critical reception ==
Bouchier's book Idealism and Revolution was largely panned except for its final chapter, which focused on alienation, the end of scarcity, and the impact of consciousness on social change. The Feminist Challenge was commended for delineating how British feminism focused more on class-based issues than American feminism, and for its analysis of the organizational styles of both movements. Bouchier's commentaries on suburban life, politics, foreign travel, and technology have been described as lightening an otherwise curmudgeonly tone with whimsy and genuine openness to change. His memoir An Unexpected Life was commended for Bouchier's ability to guide the reader from an apparently pedestrian remark to a significant social commentary. While Kirkus Reviews praised Dark Matters for Bouchier's writing about the failure of modernity as showing "great passion and elegance", the reviewer took issue with Bouchier's views on religion. Bouchier often quotes David Hume, Mark Twain, George Orwell, Alexis de Tocqueville, Greek and Roman philosophers.

== Bibliography ==
- Out of Order: More Irregular Essays from Public Radio (2021) ISBN 978-1643886503
- Journal of the Eightieth Year: The Five Seasons (2020) ISBN 1684741289
- Dark Matters: Delusions, Illusions, Lost Causes and Absurdities in Modern America (2019) ISBN 978-1684710256
- An Unexpected Life (2018) ISBN 978-1579625191
- Not Quite a Stranger: Essays on Life in France (2015) ISBN 1517543746
- A Few Well Chosen Words: More Wit and Wisdom from Public Radio (2008) ISBN 978-1440105128
- Writer at Work: Reflections on the Art and Business of Writing (2005) ISBN 0595351832
- The Song of Suburbia: Scenes from Suburban Life (2002) ISBN 9780965247528
- Composers (1999) ISBN 9780761112068
- The Accidental Immigrant: America Observed (1997) ISBN 9780965247504
- Radical Citizenship: The New American Activism (1987) ISBN 9780805240313
- The Feminist Challenge : The Movement for Women's Liberation in Britain and the USA (1983) ISBN 9780805238815
- Idealism and Revolution: New Ideologies of Liberation in Britain and the United States (1979) ISBN 9780312404390
