= Robert Boucher =

Robert, Bob or Bobby Boucher may refer to:

- Bob Boucher (educator) (1940–2009), British academic and vice-chancellor of the University of Sheffield from 2001 to 2007
- Bob Boucher (cyclist) (born 1943), Canadian cyclist and speed skater
- Bob Boucher (ice hockey) (1938–2004), Canadian ice hockey player and coach
- Robert Boucher (ice hockey) (1904–1931), Canadian ice hockey player who played for the Montreal Canadiens
- Bobby Boucher, a character played by Adam Sandler in The Waterboy
