= Jim Boucher =

Indigenous Canadian businessman and politician (born 1956)

Jim Boucher AOE
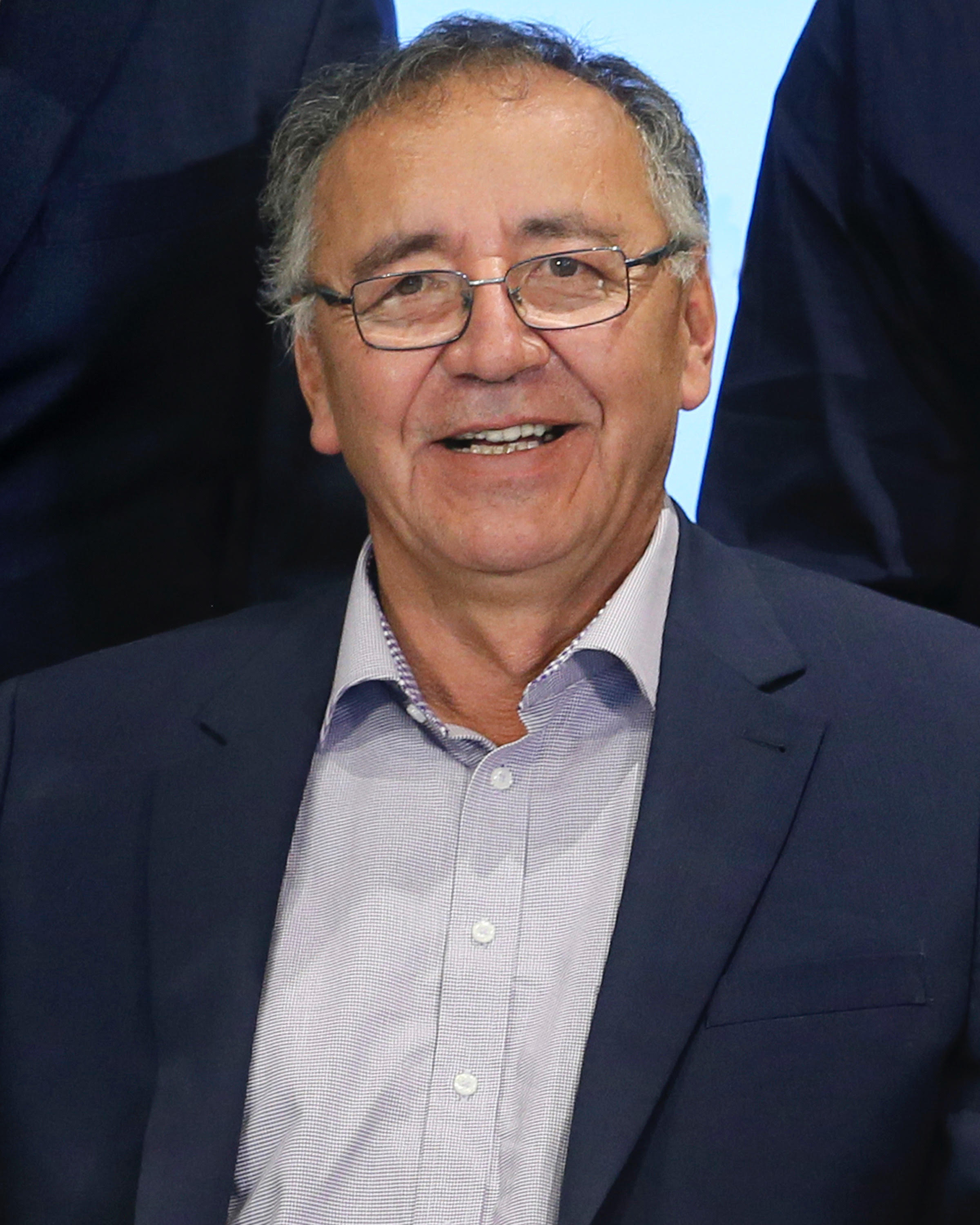
- Boucher in 2017
- Born: February 29, 1956 (age 70); Fort McKay, Alberta, Canada
- Occupations: Investor, businessman
- Years active: 1986–2019
- Predecessor: Dorothy MacDonald
- Parent(s): Theodore and Eva Boucher

Jim Boucher AOE (/buːˈʃeɪ/ boo-SHAY; born February 29, 1956) is a Cree and Dene Indigenous Canadian businessman and political leader. As an elected chief, he represented the Fort McKay First Nation (FMFN), (1986–1994, 1996–2019). He established the Fort McKay Group of Companies in 1986, and continued to be chairman and president of the Fort McKay Group of Companies (1986–2019), president of the Athabasca Tribal Council (ATC), grand chief of Treaty 8 First Nations of Alberta, vice-chairperson, Board of Governors of Keyano College in Fort McMurray, Alberta, and chairperson for the National Aboriginal Economic Development Board.

== Personal life ==
Boucher was born in Fort McKay, Alberta in 1956 to Theodore Boucher(1923-1992) and Eva Boucher(1934-1969). His first languages were Cree and Dene. Both of his parents lived off the land and earned a livelihood trapping and he lived on the trap line until he was of school age. He is a direct descendant of Headman Adam Boucher, who signed Treaty 8 on August 4, 1899. In his youth he attended the Blue Quills Indian Residential School, part of the Canadian Indian residential school system, located in St. Paul, Alberta. It was run by Catholic Oblate priests and Grey Nuns. Boucher has two children and five grandchildren.

== Political career ==
The Fort McKay First Nation is situated in the heart of Canada's Athabasca oil sands and is surrounded by industrial development. As a young chief in the mid-1980s, Boucher recognized that the Fort McKay First Nation community's location not only posed issues, but also offered opportunities. As a result, he has strategically taken advantage of Fort McKay's geographical location to enhance the community's social and economic conditions through effective partnerships with industry and governments and by developing and sustaining successful First Nation-owned businesses that create economic wealth and opportunity.

In 1986, the Fort McKay First Nation came together and decided to form a corporation called the Fort McKay Group of Companies (FMGOC) and begin providing services to the oil industry as a way to provide employment opportunities to their people and generate revenue. Boucher was the Chairman of the Board of the FMGOC from 1986 to 2019. The FMGOC operates three limited companies, 100% owned and controlled by the Fort McKay First Nation. Under Boucher's leadership, the FMGOC has grown into one of the most successful First Nation-owned business ventures in Canada. It earned an average gross annual revenue of $506 million in the five-year period from 2012 to 2016. FMFN has created over 13 joint ventures. According to Statistics Canada, Fort McKay First Nation had an average after-tax income of $73,571 in 2015, which was higher than both the Alberta average ($50,683) and Canada average ($38,977). [5] Under Jim Boucher's leadership, FMFN is recognized as one of Canada's most enterprising aboriginal communities.[6]

Boucher negotiated the Fort McKay's Treaty Land Settlement Agreement in 2003. His strategic and conciliatory approach to this important matter reduced the amount of time it took to negotiate and finalize the Settlement. Boucher also worked in cooperation with other First Nations communities to develop the First Nations Commercial and Industrial Development Act. It was introduced in the House of Commons of Canada on November 2, 2005, and came into force on April 1, 2006. This legislation was needed to close the regulatory gap on reserves and allow complex commercial and industrial projects to proceed. Boucher has also contributed his insights to many publications, including an article for the Canadian Heavy Oil Association in 2011, in recognition of their 25th anniversary.

On April 19, 2006, Shell Canada Limited and Fort McKay First Nation announced that they had entered into an agreement that outlines an exchange of options to acquire oil sands leases, specifically Shell’s Lease 90 and Fort McKay oil sands lands received as part of its land claim and resources rights settlement with Ottawa in 2003. "This innovative agreement recognizes the right and interest of Fort McKay First Nation to commercialize land received under its treaty land claim settlement by leasing it to Shell for potential incorporation into the Athabasca Oil Sands Project, and receiving royalty payments on production."

In 2017, FMFN invested a combined $503 million to become owners of a 49 per cent stake in a Suncor Energy bitumen storage facility at their operations near Fort McMurray. [3]. It represented the largest business investment to date by a First Nations entity in Canada. [4] The bond market was a crucial part of the solution. "The purchase was financed with a $545 million bond issue carrying a 4.14% coupon due in 2041, the largest debt offering to date by an Indigenous group in Canada."

Jim Boucher is an advocate for environmental protection. Under his leadership, FMFN was instrumental in the development of the Moose Lake Access Management Plan. "The plan, once finalized, will set resource development management requirements for crown land within the 10 km management zone, an area that neighbours the Moose Lake Reserves 174A and 174B."

== Awards and recognition ==
Boucher has received many awards and honours throughout his career.

In 2023, Boucher was inducted into the Canadian Business Hall of Fame

In 2020, Boucher was invested into the Alberta Order of Excellence. The Order recognizes those who have made an outstanding provincial, national or international impact, and is the highest honour a citizen can receive as an official part of the Canadian Honours System.

In 2018, Boucher was named the Canadian Energy Person of the Year by the Energy Council of Canada. The Energy Council says "Chief Jim Boucher has been, and continues to be, one of the most influential people in Canada, and one of its most successful Indigenous leaders."

In 2018, Fort McKay First Nation and Fort McKay Group of Companies were the recipients of the Aboriginal Economic Development Corporation of the Year, awarded by the Canadian Council for Aboriginal Business (CCAB). In 2009, Jim Boucher also received the Aboriginal Business Award for Lifetime Achievement from the CCAB.

In 2017, Boucher was named one of The Power 50 - The 50 Most Influential Canadian Business Leaders by The Globe and Mail.

In 2017, Boucher received a Builder of Wood Buffalo Award

2016, Boucher received a Commendation from the Governor General for Outstanding Service. During the peak of the wildfires, the Fort McKay First Nation community welcomed about 5,000 evacuees and provided them with food and temporary shelters in their homes, community centres, schools and in their community-owned camps in the territory.

Boucher received the Regional Municipality of Wood Buffalo's Award for Achievement in Public Service

2009, Aboriginal Business Award for Lifetime Achievement from the Canadian Council for Aboriginal Business

2008, Boucher received a Regional Aboriginal Recognition Award (R.A.R.A.) Lifetime Achievement Award

2008, Indspire Award Laureate in 2008

2003, Recognized as one of the 50 most influential people in Alberta by Venture Magazine

2002, Celebrating Excellence Distinguished Achievement Provincial Award from the Public Institutes of Alberta

1998, Regional Aboriginal Recognition Award (R.A.R.A.) Leadership Achievement Award

== Philanthropy ==
Boucher established the Chief Jim Boucher Distinguished Alumnus Award and the Chief Jim Boucher Ministerial Award of Excellence at Keyano College

In 2017, Boucher lead the Fort McKay First Nation and its business partners in a donation of $550,000 to the Northern Lights Health Foundation’s Gratitude Campaign. "The $16 million Gratitude Campaign is the most ambitious fundraising campaign in the foundation’s history with the goal of bringing world-class health care to Wood Buffalo."
