= Train Collectors Association =

Train Collectors Association (TCA)
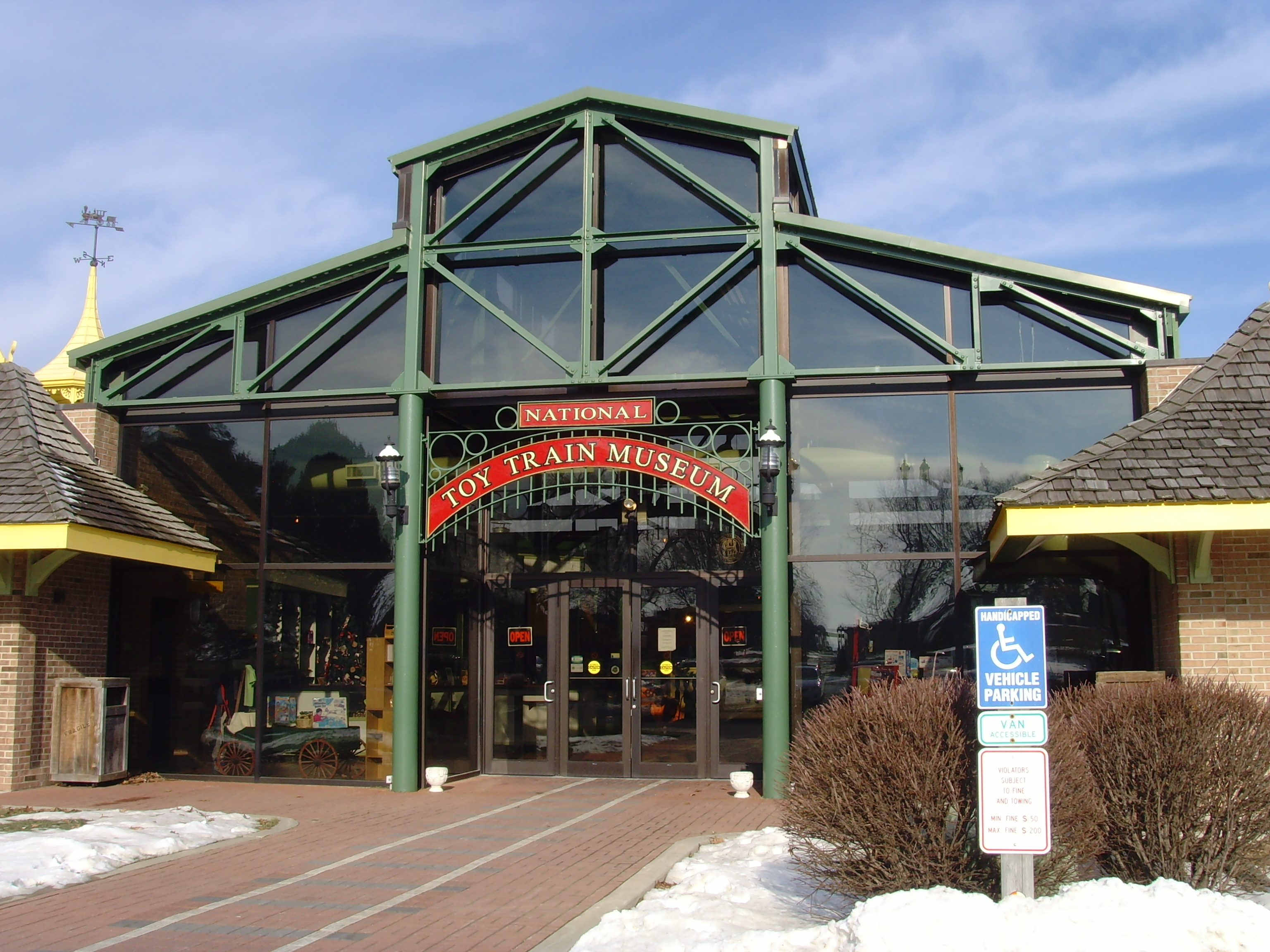
- TCA building in 2010 (Business Office, National Toy Train Museum, National Toy Train Library)
- Established: 1954
- Location: 300 Paradise Lane, Ronks, Pennsylvania. 17572, just outside Strasburg, United States
- Coordinates: 39.9876°N 76.1519°W
- Type: Collecting and Operating of Toy Trains
- Collection size: Vintage and modern toy trains and accessories, operating layouts in different gauges, and research library.
- Visitors: National Business Office open Monday to Friday, 8:30 AM to 4:30 PM
- Presidents: Harold Shapiro, 2026–2028
- Owner: Train Collectors Association
- Website: www.tcatrains.org

The Train Collectors Association (TCA) is an international non-profit organization of people who operate and collect toy trains, toy train accessories, toy train books, toy train paper, and anything else rail transport related. TCA was founded in October 1954 in Yardley, Pennsylvania and is currently headquartered in Strasburg, Pennsylvania. The National Toy Train Museum affiliated with TCA is included in the "List of museums in Pennsylvania".

== Museum and library operations ==
TCA owns and operates the National Toy Train Museum (NTTM) and the National Toy Train Library (NTTL) which are located at 300 Paradise Lane, Strasburg, Pennsylvania.

== Gauges and manufacturers ==
All gauges (scales) of trains are collected and operated by members. Partiality for a particular gauge is a personal preference of each member. These gauges include HO gauge, S gauge, O gauge/O scale, G gauge/G scale, Standard Gauge, 1 gauge, and 2 gauge.

Other small gauges (less than 1:148) include N gauge, T gauge, TT gauge. and Z gauge.

In addition, all manufacturers are collected and operated by members. Again, partiality for a particular manufacturer is at the preference of each member. Manufacturers doing business in today's market include Lionel; MTH; Weaver; Williams; American Models; Atlas; Bachmann; Kato; and Walthers. Vintage manufacturers include Lionel Corporation, Ives, K-Line, Forney, Beggs, Bing, Bassett-Lowke, American Flyer (Lionel is now producing American Flyer), Marx, McCoy, Voltamp, Dorfan, Fandor, Howard, and many others. There are more than 300 different manufacturers many of whom have items on display at the NTTM.

== Standards ==
Standards for condition and grading have been developed by TCA that are widely accepted by individuals, websites, and auction houses. These include condition codes for original trains, for train paper, for restored trains, and for reproduction trains. These condition standards, together with the rarity of the item, will help to determine the dollar value and the collectability of a particular train or accessory.

== Publications ==
TCA issues three publications during the year, the Train Collector Quarterly (a magazine dedicated to tinplate and contemporary trains), the National Headquarters News (listing of the monthly Chapter and Division meets as well as other information), and the e*Train(an online magazine). Other organizations reference TCA and the York Meet in their publications and websites. Examples are Collectors Weekly, the Toy Train Paper and Memorabilia Group and Tandem Associates.

== Education ==
Divisions and Chapters of TCA host local train meets or train shows on a schedule throughout the United States where members may buy, sell, trade trains, or just enjoy the fellowship of collecting. Most shows are open to the public and may include educational segments, kids activities, and train doctors who can repair trains.

The most prominent show, the York Train Meet, sponsored by the Eastern Division of TCA, is held over a three-day period twice a year in April and October in York, Pennsylvania. This show has 2000 tables of trains, large operating train layouts, and is open to TCA members and their guests. Some local divisions and chapters assist the Boy Scouts of America with the Railroading Merit Badge.
