= James A. Boucher =

American politician (1937–2020)

Member of the Wyoming House of Representatives
- In office 1975–1976

Personal details
- Born: March 27, 1937
- Died: September 20, 2020 (aged 83)
- Spouse: Marty Uhlmann
- Children: 6
- Education: Ohio Wesleyan University; Southern College of Optometry

James A. Boucher (March 27, 1937 – September 20, 2020) was an American politician. He served as a member of the Wyoming House of Representatives.

== Life and career ==
Boucher was raised in Wauseon, Ohio, the son of Marion and Harold Boucher. He attended Ohio Wesleyan University and Southern College of Optometry. He served in the United States Air Force.

In 1975, Boucher was elected to the Wyoming House of Representatives, representing Albany County, Wyoming, serving until 1976.

Boucher died in September 2020, at the age of 83.
