= David Boucher (political scientist) =

Welsh political theorist and academic

Professor David Boucher FRHistS FAcSS FLSW
- Occupations: Political theorist and philosopher

Academic background
- Education: University of Wales; The London School of Economics; The University of Liverpool

David Ewart George Boucher FRHistS FAcSS FLSW (born 15 October 1951, Ebbw Vale, Wales) is a Welsh political theorist and philosopher of international relations.

Boucher is a professor at Cardiff University and a distinguished visiting professor at University of Johannesburg. He was vice-president (arts, humanities and social sciences) of The Learned Society of Wales from 2017 to 2020, and is chairman of the trustees of the Collingwood Society.

Boucher is a fellow of the Royal Historical Society, the Academy of Social Sciences and the Learned Society of Wales.

== Biography ==
Boucher was born in Ebbw Vale, Wales, in 1951. He studied politics at Swansea University, the London School of Economics and Liverpool University before appointment to a tutorial fellowship at Cardiff University in 1980. He then worked at La Trobe University, Melbourne, and The Australian National University in Canberra, before returning to the United Kingdom to take up a senior lectureship at Swansea University in 1991.

In 2000, Boucher became a professorial fellow at Cardiff University, and the university's first dean of the Graduate School in Humanities. He was head of the School of European Studies; acting head of the Centre for Continuing Adult Education; and deputy pro-vice chancellor for staffing and diversity.

Boucher has been chairman of the trustees of the R. G. Collingwood Society since 1993, and is the executive editor of its journal British Idealism and Collingwood Studies. He has held fellowships at The History of Ideas Unit, Australian National University; Christchurch University, Canterbury, New Zealand; Sun Yat Sen University, Taiwan; and is a distinguished visiting professor, University of Johannesburg, South Africa (2016–2026).

== Research and work ==
=== Methodology, hermeneutics and the history of political thought ===
From the late 1960s the study of political thought in the Anglo-American tradition became self-reflective in demanding a greater methodological self-awareness. This self-awareness drew very heavily on the work of continental hermeneutic theorists such as Wilhelm Dilthey, Hans-Georg Gadamer and Paul Ricoeur. Historian such as W. H. Greenleaf, Quentin Skinner and J. G. A. Pocock attempted to impose upon the discipline a preferred method of inquiry which excluded the intrusion of present philosophical, practical and moral considerations into an historical inquiry.

Boucher wrote a number of articles criticising such legislative enactments culminating in the first book to give a comprehensive consideration to the sources of their arguments, their logical form and the practicality of their implementation. In Texts in Context Boucher argued that methodological pluralism acted as a brake upon the excesses of idiosyncrasy, and ensured the continuance of a healthy methodological self-awareness.

Boucher's most recent book, Appropriating Hobbes: Legacies in Politics, Law and International Relations (OUP, 2018) begins with a justification of the approach taken in the book, focusing upon hermeneutics and particularly the concept of distanciation, incorporating Reinhart Koselleck's distinction between the space of experience and the horizon of expectation. He argues that Hobbes's texts do not stand independently of interpretation, and that each appropriation is a rewriting of the arguments sustained with different patterns of evidence, constrained by the conventions and settled norms of scholarship that enable people to differentiate between fiction and evidentially supported argument. Boucher and Paul Kelly have edited Political Thinkers: From Socrates to the Present.

=== R. G. Collingwood and European Civilisation ===
Boucher's book The Social and Political Thought of R. G. Collingwood discusses R.G. Collingwood's philosophy of European Civilisation. Collingwood's distinctive contribution was to challenge the conventional distinction generally accepted between savagery, barbarism and civilisation. Barbarism was for him a reaction against civilisation.

Collingwood showed that the civilising process has three aspects: the elimination of force in relation to one's fellow members of the body politic, between members of different bodies politic, and between humans and nature. The implications Boucher discussed in a number of articles, including The British Journal of Politics and International Relations (2000), "Collingwood, Tocqueville and the expansion of the moral community".

When Sir Malcolm Knox edited Collingwood's The Idea of History in 1946 he effectively prohibited the further publication of manuscript material, a prohibition to which Collingwood's widow and daughter strictly adhered. In 1989, Boucher was the first person to be granted permission to publish manuscript material from Collingwood's unpublished papers since Sir Malcolm Knox. Essays in Political Philosophy includes extracts from the manuscripts. Boucher has since edited a revised version of Collingwood's The New Leviathan; The Philosophy of Enchantment (with Wendy James and Philip Smallwood); and An Autobiography (with Collingwood's daughter, Teresa Smith). Fred Inglis, the author of History Man: The Life of R. G. Collingwood maintains: "Boucher's own dutiful fidelity makes an indispensable link in the very survival of the social history of a philosopher's thought."

=== British idealist political thought ===
Boucher has from the start maintained an interest in British Idealist political thought which derives its main sources of inspiration from continental Europe. Boucher has published articles on many aspects of British Idealism in such Journals as Storia, History and Theory, Australian Journal of Political Science, Journal of the History of Ideas, History of Political Thought, New Literary History, and edited The British Idealists for Cambridge University Press.

Boucher jointly authored two further books with Andrew Vincent, British Idealism and Political Theory (Edinburgh University Press, 2000), and The British Idealists: A Guide for the Perplexed (Continuum, 2011) in which they argued that Idealism is a living philosophy with contributions to be made to contemporary issues.

Through his establishment of the Collingwood and British Idealism Centre in Cardiff with Andrew Vincent and Bruce Haddock, he has, with others contributed to the rehabilitation of British Idealism into mainstream philosophy and history of ideas.

=== Political theory of international relations ===
In this field of study, Boucher's main contribution is to argue that the categories of Realism and Idealism, and Cosmopolitanism and Communitarianism, are inadequate for conceptualising the whole of the history of international relations theories.

In Political Theories of International Relations from Thucydides to the Present Boucher suggests that alternative categories are contrived and unable to explain away elements which belong in other traditions. He argues that the history of this subject is best seen in terms of three related categories, Political Realism, Universal Moral Order, and Historical Morality. The elements of all three appear in the works of great writers as they try to come to terms with the standard issues relating to the universal obligations of men and women, and the obligations of citizens to each other. He developed these arguments in published form in relation to Hobbes and Burke, and more generally in trying to conceptualise the whole of the history of international relations thought from Thucydides to the present with reference to such thinkers as Vitoria, Pufendorf and Kant.

One of the traditions, Universal Moral Order, was explored in more depth in The Limits of Ethics in International Relations.In it Boucher argued that universal principles almost invariable entail qualifications for their enjoyment and exercise, and have been, far from liberating, instruments of oppression. He illustrates this with reference to cultural encounters, colonialism, slavery, and gender. Boucher's contribution to the history of thought in international relations is widely acknowledged and his work is cited extensively in the field.

=== Aspects of Popular Culture ===
Boucher has applied some of the political theories on which he worked over the years to aspects of popular culture. In Dylan and Cohen: Poets of Rock and Roll, he applied hermeneutic and aesthetic theories to the lyric poetry of Bob Dylan and Leonard Cohen, in order to explore the political culture of their day.

Boucher analysed Dylan's and Cohen's songs in terms of three aesthetic theories, those of Collingwood, Oakeshott and Lorca, in order to differentiate the types of expressions the songs convey to suggest that certain kinds of response are inappropriate to some songs, but may be appropriate to others.

This book has been translated into six languages, including Spanish, Serbian and Polish. It has been re-issued following the death of Leonard Cohen and the conferment of the Nobel Prize for Literature on Bob Dylan. Boucher extended this research to explore the relationship with Bob Dylan, the Beats, and Dylan Thomas. Boucher's most recent work in this area has appeared in The Journal of Popular Music (2013) and Symbiosis (2016).

His most recent book is Bob Dylan and Leonard Cohen: Deaths and Entrances authored with Lucy Boucher.

== Awards and honors ==
- 1992 – Elected a fellow of the Royal Historical Society
- 1996 – Elected a senior associate of Pembroke College, Oxford for Hilary Term
- 2000 – Inaugural Alan Milne Memorial Lecture, University of Durham.
- 2007 – Leverhulme Fellowship
- 2010 – Elected a fellow of the Academy of Social Sciences
- 2011 – Elected a fellow of the Learned Society of Wales
- 2017 – 2020 – Elected vice-president of the Learned Society of Wales

== Books ==
- Texts in Context: Revisionist Methods for Studying the History of Ideas (Dordrecht, Martinus Nijhoff, 1985). ISBN 90-247-3121-6
- The Social and Political Thought of R. G. Collingwood. (Cambridge, Cambridge University Press, 1989). ISBN 0-521-36384-5.
- A Radical Hegelian: The Political Thought of Henry Jones (New York, St. Martin's Press, 1994: Cardiff, University of Wales Press, 1993). ISBN 0-7083-1207-1.
- Political Theories of International Relations: From Thucydides to the Present (Oxford, Clarendon Press, 1998). ISBN 0-19-878054-0.
- Steel, Skill and Survival: A Social History of Rugby in Ebbw Vale and the Valleys (Llandybie, Dinefwr Press, 2000). ISBN 0-9539293-0-2.
- British Idealism and Political Theory (Edinburgh, Edinburgh University Press, 2000)/ ISBN 07486 14281.
- Dylan and Cohen: Poets of Rock and Roll (New York, Continuum, 2004). ISBN 0-8264-5981-1
- The Limits of Ethics in International Relations: Natural Law, Natural Rights and Human Rights in Transtition (Oxford, Clarendon Press, 2009). ISBN 978-0-19-920352-9
- British Idealism: A Guide for the Perplexed. ISBN 978-0-8264-9678-2
- Liberalism and Human Rights: Idealist Perspectives. ISBN 978-957-732-469-6.
- Appropriating Hobbes: Legacies in Politics, Law and International Relations (Oxford University Press, 2018). ISBN 0-19-881721-5
- Bob Dylan and Leonard Cohen: Deaths and Entrances, with Lucy Boucher (New York: Bloomsbury, 2021). ISBN 978-1-5013-4566-1
- Language, Culture and Decolonisation, ed. (Cape Town: HSRC Press, 2022). ISBN 978-0-7969-2612-8
- Decolonisation: Revolution and Evolution, ed. with Ayesha Omar (Johannesburg: Wits University Press, 2023). ISBN 978-1-77614-845-5
- Reappraising the Life and Legacy of Jan C Smuts, ed. with Bongani Ngqulunga (Johannesburg: University of Johannesburg Press, 2024) ISBN 978-17764896-7-1
