= Hafner Manufacturing Company =

American Toy Company

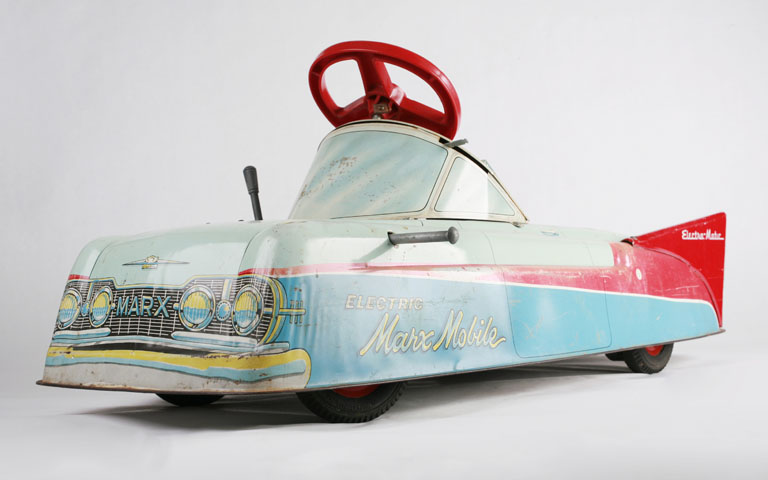
An Electric Marx Mobile, from 1959, in the permanent collection of The Children’s Museum of Indianapolis

The Hafner Manufacturing Company was a maker of tinplate clockwork-powered O gauge toy trains, based in Chicago, Illinois, from 1914 to 1951. It was formed when its founder, William Frederick Hafner, a co-founder of American Flyer, left the company in favor of creating his own company.

== Background ==
The reasons for Hafner departing American Flyer, the company he helped found, are lost to history. In the book Greenberg's Guide to American Flyer Prewar O Gauge, author Alan R. Schuweiler cites three possibilities: Hafner may not have known what official position he held in the company, he may have sought a larger share of the company, and he may have been passed over in favor of his co-founder's son, William Ogden Coleman Jr.

== Company history ==
During its peak periods, it employed as many as 150 people. While Hafner was able to quickly gain distribution from catalog retailer G. Sommers & Co., it never received the widespread distribution of the so-called "Big Four" of American Flyer, Lionel, Dorfan, and Ives.

The early Hafner trains bore the Overland Flyer brand and closely resembled competing offerings from American Flyer. As late as 1917 a car appeared in American Flyer's product line that closely resembled a Hafner design. This suggests the two companies worked together in their early days, or that one or both companies copied designs from the other. Since American Flyer was known to have purchased rolling stock from German competitor Bing, it is possible that American Flyer also purchased from Hafner, or vice versa.

Unlike most its competitors, not including Marx, Hafner survived the Great Depression without making significant changes to its product line, since it always specialized in inexpensive train sets that sold for US$3 or less. World War II proved a greater challenge. Since toy production was prohibited after 1942, toy companies had to adapt. While Marx, Lionel and the A. C. Gilbert Company were able to secure government contracts to manufacture items with military applications, Hafner lacked the tooling and manufacturing expertise to do the same. Hafner survived by forming a symbiotic relationship with the Fox Brewing Company. Fox was unable to secure bottlecaps from any other source, while Hafner was unable to make much else.

== Ownership changes ==
William Hafner's son John Hafner took over the company in 1933, but the elder Hafner stayed involved with the company until his death in 1944. John Hafner ran the company until 1951, when he sold the company to All Metal Products Company, the makers of the Wyandotte brand of toys. In a 1992 interview, Hafner said he was glad to get out of the business, citing increased difficulty competing with larger toy manufacturers.

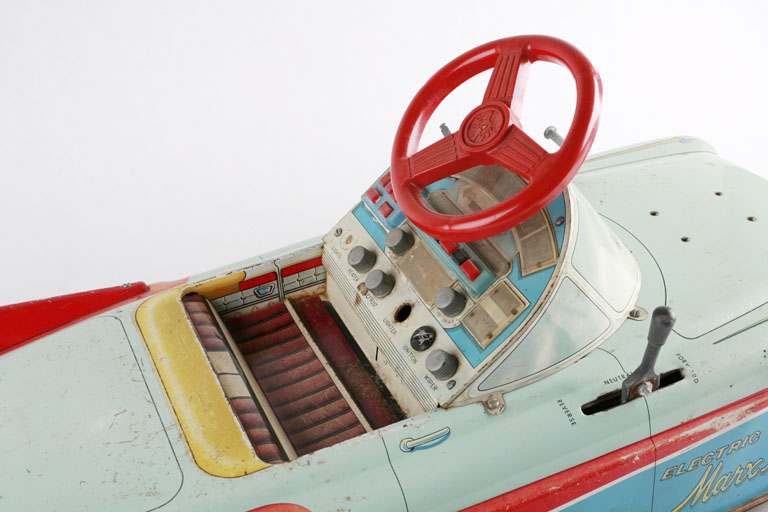
The detail of an Electric Marx Mobile, from 1959

Hafner's new ownership faced the same difficulties, and by 1956 was out of business and in liquidation. Louis Marx and Company purchased the Hafner tooling, then shipped it to its subsidiary in Mexico, where it was used to produce inexpensive windup and battery-powered sets. Many Marx collectors believe Louis Marx's primary motivation for the purchase was to eliminate another competitor from the marketplace.

The clockwork locomotives and colorful lithographed tinplate rolling stock placed Hafner at the low end of the market. Unlike most of its competitors, Hafner never created an electric train. Any Hafner electric trains that exist today were retrofitted with a motor from another manufacturer. Electrifying Hafner locomotives by outfitting them with surplus Marx electric motors is a somewhat common practice.

Both Hafner and Marx were known to use "recycled" lithography, a cost-saving practice where the tinplate from defective print runs was flipped over and printed on the blank side and used. The result of this is hidden graphics on the interior of cars and accessories. In addition to re-using its own defective sheets, Hafner would sometimes buy defective sheets from other companies as scrap and use it. Some Hafner collectors specialize in collecting these variations. Additionally, some metal products from the mid-20th century such as flashlights have surfaced with Hafner lithography inside, which indicates that Hafner sold its surplus or unusable print runs for use in the manufacture of products that would be painted.

== Sources ==
- "CTT visits John Hafner." Classic Toy Trains, June 1992, p. 91.
- Doyle, Paul, Maryland (1993). Greenberg's Early American Toy Trains. Greenberg Publishing. ISBN 0-89778-230-5.
