= Lionel Kiddie City =

American toy store

- Formerly: Lionel Kiddie City (1980-1993) Lionel Playworld (1969-1993) Lionel Toy Warehouse (1969-1990)
- Type: Public Company
- Industry: Retail
- Founded: 1969, New York City
- Defunct: July 1993, Lionel Kiddie City & Playworld; 1990, Lionel Toy Warehouse
- Fate: Liquidation
- Headquarters: Edison Township, New Jersey
- Number of locations: 29 (1993)
- Key people: Joshua Lionel Cowen; Harry C. Grant; Roy Cohn; Michael J. Vastola
- Products: Toys, video games, baby furniture
- Parent: Lionel Corporation

The Lionel toy stores (Lionel Kiddie City, Lionel Playworld, and, until 1990, Lionel Toy Warehouse) were American toy store chains owned and operated by the Lionel Corp.

== History ==
Kiddie City Toy Stores were started around 1957 in Philadelphia as toy supermarkets. By the early 1970s, Lionel had purchased the chain and grew it to 150 stores, under the names Lionel Kiddie City, Lionel Playworld, and Lionel Toy Warehouse (rebranded as Lionel Kiddie City in 1990). For a time it was the second-largest toy store chain in the United States. Lionel ran into financial trouble during the early 1980s recession and filed for Chapter 11 bankruptcy in February 1982. After reducing itself in size to 55 stores, it emerged from bankruptcy in September 1985. By 1991, the chain grew to 100 stores and was the fourth-largest toy retailer in the country, but once again ran into trouble due to a combination of factors. In 1989 Robert I. Toussie L.P., a partnership of several retail executives, attempted to buy the company. Lionel resisted, and the fight drained the company of cash. Meanwhile, non-specialty discount stores expanded their toy sections and undercut the prices of specialty toy chains. Additionally, Lionel found it difficult to compete on price with the larger Toys "R" Us, and the chain attempted to expand too rapidly in a weakened economy. After several successive unprofitable quarters, it filed for Chapter 11 bankruptcy on June 14, 1991. In 1992 Lionel attempted to reverse its fortunes by merging with the bankrupt Child World, the United States' #3 toy retailer, but was unable to secure financing. By February 1993 Lionel had closed all but 29 stores in six states, concentrating on the markets of Philadelphia, central New Jersey, Baltimore, Washington, D.C., Cleveland, Ohio and south Florida. Unable to reach an agreement for reorganization with its creditors, on June 2, Lionel announced its intention to liquidate all of its stores and go out of business.

The Lionel trademarks were purchased by Richard Kughn, a real estate magnate who had bought the Lionel model train line from General Mills in 1986.

== Slogans ==
- Shop Lionel (Kiddie City/Playworld), toy capital of the world!
- Let Lionel (Kiddie City/Playworld) turn that frown… upside down!
- Playworld, A World of Toys. Great for Girls, and Great for Boys. Playworld, Where Prices Go, So Low, Low, Low, Low, Low. (NY stores)
