= American Flyer =

American Toy company

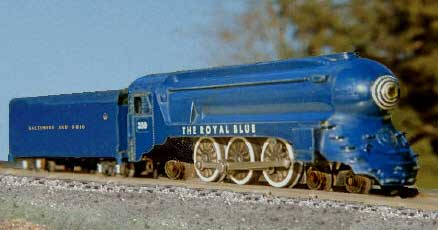
American Flyer S-gauge model from the early 1950s of the B&O 4-6-2 "Pacific" steam locomotive, as streamlined in 1937 by Otto Kuhler for the Royal Blue train.

American Flyer is a brand of toy train and model railroad, originally manufactured in the United States. It is best remembered for the S gauge trains of the 1950s that it made as a division of the A. C. Gilbert Company.

== The Chicago era, 1907–1938 ==
American Flyer was initially an independent company whose origins date back nearly a half century earlier. Chicago, Illinois-based toymaker William Frederick Hafner developed a clockwork motor for toy cars in 1901 while working for a company called Toy Auto Company. According to the recollections of William Hafner's son, John, he had developed a clockwork train running on O gauge track by 1905.

Hafner's friend, William Ogden Coleman, gained control of the Edmonds-Metzel Hardware Company, a struggling hardware manufacturer in Chicago, in 1906 or 1907. Hafner and Coleman began producing toy trains using Edmonds-Metzel's excess manufacturing capability after Hafner was able to secure $15,000 worth of orders. By 1907, two American retailers, G. Sommers & Co. and Montgomery Ward, were selling Hafner-Coleman a.k.a. Edmonds-Metzel trains. In 1908, Edmonds-Metzel adopted the American Flyer brand name for the trains, and by 1910, Edmonds-Metzel was out of the hardware business and changed its name to American Flyer Manufacturing Company.

Initially American Flyer—a.k.a. Chicago Flyer—was something of a budget brand, undercutting the prices of Ives, which was at the time the market leader. The trains proved popular, and American Flyer was soon expanding its product line. However, the company's rapid growth led to strains in the relationship between Hafner and Coleman.

In 1913, Hafner left the company. Believing he would be given a significant portion of the company if the trains proved successful, Coleman refused when Hafner asked to exercise this option. Hafner started the Hafner Manufacturing Company, which sold a line of trains called Overland Flyer. Sommers immediately stopped carrying the American Flyer trains in favor of Hafner's brand. Initially, the Hafner and American Flyer product lines were very similar, suggesting they may have been built using the same tooling. This suggests the possibility of the two companies continuing to collaborate. Hafner's business survived as a manufacturer of clockwork trains until 1951, when he sold his business to All Metal Products Company.

American Flyer's business grew during World War I, which locked out the German manufacturers that had dominated the U.S. toy train market to that point. During this time, American Flyer also introduced bicycle and motorcycle toys, segmented its market by creating both a low-priced and a high-priced line, and began to depart from its earlier designs by William Hafner.

In 1918, American Flyer introduced its first electric train, an O gauge model that was simply a windup model with an electric motor in place of the clockwork motor. This was a common practice at the time. The same year, William Coleman died and his son, William Ogden Coleman, Jr., took over the company. At that time the factory and administrative offices of the American Flyer Manufacturing Co. were located at 2219-2239 South Halsted Street in Chicago. The factory had its own railroad sidings and dock so cars could be slid inside the building for unloading/loading.

In 1925, American Flyer began offering wide gauge electric trains at a premium price, attempting to compete with Lionel Corporation at the high end of the market. Like most of its competition, American Flyer did well in the 1920s, selling more than half a million trains in its best years, but suffered in the Great Depression, during which the company's focus shifted back to the more economical O gauge trains.

In 1928, American Flyer's competitor Ives went bankrupt. American Flyer and Lionel jointly purchased and operated Ives until 1930, when American Flyer sold its share to Lionel. During this time of joint operation, American Flyer supplied Ives with car bodies and other parts.

During the early 1930s, American Flyer struggled under increased competition, especially at the low end of the market. In 1931, Flyer announced it would not produce an electric train set to sell for less than $4 like its competition had. However, within three months, it relented and released a train without transformer that sold for $3.95, and in 1932, it released a set with transformer that retailed for $3.50. Sales increased, but the company was not profitable. Expansion into other toy arenas also failed.

== A. C. Gilbert Company, 1938–1966 ==
In December, 1937, W.O. Coleman sold American (Chicago) Flyer to Alfred Carlton Gilbert, a former Olympic pole vaulter who first made a name for himself in the toy industry earlier in the century when he created and manufactured Mysto Magic sets for youthful magicians. Circa 1913, his A. C. Gilbert Company also became the makers of Erector Set metal construction toys, which were 'inspired' by the English-made Meccano sets of which it was a U.S. distributor. The two toy magnates were just finishing shooting on Gilbert's game reserve in New Haven when Gilbert casually mentioned he was thinking about manufacturing toy trains. Instead, Coleman said he'd give his struggling American Flyer Co. to Gilbert in return for a share of the profits. Gilbert quickly agreed.

Gilbert soon moved the company from Chicago to New Haven, Connecticut, and re-designed parts of the product line. The initial changes included substitution of the 'slot & tab' couplers with link-and-pin semi-automatic ones on the higher-priced 10" freight cars and steam engine tenders. Three significantly detailed and overall scale length O gauge steam engines were introduced in the 1938 catalog: Atlantic (4-4-2), Pacific (4-6-2) and an 0-6-0 switcher. The years 1938 through 1941 saw the production of Gilbert's "Tru Model" 3/16" O gauge trains. The engines offered in this line were fairly accurate scale replicas of the locomotives they were modeled after. A Reading Lines Atlantic, Pennsylvania K5 Pacific, a NYC Hudson, a B&O streamlined steamer (Royal Blue), a UP Northern (4-8-4) and an NKP 0-8-0 Switcher. This line would later become the postwar 3/16" scale or S gauge line with two rail tracks. Also, its HO product line was introduced in the 1938 catalog. The design of the initial version of the HO track was significantly different from that of typical electric trains: the rails were mounted on lithographed roadbed.

Gilbert was not the first American company to offer 3/16" 'S' scale trains. The Cleveland (Ohio) Model & Supply Company had been offering theirs (known as "C-D") by '37. But the smaller scale (1:64) became much more prominent with its introduction in the 1939 catalog, which features World's Fair imagery on the yellow, black and white cover. The relatively expensive, heavy and highly detailed engines and cars had had diecast zinc alloy bodies. As were the HO rolling stock, the engines and cars were offered in completely manufactured and kit forms. Additional engines, cars and accessories were added in the 1940 catalog. These included less costly engines with tinplate tenders, and less costly freight and passenger cars, also made of painted tinplated steel. The 3/16 scale trains were designed to run on O gauge track whose curved sections had 20" radii (formed 40" circles). Importantly, the trains featured fully automatic coupling and uncoupling that were functionally comparable to Lionel's. Unlike Lionel's costly and sophisticated design (each truck contained a solenoid and electrical pickup shoe), the American Flyer 'link & pin' (a.k.a. 'harpoon') couplers were gravity based.

Except for updated versions of the 1937 whistling billboard and trackage, all of the products offered in the 1941 catalog had been designed under Gilbert's ownership. The 'Chicago' products had been expunged. The scale accuracy was emphasized in the catalogs and packaging. Already experiencing materials shortages (due to Lend Lease), no new products were introduced in the 1942 catalog, which was only slight different than the previous edition. Prices were printed on an accompanying unstapled sheet but not on the bound pages. Even the set numbers (i.e. 4117) were not changed. The cover of the '42 edition is distinguished from the '41 by a caveat about erratic availability printed in small red fonts.

During Summer 1942, Gilbert (as were many manufacturing companies) was compelled by Federal wartime restrictions to cease manufacturing and servicing its electric train and other metal consumer products. It did not again publish American Flyer catalogs until 1946. The manufacturing hiatus offered the company the opportunity to further differentiate its products from those of the market leaders Marx and Lionel. By Summer, 1945 it was able to resume limited manufacturing of the 3/16s scale O gauge trains. While it did so, the same sized products were re-engineered to run on much more realistic two rail (with a "T" profile rail) track. The fine detail of the diecast engines, tenders and cars that had debuted in the '39 catalog reappeared. The engines and tenders continued to be made of diecast metal, but the cars' bodies were made out of plastic. Two pages of the 1946 catalog emphasize the running advantages of the lighter cars. Ironically, they soon realized that they had to add weight. Metal car bottoms and chassis were necessary to prevent the too-light cars from tipping over. The 'link & pin' automatic couplers that had been introduced on the 3/16s O products were reduced in size, with plastic replacing the sintered metal of the originals. They too, later had metal weights added because they would fail to descend to the locking position needed for cars to couple. The chugging mechanisms of the premium O gauge tenders were redesigned to also generate smoke, which was conveyed to the engines' smokestacks via a black rubber tube that protruded out of the rear of the cab so that it could connect to the front of the tender.

Because of the relatively accurate scale of the rolling stock and two rail track, these trains (not yet referred to as "S" gauge by Gilbert) were significantly more realistic than their 3 rail O gauge counterparts.

Gilbert apparently ceased offering O gauge rolling stock by '47, but did continue to offer O gauge parts.

The product line continued to be refined and expanded. The chugger / smoker was redesigned and moved from the tenders into the engines. The advantages included eliminating the separate motor (power drain and cost) and ensuring precise (geared) synchronicity of the chugging with the rotation of the drive wheels. DC versions of the engines were offered in the 1949 line. Two different engines (the other AC) could be controlled with nominal independence on the same track. Diesels, not offered since 1940, were offered in the 1950 line.

In 1946 Lionel also debuted its postwar trains. They too featured smoking but also its ingeniously designed (also solenoid based) and realistic knuckle coupler. With the improved coupler, it also introduced its very realistic sintered metal trucks. In 1952, a few premium sets featured the American Flyer version of the knuckle coupler and sintered truck. By the next year, the 'link & pin' coupler and stamped steel trucks had been discontinued. Gilbert offered conversion kits so that the new couplers could be mounted on the old trucks.

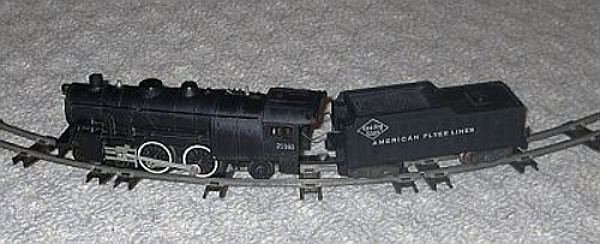
This American Flyer S gauge 4-4-2 (Atlantic type) steam locomotive and tender dates from 1960. It is descended from the O gauge version #565

Although popular, American Flyer was always the second-ranked brand to Lionel in terms of market share at the high end of the market. With Louis Marx and Company dominating the low end and a handful of other brands relegated to entry level of the market, Lionel and American Flyer shared premium status. A rivalry emerged between both companies' fans that continues today.

Gilbert also renewed offering its HO trains shortly after the War, but aside from changing to DC motors and making the cars lighter by using plastic, the products were not updated to conform with the increasingly popular NMRA (National Model Railroad Association) coupler and track standards until 1951. Despite its relatively long experience with HO, Gilbert's share of that market steadily waned.

The founder, A.C. Gilbert, passed away in 1961. With the popularity of toy trains and construction toys declining, and without another successful product line to buoy the company's finances, Gilbert found itself in serious financial trouble. Finally, a majority of the company was sold by the family to a holding company, the Wrather Group, in 1962 with A.C. Gilbert, Jr., acting as CEO. Within a few months, though, A.C. Jr. died. The company continued to manufacture trains of limited appeal due to the diminished quality.

Under the new ownership, the A.C. Gilbert Co. continued to struggle, although the new owners did more aggressive advertising and marketing than when the firm was headed by the more conservative A.C. Gilbert. It manufactured a wide variety of poorly designed and poorly conceived toys (dolls, racing sets, games) that sold slowly, if at all, and was nearly overwhelmed by store returns of defective merchandise. Gilbert took an especially hard hit when a majority of a poorly designed and manufactured red James Bond 007 slot car racing set flooded back as returns after component failures. Additionally, the company sold many of its toy line products to discounters with a "100% sale guarantee." When the merchandise did not sell, it ended up back in Gilbert's warehouses. The company discontinued the American Flyer train line in 1966 and was liquidated in 1967.

== Lionel, 1979–present ==
In May 1967, Lionel Corporation announced it had purchased the American Flyer name and tooling even though it was teetering on the brink of financial failure itself. A May 29, 1967, story in The Wall Street Journal made light of the deal, stating, "Two of the best-known railroads in the nation are merging and the Interstate Commerce Commission couldn't care less". Former Lionel treasurer Robert A. Stein said Lionel did not initiate the deal; both companies had farmed out their accounts receivable departments to Walter Heller & Co., who initiated the transaction. While various accounts published over the years valued the deal at $150,000, Stein's recollection was that Lionel simply liquidated $300,000–$400,000 worth of American Flyer inventory for Heller in exchange for the tooling, which, by some accounts, sat unused and neglected in a parking lot for some period of time. Lionel Corporation never manufactured American Flyer trains.

Within two years, Lionel Corp. was bankrupt itself and had sold its train lines to General Mills, including the unused American Flyer tooling. In 1979, General Mills' Lionel division started to reissue Flyer products under that name employing a mix of previously unused railroad heralds and traditional Gilbert American Flyer designs.

In 1984, General Mills sold the Lionel Co. to Kenner, a toy manufacturer. One year later, the company was sold to Richard Kughn, a Detroit toy train collector who made his fortune selling and developing real estate. For over a decade, Kughn moved both the Lionel and American Flyer brands forward, getting a shot of momentum from a resurgence in the toy train hobby in the early 1990s. In 1996, Kughn sold a majority interest to Wellspring Partners LLD, a Chicago-based national turnaround firm headed by Martin Davis. Kughn retained a small percentage, and rock star Neil Young, another toy train buff, also became a minor investor. Young's contributions include designing a sound system for trains (RailSounds) in 1992, as well as the Trainmaster Command Control (TMCC), a unique radio control system. The new company is known as Lionel, LLC.

The American Flyer brand name survives today under the ownership of Lionel, LLC. Most of the American Flyer-branded product sold by Lionel, LLC today is reissues of 1950s designs utilizing refurbished old Gilbert tooling, decorated in traditional road names and paint schemes used by Gilbert, as well as an influx of some of today's modern railroad heralds. One complaint by longtime American Flyer devotees is that Lionel isn't creating Flyer products that appeal to the toy train masses—rather, focusing instead on a small market of Flyer collectors.

However, winds of change are blowing. Each year since 2002 Lionel has increased the number of American Flyer offerings, a sign the demand for 3/16" S gauge is growing. In late 2004, Lionel finally debuted a new steam locomotive—a highly detailed, 2-8-2 Mikado in multiple road names. Utilizing all new tooling and issued under the American Flyer name, the Mike is the first original American Flyer steam locomotive design since the late 1950s. Complete with TMCC (Lionel's proprietary wireless remote control technology) and a superb sound chip/system (TrainSounds), the Mikados proved to be a hot seller and their success has led to future similar issues. In late 2006, Lionel began delivering an updated remake of its largest steam locomotive, the famous 4-8-4 Northern, as well as a gray Union Pacific Northern with smoke deflectors (elephant ears); both new versions have digital sounds. Due in late 2006 or early 2007 was a new high-detail Pacific (4-6-2) with both TMCC capability and RailSounds. Additionally, Lionel released, in 2006, the first newly tooled passenger fleet. These heavyweight style cars are neither a refashioning of older Flyer designs nor a repurposing of Lionel 027 rolling stock (as some earlier Lionel/Flyer freight cars had been). Also in 2007 Lionel started to sell American Flyer track, the popular 19" radius curve remaining unavailable to this day. In 2008, Lionel released an American Flyer Big Boy with TMCC and Railsounds.

The license to manufacture the track had been held by Maury Klein, whose K-Line brand of 0 gauge trains competed against Lionel in the toy train renaissance of the 1980s and ’90s and into the 21st. century. When K-Line fell upon hard times in recent years, it was purchased by Lionel LLC, who then got the Flyer track as well as the tooling for two 0 gauge locomotive designs: the UP Big-Boy and the C&O Allegheny. Both of these engines had been tooled to 1/60th scale so that 0 gauge operators with small layouts and narrow radius curves would be able to enjoy what would otherwise be behemoth engines. Their closeness to 1/64th scale, however, made these engines naturals for development into the American Flyer Line, particularly since Lionel already possesses tooling for these locomotives in their 0 scale product lines. After considerable delay the company finally delivered the Big Boy in December 2009. No offering was made as to the Allegheny.
