= Edward Ives =

Edward Ives may refer to:

- Edward Ives (naval surgeon) (1719–1786), British naval surgeon
- Edward Ives (rower) (born 1961), American Olympic rower
- Edward Ives (toymaker) (1839–1918), founder of Ives Manufacturing
- Edward D. Ives (1925–2009), American folklorist
- Edward H. Ives (1819–1892), member of the Wisconsin State Senate
