= Child World =

Defunct American toy store chain

Children's Palace Toy Stores
- Type: Corporation
- Industry: Retail
- Founded: 1962; 64 years ago
- Defunct: September 12, 1992; 34 years ago
- Fate: Liquidation
- Products: Toys

Child World was an American toy retailer founded in 1962. The company also operated the Children's Palace chain of toy stores after acquiring it in 1975.

At its peak, Child World operated 182 sites between its two brands and had revenues of $830 million (~$1.71 billion in 2025). However, the company ran into severe financial difficulty at the beginning of the 1990s, which led to bankruptcy and eventually the 1992 liquidation of the stores.

== History ==
Beginnings and early expansion

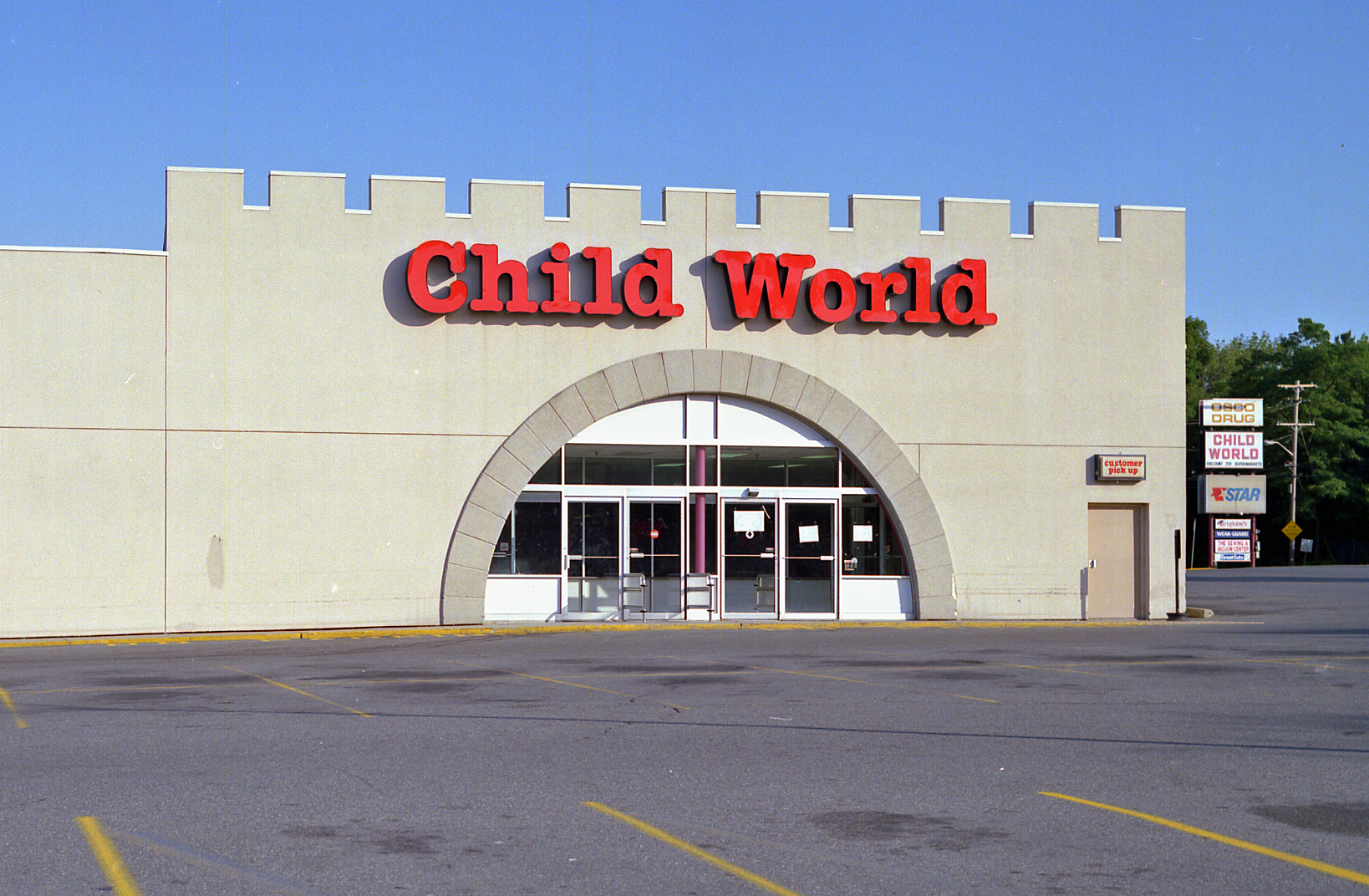
Saugus, Massachusetts Child World store, 1993

Child World was founded by Joseph Arnesano & Sid Schneider in Quincy, Massachusetts in 1962. It became a publicly-traded corporation in 1968, based in Avon, Massachusetts.

It acquired Children's Palace from Kobacker Stores in 1975. Post merger, Child World began incorporating the Children's Palace stylized castle decor into its new stores.

In 1981, Child World was purchased by Ohio businessman Joseph E. Cole's Cole National Corporation; it came under the ownership of Kohlberg Kravis Roberts following its 1984 purchase of Cole's firm.

Downfall

Cole National began restricting the amount of money it provided to the subsidiary causing cash shortages. Vendors including LEGO refused to extend credit which left stores with empty shelves. Meanwhile Toys "R" Us continued to grow and Child World had to defend a lawsuit from the Consumer Product Safety Commission.

Child World ended 1990 with US$830 million in assets but US$1 billion in liabilities. Cole National sought to sell the ailing chain. A US$157 million deal fell through and there were no other buyers. In 1991, it emerged senior executive James Maybury had been diverting revenue to fund a museum he intended to open in Dracut, MA. Cole National had to perform a debt trade with fellow venture capital firm Avon Investment Limited Partnership later that year in order to shed the business. Avon appointed former Toys "R" Us executives, but results remained poor and in early 1992 Child World closed 26 stores.

Bankruptcy, failed merger, and liquidation

In April 1992, Child World applied for Chapter 11 bankruptcy protection causing former Child World managers and Cole National executives to file a class-action lawsuit against Avon, accusing it of sabotaging the company so they could liquidate it and avoid payments to them. A further 54 stores were identified for closure as Child World focussed on 71 previously profitable Northeastern United States stores it sought funds to keep open. Lenders were not forthcoming and the business reported further losses. Avon sought a last ditch merger of Child World with Lionel Corporation's also financially troubled Lionel Kiddie City, while beginning a massive clearance sale to try to raise cash. The merger talks proved fruitless, and Child World began liquidation sales in the summer of 1992 while terminating many of its executives. The last Child World locations closed in September of that year.

== Store design ==
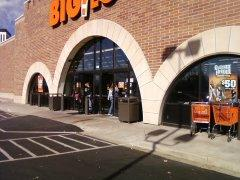
Entrance to former Children's Palace in Englewood, Colorado (later a Big Lots, as seen above the door, with the design from the store still in place), this location has since closed as of early 2023.

Child World was known largely for making its stores resemble castles, complete with turrets, battlements, and three arches (two small, one large) in the front door.
