= Ives Manufacturing Company =

Defunct American toy train manufacturer

The Ives Manufacturing Company, an American toy manufacturer from 1868 to 1932, was the largest manufacturer of toy trains in the United States from 1910 until 1924, when Lionel Corporation overtook it in sales.

== Early history ==
Ives was founded in Plymouth, Connecticut by Edward Ives, a descendant of Plymouth colony governor William Bradford. The company initially produced paper dolls whose limbs moved in response to hot air, but soon began producing a wide range of toys, including a toy cannon that shot using real gunpowder and also toy clockwork powered dolls and animals that could move. The clockwork toys were designed by Jerome Secor, Nathan Warner, and Arthur Hotchkiss and by the 1880s, Ives was a leading producer of these toys.

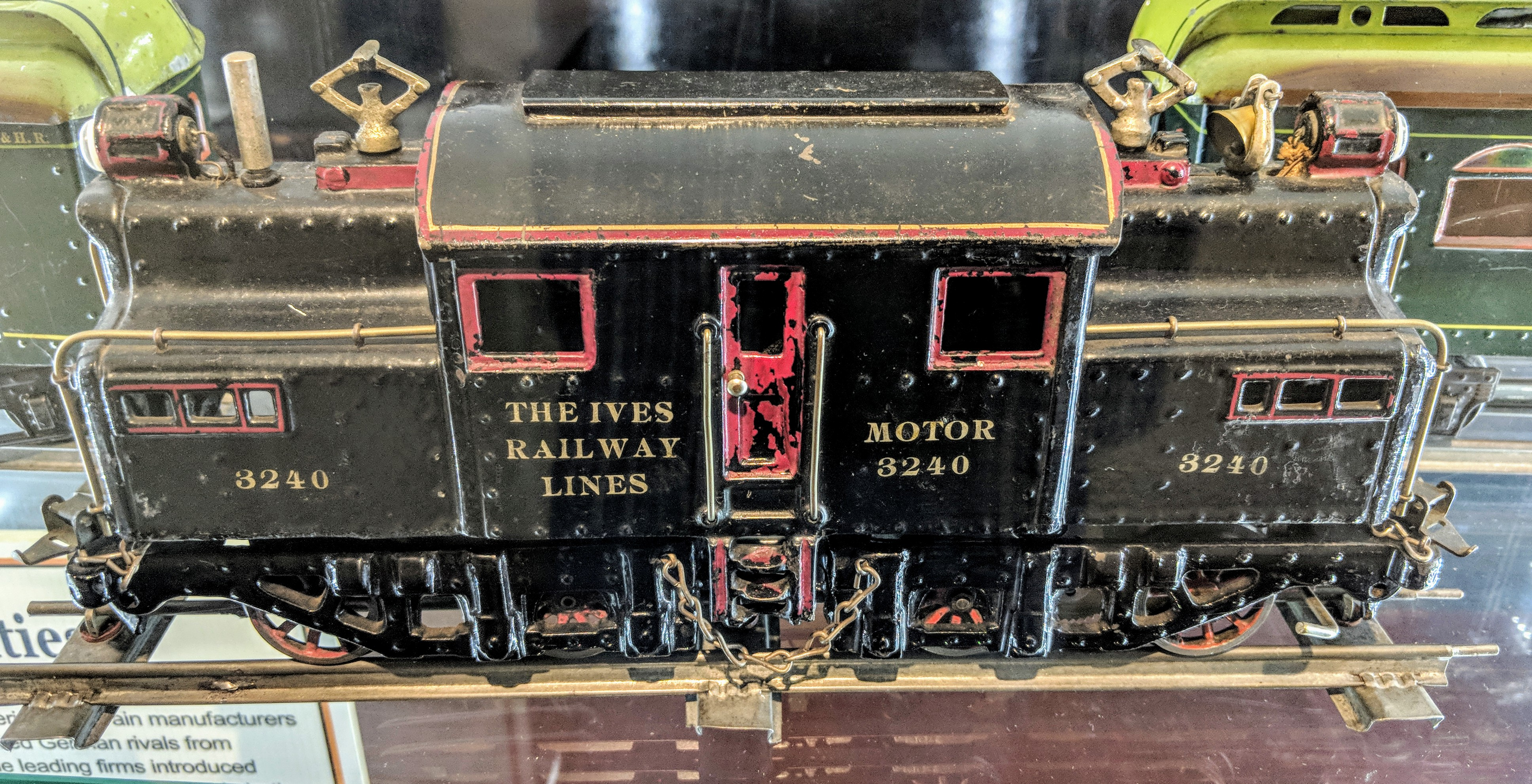
Ives model railroad locomotive, circa 1912

Its emphasis shifted to trains as its designs were copied by other toymakers who were willing to sell them more cheaply. Ives' trains were made of tin or cast iron and initially powered by clockwork, and later electric trains

On December 22, 1900, a disastrous fire struck and destroyed the Ives & Williams Company main factory, destroying the building and all the patterns, parts and tools for manufacturing the cast-iron toys. The fire prompted a re-design by William R. Haberlin for 1901 that resulted in Ives' first toy train that ran on track. In 1901, The Ives Manufacturing Company, in a space rented from William R. Haberlin and Timothy F. Hayes, began producing the first "O" gauge trains in the United States to run on a fabricated sectional track. The trains were powered by clockwork machinery inside the toy, and sales for the year totaled $2,600 (equivalent to about $94,000 of purchasing power in today's money). In 1901 and 1902, the die stamping production of trains, cars and track was subcontracted out to Haberlin and Hayes Bridgeport Tool & Die. In the end, the fire benefited the Ives Manufacturing Company, as the insurance money permitted it to build a modern factory with state-of-the-art tooling.

Although several companies were selling electric trains at the time, Ives opted to remain with clockwork, partly because many U.S. homes still lacked electricity.

Initially, Ives' greatest competition came from German imports, and not from domestic manufacturers. Ives' response was with a marketing campaign targeting the American twelve-year-old boy, which was their ideal demographic. Its campaigns addressed boys as business partners, telling them that the success of Ives' fictional railroad, Ives Railway Lines, depended on their shrewd management. The campaign succeeded in building brand loyalty for the company, and they would go on to become the largest manufacturer of toy trains from 1910 until Lionel overtook them in sales in 1924.

== William R. Haberlin ==
William R. Haberlin is the man who made all of the tools and dies for the original Ives O-gauge ("O" gauge) clockwork train line in 1901. Aside from the patterns for the iron locomotives bodies (made by Charles A. Hotchkiss, mentioned in Model Craftsman - March 1944) and the clockwork mechanisms themselves (manufactured by The Reeves Manufacturing Company in New Haven, Connecticut, later in Milford, Connecticut), everything that went into this line was tooled up by Haberlin and his partner, T.F. Hayes (Timothy F. Hayes), in their tool shop, the Hayes & Haberlin Machine Company in Bridgeport, Connecticut.

The work included the first tools and machinery ever built in the United States for manufacturing tinplate track. The first year, as Ives was in a hurry to get track, a set of drop-hammers were made up for the rails and ties. The tinplate was first cut up into strips and then placed under the drop-hammer. The next year Haberlin and Hayes made up regular dies for use in a punch press, which would cut the rails and ties out of sheet tin. Thirty thousand rails could be made in a day; a working day in 1902 being ten hours. Ives did not make a machine for rolling their rails until somewhat later (In 1907-1908, after Haberlin had left the Ives' Manufacturing Company to work for Sir Thomas Edison as a toolmaker/machinist with his brother John E. Haberlin in Edison's laboratory in West Orange, New Jersey).

Haberlin later went on to work for Ives entirely, using his expertise as a tool maker to design and machine all of their early dies. When he decided to work for the company, Ives bought his tool shop, Hayes & Haberlin Machine Company, to assist the transition. In 1906, Haberlin left Ives and started making up dies for himself, founding the American Miniature Railway Company in Bridgeport, Connecticut (which was both Ives' and Haberlin's hometown) on April 6, 1907. The company would be one of the least known of the early American tinplate manufacturers, only gaining recent notoriety. Having designed and built the original line, Haberlin's new company would create and manufacture a similar line to Ives until 1912.

== Electric trains ==
Ives released its first electric trains in 1910, partially in response to companies such as American Flyer undercutting its prices on clockwork trains. Ives initially produced electric trains in O gauge and 1 gauge.

Ives' train sales continued to decline in the face of increasing competition and Lionel's greater momentum, the latter having released its first electric trains nearly a decade earlier. Meanwhile, construction toys were gaining in popularity, so in an effort to re-diversify, Ives released a Meccano and Erector Set-like construction toy in 1913 named Struktiron. Although it offered parts its competition did not, the set was not very successful and Ives withdrew it from the market in 1917.

World War I had mixed effects on the company. On one hand, it eliminated imports from Germany, increasing Ives' share of the market. However, Ives' geographic location made it difficult to bring in the materials it needed to make trains, as well as shipping finished products. Lionel and American Flyer, being headquartered in New York City and Chicago, respectively, did not face that challenge. Additionally, Ives' isolation made it impossible for Ives to gain lucrative wartime government manufacturing contracts. As a result, Ives did not benefit financially from the war.

After the war, Ives, along with competitors Lionel and American Flyer, lobbied successfully for protective tariffs to promote the fledgling American toy train industry. As a result, there was very little foreign competition after World War I, especially at the high end of the market where Ives had positioned itself.

The seasonal nature of train sales continued to cause concern for Ives, and Harry Ives, Edward Ives' son and successor, sought one last time to diversify by selling toy boats, which he hoped would support the company through strong summer sales. The first boats, released in 1917, were powered by a clockwork engine from an Ives O gauge locomotive. However, the designs were unrealistic looking, lacking the costly detail that was the highlight of competing German designs, and had a tendency to sink easily. Additionally, since Ives did not use a primer when painting the boats, the paint flaked off easily. Ives had difficulty adapting its methods for designing and building trains to work for boats. Despite the problems, Ives continued producing the boats until 1928. Few Ives boats exist today, but it is unclear whether this was due to lack of popularity or their propensity to sink.

Harry Ives had a heated professional relationship with Lionel founder Joshua Lionel Cowen, in which they traded lawsuits and, starting in 1915, Lionel criticized the quality of Ives' offerings in print advertisements, calling its cars flimsy and showing a cast-iron Ives locomotive shattering into 15 pieces when dropped from a table, while a Lionel locomotive dropped from the same height would survive with only dents. Other ads criticizing Ives' quality appeared, but they always compared Ives' cheapest products with Lionel's priciest offerings.

Although Ives could rightly claim that its lithographed offerings were more realistic than Lionel's simple enameled two-color cars, Lionel, taking a cue from Ives, targeted advertising straight at children, claiming its cars were the most realistic and that its paint jobs were more durable.

Ives' subdued responses did little to counter Lionel's claims, only calling its competitors imitators whose technology was "12 years behind." It was no match for Lionel's bold and brash ads. Additionally, Lionel's trains generally were priced lower, or, in instances where their price was comparable to Ives, they were larger, making them appear to be a better value for the money. As a result, Lionel continually gained ground on Ives, finally overtaking them in sales in 1924.

In 1921, Ives abruptly discontinued its slow-selling 1 gauge trains in favor of Wide Gauge trains, a standard Lionel had introduced several years earlier and called "Standard Gauge". Ives did not call its trains Standard Gauge, as Lionel had trademarked the name. While Ives was inconsistent in what it called its larger-gauge trains, it most frequently called it wide gauge. Numerous other companies also entered the wide gauge market in the early 1920s, increasing consumer interest in the size and forcing the manufacturers to innovate in order to survive.

In 1924, Ives introduced a locomotive engine that would change directions when its power flow was interrupted, a feature that Lionel would not offer for another two years. Even after Lionel's introduction, Ives' offering was unique in that it offered a neutral position as well as forward and reverse, and the engine's headlight continued to operate even when the train was in neutral. Ives charged a premium for this feature, which it dubbed the "R-unit" (the "R" stood for 'remote'), and it increased sales.

This was not enough for Ives to re-take its former place as market leader—by 1926, Lionel's revenue was twice that of Ives'--and, worse yet for the company, Ives was losing money by the mid-1920s. This was worsened by Ives' attempts to compete at the low end of the market, where, unlike its competition, it sold its entry-level models at a loss. If Ives' low-end products were higher quality than its competitors, it benefited its customers, not the company.

=== Slogan ===
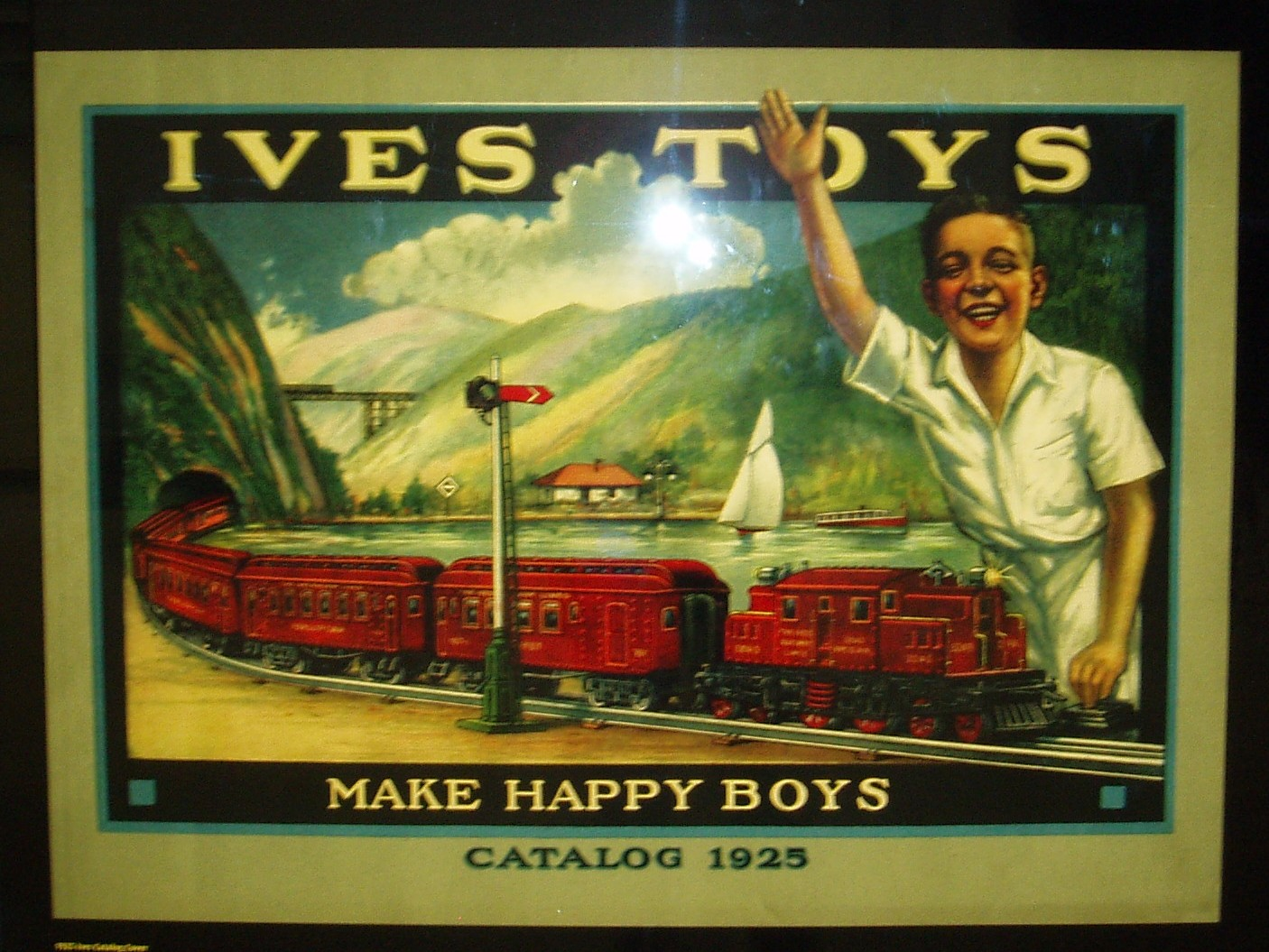
Poster from 1925 at SFO Airport showing the slogan for Ives Toys

For a time, the Ives Manufacturing Company used the slogan: "Ives Toys Make Happy Boys".

== Bankruptcy ==
In an effort to turn around the company, Harry Ives relinquished his presidency in 1927, becoming chairman of the board and bringing in an outsider, Charles R. Johnson, as president, but problems continued and Ives' largest creditor sued in 1928. Ives filed for bankruptcy, reporting liabilities of $188,303.25. As Ives already had $245,000 in Christmas sales lined up, Johnson petitioned for a private sale and a quick settlement. The motion for a private sale was denied.

On July 31, 1928, Ives was purchased by Lionel and American Flyer for $73,250. The low price in comparison to the company sales was presumably due to liens on Ives' assets. Lionel and Flyer then operated Ives as a joint venture, retaining Johnson and Harry Ives as president and chairman, respectively. Harry Ives left the company in September 1929, and died within seven years.

Ives' new owners immediately discontinued the line of toy boats, and much of Ives' train product line was replaced with relabeled American Flyer or Lionel product, and most new designs were carried out using Lionel and American Flyer parts, even though Ives' own designs were usually more realistic. There are several reasons for this. When Lionel and American Flyer bought Ives, they did not buy the factory or tooling, which they then had to rent. It may have been less expensive for the parent companies to supply their own parts than to rent the old Ives tooling. Some historians have speculated that the Ives tooling was worn out and no longer suitable for use. A third factor was that Lionel's and Flyer's manufacturing process was less labor-intensive, which made their designs less expensive to manufacture than the Ives designs they replaced.

A notable exception was the Ives 1122 locomotive, first produced in 1929, which was the first near-to-scale model of an existing locomotive to enter the marketplace. Although it had a 4-4-2 wheel configuration, it was otherwise a recognizable copy of the Baltimore and Ohio Railroad President Washington Class 4-6-2 locomotive.

Whatever the reasons, the Ives product line after 1928 inherited many recognizable traits from three different companies' product lines.

== Lionel Manufactured Production ==
In 1930, Lionel bought out American Flyer's share in Ives and closed the Ives factory in Connecticut, moving operations to Lionel's New Jersey factory. Lionel kept the Ives brand on the market through 1932, then repositioned Ives for 1933, branding its entry-level trains as Lionel-Ives, then dropped the Ives name altogether following that year. Although re-issues were occasionally made, the Ives name never re-appeared on the marketplace with any kind of regularity.

Although Joshua Lionel Cowen would later claim that he dumped all of the Ives molds in the Connecticut River, Ives' influence lived on. Lionel continued the Ives practice of issuing low-end train sets that ran on a circle of O-gauge track with a 27-inch diameter, and Lionel incorporated some Ives-designed freight cars into its product line. The Lionel 1680 tanker car, for instance, was an Ives design that remained in Lionel's catalogs right up to the start of World War II.

Even more significantly, the Ives e-unit first introduced in 1924 lived on in Lionel locomotives, with a modified version of the Ives design first appearing in Lionel trains starting in 1933. Some historians have said Cowen coveted the Ives e-unit, and that it was the primary reason Lionel bought the company. It would remain present in Lionel trains for more than 50 years.
