= Lionel Wartime Freight Train =

Set box and contents.

The Lionel Wartime Freight Train, better known among collectors as the "paper train," was a toy train set sold by the Lionel Corporation in 1943.

== Origins ==
During World War II, government-mandated restrictions on the use of various metals halted production of all metal toys in favor of the war effort. Lionel, seeking an alternative product to keep the brand name alive during the war, sought the assistance of Samuel Gold, a designer of various novelties including cereal and soft drink premiums. Gold made an agreement with Lionel and completed a design for an all-paper product train in March 1943. It was sold for a retail price of $1 for the 1943 Christmas season, but disappeared soon afterwards due to poor customer response. Lionel began manufacturing its conventional products again beginning in late 1945.

== Features ==
The paper train came in a flat box containing several sheets of heavy cardstock measuring 11 x 15 inches, on which was printed the various pieces of the set. Once assembled it included a steam locomotive, tender, boxcar, gondola, and caboose; all decorated for the fictional Lionel Lines. There were three railway employees, a crossing signal, crossing gate, and enough ties and rails to create a circle of track measuring 16 feet, 4 inches in circumference. In total, there were over 250 paper parts, 21 wooden dowel axles, and 42 corresponding pasteboard wheels.

Although the set did well financially, it was difficult to assemble and keep intact. The train was designed with the parts pre-scored and tabbed for assembly without cutting or adhesive but the tabs were prone to coming apart, and the train did not stay on the cardstock track reliably once assembled. As a result, the paper train overwhelmed many customers, so often parents simply gave up on assembly and threw it out.

== Current Value / Reproduction ==
Today, original unassembled paper trains sell for around $300 in like-new condition, and up to $400 in perfect, mint condition. Greenberg Publishing Company of Sykesville, MD. offered a reproduction set in 1981. The reproduction can be distinguished from an original by examining the print - Lionel's model used four-color ink only, while the reproduction also makes use of regular black ink. Also, while the original set was die-cut so pieces could be easily punched out and scored for easy folding, the reproduction set is not pre-cut or scored. The reproduction set also did not include wooden axles.
