= Joshua Lionel Cowen =

American inventor (1877–1965)

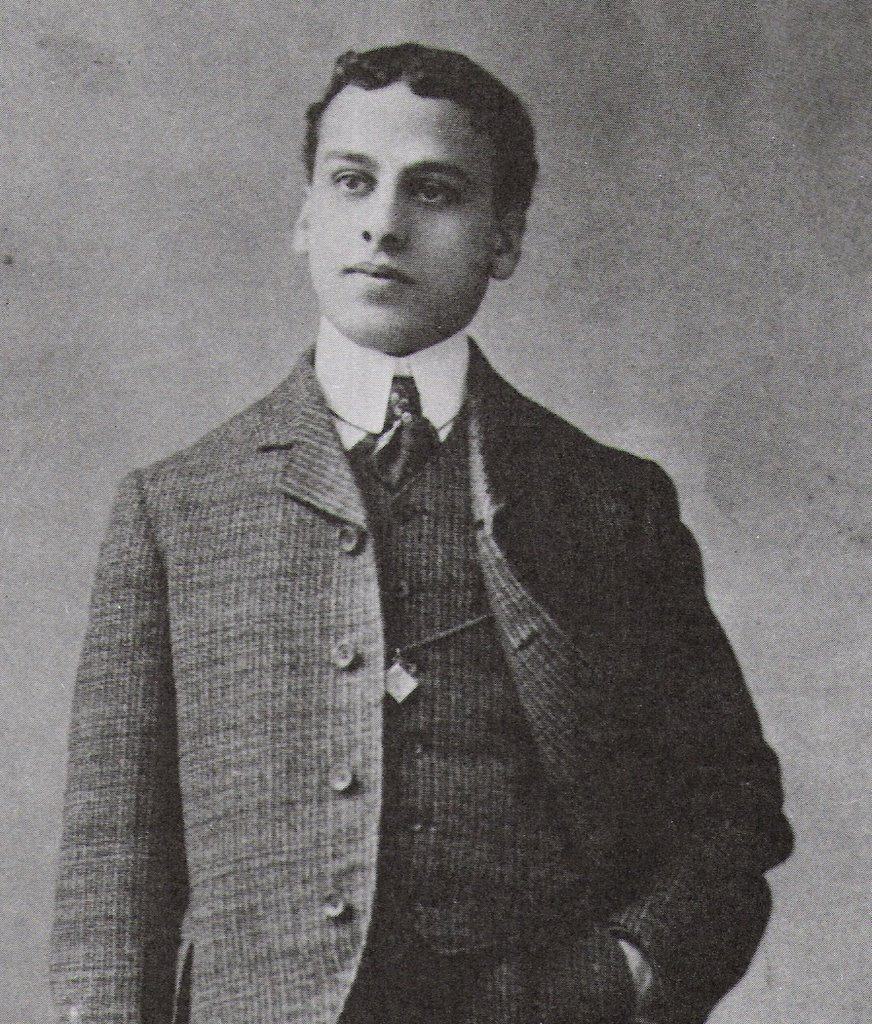
- circa 1903
- Born: Joshua Lionel Cohen; August 25, 1877; Queens, New York City, U.S.
- Died: September 8, 1965 (aged 88); Palm Beach, Florida, U.S.
- Known for: co-founder of Lionel Corporation
- Spouses: Cecelia "Mimia" Liberman (m. 1905; died 1946) Lillian Appel Herman (m. 1949)
- Children: 2
- Parent(s): Hyman Nathan Cohen; Rebecca Kantrowitz
- Family: Roy Cohn (great-nephew)

Joshua Lionel Cowen (né Cohen; August 25, 1877 – September 8, 1965) was an American inventor and cofounder of the Lionel Corporation, a manufacturer of model railroads and toy trains who gained prominence in the market before and after World War II.

== Early life ==
Joshua Lionel Cohen was born in Queens, New York City on August 25, 1877 to Hyman Nathan Cohen and his wife Rebecca (née Kantrowitz) Cohen; he had eight siblings. His parents were Jewish immigrants from Germany.

Cohen had built his first toy train at age seven, attaching a small steam engine to a wooden locomotive he had carved. The engine exploded, damaging his parents' kitchen. He studied at Columbia University and the City College of New York.

== Business career ==
Cohen received his first patent in 1899, for a device that ignited a photographer's flash. The same year, he was awarded a defense contract from the United States Navy to produce mine fuses, earning $12,000.

== Lionel Corporation ==
Cohen and his associate Harry Grant founded Lionel Corporation in New York City in 1900. Sources disagree on what inspired this action. According to The New York Times, he devised a battery-powered fan for his shop, then connected the fan's motor to a small model train. The Record (Hackensack, New Jersey) states that Cohen designed his model train after seeing a stationary model train in a department store window. A Manhattan shopkeeper bought Cowen's first electric train in 1901 and used it as a storefront display. After customers indicated that they wanted to buy the display, the shopkeeper bought six more trains.

After expanding the production of toy trains and building his business, in 1910 Cohen legally changed his surname to "Cowen", to avoid anti-semitism. There had been waves of Jewish immigrants from Germany and eastern Europe to the United States, and many others also adopted anglicized names. Cowen often gave his birthdate as 1880, but his birth was recorded three years earlier.

After World War I, Lionel had become one of the top three manufacturers in the United States of electrical trains. It competed with American Flyer and Louis Marx and Company. By the early 1950s, Lionel had expanded into other lines and become the world's largest toy manufacturer. But interest in model trains declined in the postwar period with the decline in passenger travel, rise of automobiles, and development of the space program. Despite efforts, the company continued to lose money.

Cowen retired in 1959, selling his 55,000 shares of Lionel stock to his grand-nephew Roy Cohn. He died on September 8, 1965, in Palm Beach, Florida. His body was returned to New York, where he is interred at Union Field Cemetery in Ridgewood, Queens.

== Marriage and family ==
In 1905 he married Cecilia Liberman, known as "Mimia". They had two children together. After her death in 1946, he later married again, to Lillian (Appel) Herman in 1949.
