= Lionel Corporation =

American toy company

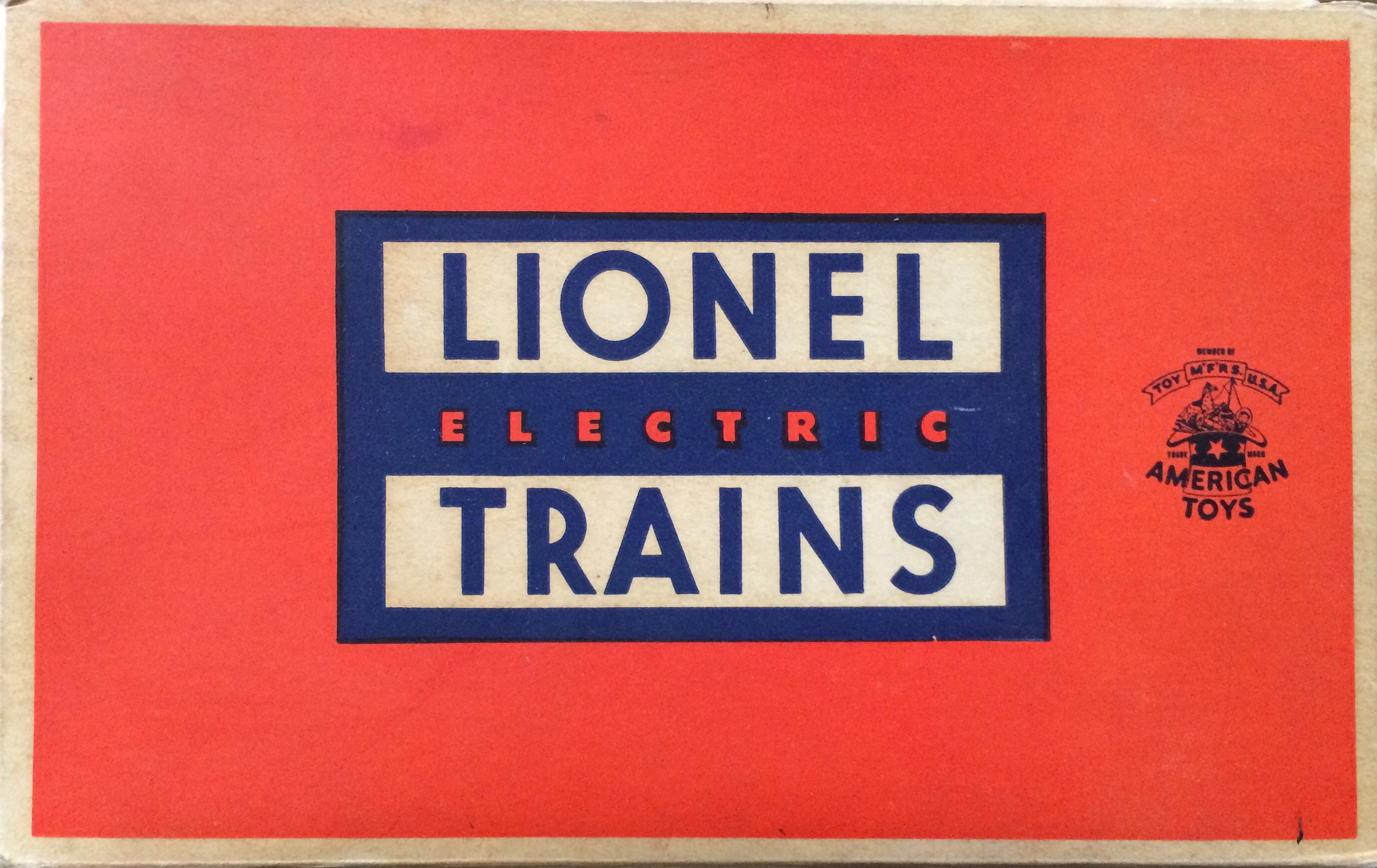
- Lionel logo on a box from the 1950s
- Type: Public company
- Industry: Manufacturing and retail
- Founded: 1900
- Defunct: 1993
- Fate: Sold rights, liquidation
- Successor: Lionel, LLC
- Headquarters: New York, New York, U.S.
- Key people: Joshua Lionel Cowen (co-founder), Harry C. Grant (co-founder) 1900–1959; Roy Cohn 1960–1964
- Products: Electric trains and accessories

Lionel Corporation was an American toy manufacturer and holding company of retailers that was founded in 1900 and operated for more than 120 years. It started as an electrical novelties company. Lionel specialized in various products throughout its existence. Toy trains and model railroads were its main claim to fame. Lionel trains have been produced since 1900, and their trains were admired by model railroaders around the world for the solidity of their construction and the authenticity of their detail. During its peak years in the 1950s, the company sold $25 million worth of trains per year.

In 1969, the company sold their model train lines to General Mills. It continued to operate until 1993 as a holding company for their toy stores. In 2006, Lionel's electric train became the first electric toy inducted into the National Toy Hall of Fame. The model trains are still in production, sold by Lionel Corporation's present-day successor company Lionel, LLC.

== History ==
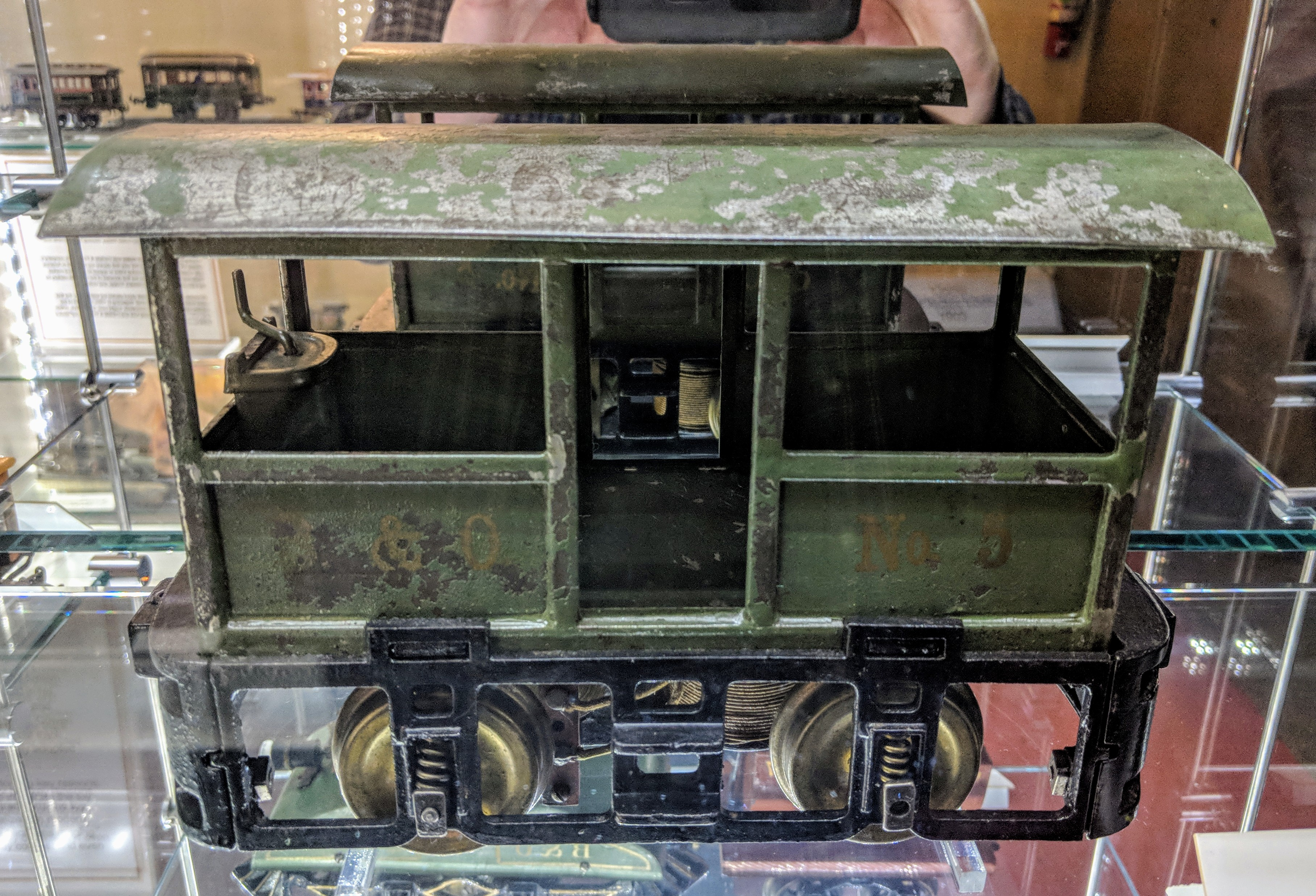
Lionel No. 100 Electric Locomotive, 1903-1905

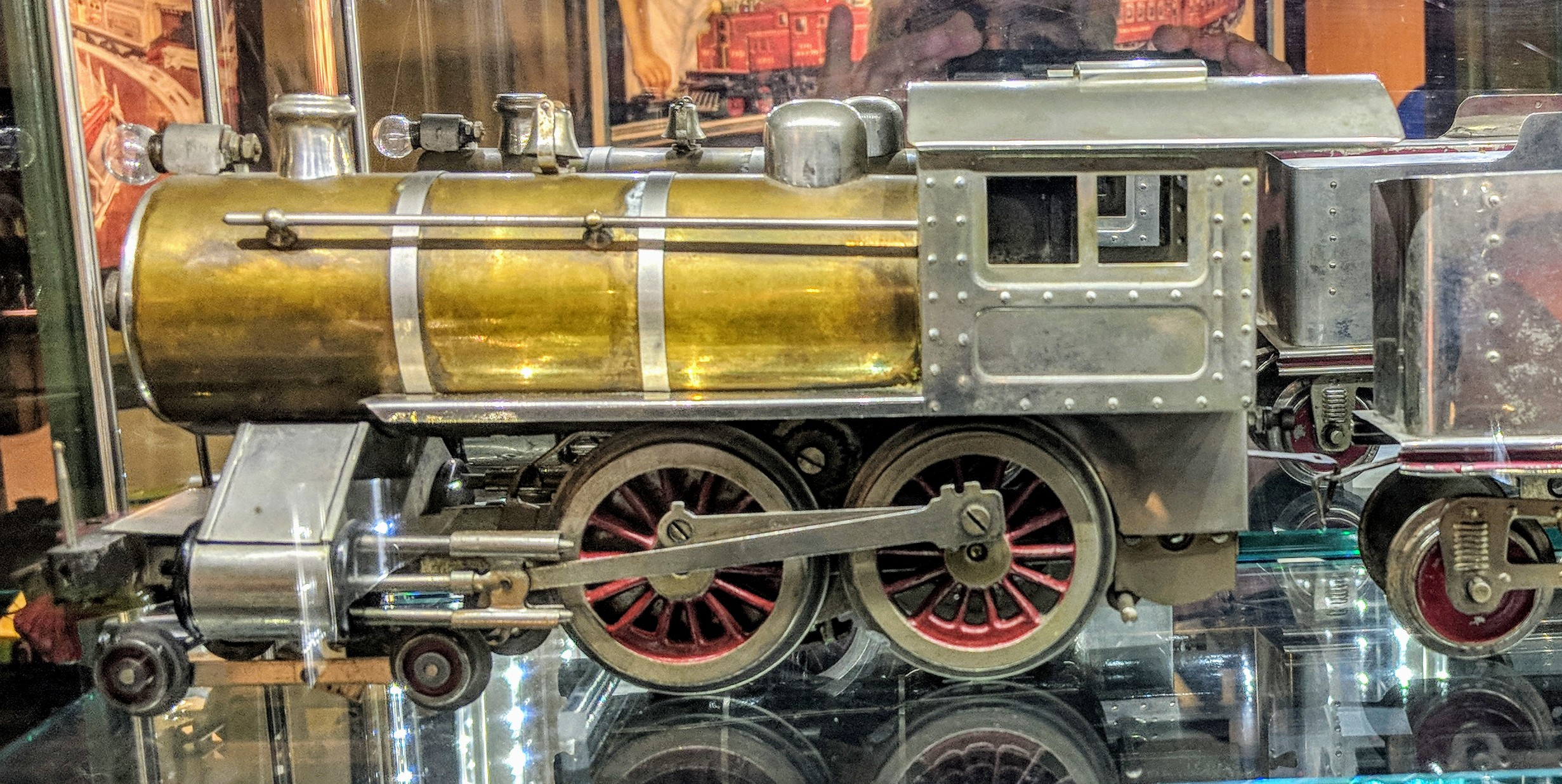
Lionel No. 7 Locomotive, 1918-1923

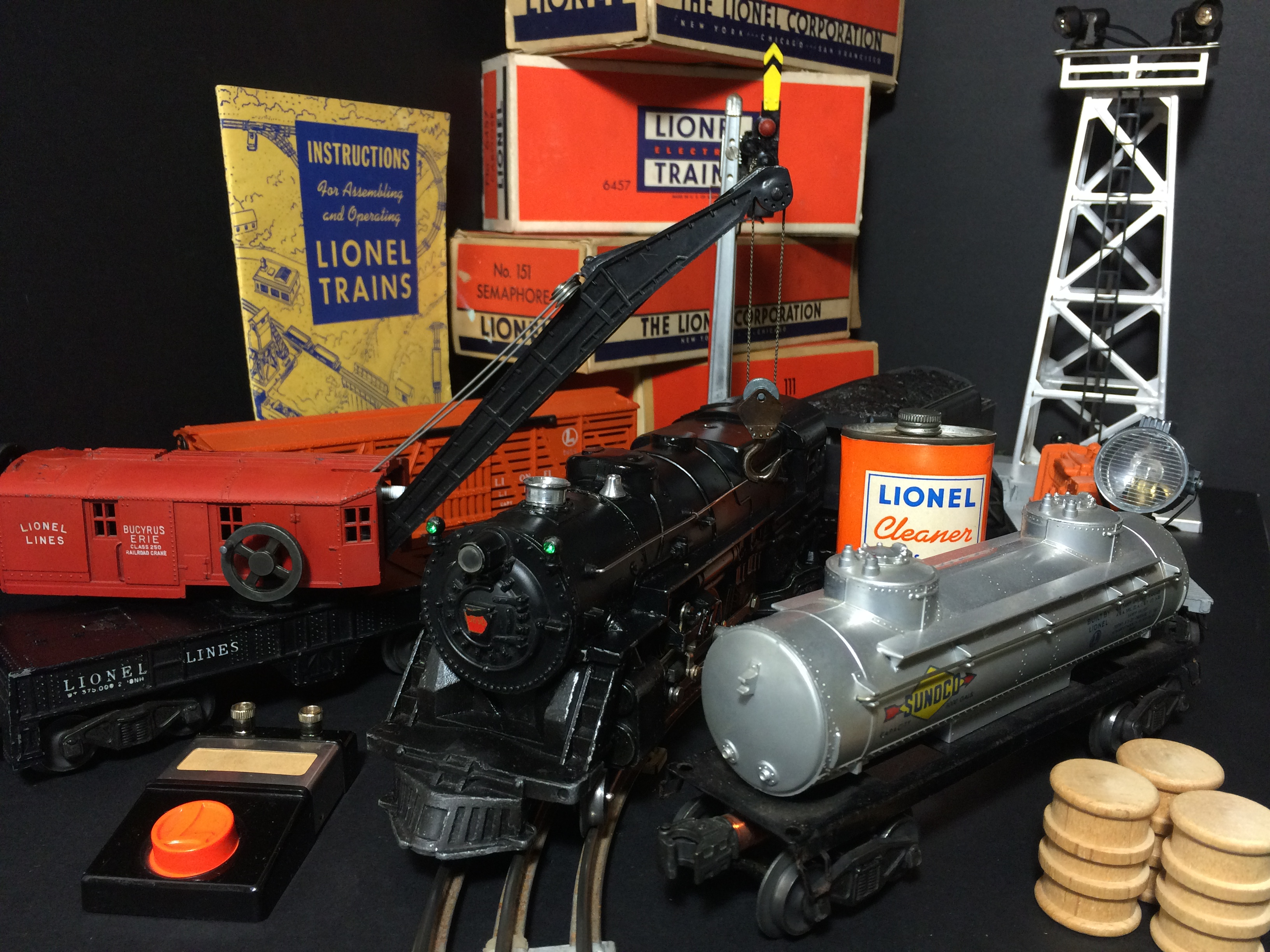
Lionel Corporation products

The original Lionel Corporation was founded in 1900 by Joshua Lionel Cowen and Harry C. Grant in New York City. The company's devotees disagree over the date of incorporation: the official paperwork is dated September 5, but the paperwork was not filed until September 22, more than two weeks later. Initially, the company specialized in electrical novelties, such as fans and lighting devices.

=== Pre-World War II era (1900–1942) ===
Lionel's first train, the Electric Express, was long thought by historians to have been intended for use as a storefront display, rather than for sale to consumers. Delivered in December 1900, it operated on a brass track and was powered by a battery and a motor that Cowen had intended to use for an electric fan. Cowen hoped the public's fascination with railroads and electricity would draw attention to his other goods for sale. Instead, the public approached store owners about buying trains, prompting Lionel to begin making toy trains for the general public. Lionel sold 12 examples of the Electric Express.

More recently, Greenberg's Guide to Lionel Trains (2014) concluded differently: it said that the first Lionel product was the motorized Converse Trolley, with the Electric Express being made to diversify the motor's use.

Lionel's earliest trains were larger than the sizes commonly available today, running on two-rail tracks with the rails 2 7/8 inches apart. In 1906, Lionel began offering a three-rail track that simplified wiring of reverse loops and accessories. Its outer rails were 2 1/8 inches apart, which did not match any of the existing standards that other manufacturers had been using since 1891. Whether this was an accidental misreading of Märklin's 2 gauge specifications or an intentional incompatibility is unclear.

Lionel marketed the non-standard track as "The Standard of the World," soon adopted the name in catalogs as Standard Gauge, and trademarked the name. When other U.S. companies began using Lionel's standard, they usually called it wide gauge. Starting in 1915, Lionel followed most of its U.S. competitors and adopted the smaller O gauge standard for its budget-level trains.

During the pre-Great War era, Lionel competed with Ives Manufacturing Company, Boucher Manufacturing Company, Dorfan, Louis Marx and Company and American Flyer.

By the end of World War I, Lionel was one of three major U.S. toy train manufacturers; the others were American Flyer and Louis Marx and Company. Cowen convinced department stores to incorporate his toy trains in their Christmas displays, linking toy trains to the holiday, and making them popular Christmas presents. Lionel made its trains larger than those of its competitors, making them appear a better value. Competitors criticized the lack of realism of Lionel's trains. Cowen had been unwilling to invest in the equipment necessary for lithography, so its early offerings were simply painted in solid colors of enamel paint with brass detail parts. Lionel responded by targeting advertising at children, telling them its products were the most realistic toy trains. Additionally, Lionel criticized the durability of competitors' products in ads targeted at parents.

By 1922, Lionel was competing mainly against American Flyer and Ives Manufacturing Company . Also in 1922, Boucher bought out Voltamp and started making what was known as the "Rolls-Royce" of standard gauge trains. In 1925, American Flyer jumped into the standard gauge market; and by 1926, Dorfan started making their own standard gauge trains as well.

William Walthers, a large seller of model railroads, asked Cowen in 1929 why Lionel painted its trains in bright and unrealistic colors. Cowen said that the majority of trains were purchased by mothers for their children, and the bright colors attracted women buyers. In 1929, Lionel opened a factory in Hillside, New Jersey, where it produced trains until 1974.

By the 1920s, Lionel had overcome Ives to become the market leader, selling metal trains with colorful paint schemes. Lionel's fierce ad campaigning took a toll on Ives, which filed bankruptcy in 1928. Lionel and American Flyer bought Ives and operated it jointly until 1930, when Lionel bought Flyer's share outright, causing Lionel to operate Ives as a subsidiary until 1932.

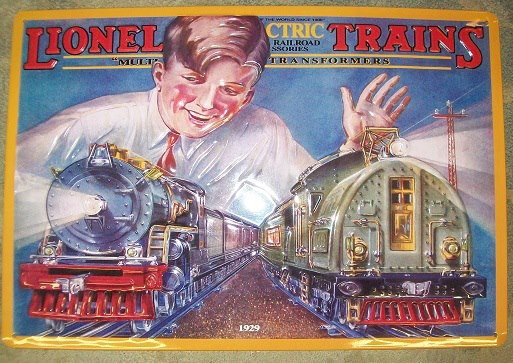
Lionel advertisement from 1929

The Great Depression badly hurt Lionel and other toy companies. In 1930, Lionel's operating profit dropped to $82,000 - its operating profit in 1927 had been more than $500,000 - and in 1931, it lost $207,000. The trains were considered a luxury item. At the height of the Depression, one of Lionel's more extravagant locomotives cost as much as a used Ford Model T. In an effort to compete with companies that were willing to undercut Lionel's prices, without diluting its premium Lionel and Ives brands, Lionel introduced a line of inexpensive electric toy trains under the Winner Toys' or Winner Toy Corp. brand name, which were sold from 1930 to 1932. The starting price for a set, which included a transformer, was $3.25. These and other efforts to improve its financial standing were unable to keep Lionel from going into receivership in May 1934.

The product widely credited with saving the company was a wind-up handcar featuring Mickey and Minnie Mouse, which operated on O gauge track and sold for $1. Lionel manufactured 250,000 units, but was still unable to keep up with demand. But at a wholesale price of .55 cents, the handcar's sales did not provide enough profit to pay off Lionel's debts of $300,000; however, the model did provide much-needed cash. It was the success of the more expensive but profitable 752E City of Portland Union Pacific Streamliner that gave the company much needed revenue. As Lionel's first scale-model, the Streamliner gave the company considerable presence in the model market. It was the start of the company's scale-detailed, die-cast look. While numerous equally successful streamliners were issued in the following years, the handcar experiment was not repeated. Lionel left the novelty market to the cheaper toy manufacturers.

Lionel avoided bankruptcy and emerged from receivership the next year. By 1939, Lionel had discontinued its standard gauge products, concentrating instead on the more-affordable (and lucrative) O-gauge and OO gauge, which it had introduced in 1938.

Lionel ceased toy production in 1942 to produce nautical items for the United States Navy during World War II. During this period, Lionel produced ads aimed at American teenagers, to begin planning their post-war layouts. Lionel also introduced the so-called Lionel Wartime Freight Train, a detailed set of cut-and-fold models of Lionel trains printed on cardstock. These were notoriously difficult to put together.

==== Models ====
Lionel made many models, including scale models, of actual trains. The Red Comet and Blue Streak sets included models of New York Central's Commodore Vanderbilt locomotive. In 1934, Lionel made a 1:45 scale model of Union Pacific's M10000 diesel streamliner (also called the City of Denver) that runs on O gauge track. It was followed by a model of this diesel's successor, the City of Portland. The 763E and 700E are 1:48 scale models of 4-6-4 Hudsons. In 1938, Lionel made a model of Chicago, Burlington and Quincy Railroad's Burlington Zephyr streamliner called the Flying Yankee.

=== Post-war era (1945–1969) ===
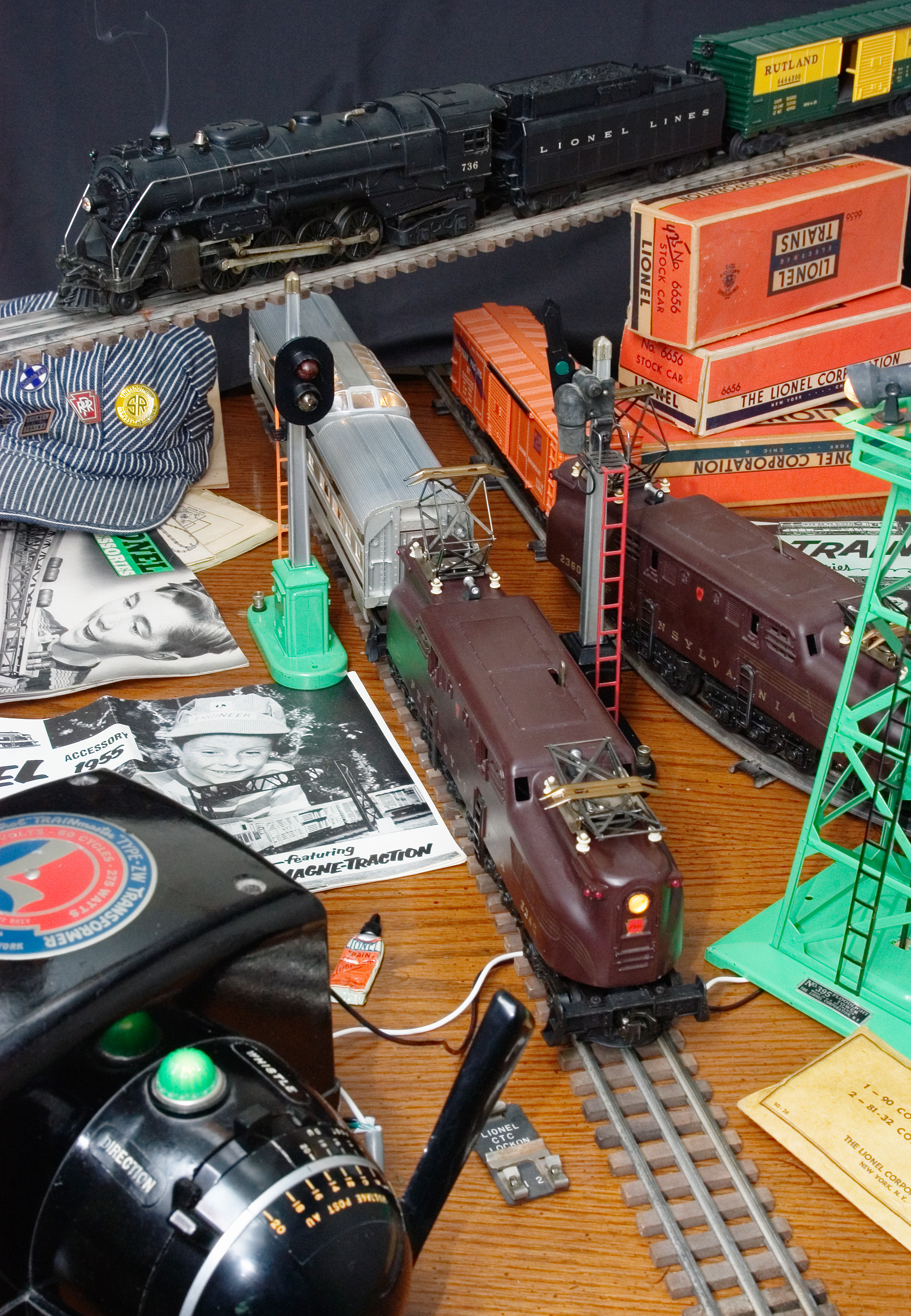
Post-war Lionel trains and accessories

Lionel resumed producing toy trains in late 1945, replacing their original product line with less colorful, but more realistic, trains and concentrating exclusively on O-gauge trains.

Many of Lionel's steam locomotives of this period, had a new feature: smoke, produced by dropping a small tablet or a special oil into the locomotive's smokestack, which contained an electric heating element. Many diesel, electric, and steam engines made after 1950 had Lionel's Magne-Traction, which made the wheels magnetic in order to grip the track better. Lionel's most popular toy train ever mass-produced was the Santa Fe F3, numbered 2333, released in 1948.

By 1953, Lionel sales reached their highest level at over $32 million. During the same year, Lionel reportedly became the world's largest toy manufacturer. As the 1950s progressed, Lionel sales began to decline in proportion to the growing prevalence of space and military-themed toys and slot car racing sets. These changes coincided with the decline in rail travel as private automobiles proliferated, and the launching of Sputnik, which began the space-race between the United States and Soviet Union. There was an associated military build-up as the Cold War progressed after World War II. The remaining interest in toy and model trains that existed was geared toward HO scale, which gradually overtook O gauge in popularity. It had more realistic detailing and its smaller size enabled the enthusiast to do more modelling within the same amount of space. Lionel attempted to keep pace with changing trends by offering space and military-themed train sets, and introducing their own HO line of trains. But they were never able to reclaim the market share they once held in the toy industry, and by 1958 reported a net loss of $469,057.

Company founder Joshua Cowen officially retired that same year. On September 8, 1965, Cowen died at the age of 88 in Palm Beach, Florida.

Beginning in the 1960s, Lionel attempted to diversify into other product lines, such as phonographs, science, weather station and plastics engineering kits. Toy train sales continued to decline and the company endured a series of management turnovers. In 1967 Lionel purchased American Flyer trains from bankrupt A. C. Gilbert Company, but did not have a new catalog for that year.

In December 1968 Ronald Saypol, Joshua Cowen's former grandson-in-law, became President and CEO of the Lionel Corporation, and in the following year, in an attempt to divest the company of what was by then determined to be a cash drain by the board and shareholders, began negotiations to sell their toy train line and lease the Lionel name to Model Products Corporation (MPC), a subsidiary of General Mills, Inc. 1969 was the final year the Lionel Corporation published a toy train catalog and manufactured O gauge trains.

==== Models ====
Lionel started the postwar period in 1945 with a train set introducing remote-control uncoupling. The locomotive was the 224, a pre-war carryover 2-6-2 Prairie type. In 1947, Lionel produced a model of the Pennsylvania Railroad's GG1. One year later, Lionel began production of their famous Santa Fe F3. As a direct descendant of the pre-war 763E locomotive, in 1950, Lionel released the 773, another scale Hudson. The Lionel FA model was also introduced in 1950.

Many collectors and operators ranked the 746, released in 1957, as the best postwar Lionel locomotive. It is a model of Norfolk and Western's J class steam engine. During both the pre-war and post-war eras, Lionel made many models of electric locomotives; during the post-war era, Lionel made models of the EP-5 and Virginian EL-C, in addition to the GG1. From 1946 through 1949, Lionel issued the 726 2-8-4 Berkshire, which is a prized item today. From 1950 to 1951, Lionel produced the 736 Berkshire, which was basically a 726 with Magne-Traction. In 1952, the Korean war caused a shortage of magnetic materials, so Lionel reissued the 726 as the 726rr (726 rerun). From 1953 until 1968, Lionel produced the 736 again.

==== Construction set ====
During the post-war period, Lionel produced a construction set, using a unique component set. While competitive sets used nut and bolt fasteners, the Lionel set employed round-head aircraft rivets retained with rubber grommets, eliminating the need for tools. The structural elements were hollow beams of square cross section made from folded and quite thin sheet aluminum. It was subject to destruction if stepped upon. A more substantial folded aluminum base plate was used to form the foundation of most constructions, and additional circular plates could be used to construct larger wheels or pivots. Pulleys, gussets, and splices were also included. The deluxe kits included an electric AC motor with a worm drive and reduction gearset that was powered from household power. While innovative, the lack of general purpose beam members with enough holes limited the adaptability of the set to complex constructions. Finished assemblies also lacked the robust durability of its principal competition at the time, the Erector Set.

==== Outsells American Flyer ====
During the 1950s, Lionel outsold its closest competitor, American Flyer, by nearly 2:1, peaking in 1953. Some Lionel company histories say Lionel (including more than just trains) was the largest toy company in the world by the early 1950s. Had that been the case, it was a short-lived greatness: Lionel's 1955 sales were some $23 million, while rival Marx's toy (more than just trains) sales were $50 million.

The 1946–1956 decade was Lionel's golden age. The Lionel Santa Fe 2333 Diesel locomotive, an EMD F3 in the colorful Santa Fe "Warbonnet" paint scheme that was introduced in 1948, became the Lionel company icon and the icon of the era. The 2343, 2383, and 2353 Santa Fe F3s improved on it. Lionel declined rapidly after 1956. Hobbyists preferred the smaller but more realistic HO scale trains, and children's interest shifted from toy trains to toy cars. The shift caught Lionel off guard, and in 1957, they hastily introduced a line of HO-scale trains licensed from Rivarossi and a line of slot car racing sets. Neither product line was as popular as its O-gauge trains. Efforts to increase train set profitability and/or sales by cheaper manufacture (largely by replacing castings and folded sheet metal with unpainted injected-molded colored plastic) were largely unsuccessful; 1957 was Lionel's last profitable post-war year.

In 1959, Cowen and son sold their interest in the Lionel company and retired. The buyer was Cowen's grandnephew, Roy Cohn (businessman and attorney to Senator Joseph McCarthy) who replaced most of Cowen's management. The business direction of the Lionel company changed: it added subsidiary companies unrelated to toy train sets — among them were Dale Electronics, Sterling Electric Motors, and Telerad Manufacturing. During Cohn's unsuccessful three-and-a-half-year tenure, Lionel lost more than US$13 million. In 1963, Cohn was forced to resign from the company after losing a proxy fight.

==== Diversification ====
As part of the diversification, Lionel formed a relationship with the Porter Chemical Company, whose owner, Harold M. Porter, was a member of the Lionel Board of Directors. Lionel began making a variety of scientifically oriented, hands-on educational toys, designated "Lionel-Porter." The product line, cataloged from 1961 to 1968, included Chemcraft chemistry sets, Microcraft microscope sets, Biocraft biology sets, and sets teaching about mineralogy, physics, geology, mathematics, and industrial science, along with a junior line of tool sets.

==== Decline and bankruptcy ====
Lionel's efforts to diversify failed to compensate for the public's declining interest in its toy trains. By 1966, Lionel's revenue was $28 million, 40 percent from government contracts. Meanwhile, Lionel's closest competitor was also fading: in January 1967, the parent company of rival American Flyer, the A. C. Gilbert Company, went bankrupt. Lionel bought the American Flyer brand name and product line in May of that year in a $150,000 deal; however, Lionel lacked the money to exploit them and filed bankruptcy less than four months later, on August 7, 1967.

In 1969, Lionel's sales had declined to just over $1 million per year. Lionel sold the product die tooling for its struggling train line and leased the rights to the Lionel brand name to the cereal company General Mills. The Lionel brand name continues today, owned by Lionel, LLC. But many Lionel train enthusiasts consider 1969 the end of the "true Lionel trains", due to the original Lionel Corporation divesting itself of toy train production and the changes in design and manufacture, sometimes for the worse, that took place under Lionel trains' new owners.

=== As a holding company (1970–1993) ===
After the Lionel Corporation sold the rights to manufacture trains to General Mills in 1969, the Modern Era began the following year with train products being reproduced and introduced. The Lionel Corporation would continue as a holding company. It invested in various chains of retail stores and electronics companies while receiving royalties on toy train sales made by General Mills (later Lionel Trains, Inc.). In 1991, it sold its trademarks to Lionel Trains, Inc. for $10 million and eventually went out of business in 1993.

==== Lionel MPC (1970–1986) ====
In 1970, after tooling purchased from the Lionel Corporation was moved to a new factory in Mt. Clemens, Michigan, limited production of Lionel trains as a new product line under MPC began. Rolling stock debuted with "fast-angle wheels" with needlepoint bearings. This new wheel design, coupled with the use of Delrin plastic trucks, reduced rolling friction that allowed for longer trains to be run and is still in use by Lionel today. Lionel also began to offer trains in a wider variety of road names and colors and with improved graphics that were not previously available during the postwar period.

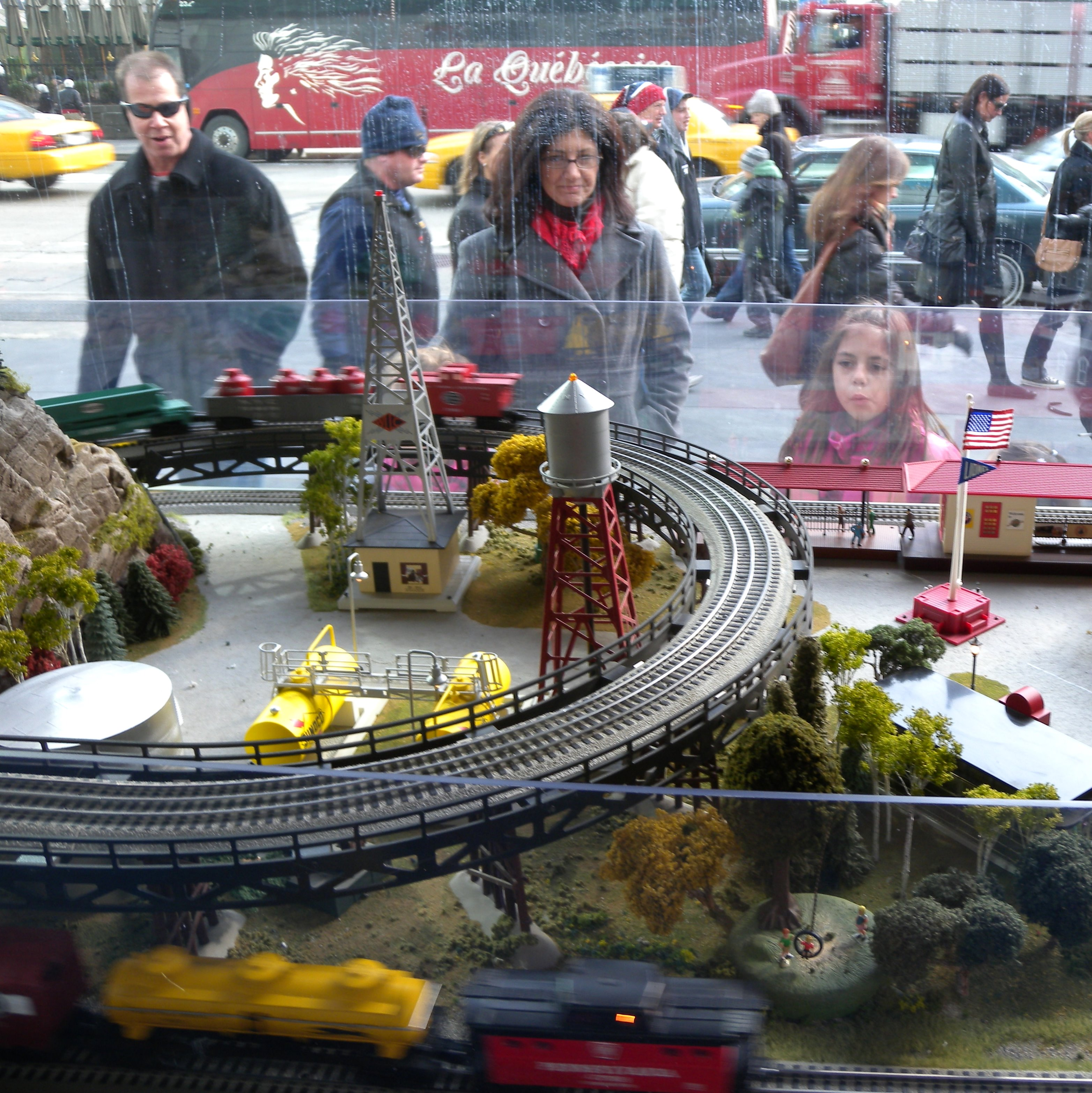
A Lionel O gauge layout in New York City

In 1971, Lionel debuted a new electronic sound system in their engines, called "Mighty Sound of Steam," to replace the electro-mechanical air whistles of the pre-war and post-war eras. An internal reorganization in 1973 caused Lionel to become part of General Mills' Fundimensions group. A new line of scale-sized freight cars, called "Standard O", was introduced that same year. The new line of trains included the Blue Streak Freight, an entry-level O-27 gauge train set produced by Lionel. The set included a blue Jersey Central Lines steam locomotive with a 2-4-2 wheel configuration and attached tender car. Lionel integrated several features into the locomotive, including a working headlight and a smoke unit. In 1974, Lionel began to offer trains in HO scale for the first time since the postwar period; they were last cataloged in 1966. In 1975, Lionel introduced a 75th anniversary freight set that consisted of their U36B diesel engine and rolling stock that included images of catalog covers and logos from Lionel's past. One year later, Lionel released a model of the American Freedom Train to celebrate the nation's bicentennial.

The brand rose to prominence in 1976 following a series of television commercials featuring Johnny Cash, who was a longtime Lionel collector.

In 1979, Lionel re-issued the Fairbanks-Morse Train Master diesel locomotive and re-introduced the American Flyer S gauge line of trains, both of which had not been produced since 1966. Starting in the 1980s, Lionel began to issue more postwar-derived operating accessories, such as the Lumber Mill, Ice Depot, and News Stand. In 1984, they released the 783 Hudson locomotive, which descended from the 773 scale-sized Hudson originally made in 1950 and again in the 1960s.

==== Lionel, LLC (1986–present) ====
In 1985, General Mills spun off its Kenner-Parker division, with Lionel being placed under Kenner-Parker. In 1986, Lionel was sold again, this time to toy train collector and real estate developer Richard P. Kughn of Detroit, Michigan; it became Lionel Trains Inc (LTI). In 1989, Lionel phased out the Mighty Sound of Steam and replaced it with what would eventually be called "RailSounds," beginning with their re-issue of the pre-war B6 Pennsylvania switcher. It was rebranded as Lionel LLC in 1995. Lionel, LLC owns all trademarks and most of the rights associated with the Lionel Corporation.

==== Lionel Morsan ====
In the early 1970s Lionel bought Morsan Tents from founder Mort Jarashaw. It was a small chain of sporting goods stores based in New Jersey, which became Lionel Morsan.

=== Bankruptcy and buyout ===
After the sale of its train product lines in 1969, Lionel Corporation became a holding company that specialized in toy stores. By the early 1980s, Lionel operated some 150 stores, under the names Lionel Kiddie City, Lionel Playworld, and Lionel Toy Warehouse. For a time it was the second-largest toy store chain in the United States. Lionel entered financial troubles during the early 1980s recession and filed for Chapter 11 bankruptcy in February 1982. After reducing to 55 stores, it emerged from bankruptcy in September 1985.

By 1991, the chain had regrown to 100 stores and was the fourth-largest toy retailer in the country, but it encountered financial troubles due to a combination of factors. In 1989, Robert I. Toussie L.P., a partnership of several retail executives, attempted to buy the company. Lionel resisted and the fight drained the company of cash. Meanwhile, non-specialty discount stores expanded their toy sections and undercut the prices of specialty toy chains. Additionally, Lionel found it difficult to compete on price with the larger Toys "R" Us, and it attempted to expand too rapidly in a weakened economy. After a string of unprofitable quarters, it filed for Chapter 11 bankruptcy on June 14, 1991. In 1992, Lionel again tried to reverse its fortunes by merging with the bankrupt Child World, the United States' #3 toy retailer, but was unable to secure financing. By February 1993, Lionel had closed all but 29 stores in six states, concentrating on the markets of Philadelphia, central New Jersey, Baltimore, Washington, D.C., Cleveland, and south Florida. Unable to reach an agreement for reorganization with its creditors, on June 2, 1993, Lionel announced its intention to liquidate all of its stores and go out of business.

The Lionel trademarks were purchased by Richard Kughn, the Detroit real estate magnate who had bought the Lionel product line from General Mills in 1986. See Lionel, LLC.

Lionel trains were manufactured from 1920 to 1929 in a factory at 605 21st Street in Irvington, New Jersey. The factory was destroyed by a fire on April 5, 2004. According to a report from the local fire department, 100 firefighters were needed to extinguish the blaze. The building had been vacant for ten years and was in a state of disrepair, according to Fire Chief Don Huber.

Trains were manufactured from 1929 to 1974 in the Lionel factory at 28 Sager Place in Hillside, New Jersey. Photos of both New Jersey factories in derelict state prior to their demise can be seen at the ihorse.com Web site. The building that housed the last Lionel office is located at 26750 23 Mile Road, Chesterfield, Michigan; as of March 31, 2017, the building was available for lease. The former Lionel assembly factory was located at 50625 Richard W. Blvd, Chesterfield — a short drive from the office building.

== Games licensed by Lionel Corporation ==
- Lionel Trains: On Track: Nintendo DS game
- 3D Ultra Lionel Traintown (and its sequel, Deluxe): Windows game
- Lionel Trains Presents Trans-con!: Windows 95/98
