= Edward Ives (toymaker) =

- Born: Edward Riley Ives; September 13, 1839
- Died: 1918 (aged 78–79)
- Occupation: Toymaker

Edward Riley Ives (September 13, 1839 – 1918) was an American toymaker from Connecticut. He married Jane Maria "Jennie" Blakeslee in 1866, and with the help of his father-in-law and brother-in-law, he founded the Ives Manufacturing Company two years later in 1868 in Plymouth, Connecticut. It became one of the largest toy companies in the United States during the 19th century and the early decades of the 20th century. He held several patents on various toy mechanisms, such as a cap exploder for toy cannons.

Late in his career, Ives turned the company over to his son, Harry Ives. Another son, Edward Lee Ives, was an engineer and steel plant superintendent in Chicago. Ives died in 1918, at age 79. Toys made by Ives' company remained collectible for decades after his death.

Edward Ives was a distant cousin of U.S. classical music composer Charles Edward Ives. Ives and his son were the subject of a biography titled Messrs. Ives of Bridgeport, written by Louis Hertz and published in 1950.
