= All Metal Products Company =

American toy company, 1920–1957

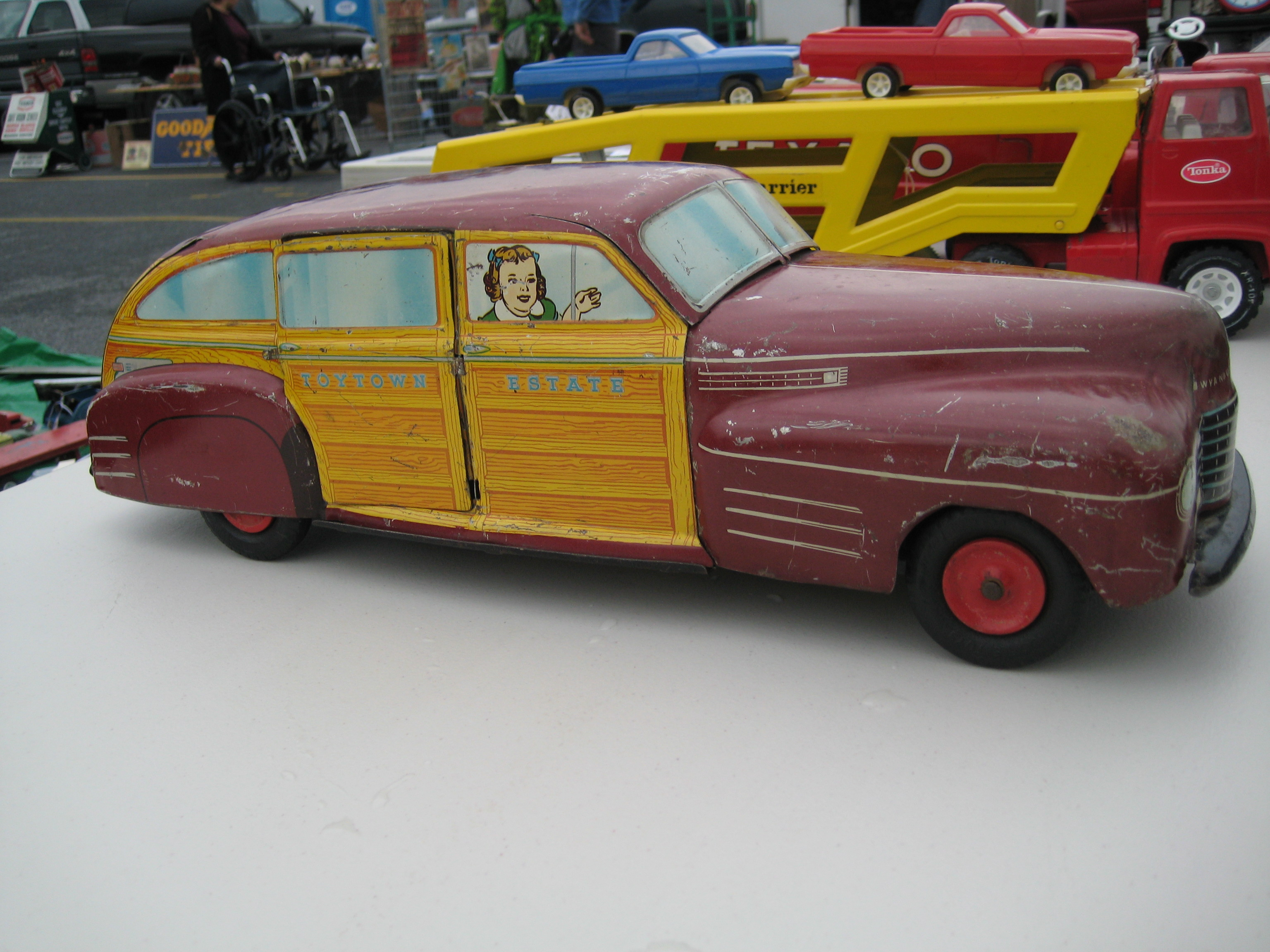
Tin toy car, Toytown line, Wyandotte Toys

All Metal Products Company was an American toy company founded in 1920 and based in Wyandotte, Michigan for most of its history. It produced inexpensive pressed metal toys under the Wyandotte brand name, and was the largest manufacturer of toy guns in the US for several decades in the 20th century. The company's slogan was "Wyandotte Toys are Good and Safe." To keep costs down, the company used scrap and surplus raw materials whenever possible, often manufacturing their toys from scrap metal obtained from local auto factories.

== History ==
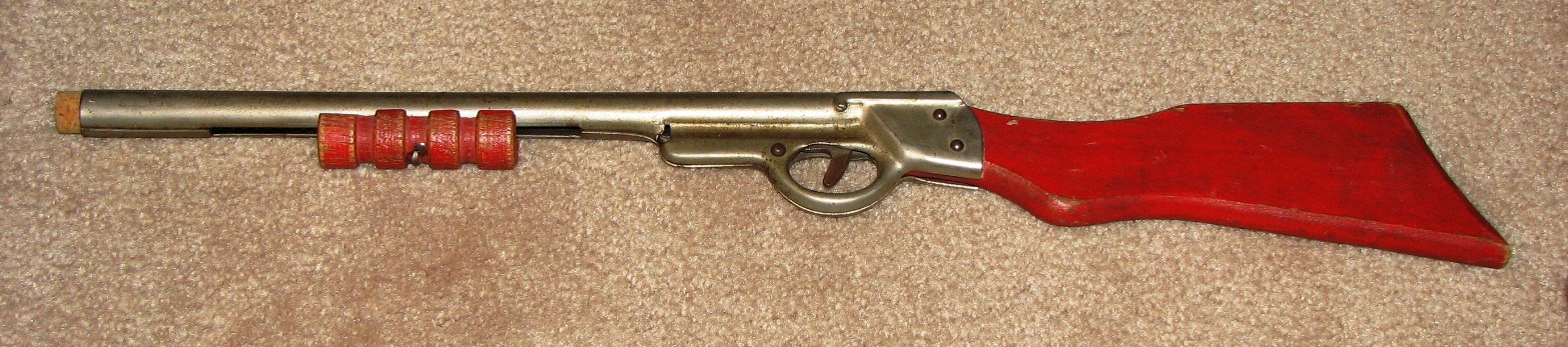
1950s vintage toy cork rifle ("pop gun")

Initially, All Metal Products Company specialized in toy guns, including pop guns, water pistols, and air rifles. Their slogan in the 1920s was "Every Boy Wants a Pop Gun." By 1927, the company had become the world's largest manufacturer of toy guns. Wyandotte Toys stopped manufacturing air rifles in 1929 but continued to dominate the toy gun market throughout the remainder of its history by producing pop guns, clicker pistols, dart guns and pistols, cap guns, and a variety of plastic pistols.

In 1929, the company added girls' toys and toy vehicles, as well as lithographed novelty toys in 1936. Metal toys were banned during World War II because metals were needed for the war effort. The company survived by producing wooden toys and die-cut cardboard "build-your-own" play sets during the war. All Metal Products also manufactured en bloc clips for the M1 Garand rifle; clips of this type were stamped with "AMP1" on the rear.

In 1948, die-cast and plastic toys were added to the Wyandotte line, allowing the company to compete with other manufacturers that sold inexpensive dime store-type toys at lower prices than Wyandotte's pressed-metal toys. In 1946, All Metal Products Company purchased the Hafner Manufacturing Company, the maker of "Hafner Clockwork" pressed-metal toy trains.

In the early 1950s, All Metal Products Company moved from its site on Sycamore and 14th Street in Wyandotte to Ohio, hoping that closer proximity to Ohio's steel mills and lower labor costs would help reduce expenses. However, this effort was not enough to prevent the company from going bankrupt in 1956, resulting in the sale of part of its product line, including the former Hafner trains, to competitor Louis Marx and Company. What remained of the company attempted a comeback in 1957 but ultimately failed.

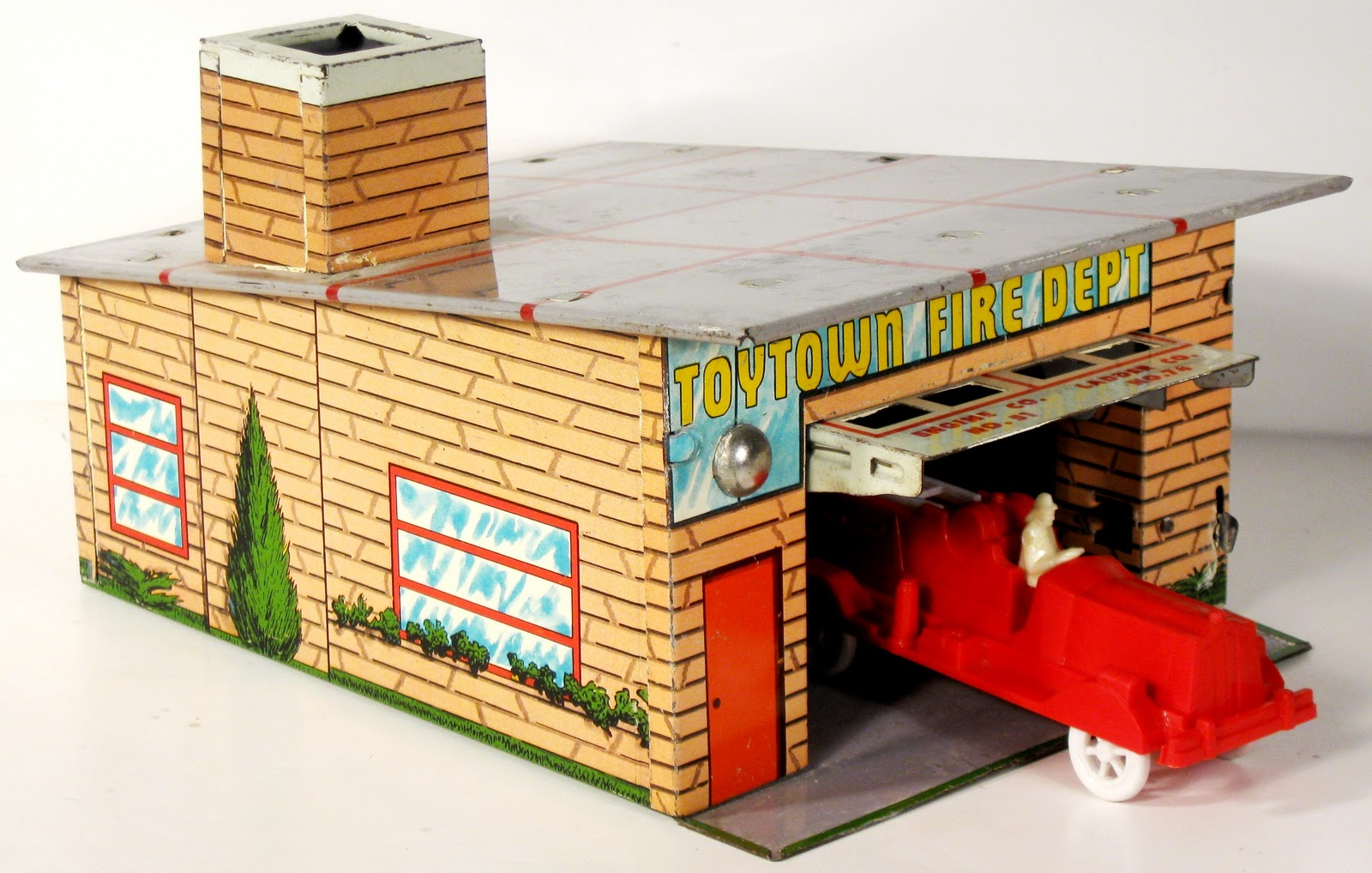
Wyandotte Toytown fire station
