= G. Sommers & Co. =

American wholesale catalog retailer

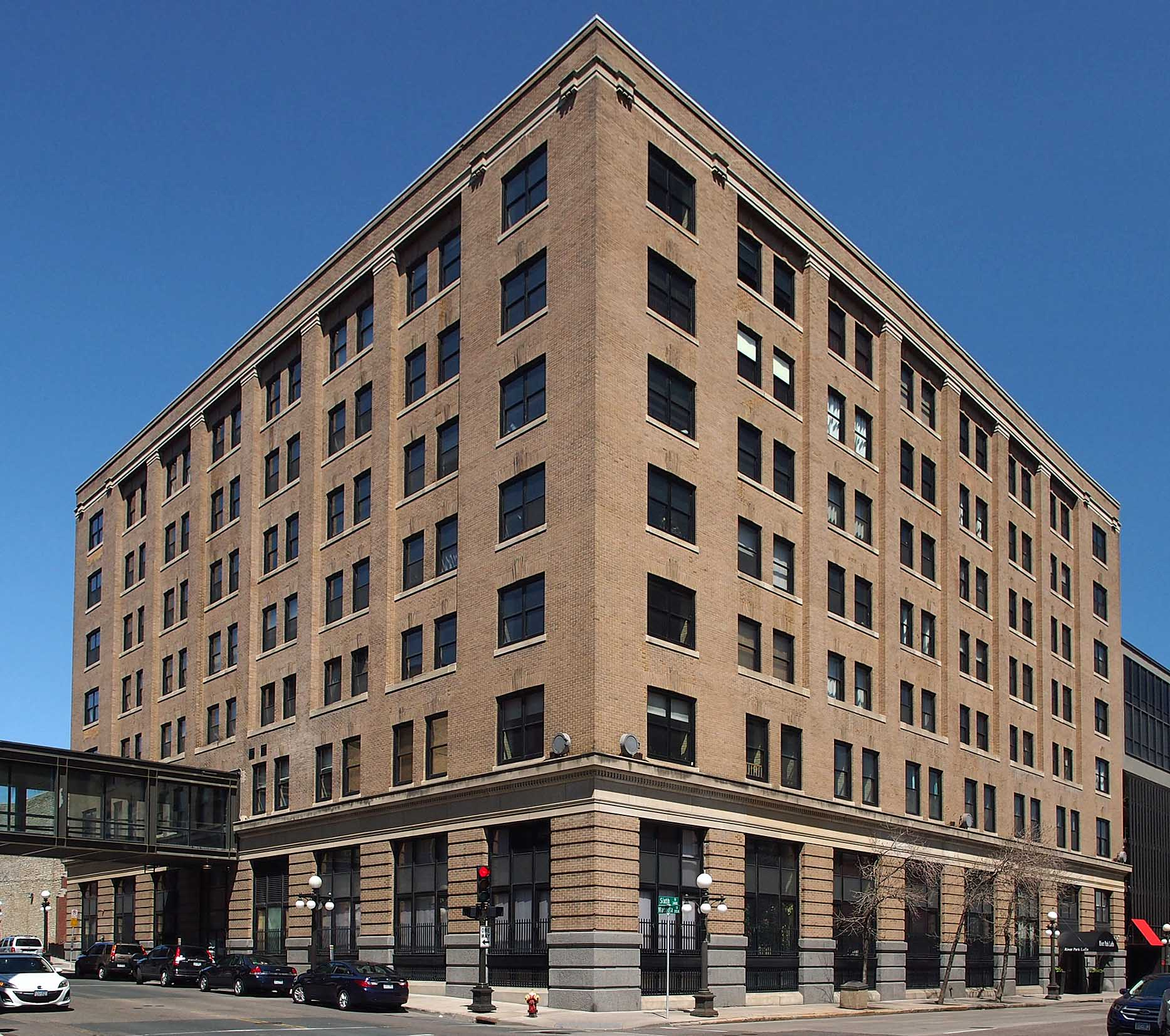
The company building on 6th & Wacouta Streets in St. Paul in 2015.

G. Sommers & Co. was an American wholesale catalog retailer based in Minneapolis, Minnesota. The above may be inaccurate, since one of their main offices was at 6th and Wacouta Streets in St. Paul, Minnesota according to a paper weight the company gave out with a picture of the store on it. The Company was founded as B. Sommers & Co. in 1882, and was in business until 1940. At the turn of the 20th century, it was one of the largest businesses of its kind in the United States, with an area of distribution ranging from the Great Lakes west to the Pacific Ocean and from the border of Canada to San Francisco, California.
