= Best of the West (disambiguation) =

Best of the West is an American sitcom.

Best of the West may also refer to:

- Best of the West (action figures), a name for an action figure by a toy manufacturer
- Best of the West (album), a 1987 album by Riders in the Sky
- Best of the West (comics), a series of western comics by AC Comics
- The Best of the West, a 2002 album by Rednex
