= Project Harvest Moon =

Effort by private individuals to explore and exploit the Moon

Project Harvest Moon was a first effort by private individuals to explore and exploit the Moon. Sponsored by the Committee for the Future, "the original space advocacy organization in the NASA era", Harvest Moon would have used a leftover Saturn rocket and lunar module to conduct experiments on the Moon, paid for by the sale of lunar materials retrieved from the Moon's surface. The Committee for the Future was founded and propelled by Barbara Marx Hubbard, daughter of wealthy toy manufacturer Louis Marx. Hubbard received support from retired military officers, former NASA employees, and prominent industrialists. On May 11, 1972, Rep. Olin Teague (D-Tex) offered a Resolution in support, but the project was terminated that summer following cogent objections from NASA.

== Committee for the Future ==
The Committee for the Future was founded in 1970 by Barbara Marx Hubbard, its organizing director and prime mover, with headquarters in Lakeville, Connecticut. Her father, Louis Marx, provided advice to the committee and some funding. Other prominent members included its Chairman, Gen. Joseph S. Bleymaier, USAF-ret.; Executive Director John J. Whiteside, USAF-ret.; Richard Nolte, President, Thiokol; Dr. Harold W. Ritchey, Board Chairman, Thiokol; George Van Valkenburg, producer of the documentary, The Log of Apollo 7; diamond expert Ronald Winston; and John F. Yardley, Vice President of McDonnell Douglas. According to Whiteside, the committee's goals were "to develop within ten years a lunar community open to people of all nations as the next step in developing the solar system for man. At the same time to apply the most advanced systems and knowledge to overall earth problems." Harvest Moon was an outgrowth of these objectives.

== Mission ==
The mission of Harvest Moon was to use leftover Saturn rockets and lunar modules from the Apollo program's space flights to fly two astronauts to the Moon, where they would set up automated experiments that could be controlled from Earth, collect one to four hundred pounds of lunar rocks, and return to Earth. The collected material would be divided into tiny fragments and sold to the public. The cost to investors was estimated by the Wall Street firm of Donaldson, Lufkin & Jenrette to be $150–$250 million, but income could reach $400 million. Profits would go to charity. The mission would be controlled by NASA. In addition to the acquisition of lunar material, two experiments were proposed. The first, with an eventual Moon colony in mind, was a twenty-foot mylar dome under which plants, insects, and possibly small animals would be observed for their reaction to the two-week-long lunar day. The second experiment would be a lunar observatory which would provide remote-controlled fourteen-day exposures through the negligible lunar atmosphere. The privately funded International Lunar Observatory is a modern realization of the Harvest Moon proposal. The advantages of a Moon observatory had been discussed at the beginning of the space age by Willy Ley.

== Project history ==
Suggested by George Van Valkenburg in October 1970, Project Harvest Moon was developed by the New Worlds Company, and incorporated by the Committee for the Future in 1970. After the financial analysis by the brokerage firm of Donaldson, Lufkin & Jenrette, the project was publicized in the summer of 1971 and reviewed by independent newspapers and syndicated columnists such as Bob Considine. On March 9, 1972, the Project received a hearing by the House Subcommittee on Manned Flight, chaired by Rep. Olin Teague (D-Tex), a vocal supporter, who submitted a House Resolution asking NASA to "reserve a Saturn 5 rocket, a command service module, and a lunar module for possible use by a transnational mission". On July 18, however, a spokesman from NASA, which had remained indifferent to the project, reported that there were no serviceable lunar modules. Having terminated Harvest Moon, the Committee for the Future moved on to other space proposals.
