= Louis Marx =

American toy maker and businessman

- Born: August 11, 1896; Brooklyn, New York City, U.S.
- Died: February 5, 1982 (aged 85); White Plains, New York, U.S.
- Resting place: Woodlawn Cemetery, Bronx
- Other names: Louis Marx, Sr.
- Occupation: Businessman
- Years active: 1919–1972
- Title: Founder and owner of Louis Marx and Company
- Spouses: Irene (Renee) Freda Saltzman (m. 1927; died 1942) Idella Ruth Blackadder (m. 1947)
- Children: 9

Louis Marx (August 11, 1896 – February 5, 1982) was an American toy maker and businessman whose company, Louis Marx and Company, was the largest toy company in the world in the 1950s. He was described by some as an experienced businessman with the mind of child.

Marx was known by numerous nicknames, including "Toycoon," "the Henry Ford of the toy industry," "the hawk of the toy industry," and "the toy king of America."

== Biography ==
Born in Brooklyn, New York, to Austrian Jewish parents, Marx graduated from high school at age 15 and started his career working for Ferdinand Strauss, a manufacturer of mechanical toys. By 1916, Marx was managing Strauss' plant in East Rutherford, New Jersey, but was eventually voted out by Strauss' board of directors over a disagreement about retail sales practices.

Marx then entered the United States Army as a private and attained the rank of sergeant before returning to civilian life in 1918. Marx's passion for the Army was reflected throughout his life. Most of Marx's military toys represented Army equipment, and Marx would later make a practice of befriending generals and naming his sons after them.

Following military service, Marx then went to work selling for Newton and Thompson, a Vermont-based manufacturer of wood toys, where he redesigned their product line and increased the company's sales tenfold. In 1919, Marx and his brother David incorporated, founding the company that bore his name. Initially working as a middle man, Marx was soon able to purchase tooling to manufacture toys himself. When Strauss fell on hard financial times, Marx was able to buy the dies for two Strauss toys and turn them into best-sellers. By age 26, three years after founding his company, Marx was a millionaire. He was declared "Toy King of the World" in October 1937 in a London newspaper. By 1938, Marx employed 500 workers in the Dudley factory and 4000 in the American factories.

By utilizing techniques of mass production and revitalizing old designs as much as possible – Marx utilized some of his toy train tooling developed in the early 1930s until 1972 – Marx was able to sell a broad line of inexpensive toys. All US-made toy trains would come from a plant in Girard, Pennsylvania, which produced millions of lithographed tin and plastic toy trains.

By 1951, the Marx company had 12 factories worldwide. For much of the 1950s, it was the largest toy manufacturer in the world, with much of the success coming from Sears, Roebuck & Co. catalog sales and the many themed playsets available. As World War II drew to a close, Marx had toured Europe and acted as a consultant on how toy manufacturing could aid reconstruction efforts. Marx used the contacts he made in this manner to forge partnerships and open factories in Europe and Japan. Marx was featured on the cover of Time magazine on December 12, 1955, with his portrait eclipsing an image of Santa Claus, while examples of his toys swirl in the background.

The industrialist retired in 1972, selling his company to Quaker Oats for $54 million. Marx was 76 years old and had thought about retiring for a number of years.

In the later years, Marx had less hands-on involvement in the manufacturing process. Marx ruled his toy empire from the 200 5th Avenue, New York office, with open 24-hour telephone communication. His last plant visit had been in 1950.

Louis Marx died at the hospital in White Plains, New York, at age 85. He is interred in a private mausoleum in Woodlawn Cemetery in The Bronx, New York City.

== Personal life ==
Marx married his first wife Irene Saltzman, nicknamed René, on December 31, 1927 in Manhattan, New York. They had four children. Rene died in April 1944 of breast cancer at age 37. Marx became very depressed at this time and suggested he might quit the business to take care of his four children.

On March 30, 1947, Marx married Idella Ruth Blackadder, Louis' chief jewelry designer for his Charmore line and nearly 28 years his junior. They had five children.

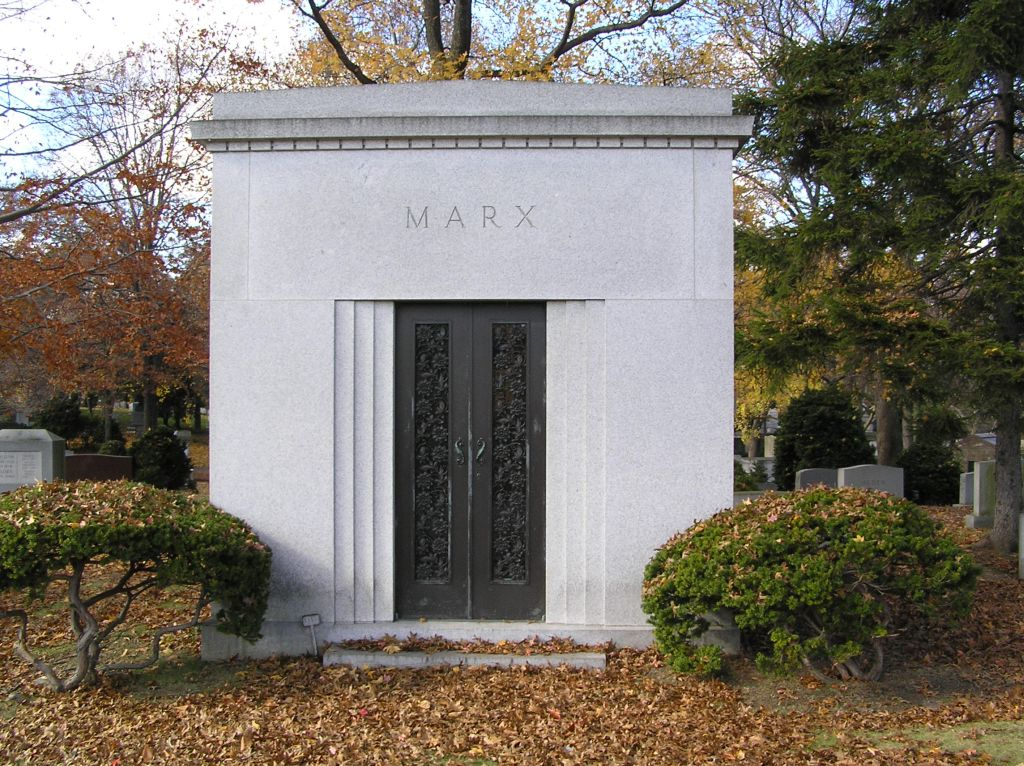
The mausoleum of Louis Marx in Woodlawn Cemetery

Marx's daughter, Patricia, was born in 1938. She went on to become an activist author, and the second wife of Daniel Ellsberg, assisting him in the release of the Pentagon Papers in 1971. Louis Marx, a strident anti-Communist and supporter of Richard Nixon, regarded Ellsberg as a traitor afterwards.

His eldest child, Barbara Marx Hubbard (1929–2019), was a New Age futurist Barbara's daughter, Alexandra Morton, is a notable marine biologist.

Marx's son, Louis Marx Junior, is a venture capitalist and philanthropist who has contributed to the arts, education and medicine. One such example is the Louis Marx, Jr. Center for Children and Families of New York.

Jacqueline Marx Barnett was an artist, maker of paintings and prints.

With his last wife he had 5 sons. They were named after prominent WWII American and international military figures, with whom Marx had close association during that time period.
