= Girard Model Works =

American toy manufacturer

The Girard Model Works, was an early American toy manufacturing company. It was established by Frank E. Wood in 1919 in Pennsylvania. Metal or tinplate toy trucks, cars and airplanes were their specialty. However, they made various other mechanical and lithographed toys as well.

The Girard Model Works operated from the early 1920s to 1934, making various metal toys, vehicles and trains. "Joy Line" was the name given to their 4-inch line of lithographed trains.

In 1928, Louis Marx, the founder of Louis Marx and Company, worked for the company and marketed their toys for them. Owning a toy company himself, he commissioned the Girard Model Works to manufacture toys for his own use as well. This was well before he would have his own factories. During this time he developed a financial interest in the company. As early as 1933, the Sears Wishbook shows the Joy Lines trains under the Marx moniker.

In 1934 Woods declared bankruptcy and Marx took ownership of the company at the court proceedings. Many of the toys from both companies are quite alike with only the name being the difference. Louis Marx also continued making toys in this expanded Girard factory until 1972.

== Bibliography ==
- Matzke, Eric (1989). Greenberg's Guide to Marx Trains. Vol. I. Greenberg Publishing. ISBN 0-89778-131-7.
- Whitacre, Robert (1991). Greenberg's Guide to Marx Trains. Vol. III. Greenberg Publishing. ISBN 0-89778-159-7.
- O'Brien, Richard (1999). O'Brien's: Collecting Toy Trains. Iola, WI: Krause Publications. ISBN 0-87341-769-0.
