= Best of the West (action figures) =

Toy line

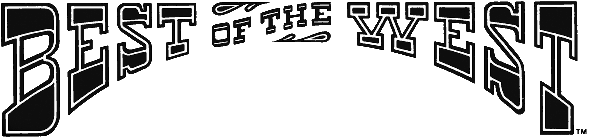
- Type: Action figures
- Invented by: Louis Marx
- Company: Louis Marx
- Country: United States
- Availability: 1965–75
- Materials: Plastic
- Features: American frontier

The Best of the West was the generic series name used by toy manufacturer, Louis Marx and Company, from the mid-1960s to the early 1970s to market a line of articulated 12-inch action figures featuring a western play theme. The focal character in the series was the iconic cowboy action figure named Johnny West.

== History ==
=== Background ===
In 1964, toy manufacturer, Louis Marx and Company, sought the means to compete against Hasbro's newly introduced G.I. Joe action figure line. Marx was able to employ their state-of-the-art plastic injection technology to produce a 12" articulated action figure. Originally, this military figure, packaged under the name Stony Smith, did not have articulated knee joints. In 1965, bendable legs were added. The Stony Smith action figure came with molded-on plastic clothing and a full arsenal of equipment accessories. In 1966, realizing that their figure was not doing well against Hasbro's aggressive marketing campaigns, Marx produced a fully articulated figure with removable clothing. Originally marketed under the Stony Smith brand name, Marx later repackaged this figure under the names All American Fighter and Buddy Charlie (including a Canadian model). With the popularity of the mid 60's spy craze Marx also released a "Mike Hazard Double Agent" action figure. Despite Marx's efforts, none of the military figures did well in the action figure marketplace.

During this time, Marx realized they would need to take a different approach if they were going to become truly competitive in the action figure marketplace. In 1965, Marx focused on producing a 12" cowboy action figure named Johnny West. Also in 1965, along with Johnny, an Indian named Chief Cherokee and a horse named Thunderbolt with full tack were introduced.

In 1966, Marx introduced cowgirl Jane West, her range horse, Flame, and a junior version of Thunderbolt, named Thundercolt. Additional new series items offered that year included a wild mustang, a teepee, a corral and a jeep and trailer set.

=== "Best of the West" series ===
Commencing in 1967, Marx made a bold move to greatly expand its western action figure line-up. At the same time, the Best of the West began to appear for the first time in television ads as the official name of the toy line-up.

Other figures added to the line-up in 1967 included more horses, other animals, and the West children. The family members included two girls, Josie and Janice, as well as two boys, Jay and Jamie. They had a chestnut or palomino "Pancho" pony, a wild buffalo, and two dogs Flick, a German Shepherd and Flack, an English Setter.

The West family collection also included other accessories, such as a buckboard, covered or surrey wagon with horses that were fully rigged as well as a homestead for the West family. The homestead, made of cardboard, was known as "Circle X Ranch", named for the trademark logo of Marx Toys. Horses in the collection included palomino, black, bay, and chestnut color variations of Thunderbolt. Other horses included Buckskin and Comanche. Buckskin (despite its name) was available in brown or palomino, each with fixed legs and a neck and head complete with full articulation.

=== Fort Apache Fighters ===
The years 1967-68 introduced many other new figures to the "Best of the West" collection as well. The Fort Apache Fighters Series was developed as an offshoot of the collection. New action figures in 1967 included Captain Maddox, Zeb Zachary, Bill Buck and two additional Indians, named Geronimo and Fighting Eagle. In 1968, a General Custer figure was added. Two color variations (palomino and brown) of the fully articulated Comanche horse and a full-scale cardboard Fort Apache were added to the series during those years, too.

=== "Best of the West" in the 1970s ===
During the 1970s, additional action figures were added to the series, the first being western badman and gambler Sam Cobra. Following the release of Sam Cobra, Marx later added a town sheriff figure named Sheriff Garrett, after the famous historical lawman Pat Garrett of "Billy the Kid" fame. Around this same time, additional action figures were also released in Canada to expand the collection yet further. These included lawman Sheriff Thomas Goode, outlaw Dangerous Dan, and cowpoke Jimmy West. A pinto version of Thunderbolt, marketed under the name, Storm Cloud, was made available as the official Indian horse, a role that Thunderbolt had assumed in the early production years. And finally, Marx produced a Native American woman, called Princess Wildflower.

=== Johnny West Adventure Series ===
In 1975, after 10 years of continuous Johnny West production, Marx devised a new and final series name for their western/cavalry themed action figures, the Johnny West Adventure Series. The Johnny West Adventure series included new box designs, along with figures and accessories in much brighter color schemes. Marx released "Quick Draw" versions of Johnny West and Sam Cobra in which a lever in the back would allow figures to draw their pistols. In addition, Marx introduced Jed Gibson, a black cavalry scout, that was only produced in the Johnny West Adventure Series.

== Series figures ==
Character Name	Role	Release year
Johnny West	Male Cowboy	1965
Sam Cobra	Male Villain	1972
Chief Cherokee	Male Indian Chief	1965
Thunderbolt	Johnny's Horse	1965
Storm Cloud	Chief Cherokee's Horse	1972
Jane West	Johnny's Wife	1966
Jamie West	Johnny's Son	1967
Jay West	Johnny's Son	1967
Janice West	Johnny's Daughter	1967
Josie West	Johnny's Daughter	1967
Flame	Jane's Horse	1965
Pancho	West Children's Pony	1967
Buckskin	Articulated Head Horse	1967
Buffalo	American bison	1967
Flick	German Shepherd	1967
Flack	English Setter	1967
Circle X Ranch	Western Homestead	1967
Indian Tepee	Tepee	1966
Camping Set	Jeep w/Tent	1968
Geronimo	Male Indian	1967
Fighting Eagle	Male Indian	1967
Sheriff Garrett	Male Sheriff	1973
General Custer	Male Cavalry General	1968
Captain Maddox	Male Cavalry Captain	1967
Zeb Zachary	Young Cavalry Soldier	1967
Bill Buck	Male Fort Apache Fighter	1967
Thundercolt	Young Horse	1966
Fort Apache	Cavalry Fort	1967
Comanche	Fully Articulated Horse	1967
Princess Wild Flower	Female Indian	1974
Buckboard and Thunderbolt	Wagon w/Wheeled Horse	1967
Covered Wagon and Horse	Wagon w/Wheeled Horse	1967
Jed Gibson	Male Cavalry Scout	1975
Johnny West with Quick Draw Action	Male Cowboy	1975
Sam Cobra with Quick Draw Action	Male Villain	1975
