= Nutty Mads =

1960s toy line

Nutty Mads are monochromatic, injection-molded polymer plastic toy figures originally manufactured in 1963–1964 by the Marx Toy Company. Comically grotesque and minutely detailed, the series was a contemporary of the stylized Kustom Kulture graphics of Ed "Big Daddy" Roth (whose bizarre Rat Fink character was being licensed by Revell for hot rod model kits at the time), as well as of the comic art of popular magazine cartoonists Basil Wolverton and Don Martin.

Generally about 6 in (150 mm) tall, each figure stands on a flat base in a fixed pose, complete with bulging, bloodshot eyes and maniacal expression. They originally sold in five and dime stores like Woolworth's, Newberry's and G. C. Murphy. Each figure was available in a variety of colors. Their popularity led Marx to expand the product line with several similar series, including Weird-Ohs, Blame-Its and Cartoon Soldiers (commonly referred to as "Nutty Generals"). Marx manufactured other toys based on the Nutty Mad brand as well, including battery-operated tin toys made in Japan, wind-up toys, water pistols, a bagatelle-style pinball game, and even an enclosed, tabletop target-shooting game.

Recastings from the original Marx molds began to appear from PlastiMarx out of Mexico several years after Marx was sold to Quaker Oats in 1972. These were also produced in various colors, and do not bear the Marx copyright on the bottom.

Series 1:

- Roddy the Hot Rod (driver)
- Manny the Reckless Mariner
- Waldo the Weightlifter
- Rocco the Champ (boxer)
- Dippy the Deep Diver (scuba diver)
- Donald the Demon (driver)

Series 2:

- All-Heart Hogan (policeman)
- Bull Pen Boo Boo (baseball pitcher)
- Chief Lost Teepee (Native American)
- End Zone (football player)
- Suburban Sidney (tricyclist)
- The Thinker (Rodin sculpture parody)

Series 3:

- Smokey Sam (firefighter)
- U.S. Male (mail carrier)
- Gutterball Annie (bowler)
- Hippo Crit (physician)
- Mudder (homemaker)
- Now! Children (school teacher)

Weird-Ohs: (A similar Marx-produced series of plastic figures, based on the Hawk Model kits created by illustrator and cartoonist Bill Campbell.)

- Drag Hag (racer)
- Daddy the Swingin' Suburbanite (racer)
- Endsville Eddie (racer)
- Freddy Flameout (test pilot)
- Davey the Psycho Cyclist (outlaw biker)
- Digger (racer)
