= Barbara Marx Hubbard =

American futurist, author and public speaker

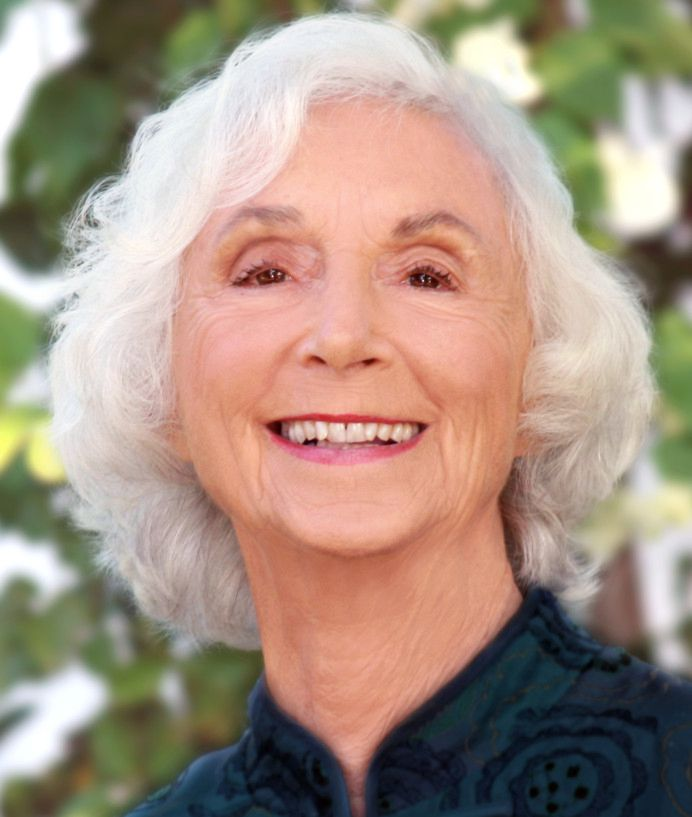
- Hubbard in 2011
- Born: December 22, 1929; United States
- Died: April 10, 2019 (aged 89); Colorado, U.S.
- Occupations: Futurist, author, public speaker
- Children: Alexandra Morton

Barbara Marx Hubbard (born Barbara Marx; December 22, 1929 – April 10, 2019), was an American futurist, author, and public speaker. She is credited with The Wheel of Co-Creation 2.0 and concepts of "The Synergy Engine" and the "birthing" of humanity.

== Early life and education ==
A Jewish agnostic, Barbara Marx was the first of four children of Irene (née Saltzman) and Louis Marx, a toy maker. In her youth she attended the Dalton School in New York City. She studied at L'Ecole des Sciences Politiques at La Sorbonne in Paris during her junior year of college, and received a B.A. cum laude in Political Science from Bryn Mawr College in 1951. In 1951, as well, she married artist Earl Hubbard, whom she'd met in Paris in 1949. They settled in Connecticut and started a family.

== Career ==
As an author, speaker, and co-founder and president of the Foundation for Conscious Evolution, Hubbard posited that humanity was on the threshold of a quantum leap if newly emergent scientific, social, and spiritual capacities were integrated to address global crises.

She was the author of seven books on social and planetary evolution. In conjunction with the Shift Network, she co-produced the worldwide "Birth 2012" multimedia event.

She was the subject of a biography by author Neale Donald Walsch, The Mother of Invention: The Legacy of Barbara Marx Hubbard and the Future of "YOU". Deepak Chopra called her "the voice for conscious evolution".

Hubbard was an American modern-day female futurist. Throughout her life, she had questioned what would make life easier as well as make people happy. For Hubbard, she did not like the molds that were expected out of herself as well as others, and in the 1970s she started speaking at futurist conferences about her findings. Those aided in her interest to the movement and resulted in her attending, speaking at, and creating conferences. With that, she dedicated her life to sharing the potential today's modern world has in achieving a better society and came up with the idea of "birthing" humanity. In 1998, she had written and published a successful book titled “Conscious Evolution: Awakening the Power of Our Social Potential". which was about her futurist ideas in making a better society as well as focusing on what the conscious mind can do if it is aware of its power. Hubbard went as far as creating her own organization called the Committee for the Future and later created others such as Women of Vision in Action, The Alliance for the Advancement of Conscious Evolution as well as 7 others. Hubbard helped set modern futurism into momentum and took measures to make sure the ideas continued beyond her. She also co-chaired a number of Soviet-American Citizen Summits, introducing a new concept called "SYNCON" to foster synergistic convergence with opposing groups. In addition, she co-founded the World Future Society, and the Association for Global New Thought.

== Personal life and death ==
Hubbard's daughter Alexandra Morton is a marine biologist and her sister Patricia Ellsberg was married to the Pentagon Papers whistleblower Daniel Ellsberg.

Hubbard fell ill with knee swelling on April 3, 2019, and was taken to the Medical Center of the Rockies in Loveland, Colorado, to receive treatment. She was later sent to the hospital emergency room. On April 6, a doctor reported that she had not woken from treatment easily and her condition continued to worsen. On April 8, Hubbard expressed that she was preparing to leave and died on April 10.

== Bibliography ==
- The Evolutionary Journey: A Personal Guide to a Positive Future (1992 edition with Barry Weins and Wabun Wind). Evolutionary Press, 1982. ISBN 0-943408-01-6
- The Hunger of Eve: One Woman's Odyssey Toward the Future. Island Pacific Northwest, 1989. ISBN 0-942133-00-5
- The Revelation: Our Crisis is a Birth (The Book of Co-Creation). Foundation for Conscious Evolution, 1993. ISBN 0-9631032-0-2
- The Revelation: A Message of Hope for the New Millennium. Nataraj Publishing, 1995 (2nd ed.) ISBN 1-882591-21-6
  - Excerpts reprinted by permission of Hay House in the Monthly Aspectarian, available online: Part I, August 1996 and Part II, September 1996
- Conscious Evolution: Awakening the Power of Our Social Potential. New World Library, 1998. ISBN 1-57731-016-0
- Emergence: The Shift from Ego to Essence. Hampton Roads Publishing Company, 2001. ISBN 1-57174-204-2
- Birth 2012 & Beyond: Humanity's Great Shift to the Age of Conscious Evolution. Shift Books, 2012. ISBN 978-0984840700
- Conscious Evolution: Awakening the Power of Our Social Potential. Revised Edition. New World Library, 2015. ISBN 978-1-60868-117-4
- The Suprasexual rEvolution: Toward the Birth of a Universal Humanity. With Marian Head. Marlin Press, 2012 ISBN 978-0-9839209-3-9
- 52 Codes For Conscious Self Evolution: A Process of Metamorphosis to Realize Our Full Potential Self. With Carolyn Anderson. Foundation for Conscious Evolution, 2011 ISBN 978-0-9796259-0-9

== Multimedia ==
- Humanity Ascending; OUR STORY DVD (2007)
- Visions of a Universal Humanity DVD (2010)
- American Visionary: The Story Of Barbara Marx Hubbard DVD (2017)
