= Johnny West (toy) =

Cowboy action figure

- Type: Action figure
- Invented by: Louis Marx
- Company: Louis Marx
- Country: United States
- Availability: 1965–76
- Materials: Polyethylene
- Features: Cowboy

Johnny West was a 12-inch tall American cowboy action figure, and the central character in the Louis Marx company's "Best of the West" 'sixth scale' (1:6) toy line.

The line was produced from 1965 until 1976, and featured a number of characters based on American "Old West" motifs, utilizing a wide range of outfit and accessory pieces.

Marx introduced Johnny West in 1965, manufacturing the cowboy virtually unchanged for the next decade. It was released a year after the debut of their Stony Smith U.S. military action figure that was put out to compete with Hasbro's G.I. Joe, and used an identical likeness to Stony.

The basic Johnny West figure was constructed of solid body parts that were injection molded in caramel brown polyethylene plastic, with the head and hands made from a softer, more pliable 'flesh-colored' PVC material. The parts were then fastened together to create a highly poseable form with articulating arms and legs. A "quick-draw" version of the figure was marketed for a couple years at the end of the line starting in 1975. It featured a raising right arm activated by a lever on the back, and a special holster that allowed a pistol accessory to be drawn. This deluxe version was cast in blue plastic.

Foreign-manufactured variants of the Johnny West exist, including a green-bodied cowboy from Canada, and versions with the "rubbery" polyvinyl accessories appearing in red and blue.
