= Big Wheel (tricycle) =

Children's toy vehicle

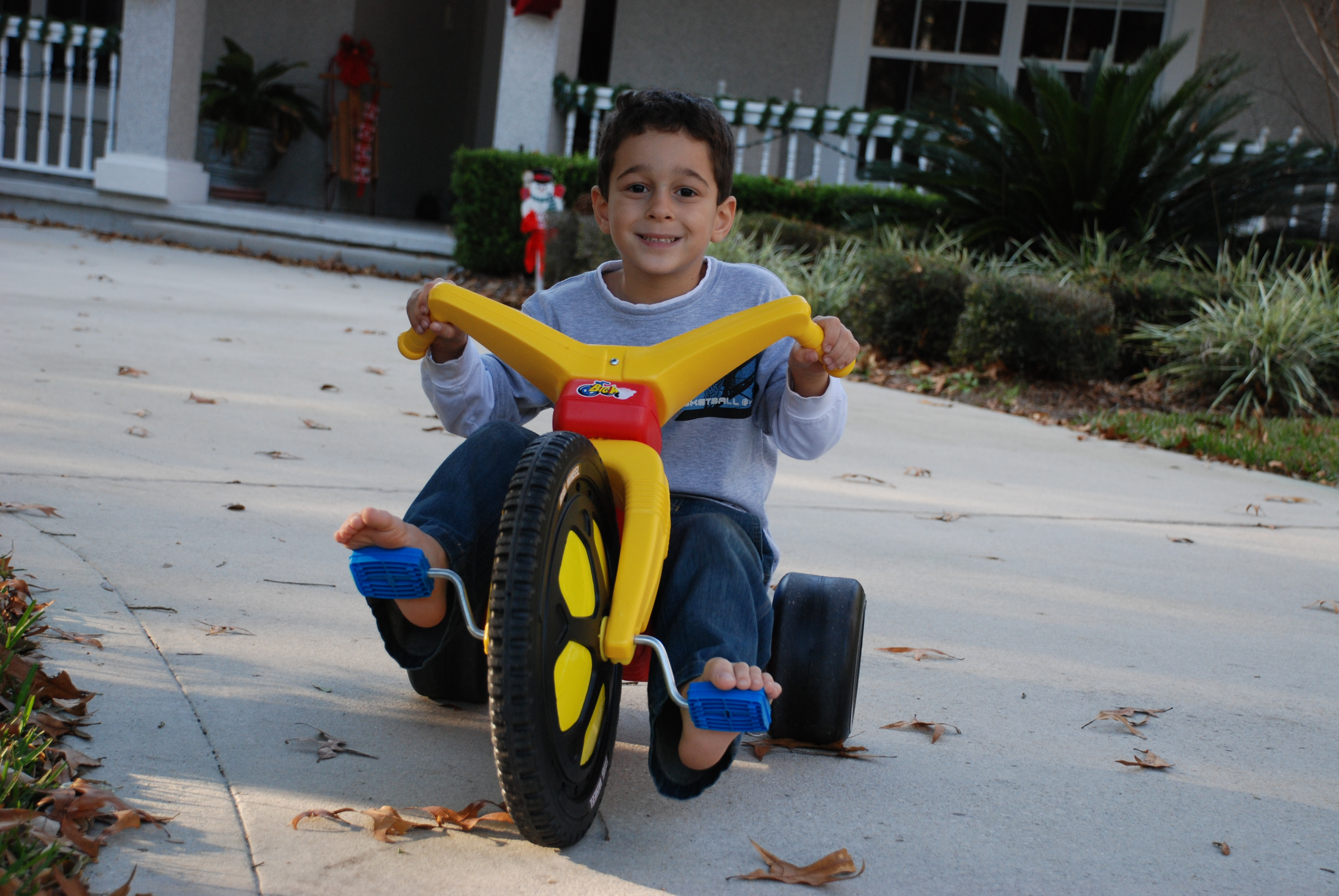
A child riding a Big Wheel tricycle

Big Wheel is a brand of low-riding tricycle, made mostly of plastic, with a large front wheel and shallow seat. Introduced by Louis Marx and Company in 1969 and manufactured in Girard, Pennsylvania, the Big Wheel was a popular toy in the 1970s in the United States, partly because of its low cost and partly because consumer groups said it was a safer alternative to the traditional tricycle or bicycle. Its low center of gravity made it a stable tricycle for children to ride, minimizing both tip-overs and the severity of any related falls.

== Design ==
The original Marx Big Wheel tricycle had rotomolded red, blue, yellow, and black plastic parts. The seat sits very low to the ground and is adjusted front and back by aligning a pair of large pegs in its base with a desired set of holes molded into the frame. The large front wheel is approximately 16–18″ in height. In the 1970s, a handbrake was added in front of the right rear wheel to facilitate intentional spin outs. Models included the Champion Cycle with a coaster brake in the front wheel, the Mini Sweetheart for toddler girls and the black Cobra Cycle, featuring cobra graphics and a "license plate" that could be personalized.

== Imitations ==
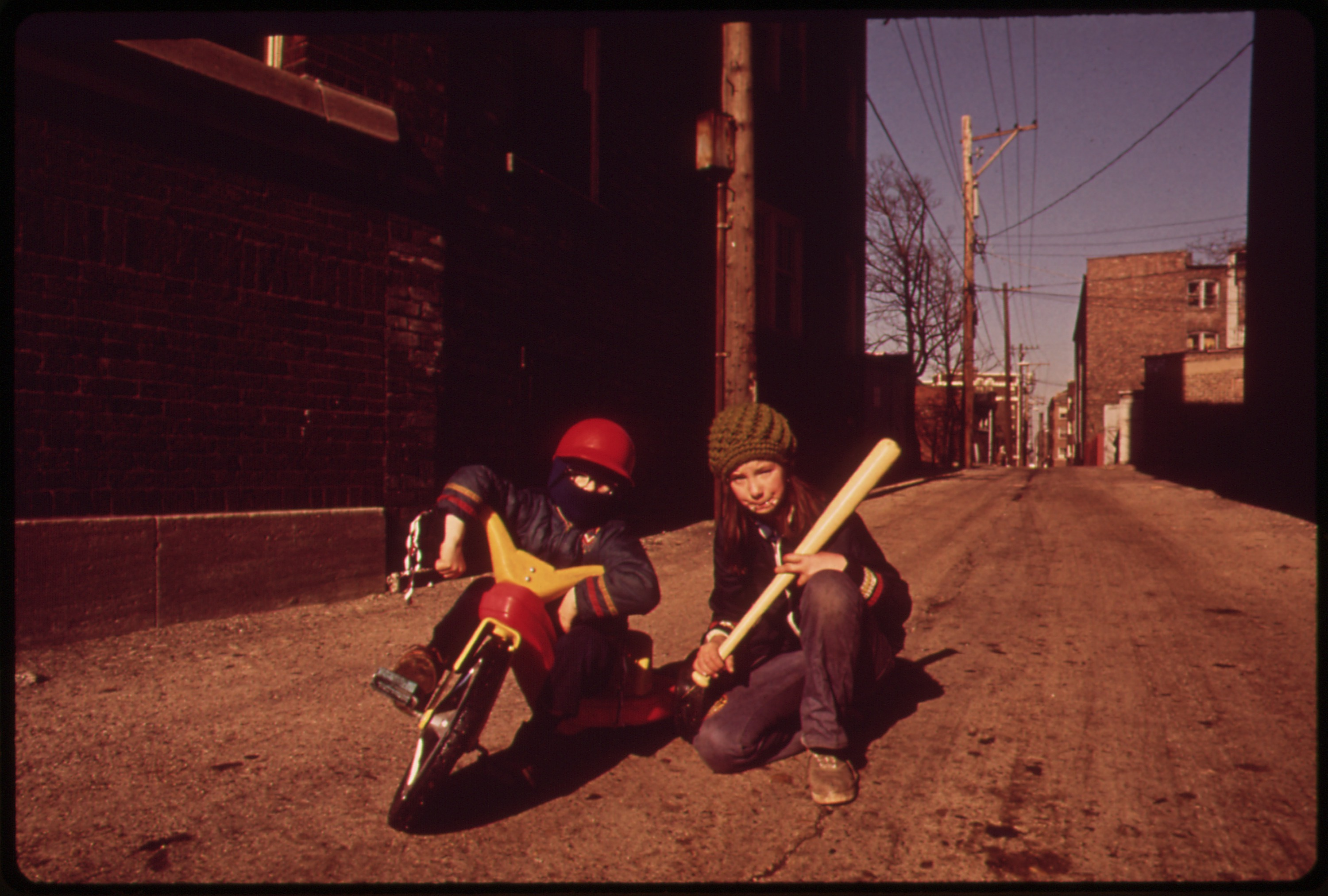
A child on a Big Wheel in 1973

The design was quickly imitated, under a variety of brand names. Although "Big Wheel" was a registered trademark, it was frequently used as a generic name for any toy whose design resembled that of Marx. Following the bankruptcy and liquidation of Marx Toys in the early 1980s, the Big Wheel brand name and molds were sold to Empire Plastics, makers of the Power Cycle brand, which was Marx's biggest competitor.

By the late 1990s, few manufacturers were making these toys. Empire filed for bankruptcy in 2001. The Big Wheel brand was reintroduced under new ownership in 2003. The Big Wheel was inducted into the National Toy Hall of Fame at the Strong in Rochester, New York, in 2009. In 2021, the Big Wheel brand was acquired by Schylling Inc., a company specializing in classic toys and games.

== Annual races ==
Annual races are held for Big Wheel-style tricycles in some locations. One, the "Bring Your Own Big Wheel" race, takes place on Easter Sunday in San Francisco. A Big Wheel race was hosted by the Tulsa Big Wheel Racers LLC as a fundraiser for the Cancer Sucks cancer research center on June 13, 2009. There is also an annual Big Wheel Relay in Cleveland, Ohio, hosted by the Cleveland Hearing & Speech Center. The event is designed to raise awareness and money for Cleveland Hearing & Speech Center's services.
