= Big Loo =

1960s toy robot

Big Loo was a toy robot manufactured by Louis Marx and Company for the 1963 Christmas holiday season. It retailed for $9.99. The toy, primarily made of injection molded hi-impact polystyrene parts, stood three-feet tall (37-inches), a foot wide, and nine inches deep.

Its key features included a sight scope with cross-hairs, two flashing battery-powered red eyes with an on-off switch, a hand-cranked mechanical voice box that played ten messages, two rubber-tipped darts that were fired from triggers on the back, a left arm that held four red balls which were fired from a spring in the left elbow, and a right arm that had a grasping claw able to pick up objects. One foot was equipped with a spring-powered rocket. It could also squirt water from its navel and was equipped with a compass, whistle, bell, a Morse code clicker with chart, and could bend over at the waist.

Big Loo was featured on the cover of the Los Lobos album Colossal Head.
