= Ferdinand Strauss Company =

American Toy Company

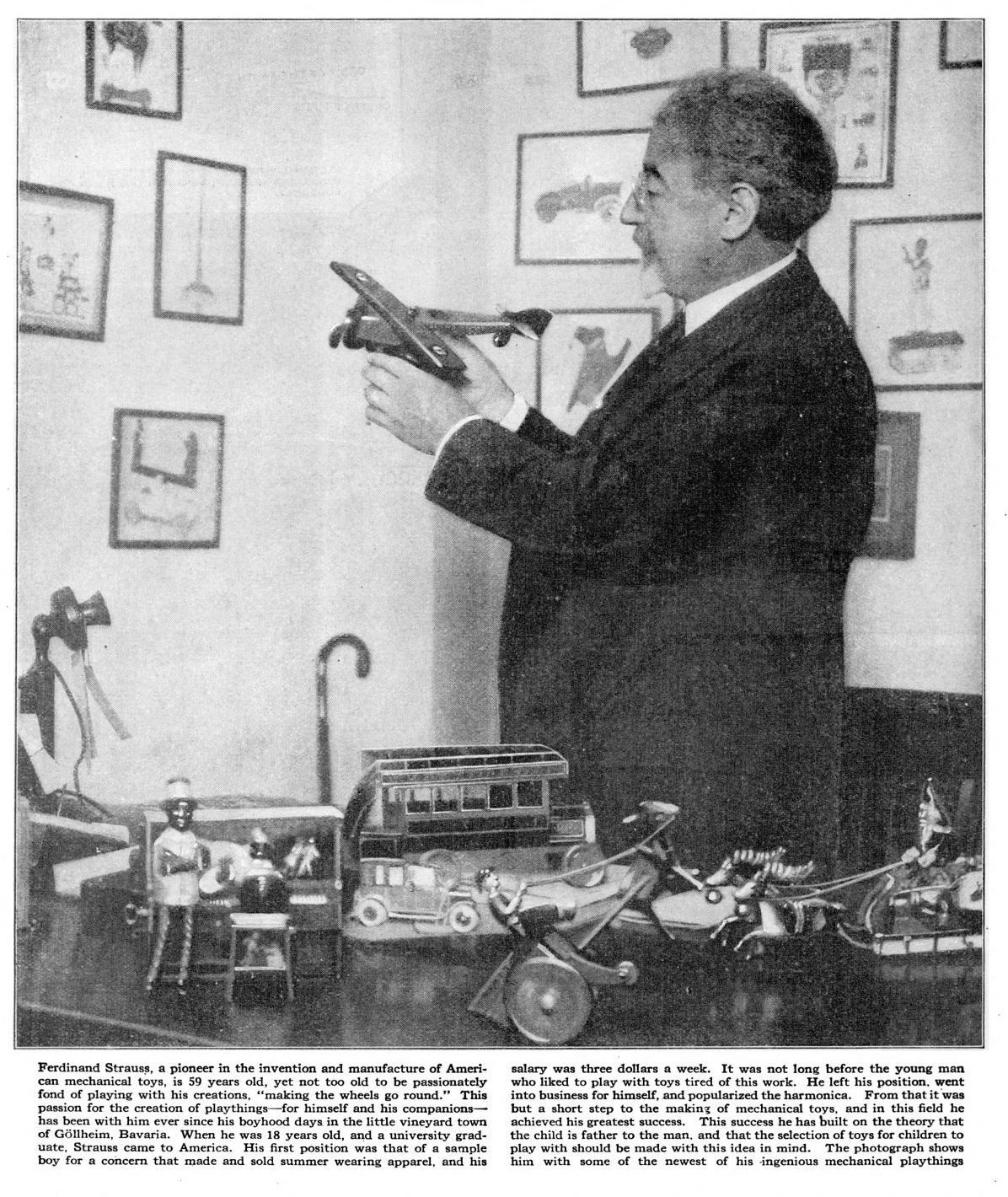
Strauss in 1924, in his office with various toys.

Ferdinand Strauss Company was an American toy company, founded in the early 1900s, based in New York, New York, that made inexpensive toys, including wind-up mechanical toys, out of lithographed tin. One of its early mechanical products was Trixo the climbing monkey. In later years, Strauss would be known as "The Founder of the Mechanical Toy Industry in America".

Strauss came to the United States from a German region of Alsace. At first, he imported the various toys that he sold from his New York shop. His first popular hit was the harmonica.

In 1912, Ferdinand Strauss hired future toy magnate Louis Marx.

By 1914, he had four toy shops in New York and a manufacturing facility in Newark. As a pioneer in the friction power tin toy industry, the company would soon produce various clockwork or wind-up toys that were distributed by the Strauss Stores and other contemporaneous merchants.

Strauss began manufacturing his own toys in 1918. He employed 50 workers at the East Rutherford, New Jersey factory. Tin lithographed operating cars, trucks, buses, boats and wagons were all part of the line. Mechanical dancers, musicians, and windup toys filled the Strauss shelves.

In 1917, Ferdinand Strauss also hired Henry Katz, future toy designer and friend of Louis Marx. Although Katz spent much time in the production process, he preferred the sales end of the toy business. He was active with the company until its demise, after which he started his own business, Henry Katz and Company.

Although Marx was managing Strauss' New Jersey plant, he was voted out by Strauss' board of directors over sales disagreements. He would go on to form the Louis Marx and Company.

Strauss also sold stand-alone tin train-related items, such as Twin trolleys, Railway Express, All-aboard Limited and an operating boxcar. It was called The TravelChiks. When wound, chickens on top of the boxcar would peck in a tin food pan.

Although Strauss was able to capture much of the mechanical tin toy craze of the early 1920s, tin toys from other manufacturers introduced during the same era did take market share away from Strauss, who had similar toys.

Strauss Company's eventual fate is unclear but the company appears to have disappeared by 1927, with solid evidence of Marx leasing the old Strauss building and picking up the line and incorporating them into his own.
