= Husky (toy brand) =

Former brand of scale model vehicles

- Product type: Die-cast scale model vehicles
- Produced by: Mettoy
- Country: U.K.
- Introduced: 1964
- Discontinued: 1970; 56 years ago (rebranded as "Corgi Juniors")
- Markets: Worldwide
- Previous owners: Mettoy

Husky was a brand name for a line of business die-cast toy scale model vehicles manufactured by defunct company Mettoy Playcraft Ltd. of Swansea, Wales, which also made the larger Corgi Toys. Husky Models was re-branded "Corgi Junior" in 1970, and a further range called "Corgi Rockets" was developed to race on track sets.

== Husky ==
The Husky line, introduced in 1964, was designed to compete in size with the "1-75 series" Matchbox, which were the market leaders in small-scale toy vehicles at the time. Husky cars and trucks were inexpensive and originally sold only at Woolworth's stores at a price which undercut their rival.

The Husky line numbered about 75 vehicles at its peak, the same number as Matchbox. Unlike the Lesney product, however, Huskys were sold in blister packs, allowing the model to be clearly seen when on display. The original style of these blister cards had a simple red and white design on the front, with the range's logo, the head of a Husky dog, featuring prominently, and a list of the models in the range printed as a tick-list on the rear. The design changed with the upgrading of the range in 1969 to a yellow, red and white colour scheme, with the name "Husky" now featuring more prominently. Like Matchbox, Husky also offered accessory items for children, such as carrying/storage cases for the cars, and catalogues in the late 1960s.

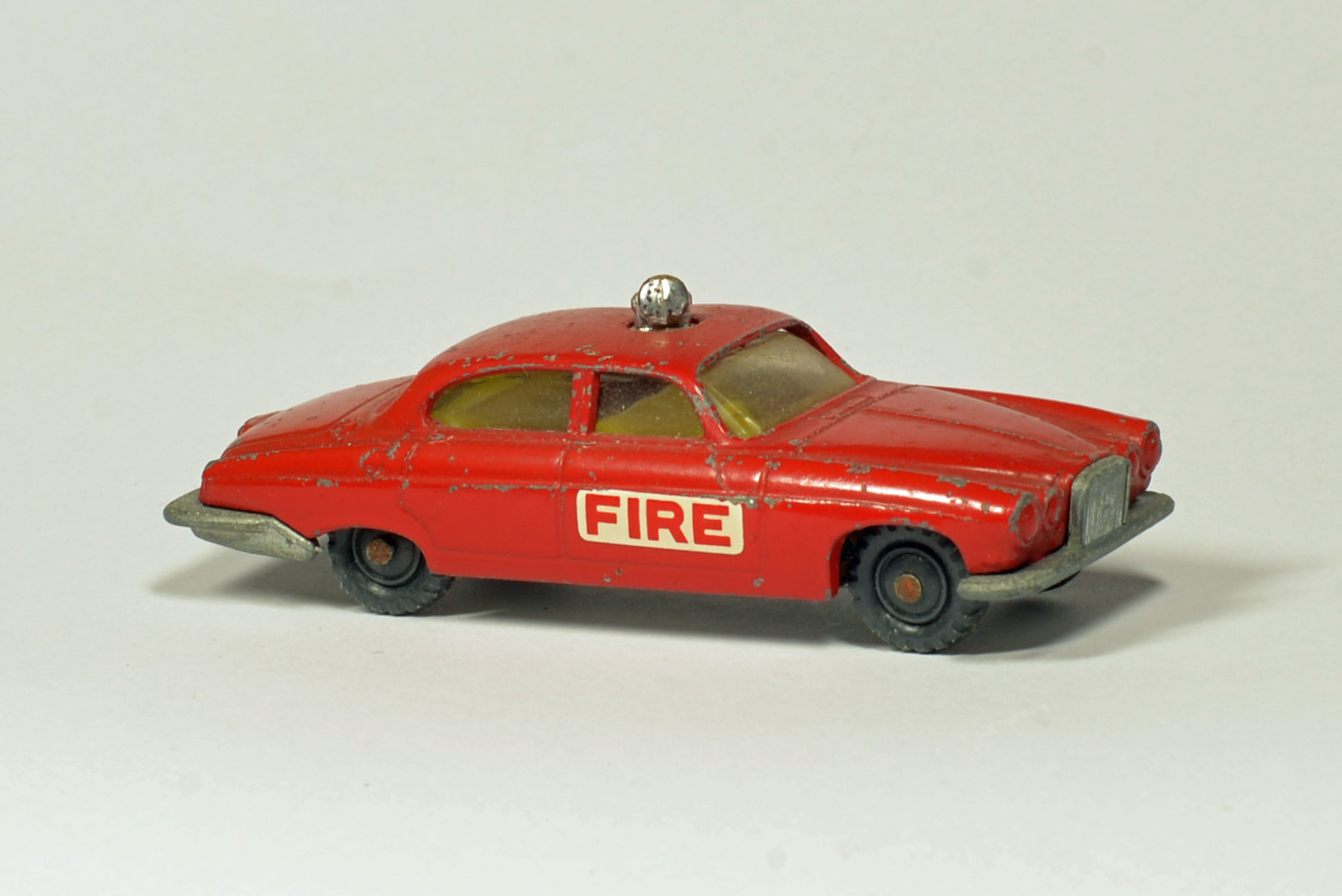
Husky Jaguar MK10

Husky's original choices of vehicles included many models not seen before or since in miniature. British, French, German and American cars were all represented; examples included a Citroën DS estate with a rowing boat on the roof, a Reliant 3 wheeler pickup, a 1959 Buick Electra, a Land Rover utility vehicle, a Reliant Scimitar, a Sunbeam Alpine, a 1966 Oldsmobile Starfire, and an NSU Ro-80.

Some models, such as the Studebaker Lark Wagonaire, were also produced by Matchbox at about the same time, though from different castings. Both versions had the sliding rear roof panel, though the Husky's was clear plastic while the Matchbox's was metal. The tailgate of the Husky was plastic and came down. The Matchbox version came with a white plastic hunter aiming his rifle with a pointer dog, while Husky used the sliding roof panel for other variations: one version was an ambulance with a plastic stretcher and another had a TV camera placed in the back section. Husky also produced its version in five different colours, whereas Matchbox produced only two shades of a single colour, a lighter and a darker turquoise.

"Husky Majors" was a line of trucks mimicking the "Matchbox Major Packs" of virtually the same name. One offering in this line was Husky 2002, a Ford car carrier (transporter) truck with a Hoynor Mk. II trailer. Chocks on the trailer could be adjusted for different sized cars, and the rear gate could be lowered and the whole upper section of the trailer dropped to deposit cars to the tarmac. A separate gift pack offered this truck with five cars. Another truck in the series was a Husky moving van with "Husky" molded and brightly lettered in red on the sides.

The first models featured dark grey one-piece plastic wheels and chromed plastic bases. These cheaper bases made the models lighter and perhaps less durable than Matchbox cars. However, their construction allowed for a simple suspension system: the axle was sandwiched between the main base and a section of the plastic base that was cut away on three sides to form a plastic tongue, which acted as a crude springing mechanism. In 1969 Mettoy re-designed and improved the quality of the models. Die cast metal bases, better suspension and two-piece wheels with separate hubs and tyres were fitted to existing models, and a variety of new models were added to the range.

== Corgi Juniors ==
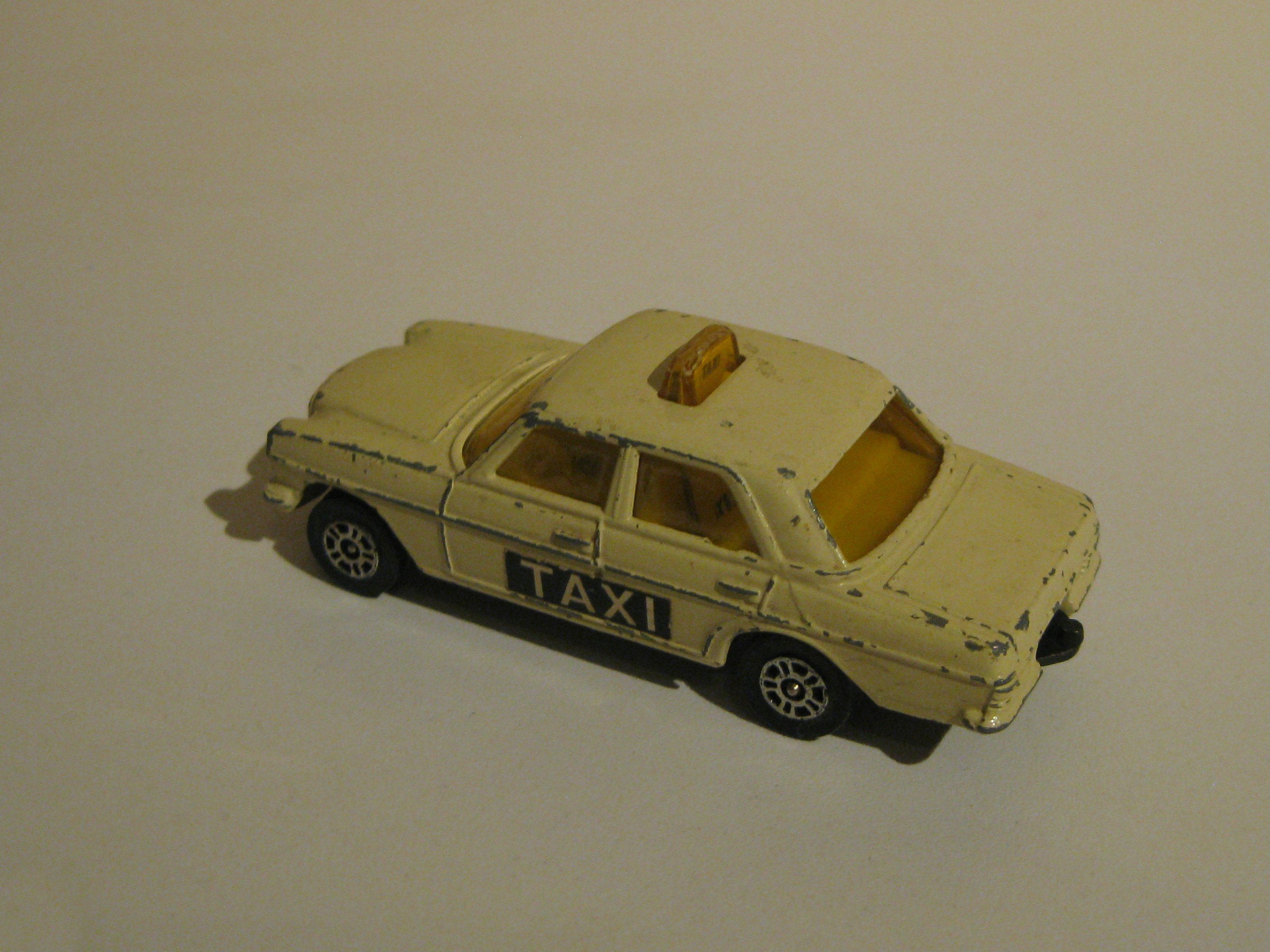
A Matchbox sized Corgi Jr. Mercedes-Benz 240 Diesel Taxi. The Husky name was rebranded "Corgi Jr." about 1970

By 1970 the exclusive marketing contract with Woolworth had come to an end. Realising that the Husky range could now be sold alongside Matchbox in a variety of outlets, Mettoy re-launched the series as Corgi Juniors to integrate it into the Corgi Toys family, and the existing Husky models now carried the new name. This was the first time the range had been branded as a Corgi product. Low- friction, all- plastic Whizzwheels were also added to most of the models in 1970 to compete with Mattel's Hot Wheels and Lesney's Matchbox Superfast ranges, and they could be raced on the Corgi Rockets track systems.

Although small- scale Corgi models continued to be produced until the demise of the original company in 1983, the name Corgi Juniors was dropped in the mid- 1970s and the models were branded simply as Corgi.

== Corgi Rockets ==
The Corgi Rocket range first appeared in October 1969. Mettoy had decided that competing against its rivals with high-performance, low- friction models alone was not enough. To add more "play value" Corgi Rockets had die-cast metal bases that featured a central channel where a separate black nylon chassis, that also held the wheel and axle assembly, would fit. Despite the fact that the axles were somewhat thicker than their rivals, particularly Mattel’s Hot Wheels which used thin wire axles, the low friction properties of the nylon chassis in which the axle and wheel unit sat allowed Corgi Rockets to be the fastest on the track. The chassis could be removed using a "Golden Tune Up Key" - a gold coloured metal tool which was supplied with each model that featured a simple key at one end to unlock the chassis from the base of the model, and a tool at the other end to remove the axles from the chassis. As such, the models could be "tuned up" and the axles lubricated using a separately available "Rocketlube" lightweight oil dispenser in the form of a felt tip pen. The "Golden Tune Up Key" supplied with each model was also labeled with the name of the individual model.

Many Corgi Rockets had bright chrome-like finishes obtained by chrome electro-plating the body of the model and then coating the body in a clear coloured layer. Mettoy called this finish "Solarbrite", and its effect was similar to Hot Wheels' "Spectraflame" finish. In mid-1970, many of the Rockets which had previously been painted in Solarbrite were changed to bright "fluorescent" colours, called "Day-Glo" paint.

Initially seven models were introduced, three of which (D901, D902, and D907) were adapted from the Husky range, while the remaining four were new Corgi Junior designs. The initial models were:

- D901 Aston Martin DB6
- D902 Jaguar XJ6
- D903 Mercedes Benz 280SL
- D904 Porsche Carrera 6
- D905 The Saint's Volvo P1800
- D906 Jensen Interceptor
- D907 Cadillac Eldorado

Most of the models in the Corgi Rockets range also featured in the Corgi Juniors range, although sometimes there were differences in the castings that went beyond the differing baseplate/axle/wheel configurations. For instance, the Corgi Rockets #906 Jensen Interceptor did not feature opening parts, whereas the Corgi Juniors version did.

The Corgi Juniors range was priced to compete with Matchbox models, while the Corgi Rockets range sold for a higher price comparable (in the UK) with Mattel's Hot Wheels. The Rockets range met with early success and was voted Boys' Toy of the Year for 1971 by British toy industry journal Toy Trader , yet the line would be gone in less than a year.

Corgi Rockets were sold in conjunction with a series of track sets which featured "autostarts", power boosters, covered mountain-style "hair-pin" bends, "space leaps", "superloops", a cable car and even a thirteen storey "Sky Park". The range expanded rapidly and around 25 models were produced, including a James Bond 007 set featuring four models from the film On Her Majesty's Secret Service - a Mercury Cougar, an updated Mercedes Benz 280SL in "S.P.E.C.T.R.E" finish and a Ford Capri and Ford Escort in ice racing colour schemes.

The loss of a court case to Mattel, over the American toy manufacturer's claim to sole production rights to the track systems associated with its Hot Wheels cars, is thought to have been the main reason for the failure of the range, since the cars had little purpose without tracks to race on. Production of the track sets was halted immediately, while stocks already in the shops were allowed to be sold. Sales of the Rockets cars suffered as a result, and the costly-to-produce range was withdrawn at the end of 1971, after about two years in production.

== Legacy ==
The small scale models were produced by Mettoy as either Husky, Corgi Jr., Corgi Rockets or later simply Corgi until the company was declared insolvent in 1983. Corgi was purchased by Mattel in 1989 before being sold again in a management buyout in 1995. During this time, models were sold in blister packs as the Corgi Auto-City line. Several of the Corgi Junior castings were later reissued as part of Mattel's Hot Wheels line, although most were on sale for only a year or two. One model, the BMW 850i, was offered in two castings by Mattel: the former Corgi Jr. casting, which had opening doors, and Mattel's own Hot Wheels version. The Porsche Carrera casting remained in the Hot Wheels line longer and was reissued in a number of different colour schemes. This casting appears in 1972 Corgi catalogues and received its Hot Wheels "Final Run" issue in 2002.

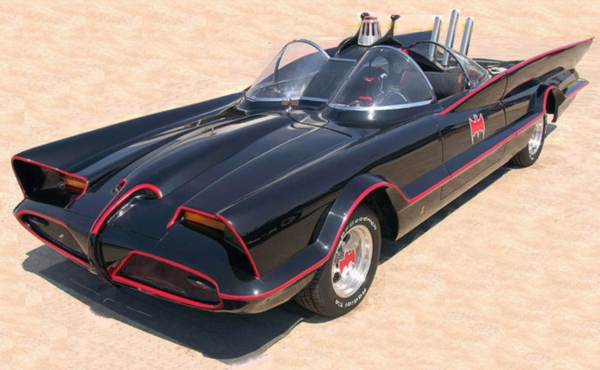
The Batmobile from the 1966 Batman series was one of the film and TV models sold under the Husky brand

Today Corgi Rockets have become the most collectible, partly because of their scarcity. However, the film and TV related models in the Husky range, such as the 1966 Batman series Batmobile, Chitty Chitty Bang Bang, The Man from U.N.C.L.E.' 'Piranha' car and the James Bond Aston Martin (though the smaller car produced was a DB6, not the DB5 seen in the larger Corgi Toys range) have realised high prices in recent years. In 2009, an original manufacturer's trade box of six Husky James Bond DB6s was sold on eBay for US$1,300. In January 2010, a Corgi Rockets James Bond "On Her Majesty's Secret Service" four-car set was sold on eBay for £3600, reportedly making it the most valuable of all Corgi branded products.

Today, the Corgi brand is owned by Hornby, and called Corgi International Limited. The company specializes in collectibles of various types including a range of 1/76 scale (00 scale) commercial vehicle models called Corgi Trackside.

In about 2005 the Husky name was used for a range of diecast emergency and commercial vehicles related to the tourism industry in the UK. An FX-2 taxi, a police car, a fire truck, and an ambulance appeared in the series. The company was based in Leicester and appears to have been unconnected to the modern Corgi company.
