= Corgi (disambiguation) =

Corgi most commonly refers to the Welsh Corgi, a type of herding dog. It may also mean:

== Manufacturing ==
- Corgi Toys, a range of die-cast toys created by the Mettoy company; or associated brands:
  - Corgi International, a company that manufactures movie prop replicas, die-cast collectibles, and gift and toy products
  - Corgi Classics, a die-cast model manufacturer
- Corgi Motorcycle Co Ltd., a British motorcycle manufacturer
- Corgi Socks, a Welsh manufacturer of luxury socks and knitwear

== Other uses ==
- Corgi (publisher), a United Kingdom imprint of the publishing company Random House
- Council for Registered Gas Installers (CORGI), a voluntary registration scheme for gas installers in the UK
- Corgi (insurance company), a company that provides commercial insurance for startup and technology companies.

== See also ==
- Korgi (disambiguation)
- The Korgis
