= Korgi =

Korgi may refer to:

- Korgi (book)
- Korgi, Kundapura, a village in Kundapura taluk, Udupi district, Karnataka, India

== See also ==
- Corgi (disambiguation)
