= Mettoy =

British toy company, 1933–1984

Mettoy Co. Ltd.
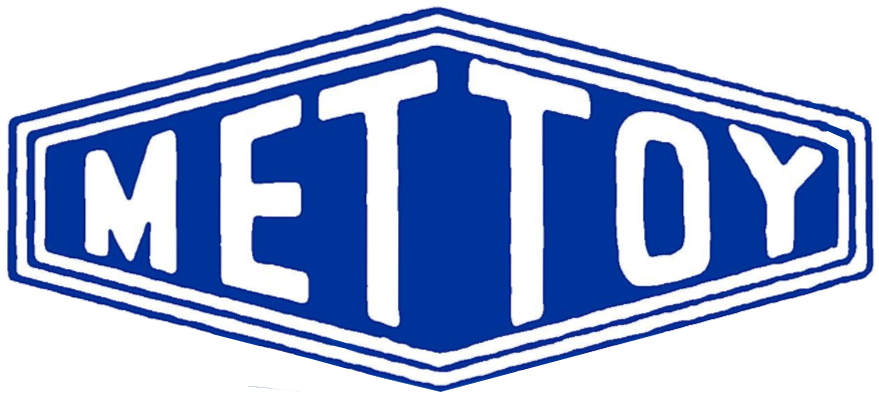
- Industry: Toy
- Founded: 1933 in Northampton
- Founder: Philipp Ullmann; Arthur Katz
- Defunct: 1984; 42 years ago
- Products: Toys, die-cast toy scale model cars
- Brands: Corgi Toys (1956–84)
- Subsidiaries: Dragon Data (1982–84)

Mettoy (an abbreviation of "Metal Toy") was a British manufacturing company founded in 1933 by German émigré Philip Ullmann, who was later joined by South African-born German Arthur Katz who had previously worked for Ullmann at his toy company Tipp and Co of Nuremberg. The firm made a variety of lithographed metal wind-up toys. Both Jewish, they moved to Britain following Hitler's rise to power in 1933.

== History ==
Ullman and Katz set up their toy-manufacturing business in Stimpson Avenue, between Abington Avenue and Wellingborough Road in Northampton, with their company registered on 31 August 1932. They initially produced very similar tinplate toys to those being made in Germany. Within six years the Northampton factory was said to have 600 employees, and from 1944 Katz was the managing director.

During the Second World War the factory manufactured not only munitions but also a cooking stove for troops posted in tropical jungle environments. The Northampton factory moved to a large site, originally used as a boot factory, in Northampton at the corner of Spencer Bridge Road and Harlestone Road, later occupied by Aldi and Iceland supermarkets.

== Speciality ==
The firm is most famous for the line of die-cast toy motor vehicles produced by its Corgi Toys branch, created in 1956. In the same year Mettoy merged with the Playcraft model railway and slot car company. The company was sold in 1984, with the assets of the company transferred to independent company Corgi Classics, but it folded shortly afterward.

== Products ==
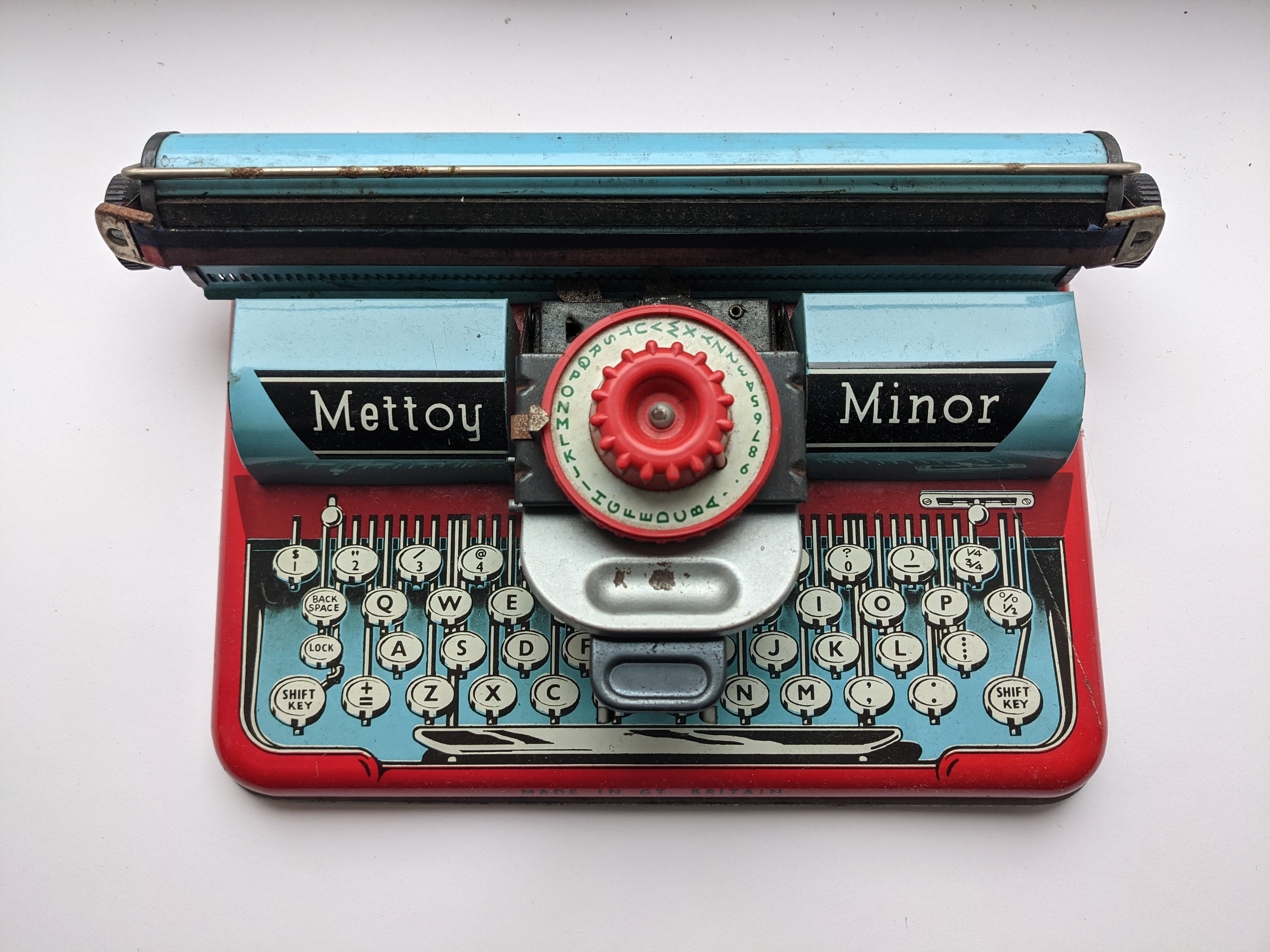
Mettoy Minor toy typewriter

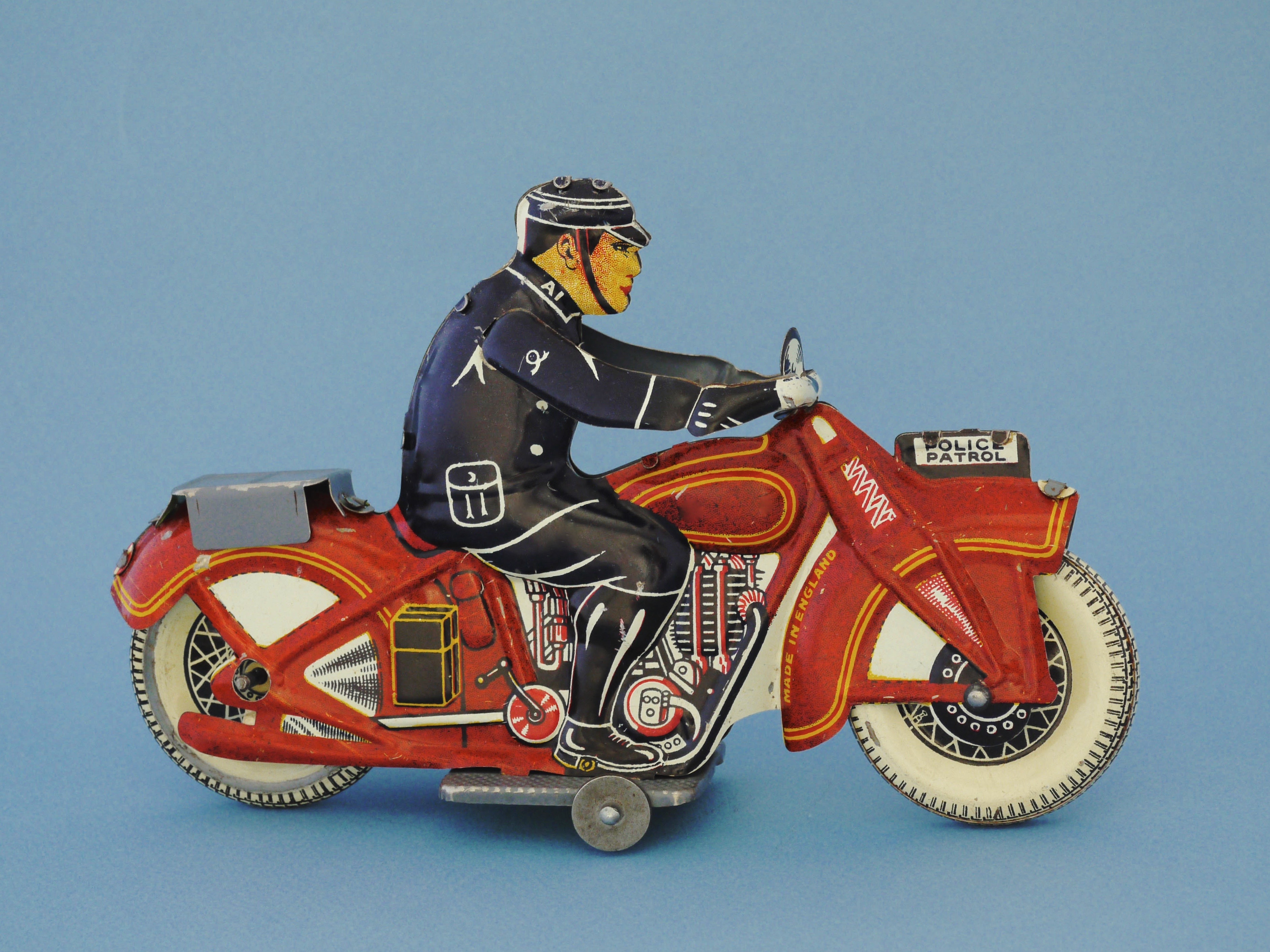
Toy police motorcycle, 1940

- Slot Cars – Playcraft Highways was the first HO Scale slot car, designed by Derek A Brand of Crafco and licensed to Playcraft. This was introduced in 1959 and was manufactured and marketed until 1962. This system set the pick up standards and track geometry that many subsequent brands followed and do so to this day.

Although not a commercial success in the UK, it was developed into Aurora Model Motoring in the United States and became a market leader.

- Toy cars – The company created a “Castoy” line of toy motor vehicles with clockwork motors in 1948.
- Dollhouses – Mettoy manufactured dollhouses from 1954 to 1965.
- Toy aircraft – In addition to toy metal aircraft Mettoy issued a Vapour Trails line of model aircraft
- Toy boats
- Toy trains – The company made a variety of low cost mainly tin toy trains powered by clockwork motors to compete with Hornby. Between 1961 and around 1971 a range of low-cost, mainly plastic, HO scale trains were sold as Playcraft Railways. The range was 99% imported from the French manufacturer Jouef, but was accompanied by buildings kits – initially from Aurora and later from Pola in West Germany.
- Toy weapons – Mettoy designed many toy metal weapons ranging from toy machine guns to ray guns.
- Tie-ins – Mettoy made a series of Dan Dare space toys and a hospital playset based on the Emergency Ward 10 television show.
- Space hoppers

Mettoy distributed Petite Typewriters and Bandbox radios as well as Aurora Plastics Corporation plastic model kits in the United Kingdom and Commonwealth.

== Computers ==
In the early 1980s the director of Mettoy noticed that many children were becoming more interested in home computers than traditional toys. Mettoy started the Dragon Data branch of its firm to manufacture computers for children.
