= Corgi International =

Manufacturing company

Corgi International Limited
- Formerly: Zindart International Limited (1978–2006)
- Type: Public
- Traded as: Nasdaq: CRGI
- Industry: Collectibles
- Founded: 1978; 48 years ago
- Defunct: 2008
- Headquarters: Hong Kong, China
- Key people: Michael Cookson; Darren Epstein
- Products: Movie prop replicas; Action figures; Figurines; Scale model ships; Trading cards; Books
- Brands: Corgi (1999–2008); Master Replicas; PopCo; Cards Inc.
- Number of employees: 159
- Subsidiaries: Corgi Classics Ltd. (1999–2008)

Corgi International Limited (formerly known as Zindart International Limited) was a manufacturing company established in 1978 which in 1999 became owner of the Corgi brand after acquiring the independent company Corgi Classics Ltd.

Corgi International consisted of three distinct brands (Master Replicas, PopCo and H2go) that manufactured movie prop replicas, die-cast scale model collectibles, and gift and toy products. The company also distributed trading cards and movie memorabilia through a separate brand.

The Company held varying licenses for entertainment franchises including Disney, Harry Potter, James Bond, Star Trek, Nintendo, Halo and The Beatles, amongst others.

== History ==
In July 1978, "Zindart International Limited" was incorporated in Hong Kong as a limited company under the Hong Kong Companies Ordinance initially to operate a manufacturing facility. In February 1997, the company’s ADSs were listed on the NASDAQ Global Market.

In July 1999, the company acquired Corgi Classics Limited, who made the classic diecast cars. Corgi was founded in 1956 in England as Mettoy. It is one of the oldest marketers of collectible die-cast models of lorries, buses, cars and aeroplanes in the world, with its principal markets of its products in the United Kingdom and Northern Europe.

After renaming the company to "Corgi International Limited", in December 2006 the company sold their Zindart Manufacturing division. Corgi also operated a book and paper division, Hua Yang, which Corgi acquired in February 1998 and had sold in May 2004. In December 2006, Corgi acquired Cards Inc. and merged with Master Replicas.

In April 2008, Corgi International sold the Corgi Toys brand, tooling and intellectual property rights to Hornby Hobbies Ltd. This sale did not include licensed properties such as James Bond and Star Trek.

== Master Replicas ==
The "Master Replicas" brand (also known as MR) produces movie prop replicas and high end collectibles. Based in Walnut Creek, CA, the company was founded in 2003 by Michael Cookson. Cookson has served as Chairman of Master Replicas since it was founded and chief executive officer since August 2004. Master Replicas develops and markets licensed collectables distributed via direct, specialty, hobby, collector and mass retail channels worldwide.

Master Replicas holds varying licenses for entertainment franchises including Star Trek, Disney, James Bond 007, Halo, Nintendo, Doctor Who, and The Muppets. Previous to January 2008, the company manufactured and sold product under the Star Wars brand before the company chose not to renew the license upon expiration. While many of their items are props at full-scale (particularly weapons like lightsabers, phasers, and swords), they also make many scale model items, like spaceships, and characters.

Master Replicas has also been commissioned to make items for corporations to resell on their own. For example, MR made a 1/6 scale Master Sword and Hylian Shield for Nintendo and Target Stores to coincide with the release of The Legend of Zelda: Twilight Princess.

=== Force FX ===
Master Replicas is known for their Force FX product line which recreated various lightsabers used in the Star Wars movies. They were in production from 2002 to 2007.

Master Replicas no longer produces this product line but has adapted the technology to replicas of other items including the Halo Energy Sword and Link's Sword from Nintendo's The Legend of Zelda.

=== Closing ===
Master Replicas closed upon Corgi International expiry. The Master Replicas brand is now owned by business development Darren Epstein who bought it from the administrators.

=== Relaunch ===
On December 29, 2022, Darren Epstein announced via Linkedin that he was relaunching the Master Replicas brand, had acquired licenses belonging to Eaglemoss, and will be "starting to put some ranges up for sale".

Legal proceedings were issued against former employees trying to pass off use of the brand in 2019, and that ceased as they had no rights for the brand, domain or usage.

In Jan 2023 it was announced that Master Replicas was to return. The announcement and email stated that Master Replicas has purchased Eaglemoss and its stock and will be marketing this product and new product ranges in due course. It was confirmed that Darren Epstein still owns the brand and was involved in the relaunch.

Master Replicas relaunched in March 2023 with its sister company Heathside Trading owned by Robert Myers and John Nelson. Heathside is a UK owned entity with over 40 staff based in Preston and London, England. It holds many licenses for many different Pop Culture ranges.

Each week Master Replicas has been releasing product that was purchased on the Eaglemoss liquidation. There were three parts of the liquidation, UK, EU and USA. It seems Heathside Trading purchased each company liquidation under the bankruptcy and has been working with Master Replicas in sale of this inventory.

Master Replicas has announced new licensing agreements with CBS, Expanse, Stargate amongst other for the continued launch of the company.

== Cards Inc. ==
Cards Inc., based in Watford, England, was founded by Darren Epstein in 1989 and was a distributor of trading cards and pop culture memorabilia principally in the United Kingdom and Europe. Darren Epstein was the winner of the Earnst and Young Young Entrepreneur of the Year as well as the Coutts regional business of the year.

The Cards Inc brand name and its trading card game, sticker, and collectible trading card-based business was sold in April 2008 the remainder of the Cards Inc business continued its distribution of pop culture collectibles under the name of "PopCo Distribution".

Cards Inc held the record for the fastest selling TSV on QVC of 12,000 units in 11 minutes on a Lord of the Rings litho print set. This was presented on screen by Darren Epstein. He also ran the Harry Potter, Star Wars and Pokemon hours for QVC for over 5 years.

On October 31, 2008, PopCo Distribution was placed into administration, which is the rough equivalent to Chapter 11 reorganization in the United States.
