= Corgi Classics =

British die-cast scale model manufacturer

Corgi Classics Limited

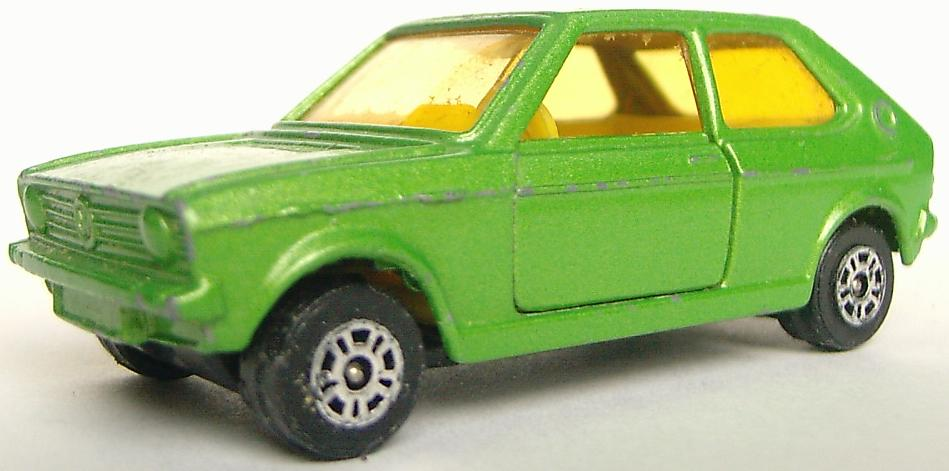
- Type: Subsidiary
- Industry: Scale model
- Founded: 1995
- Defunct: 2008
- Fate: Acquired by Zindart International in 1999 then became a brand
- Headquarters: Leicester, England
- Products: Die-cast scale model cars, airplanes, buses, military
- Brands: Corgi Toys
- Parent: Hornby
- Website: www.corgi.co.uk

Corgi Classics Limited was a British die-cast scale model manufacturer established as an independent company in 1995, which has its origins in the Corgi Toys brand introduced by Mettoy in 1956. It is known for its British and North American vehicle models.

Products manufactured and marketed by Corgi included die-cast scale model cars, airplanes, buses, and military.

In 2008 the company was acquired by Hornby Railways, who has owned the Corgi brand since then.

== History ==
=== Background: Corgi Toys era ===
Corgi Toys was launched in 1956 as a new range of die-cast toy model cars by Mettoy, the toy car company founded in 1936. These new toy cars were soon a huge hit because at the time they were the only toy cars on the market that included transparent plastic windows, they soon became known as "the ones with the windows".

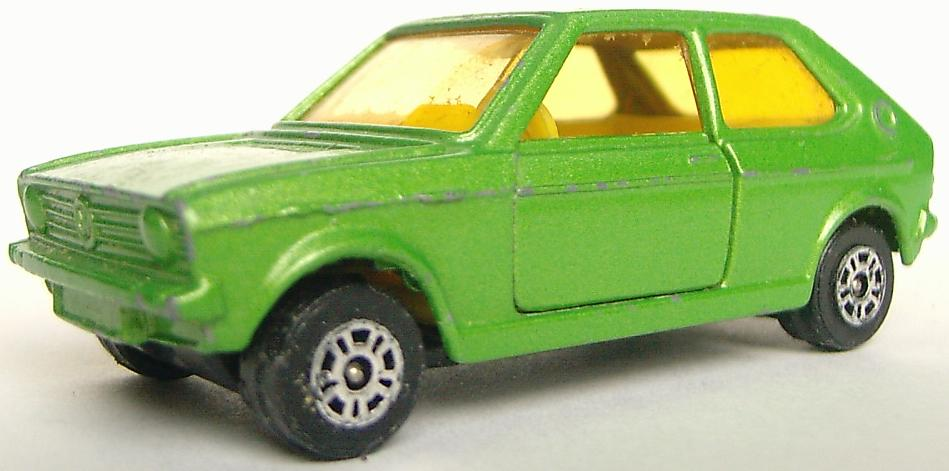
Corgi Volkswagen Polo

Although Corgi has had many model car competitors ranging from Dinky Toys to Lledo, its name is well known to this day. In its first year of trading Corgi sold 2.75 million cars, making it a clear leader of the British toy car industry. In 1966 Corgi won both The Queen's Award to Industry and the National Association of Toy Retailers' Highest Standards Award, two prestigious awards. In March 1969, a year's supply was destroyed in the factory in Fforestfach in Swansea by a fire, a major setback, which cut profits tremendously. Despite this, Corgi continued to remain among top collectables for many years.

Sales increased in the late 1960s and early 1970s after the James Bond Aston Martin DB5 and the Chitty Chitty Bang Bang car was released, but sales were fell sharply after the 1969 fire, which led to substantial ground being lost to its main rival Dinky, but by 1971, the Swansea factory was back to full production again after major repairs costing over £1.3 million. The Queen's silver jubilee model edition released in 1977 was an instant best-seller, along with another nostalgia model, Edward VII's coronation state coach of 1901. After a rapid decline in sales, in 1983 economic analysts said that decline was inevitable; children and adults had moved on to more sophisticated toys, others however did not agree; they believed if it had not been for the fire there would have been no problem.

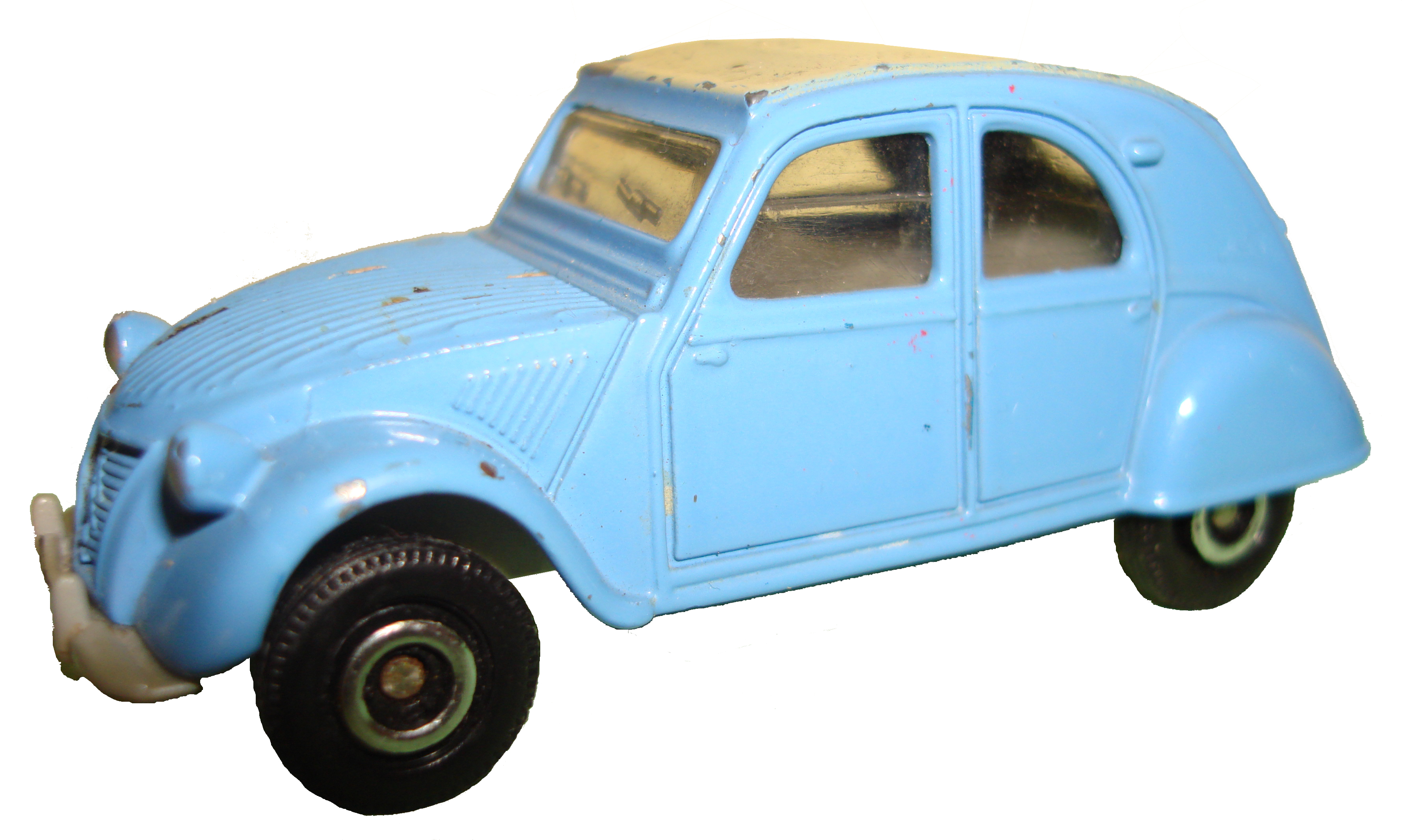
A Corgi Citroën 2CV, promotional for FINA

Corgi reformed as Corgi Toys Limited in 1984 and turned its attention to regaining the British toy company's confidence. Three years later Corgi turned to the export market for profits, soon distributing in Australia, Continental Europe and the United States. Shortly after this Corgi started the Collectors Club, which quickly gained worldwide membership.

In 1989 the company was taken over by Mattel, the worldwide toy manufacturing giant (manufacturer of Barbie Dolls and Hot Wheels cars), and production was moved to Leicester, the Mattel headquarters. Corgi then introduced a new range: Corgi Classics, selling nostalgia cars, vans and trucks from the 1930s, 1940s, 1950s and 1960s, aimed at those who had grown up during that period. At around the same period in the US, Corgi released a new range of trucks, fire tenders and buses based on North American prototypes, though these were not as successful as had been hoped.

=== Corgi Classics Limited ===
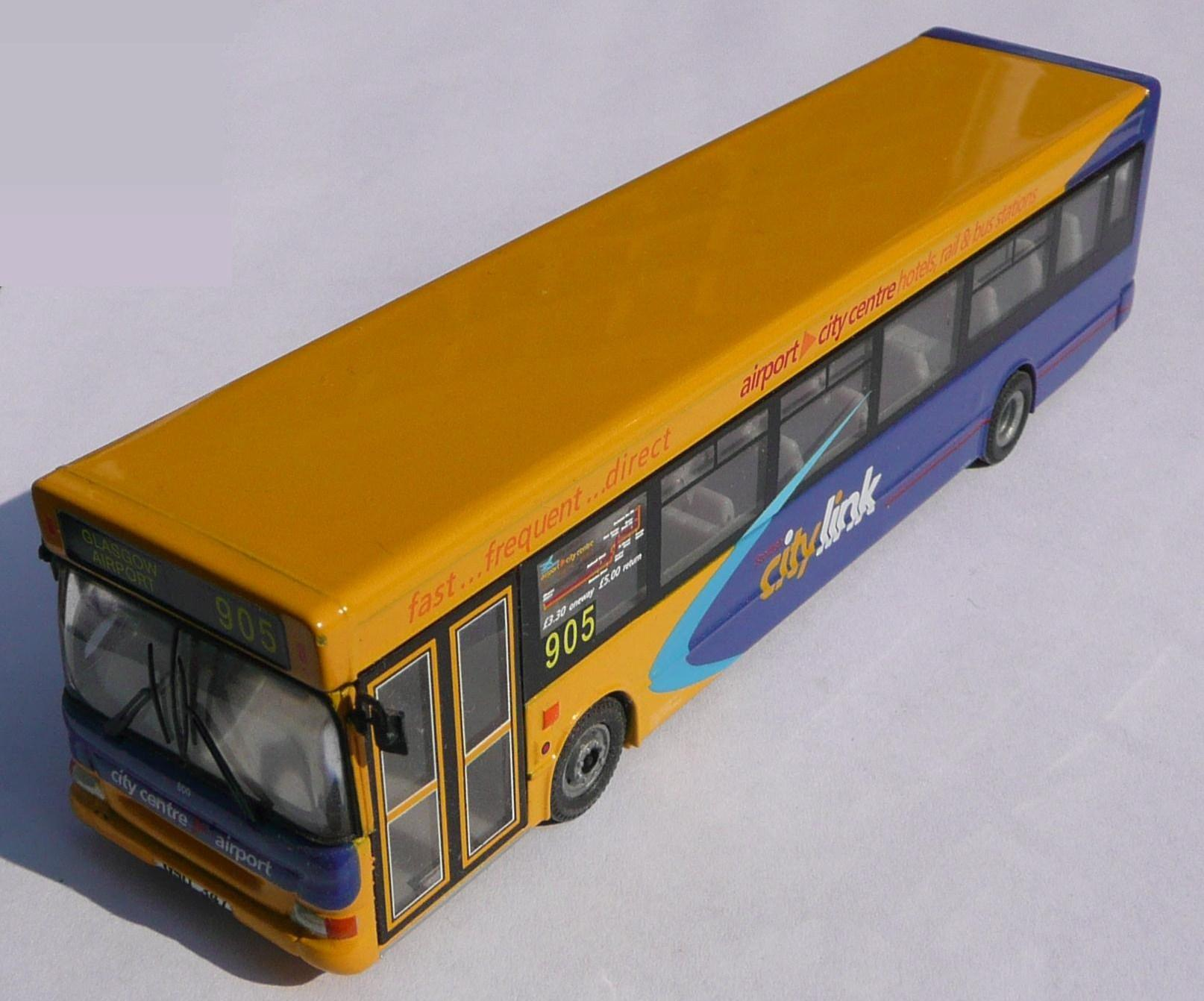
A Corgi model bus. Buses are mainly produced under the Original Omnibus Company brand

In 1995, Corgi was sold by Mattel in a management buyout and moved to new premises in Leicester. Corgi Classics turned to British television for model ideas, and soon released models such as Mr. Bean's Mini, Inspector Morse's Jaguar Mark 2 and later models based on Enid Blyton's Noddy tales. A variety of firms ranging from Cadbury's chocolate to Guinness beer to Eddie Stobart haulage have had Corgi scale models made of their road vehicles. In 1995 Corgi introduced a new range of 1/76th scale UK and Hong Kong bus models under the Original Omnibus Company banner; by 2007, the total number of individual model releases in this sub-range had exceeded eight hundred.

In 1999 Corgi Classics Limited was taken over by Zindart, an American collectors specialists. By 2000, as in the 1960s, Corgi was once again the top British model maker. That same year, Corgi bought the rights to the Lledo name (and many of the moulds), taking over the popular Days Gone series. The Vanguards series was also acquired in the deal. Days Gone and Vanguards models were sold by Corgi under the Lledo moniker until 2004, after which the Lledo name was dropped and the models officially became part of the Corgi Classics line.

In 1999, Corgi debuted the Aviation Archive line of diecast military aeroplanes. Beginning with 1/144 scale, Corgi created one of the most expansive and widely collected lines of highly detailed limited edition collectable die-cast metal aircraft. This line has been expanded in successive years to include new moulds and liveries and even new scales, such as the super-detailed 1/32 scale Aviation Archive line. Corgi followed with a new line of 1/50 scale armoured vehicles ranging from World War II up to through the Vietnam War. In 2006, Corgi began selling hand painted, spin-cast metal figures and soldiers in the Forward March series which complements their 1/32 and 1/50 scale lines of vehicles.

In May 2008, international models and collectables group Hornby announced the acquisition of Corgi Classics Limited for £8.3 million. Under Hornby ownership the Corgi brand underwent a rebrand in 2012, this saw the introduction of a new logo and style of packaging, however the main element reasoning behind the change was the relaunch of Corgi Toys.

In 2019 a new series was launched called: CORGI CHUNKIES is new range of toys with moving interactive parts, free-rolling, soft-tyred wheels, left and right hand drive and a strong child-proof build. The chunkies models were designed by Hanan Shpetrick.

== Famous models ==
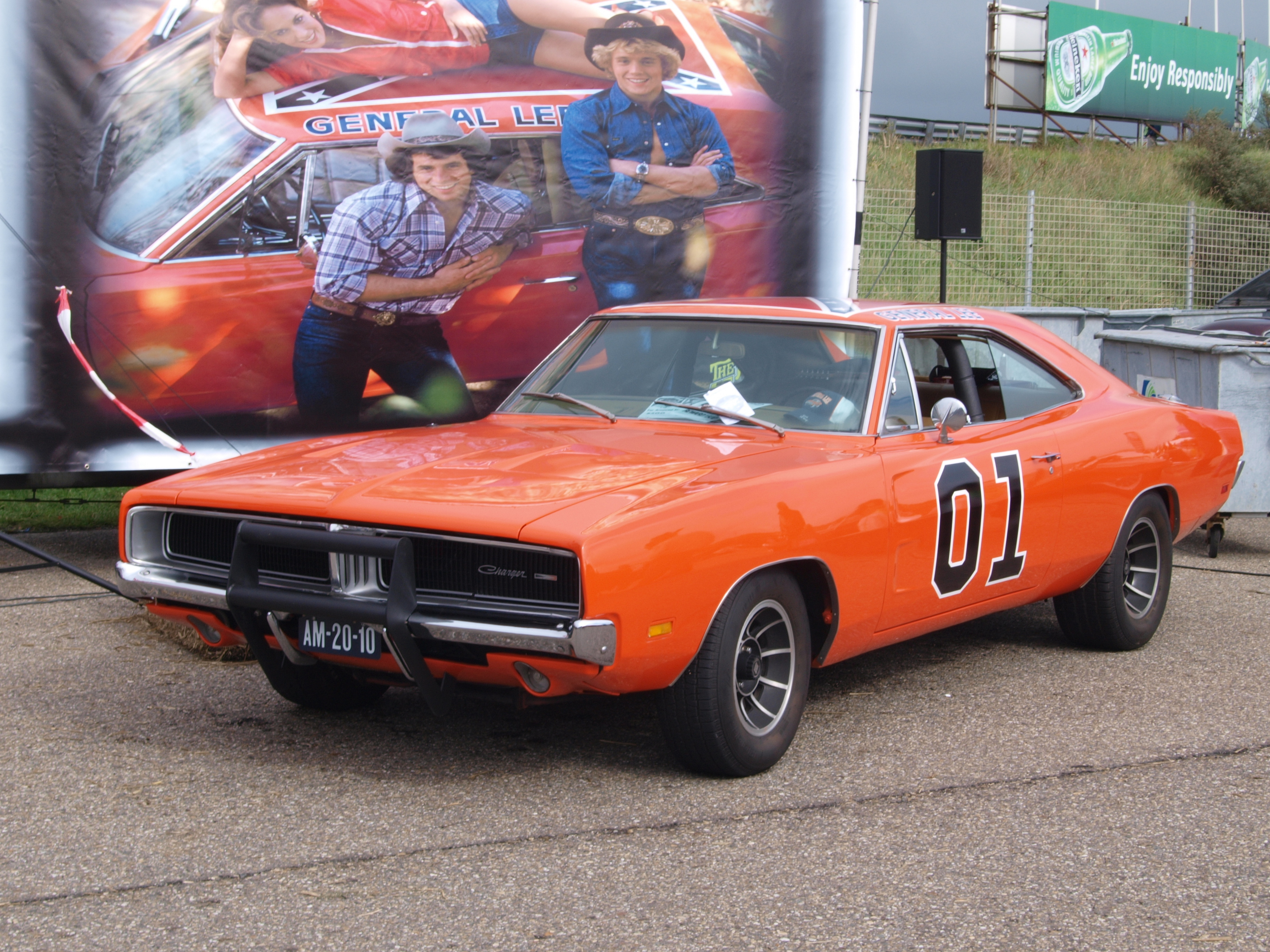
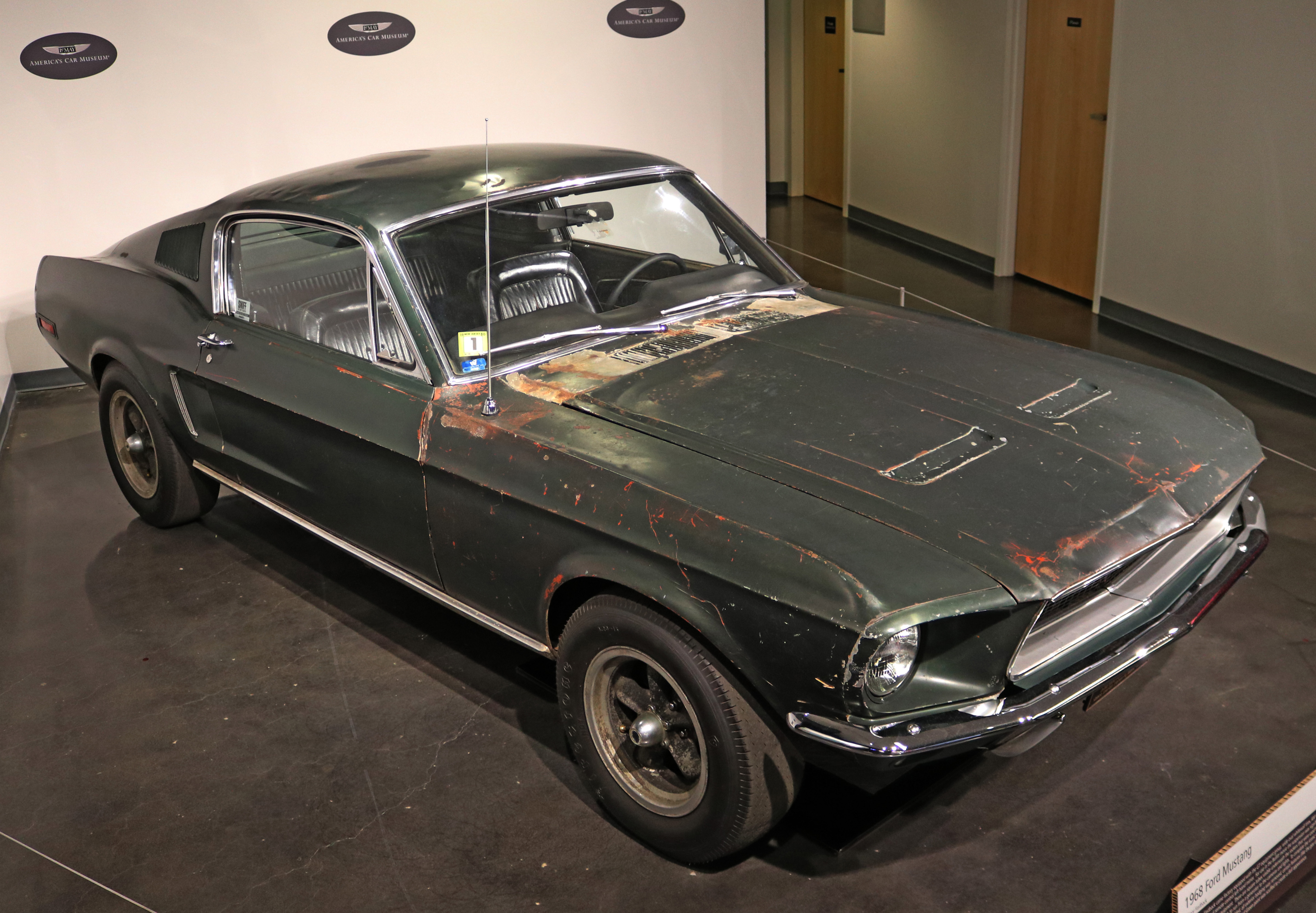
The Dukes of Hazzard's General Lee (left) and Bullitt's Ford Mustang have been some of the scale models produced by Corgi Classics since its inception as an independent company

This is a list of a few of the most famous Corgi Classics limited models:

- Inspector Morse's Jaguar Mark 2
- Mr. Bean's Mini
- The Italian Job's Mini
- Doctor Who's TARDIS and Daleks
- The Dukes of Hazzard's Dodge Charger with Bo and Luke figures
- Basil Fawlty's Austin 1100
- USS Enterprise (NCC-1701-D) and some other Star Trek ships, including Romulan and Klingon vessels.
- Bullitt's Ford Mustang with Steve McQueen figure.
- Only Fools and Horses Reliant Supervan III.
- The line of James Bond cars.
- The new line Corgi Chunkies.
