= Corgi Toys =

Toy vehicle brand

- Product type: Die cast toy
- Current owner: Hornby (2008–present)
- Country: Great Britain, UK
- Introduced: 1956; 70 years ago
- Related brands: Dinky; Husky
- Markets: Worldwide
- Previous owners: Mettoy (1956–84); Mattel (1989–95); Corgi Classics Ltd. (1995–2008)
- Website: corgi.co.uk

Corgi Toys (trademark) is a British brand of die-cast toy vehicles created by Mettoy and currently owned by Hornby, after it acquired the Corgi Classics Limited Company in 2008.

The Mettoy ("Metal Toy") company was founded in 1933 by German émigré Philip Ullmann in Northampton, England, where he was later joined by South African–born German Arthur Katz, who had previously worked for Ullmann at his toy company Tipp and Co of Nuremberg. After dabbling for some years in the model car market, they decided to produce a range of die-cast toy vehicles as competition to Meccano's Dinky model cars, which had dominated the British market for many years. "Corgi Toys" were introduced in the UK in July 1956 and were manufactured in Swansea, Wales, for 27 years before the company went into liquidation. A management buy-out re-formed the company as Corgi Toys Limited in March 1984. In 1989, the management sold the Corgi brand to Mattel and the factory was retained under the name of "Microlink Industries Ltd". In 1995, Corgi regained its independence as a new company, Corgi Classics Limited, and moved to new premises in Leicester. The Corgi brand was acquired by Hornby in 2008.

The range was exported worldwide and sold in large numbers. Some of the best known and most popular models were of cars made famous in film and television such as the Batmobile, Chitty Chitty Bang Bang and James Bond's Aston Martin DB5 – which remains the largest selling toy car ever produced. Although the largest single vehicle type featured in the Corgi Toys range were models of cars from manufacturers around the world, this article sub-divides vehicles into genres, wherever possible, to allow a more detailed look at the variety of models produced by the company.

== Early history ==
204 Rover 90 and 205 Riley Pathfinder

Mettoy became established in Northampton and within six years of the company's founding, the Northampton factory had 600 employees. A production plant was built at Fforestfach in Swansea, South Wales, to manufacture the new range of Corgi Toys. This provided many new jobs in an area of high unemployment following the scaling down of local coal mining operations.

Prior to the introduction of Corgi Toys, Mettoy mainly produced tin plate toys. However, in the early 1950s, they began producing a few products in cast metal. The first was a large scale wind-up racer made with a cast aluminium body and tin plate wheels. The body material was soon changed to die cast zinc and it was refitted with cast wheels and moulded rubber tyres. Other models followed and the product line was given the name "Castoys." These were the direct ancestors of Corgi Toys.

305 Triumph TR3

The name 'Corgi Toys' was chosen by Philip Ullmann in honour of the company's new home, taken from the Welsh breed of dog, the Corgi, and the iconic Corgi dog logo branded the new range. The name was short and easy to remember, further aligning the range with their rival Dinky Toys. Corgi Toys also included plastic glazing, which lent the models a greater authenticity, and they carried the advertising slogan "the ones with windows".

The 1956 releases were all familiar British vehicles. Six family saloon cars; Ford Consul (200/200M), Austin A50 Cambridge (201/201M), Morris Cowley (202/202M), Vauxhall Velox (203/203M), Rover 90 (204/204M), Riley Pathfinder (205/205M) and Hillman Husky (206/206M), and two sports cars; Austin-Healey 100 (300) and Triumph TR2 (301).

Initially, models were issued both in free-rolling form, and (except the larger commercial vehicles and sports cars with low-slung bodies) with friction drive motors. The Mechanical versions, as they were known, were indicated by an 'M' suffix to the model number and were produced in different colour schemes. They were issued with tougher die-cast bases to support the extra weight of the motor. Mechanical versions did not sell as well as the free-rolling versions, partly due to a significantly higher purchase price, and were phased out in 1960 with Ford Thunderbird (214M) the last of the line. One particular problem that was not anticipated was that it was possible to lubricate the "motor" using oil through a hole in the base, but the oil tended to splatter around inside and cloud up the windows. The rigid die-case bases which were are originally limited to the "M" versions were retained and became the standard for Corgi toys.

== Expansion and innovation ==
309 Aston Martin DB4 Competition Model

British cars dominated the releases at the beginning, reflecting the company's concentration on the home market, but by 1957 new markets were being explored and the first European car to be modelled was the Citroën DS19 (210) issued in December of that year. The first American car, the Studebaker Golden Hawk (211/211M), was released in February 1958 and by the early 1960s the Corgi range was being exported widely, finding particular popularity in Europe, Australia, Canada, the United States of America and areas of southeast Asia such as Singapore, Malaysia and Hong Kong, and gradually more foreign vehicles were included to appeal to these new markets.

241 Ghia L6.4

Models were issued on a monthly basis and the range grew quickly to include vehicles of all types. Gradually the models became more sophisticated with the addition of such features as 'Glidamatic' spring suspension and a detailed interior on the Renault Floride (222) in October 1959, and the fibre-optic style 'Trans-o-Lite' illuminating lights system first seen on the Superior Air-Ground Ambulance Service on Cadillac Chassis (437) in October 1962. The early type of interior which was known as 'vac-formed', was produced by stretching a thin sheet of acetate over a mould by means of a vacuum, and lasted for three years until being replaced by the crisper, more detailed injection-moulded type first seen in the Thames 'Airborne' caravan (420) in February 1962.

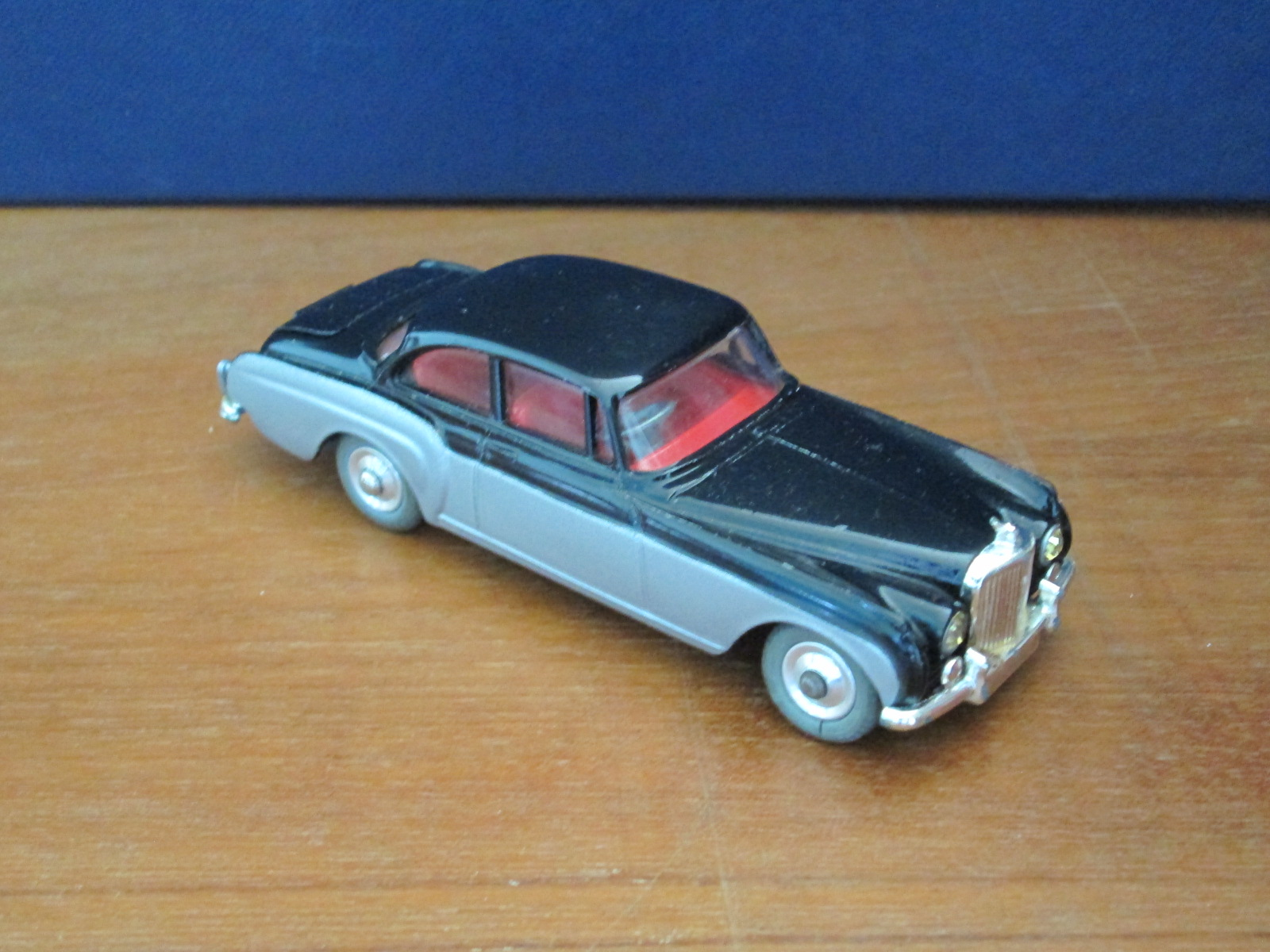
224 Bentley Continental

The Corgi design team came up with the first model with an opening feature in February 1960, the Aston Martin DB4 (218) which had an opening bonnet. Steerable front wheels, jewelled headlights and rear lights and an opening boot complete with spare wheel were added on the Bentley Continental Sports Saloon (224) in April 1961, and by October 1963 with the release of the Ghia L6.4 (241) new levels of authenticity were reached. This model featured a number of 'firsts' with not only an opening bonnet, but also opening doors and boot, and a detailed interior with a rear view mirror, folding front seats, and even a model corgi dog sitting on the rear parcel shelf. At introduction, the Ghia sold for eight shillings and sixpence, and even at this relatively high price around 1.7 million were sold before being withdrawn in 1969. By contrast, only twenty five examples of the real car were completed! Another popular model was the Jaguar Mark X (#238; 1962–1967) — over 1.1 million were sold, and hardly any other model was released in as many colours.

In 1964, Mettoy introduced a range of smaller scale vehicles called Husky Toys. These retailed at a lower retail price and were available exclusively through F.W.Woolworth & Co, and were designed to venture into the market dominated for many years by Lesney's Matchbox range.

== Corgi Classics ==
In 1964 Corgi diversified into the adult collector market and released a range of highly detailed models of vintage cars called 'Corgi Classics'. Marketed at a higher price point than Lesney's Matchbox 'Models of Yesteryear', they met with mixed success. Initial releases were a 1927 Bentley finished in green (9001) or red (9002), an open 1915 Ford Model T coloured black (9011) and yellow (9012), and a version finished in blue with the hood raised (9013), a 1910 Daimler 38 finished in red (9021) and a 1911 Renault 12/16 finished in lavender (9031) or pale yellow (9032).

Two years later, a 1912 Rolls-Royce Silver Ghost coloured silver (9041) was added to the range, which was updated in 1970 to feature American TV stars The Hardy Boys, discussed later in this article. A Ford Model T van in Lyons Tea livery (9014) appeared in the 1967 Corgi catalogue but was never released. The Corgi Classics range was discontinued in 1969, although the name was later revived for a range of adult collectable models in the 1980s.

== Corgi Major Toys ==
Following the success of the Dinky Supertoys range of die-cast trucks, Corgi decided to launch a range of heavy commercial vehicles in October 1957 with the release of the Carrimore Car Transporter (1101) featuring a Bedford S-Type tractor unit with full glazing in keeping with the rest of the Corgi range, and the company's first gift set including the Carrimore Car Transporter and four cars (GS1); Austin Cambridge (201), Jaguar 2.4 (208), Austin-Healey (300) and MGA (302) in time for the Christmas market in December 1957.

Early models in the new 'Corgi Major' range were issued in sturdy two piece boxes featuring the blue and yellow colour scheme that had recently been adopted across the entire Corgi range, later models in the 1960s using clear fronted packaging in line with the rest of the Corgi Toys range. The Carrimore Low Loader (1100) was the next release in April 1958 which was a low loader trailer attached to the Bedford cab and was followed by the similar Machinery Carrier low loader (1104) in September 1958. In November 1958 the Euclid TC12 Bulldozer (1102) was issued. A large earth mover which was being widely used in the construction of the M1, the UK's first motorway, the Euclid factory was only two miles from Corgi headquarters which allowed easy access to all the data required to produce a very accurate model. April 1959 saw the release of the Bedford Fuel Tanker in the red livery of 'Mobilgas' (1110) and this model was revamped in pale blue and white as the Bedford Milk Tanker (1129) in May 1962, and both were later re-issued with a more modern Bedford TK cab.

The Midland Red Motor Express Coach (1120), issued in March 1960, was a model of the latest high speed coach for the motorway age fitted with a turbo-charged engine and capable of 100 mph, and a model of the pioneering SR.N1 hovercraft (1119) was released in June 1960. In November 1962 the new Bedford TK cab unit was also fitted to the existing Carrimore Car Transporter (1105) and was also included in a new Car Transporter Gift Set (GS28) in December 1963 along with four cars; Ford Consul Classic (234), Mercedes-Benz 220 SE (230), Renault Floride (222) and Fiat 2100 (232). The Ecurie Ecosse Racing Transporter (1126) issued in October 1961 was a racing car transporter custom built for the Scottish motor racing team Ecurie Ecosse, with room for three cars and an on-board workshop.

The Corgi model featured operational ramps, a sliding door revealing the workshop complete with a miniature lathe, operational steering, and was finished in authentic dark blue. Racing Transporter Set (GS16) was also released in October 1961 featuring the Ecurie Ecosse transporter along with three racing cars; Vanwall (150), BRM (156) and [Lotus XI] (151).

The Simon Snorkel Aerial Rescue Truck (1127) was issued in September 1964. This model fire engine was based on a Bedford TK chassis and featured an extendable centre-hinged arm with rescue cradle complete with fire fighter figure holding a die-cast water cannon which could be manoeuvred by means of a rotating base and wheels and gears. The model stayed in the range until being updated with a more modern Dennis cab (1126) in June 1977.

1142 Holmes Wrecker Recovery Vehicle

A new cab unit was introduced in September 1965. The Ford H Cab and Detachable Trailer (1137) was an American truck produced by Corgi to appeal to the lucrative US market and featured a forward tilting cab revealing a highly detailed engine, realistic moveable door mirrors and die-cast metal air horns and side ladders. The large box trailer featured sliding side doors, opening rear doors and was finished in the blue and silver 'Express Services' livery. The leap in quality of this model proved that the Major range had entered a new era, and it continued to sell well until 1972. The new Ford cab was used again in April 1966 with a new version of the Carrimore Car Transporter (1138) which had been re-designed to carry up to six Corgi cars, and which also featured in Gift Set 41 along with six cars; Ford Cortina Estate (440), Rover 2000 (252), Hillman Imp (251), Mini Cooper De-Luxe (249), Austin Seven (225) and Mini Cooper Monte Carlo 1966 (321). This gift set was initially only available by mail order but was finally issued in time for Christmas in December 1967.

The Holmes Wrecker Recovery Vehicle (1142) issued in May 1967 was also based on the Ford H series tractor unit, and featured twin boom die-cast recovery cranes with hooks attached to cotton lines that could be extended by winding a pair of spare wheels attached to the sides of the vehicle, and also included were two model mechanics previously seen with the 'Express Services' truck. The American LaFrance Aerial Rescue Truck (1143) was added to the Major range in October 1968 and was a highly detailed model of a tiller/ladder truck (or hook and ladder) from the United States of America. It featured an extendable ladder on a rotating base complete with plastic ladder extensions and model firemen and has recently been re-issued by the modern Corgi company in a number of authentic liveries.

The Carrimore Car Transporter Mark IV using the recently introduced Scammell cab was also released in April 1969 and a gift set (GS48) featuring the new transporter and six cars; MGC GT (345), Mini Cooper Monte Carlo 1967 (339), Sunbeam Imp Monte Carlo 1967 (340), Mini Cooper S Magnifique (334), Morris Mini Minor (226) and The Saint's Volvo P1800 (258) soon followed. By October 1970 the Carrimore Car Transporter Mark V (1146) had grown to three decks and Gift Set 20 again featured the transporter complete with six cars now fitted with Whizzwheels; Lancia Fulvia Zagato (372), Marcos 3 Litre (377), MGC GT (378), Ford Capri 3 Litre (311), The Saint's Volvo P1800 (201) and Pontiac Firebird (343). The colour schemes applied to some cars in the Car Transporter Gift Sets were unique to models included in these sets, such as the MGC GT (345) finished in orange, and today are particularly collectable. The Scammell Handyman Ferrymasters Truck (1147) issued in December 1969, proved to be the last new application for the Scammell cab and was finished in the authentic yellow and white livery of the Ferrymasters haulage company.

The Major range continued into the 1970s but along with the Corgi Toys range suffered somewhat from the constraints on development budgets that the company was forced to make. The Mercedes-Benz Unimog and snowplough (1150) was released in February 1971 and another American cab unit was introduced in October 1971. The new Mack was coupled with a fuel tanker in the livery of "Esso" (1152) in October 1971 and a Transcontinental trailer (1100) in November 1971, and fitted with an updated version of the Priestman Cub Shovel now converted to become a crane in October 1972 as the Mack Priestman Crane Truck (1154).

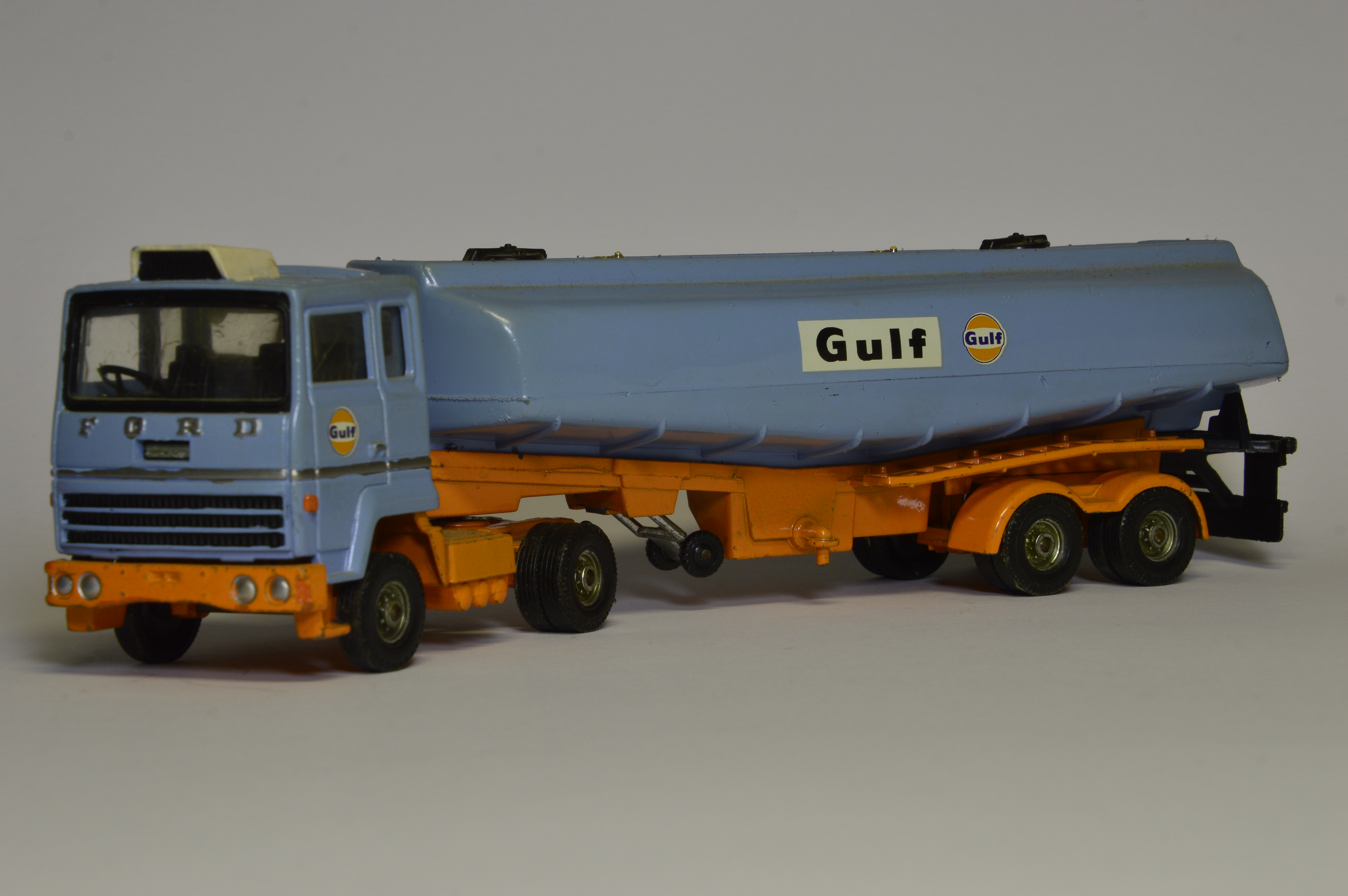
1160 Corgi Major Ford Transcontinental tank truck Gulf from 1976

A new Berliet cab was introduced in May 1974 as the Crane Fruehauf Discharge Dumper (1102), a large articulated aggregate carrier for use on construction sites, and the new cab was also used as the Berliet Wrecker Truck (1144) in March 1975 updating the aforementioned Holmes Wrecker, which had been in the range since 1967. The Pathfinder Airport Crash Truck (1103) released in September 1974 had won the Design Council Engineering Award for its manufacturer Chubb, and the Corgi miniature included an internal water tank allowing water to be squirted through die-cast water cannons by pumping a rubber bulb. Another new cab was introduced in April 1976: The Ford Transcontinental was designed for long range treks across the European continent and was first issued coupled to the fuel tanker previously seen with the earlier Mack cab, also in 'Esso' livery (1157) or "Gulf" livery (1160), and, later in February 1982, in the livery of "Guinness" (1169).

== Circus vehicle models ==
The Chipperfield's Circus Crane Truck (1121) was the first of the highly successful and much sought after range of Chipperfield's Circus vehicles produced by Corgi Toys during the 1960s, and was issued in October 1960. It was based on a large International truck fitted with a metal crane, hook and pulley, and painted in the traditional Chipperfield's Circus livery of red and blue, as were all the models in the range. It was followed by the Circus Animal Cage Trailer (1123) in January 1961 which featured two two-part opening doors revealing a large cage with metal bars.

These two models were later packaged together as the Chipperfield's Circus Set (GS12). An updated version of the Karrier Bantam Mobile Butcher Shop was introduced in January 1962 as the Circus Booking Office (426). The window insert of the original depicting joints of meat was replaced with a new one with circus advertising posters. In April 1962 the existing Land Rover 109 model was issued along with a trailer carrying a large cage and a model elephant as Chipperfield's Circus Land Rover and Elephant Cage on Trailer (GS19).

The Chipperfield's Circus Vehicles Set (GS23) was issued in September 1962 featuring all the Chipperfield's models released to date, and today this is one of the most desirable gift sets issued by the company. The Chipperfield's Circus Horse Transporter (1130) was released in October 1962 featuring the new Bedford TK tractor unit and an articulated trailer with models of circus horses, and in June 1964 the Bedford TK tractor unit was adapted with a large high-sided open top 'wooden' box as the Giraffe Transporter (503) complete with models of a mother and baby giraffe.

The Land Rover, which had been adapted as a 'Vote For Corgi' campaigning vehicle as a tie-in with the 1964 UK General Election, was re-issued in September 1965 in the red and blue colours of Chipperfield's as the Chipperfield's Circus Parade Vehicle (487) with a clown and chimpanzee replacing the political canvassers of the original, and a 'The Circus is Here' banner across the bonnet. The Chipperfield's Circus Menagerie Transporter (1139) which was released in October 1968 featured a new Scammell Handyman cab and a flatbed articulated trailer which carried a load of three clear plastic boxes designed to represent cages, each containing models of lions, bears and tigers.

The Chipperfield's Circus Crane and Cage (1144), issued in April 1969, again featured the Scammell tractor unit but modified using the Holmes Wrecker platform with a large crane mounted on a pivoting base to the rear, and included another of the clear plastic animal cages with a model rhinoceros inside. The final model in the Chipperfield's Circus range was released in January 1970. The Chipperfield's Performing Poodles Pick Up (511) was an update of the earlier Kennel Club Wagon (itself an adaptation of the Chevrolet Impala first issued in 1960) and included model poodles and trainer.

There were no further circus related releases until the Jean Richard Circus Set (GS48) which was issued in November 1978. This large set included models of the new 1/36 scale Land Rover Estate and Chevrolet Van which had been updated to become a parade vehicle and mobile booking office respectively. Also included were an animal cage trailer and models of horses and an elephant and figures of a clown and a ringmaster, together with various Big Top accessories.

Another circus themed release was the Berliet tractor unit which had been adapted to become a human cannonball launcher complete with die-cast cannon attached to the rear and a human cannonball figure that could be fired from the cannon by means of depressing a button.

== Competition models ==
151A Lotus XI

Throughout the company's history, Corgi Toys have been closely associated with modelling Grand Prix and Formula 1 racing cars. The first issued was the Vanwall Grand Prix car (150) issued in July 1957. Finished in green and carrying racing number 3, it was a scale model of the car driven by Stirling Moss. This was followed in December 1958 by a BRM Grand Prix car (106) also with green paintwork, and both cars featured in the Racing Car Set (GS5) from 1958, along with the Lotus XI Le Mans racing car (151) from July 1958. The Vanwall, however, had been re-coloured red.

It was followed in December 1964 by the Lotus-Climax F1 car (155). Finished in an authentic British Racing Green and carrying racing number 1, it represented Jim Clark's 1963 world championship winning Lotus 25, and in 1967 it was joined by the Cooper-Maserati F1 car (156) painted blue. The Lotus-Climax and the Cooper-Maserati were re-engineered in 1969 to include steerable front wheels operated by moving the driver from side to side, and a high level rear wing in the style of real Formula 1 cars of the time. They were re-coloured orange in the case of the Lotus-Climax (158) and yellow in the case of the Cooper-Maserati (159). A Lotus Racing Car set (GS37) was issued in August 1966 containing the Lotus-Climax F1 car, two Lotus Elans and a Volkswagen breakdown tow truck. Another Ferrari was issued in February 1965, the Ferrari Berlinetta (314) (Ferrari 250 LM) which had competed at the 1964 Le Mans 24 Hour race, and in May 1967 another successful sports racer, the Porsche Carrera 6 (330) (Porsche 906), was released.

In 1972 Corgi worked with the newly formed Grand Prix Association to produce a series of 1/36 scale Formula 1 racing cars. The first was the Yardley McLaren M19A (151) driven by New Zealander and 1967 World Champion Denny Hulme which was followed by the Brooke Bond Oxo Surtees TS9 driven by 1964 World Champion John Surtees (150), later followed by a Surtees TS9B in the livery of Italian sponsors 'Pagnossin', driven by Andrea de Adamich (153).

These were the first models produced in the larger 1/36 scale instead of the familiar O scale preferred by Dinky and Corgi up to this date (varying between 1/43 to about 1/50 for larger vehicles). Within five years the whole Corgi range would be replaced by vehicles in 1/36 scale.

1973 saw the release of Jacky Ickx's Ferrari 312 B2 (152) and the John Player Special Lotus 72 (154) of World Champion (1972 and 1974) Emerson Fittipaldi or Ronnie Peterson, and in 1974 the Shadow F1 car was issued in both UOP livery (155) as driven by Jackie Oliver, and as Graham Hill's Embassy Shadow (156). Scottish multiple World Champion Jackie Stewart's Elf Tyrrell F1 car (158) was also released along with the STP Patrick Eagle (159) driven to victory in the 1973 Indianapolis 500 by Gordon Johncock.

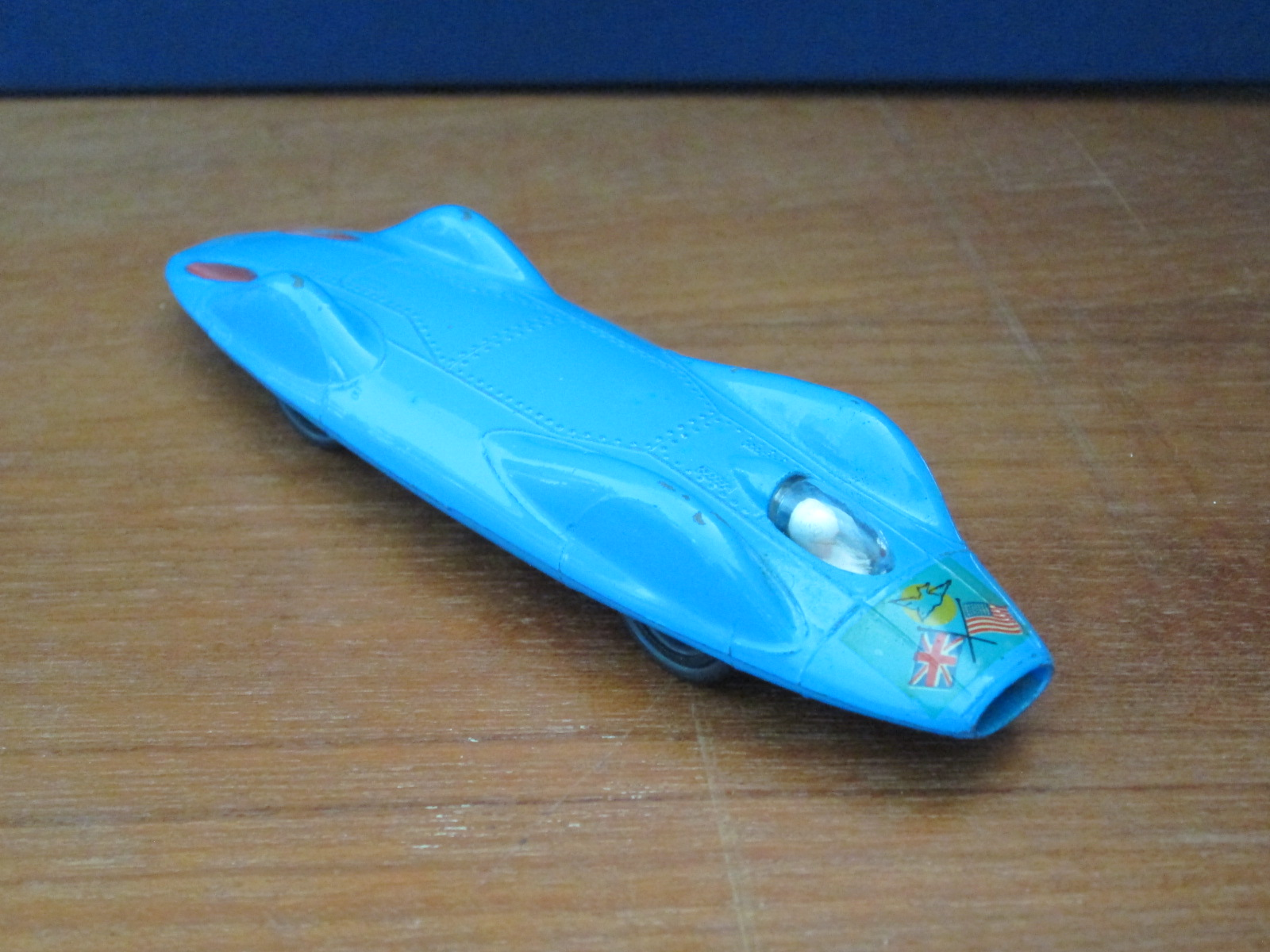
153 Proteus-Campbell Bluebird

The final two models in the series were the Hesketh 308 F1 car (190) driven by future English World Champion James Hunt issued in 1976, and the six wheeled Tyrrell Project 34 driven by Frenchman Patrick Depailler issued in Elf livery (161) in 1977 and First National City Travellers Checks livery (162) which was released in 1978. Two Formula 1 cars were also issued in 1/18 scale, the John Player Special Lotus 72 (190) in 1974 and the Marlboro McLaren (191) in 1975.

The Proteus-Campbell Bluebird Record Car (153) was issued in September 1960 and was modelled on the vehicle with which Donald Campbell was to set a new Land Speed Record on 17 July 1964. The Corgi design team were given extensive access to the real car in order to produce their scale model, even receiving paint samples to enable them to create an exact colour match. However, a lighter blue was chosen for the model eventually. An example of the model was presented to Donald Campbell by young members of the Corgi Club.

475 Citroen DS Safari 1964 Winter Olympics & 499 Citroen DS Safari 1968 Grenoble Olympics

Models following themes were released over the years. In January 1964, Corgi updated the existing Citroën DS Safari to become a promotional vehicle for the 1964 Winter Olympics (475), complete with a skier figure, four model skis and two model ski poles. Painted white and with a decal of the Olympic rings logo on the bonnet, this model then reverted to a 'Corgi Ski Club' version the following year.

It was revamped again in November 1967 for the 1968 Winter Olympics (499), this time painted white with a blue roof, and with a model toboggan on the roof rack along with a figure of a tobogganist and a pair of skis and poles, and a stylish 'Grenoble Olympiade 1968' decal on the bonnet. The final version introduced in 1970 was an Alpine Rescue vehicle (510), painted white with a red roof and which came complete with figures of a St Bernard dog and rescuer, and today is the rarest of the versions.

340 Sunbeam Imp 1967 Monte Carlo Rally, 322 Rover 2000 1965 Monte Carlo Rally, 339 Mini Cooper S 1967 Monte Carlo Rally

The Monte Carlo Rally, held annually in January, provided a rich source of model cars between 1964 and 1967. By following the event closely, Corgi Toys were able to issue a model of the winning car shortly after the end of the rally Often there was not even enough time to produce a unique box for the new model, which had to make do with a hastily produced sticker applied to a standard issue box for a similar model.

The 1964 winner, Paddy Hopkirk's Mini Cooper S (317) released in February 1964, featured jewelled headlights and a rally lamp on the roof, and was finished in the BMC team colours of red with a white roof with authentic Monte Carlo Rally transfers. Three Monte Carlo Rally cars were issued in 1965, the winning Mini Cooper S of Timo Mäkinen (321) in February, finished in the same red with a white roof, and three jewelled rally lamps, and in April a Rover 2000 (322) in maroon with a white roof with two jewelled rally lamps in the grill and a Citroën DS21 (323) with four small jewelled rally lamps and finished in pale blue with a white roof complete with roof aerial.

All three of these models were available in the Monte Carlo Gift Set (GS38) also issued in April 1965; a highly prized set for today's collector. Another Mini Cooper S in Monte Carlo Rally finish was issued the January of following year complete with two jewelled rally lamps in the grille and the signatures of the driver Timo Mäkinen and his co-driver Paul Easter printed on the roof. The model number 321 was carried over from the 1965 car. A Hillman Imp was also issued as a Monte Carlo Rally car (328), finished in blue with a white flash along the sides and two jewelled rally lamps, and was driven by an all-female team of Rosemary Smith and Valerie Domleo in the 1966 event.

1967 was the final year that Corgi issued Monte Carlo Rally cars, and the famous Mini Cooper S (339) appeared yet again in March, this time with four jewelled rally lamps in the grill, a sump guard and two spare wheels on a roof rack borrowed from the 'Surfing' Mini Traveller (485) from 1965. The 1967 Monte Carlo Rally Mini Cooper S stayed in the Corgi range until 1972, spanning two different castings. Another Mini Cooper S (333) was released in February 1967 carrying the same red and white paintwork, but as campaigned in the 1967 RAC/Sun rally by Tony Fall and Mike Wood, along with another Rover 2000 (322) from the same event finished in white with a matt black bonnet. The final rally car was the Sunbeam Imp (340) issued in March 1967, which featured four jewelled rally lamps and was finished in blue with a white flash and front panel. In December 1965 a Volkswagen 1200 Beetle was issued in East African Safari finish (256). This model featured an opening boot and engine cover and steerable front wheels operated by a spare tyre on the roof of the car.

Three years later, in July 1969, Corgi issued the winning Hillman Hunter from the 1968 London to Sydney Marathon (302), complete with Take-Off Wheels, roof mounted tool box and a plastic kangaroo guard across the front of the car. This time the packaging included a model kangaroo and details of the event, and in February 1970 a model of the unique 4wd Ford Capri 3-Litre rally car (303) driven by Roger Clark was released. A model of the successful Datsun 240Z rally car in East African Safari Finish (394) was issued in October 1972 and in May 1973 the Datsun 240Z was also issued in "US Rally" finish (396). This, in fact, was an authentic model of John Morton's 300 bhp BRE-Datsun 240Z which won the 1970 and 1971 SCCA class C/P championships. The Ferrari 365GTB/4 Daytona as raced at the 1973 Le Mans 24 Hours race, with JCB and Corgi sponsorship (324), was released in June 1973 along with another in white/red/blue livery inspired by a 1972 Le Mans entry (323). In July 1973 the Porsche-Audi 917/10 (397) from the Can-Am race series was issued with L&M cigarette sponsorship.

In the early 1970s Corgi Toys issued a range of dragsters in response not only to the increased interest in this form of motorsport in the UK, focused on the Santa Pod Raceway in Northamptonshire, but also the attention brought to these vehicles by Mattel's Hot Wheels. The first to be released was the 'Quartermaster' Dragster (162) in April 1971, closely followed by the 'Commuter' Dragster (161) in June. Both were models of real vehicles, and were of the 'rail' dragster variety.

The first 'Funny Car' dragster was the Santa Pod "Gloworm" Dragster (163) issued in July 1971, and which was based on the existing Ford Capri 3-Litre casting. Modifications allowed the body to be hinged from the rear, and by pressing a button secreted in the front bumper the entire body rose, by means of a spring, to reveal a roll cage and driver within and a detailed V8 engine. The next release was a figment of the Corgi design team's imagination. The "Organ Grinder" Mustang Funny Car (166), which was issued in October 1971, was purely an update of the Ford Mustang (320) first seen in 1965, complete with huge rear wheels and headers resembling organ pipes fitted to the V8 engine. In December 1971 the Ison Brothers "Wild Honey" Dragster (164) was released which was a fully customised 'gasser' based on a 1930s Austin Seven saloon. The Adams Brothers "Drag-Star" (165) released in February 1972 was a four engined machine produced in conjunction with designers the Adams Brothers, and the earlier "Quartermaster" Dragster was updated in October 1972 as the John Woolfe Radio Luxembourg 208 Dragster (170).

== Film and television models ==
=== 1960s ===
Corgi Toys introduced the first of the many film and television tie-in models that made the company famous in March 1965, with The Saint's Volvo P1800 (258) from the British television series The Saint starring Roger Moore. This was an update of the existing Volvo P1800 model that had been issued in 1962, now finished in white and featuring The Saint's logo on the bonnet and a model of The Saint in the drivers seat. The Corgi executives were impressed by how The Saint version sold in much larger numbers than the regular version, despite the fact that on the TV there was no Saint's logo on the car. With the second in the range of film and TV related models Corgi revolutionised the British toy car industry.

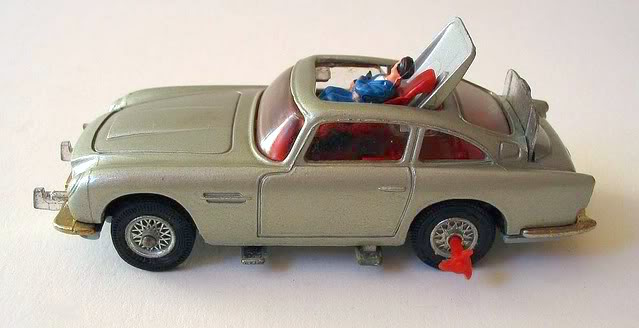
270 James Bond Aston Martin DB5, second issue from 1968 produced by Corgi Toys as a tie-in to the film "Goldfinger"

The most famous and best selling (to date) toy car of all, James Bond's Aston Martin DB5 (261) from the film Goldfinger, was issued in October 1965. Despite the fact that the casting of the new James Bond car was based heavily on the earlier Aston Martin DB4 model from 1960, it was the special features marked out this model. There were machine guns in the front wings which popped out at the touch of a button, a bulletproof shield which popped up to protect the rear screen when the exhaust pipes were pressed, and an ejector seat which fired through a roof panel which opened by the touch of another button. The model was released in time for the 1965 Christmas market and the Corgi factory found it was unable to keep up with demand, leading to coverage in the British press of stories of toy shop shelves being cleared of this new must-have toy in minutes. The model remains in production to this day in an updated form and has gone on to sell more than seven million examples in all its various versions.

The "Thrushbuster" (497) was an update of an existing Oldsmobile Super 88 casting dating back to 1961, but now with models of the stars of the television series The Man from U.N.C.L.E., agents Napoleon Solo and Illya Kuryakin, firing guns out of the windows. The two figures popped in and out of the car windows by pressing down on a model periscope protruding through the roof. Like in the case of The Saint, this owed little to realism - on the TV show the two heroes would certainly not advertise their affiliation with the logo on the bonnet.

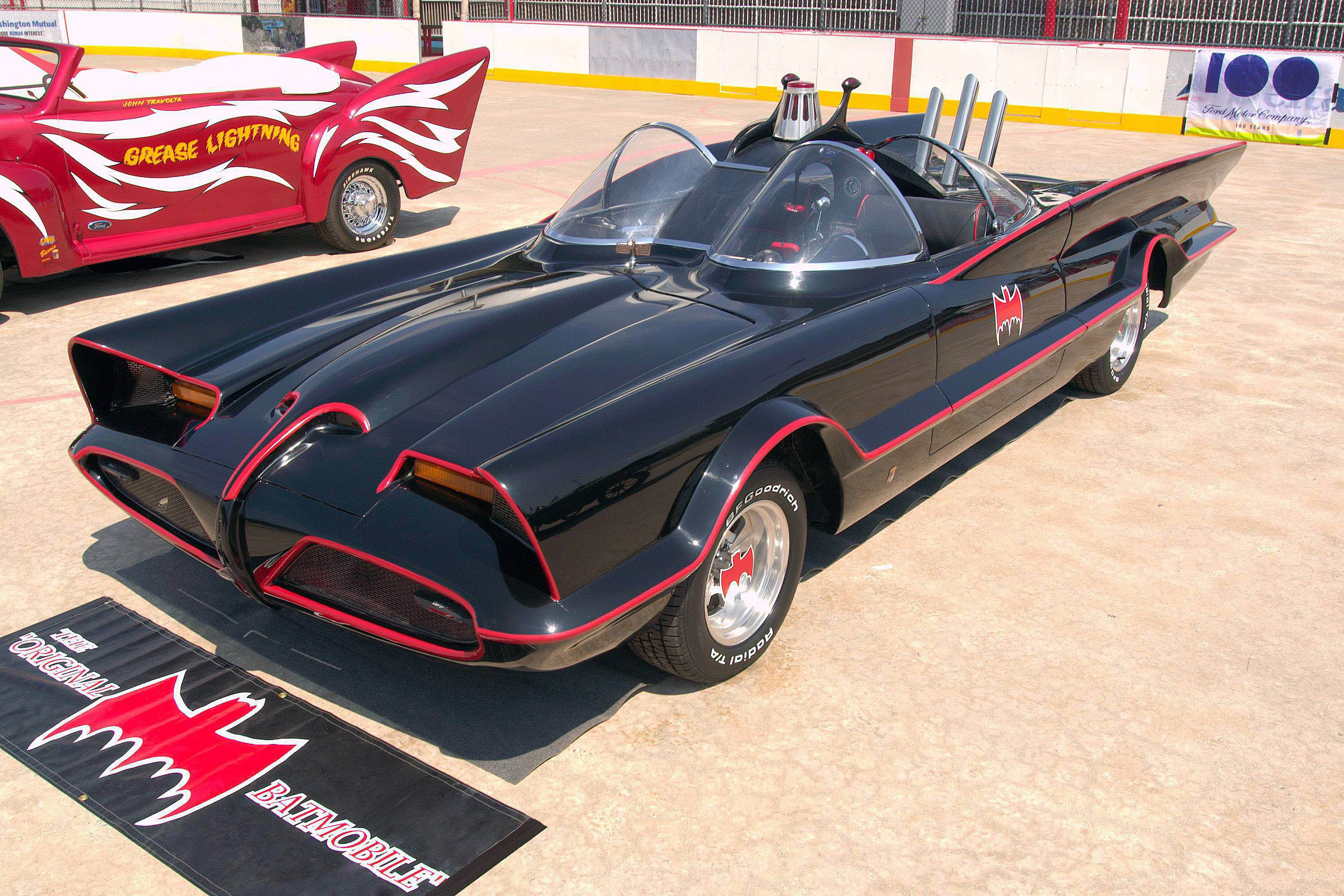
The Batmobile from the 1966 Batman TV series, one of the famous cars modeled by Corgi

The Christmas market was again dominated by a Corgi toy car; this time the Batmobile (267) released in October 1966. This was a George Barris customised 1955 Lincoln Futura concept car bought by Barris as a wreck from Ford Motor Company (reputedly for one dollar) and which featured heavily in the American television series Batman.

In June 1967 GS3 was issued consisting of The Batmobile towing a Batboat on a trailer, and another James Bond car soon followed – the Toyota 2000GT (336) issued in October 1967 from the film You Only Live Twice, which fired rockets from the boot.

The previously issued 1927 Bentley was updated for a second time to tie in with the BBC television series The World of Wooster (9004) which starred Ian Carmichael and featured figures of Bertie Wooster and his valet Jeeves at the wheel. It was the only film and television related model issued as part of the Corgi Classics range and did not sell well. The final film and television related model for 1967 was issued in November. The crime fighting car Black Beauty (268) - a George Barris customised 1965 Imperial Crown sedan, included an operational satellite launcher inside the boot and a rocket fired from behind the grill, and was featured in the American television series The Green Hornet. Although the series was not screened in the UK until years later, the model proved to be very popular and it went on to sell over two million examples.

A new casting of the James Bond Aston Martin DB5 (270) was released in February 1968, this time featuring the correct DB5 taillights (instead of the DB4 taillight clusters on the 261) and authentic silver paintwork. The original had been painted gold after the Corgi design team decided that silver painted pre-production models looked as if the metal bodies were unpainted. The new model now featured tyre slashers and revolving number plates whilst retaining all the features of the original, and early examples packaged in a short lived bubble-pack are even more valuable today than the earlier 1965 release.

277 Monkeemobile

November 1968 saw the release of the flying car Chitty Chitty Bang Bang (266) from the successful film of the same name that had been in cinemas throughout that summer. It featured plastic wings that popped out from the car's side skirts when the hand brake was pushed and detailed miniatures of the car's inventor, Caractacus Potts, Truly Scrumptious and the children Jeremy and Jemima. The Monkeemobile (277) issued in December was a model of the Dean Jeffries customised 1966 Pontiac GTO that featured in the American television series The Monkees. It included miniatures of band members Davy Jones, Mickey Dolenz, Peter Tork and Mike Nesmith sitting in the car.

Film and television related models continued to be issued in February 1969 with the Yellow Submarine (803) from the animated Beatles film of the same name. This model featured two hatches that lifted at the touch of buttons on the side of the craft to allow models of the Fab Four (John Lennon, Paul McCartney, George Harrison and Ringo Starr) to pop into view. Early examples featured a white hatch to the front and a yellow hatch to the rear in keeping with the colour scheme of the original, before both hatches were coloured red on later models. The Yellow Submarine commands high prices today among both die-cast collectors and collectors of Beatles-related memorabilia.

Corgi Toys not only produced models of automotive stars of film and television, but also models of production vehicles. A newly tooled Commer 2500 mini bus body was used for the Samuelson Mobile Camera Van (479) issued in December 1967 which included a detailed cast metal model of a Panavision film camera and plastic cameraman on a metal plinth that could be either attached to the vehicle's roof rack or to the front or rear of the van for tracking shots. The lens of the camera was represented by a tiny jewel. In September 1968 the Renault 16 Tour De France Paramount Film Unit (GS13) was released. This gift set featured a Renault 16 car with the tailgate removed and a platform extension fixed at the rear to accommodate the Panavision film camera model and cameraman. Also included was a miniature racing cycle and cyclist.

=== 1970s ===
The releases of film and television related models continued into the seventies, and included more James Bond models. In June 1970, the 1912 Rolls-Royce Silver Ghost from the Corgi Classics range was reissued, but updated with psychedelic paintwork and featuring figures of the group from the animated series The Hardy Boys, another American television show which was unknown in Britain. This time the model failed to sell, making it extremely rare today. A Ford Mustang Mach 1 (391) and the "Moon Buggy" (802) from the film Diamonds Are Forever were issued in 1972, and the Lotus Esprit (269) in 'underwater' mode from The Spy Who Loved Me in 1977.

A rocket-firing 'Stromberg' Bell JetRanger helicopter (926) from the same film was added in 1978. The Space Shuttle (649) from the Bond movie Moonraker appeared in 1979 along with a 'Drax' JetRanger helicopter (930) from the same film. A Citroën 2CV which James Bond drove in the film For Your Eyes Only was issued in 1981.

As the decade progressed some of the film and television related models became less authentic due to the lack of expensive licensing deals, and more a product of the imagination of the Corgi design team. In 1973 'Dick Dastardly's' Car (809) was issued featuring models of the characters 'Dick Dastardly' and his sidekick 'Muttley' from the children's television program Wacky Races. However, this Corgi offering was a toy-like race car from the 'Comics' range, and was a far cry from the famous "00-zero" car that 'Dick Dastardly' drove in the cartoon series.

In 1978, since the Superman movie was already popular in the UK, Corgi introduced and took advantage of recently acquired licensing deal to make Corgi Toys (model no. 260,) Superman 'Metropolis Buick' as a diecast 1:36 scale replica of a 1974–1975 Buick Regal (round headlights) style sedan. This toy car was a 1979 trademark of DC Comics, Inc on the package with a cartoon Superman. The vehicle was blue and white stripes with Police and had the two front doors that would open. There were four beacons and four sirens on the roof and a City of Metropolis Police Dept emblem on the front hood. The packaging was designed for the English, French, and German markets. This was a prime example of using a car product that was not shown in the movie but using another car product from television's Kojak series, that was produced by Corgi in 1976, a blue 74 Buick Regal police car (260B1) with one beacon and a brown 74 Buick Regal detective car (290) with one beacon. That 'Kojak' series drove Buick Century's and not the upscaled Buick Regal's that Corgi made as authentic from the show. Further confusion in the market was the same blue Buick police car as Corgi (model no. 416) "Buick Century Police-Polizei" with one beacon was made in 1977 that included a police officer figure. The car was either a "Kojak" car, then police car, and then "Superman" as proof of reusing the diecast without authenticate to television or movies. The Metropolis police car of Superman, was a 1976 Plymouth Fury and there were no Buick police cars in the movie.

In 1978 the "U.S. Racing Buggy" (167) was reissued as 'The Penguinmobile', themed around Batman's arch-enemy The Penguin, complete with an umbrella. (259). A 'Batbike' was released in 1978 featuring a figure of 'Batman' sitting astride a modified motorbike which fired two rockets, along with a series of vehicles that were issued as the result of obtaining the Marvel Comics license. They were themed around Spider-Man, Captain America, Captain Marvel and The Incredible Hulk.

These included a 'Spidervan' (436); a suitably decorated Chevrolet van, which had also been issued the previous year as a tie-in with the American television series Charlie's Angels (434), a "Daily Planet" JetRanger helicopter (929), a "Spiderbuggy" (261); a Jeep CJ-5 with a model of 'Spider-Man's' archenemy "The Green Goblin" trapped in a web styled plastic bag dangling from a crane fitted at the back of the vehicle, a "Spidercopter" (928) and a "Spiderbike" (266). A similar treatment was also given to other Marvel characters including a "Captain America" Jetmobile (263), a 'Captain Marvel' Porsche 917/10 Can-Am racer (262) and an 'Incredible Hulk' Mazda pick-up (264) which featured a caged model of the 'Hulk' on the flatbed of the truck.

A "Superman" gift set (GS21) was released featuring a 'Supermobile', the Daily Planet helicopter and a Buick Regal police car, as well as a "Spider-Man" gift set (GS23) consisting of the "Spiderbuggy", the "Spidercopter" and the "Spidervan". Many of these later film and television related releases were not models of authentic vehicles as were the earlier issues from the 1960s, but merely existing models updated to take advantage of recently acquired licensing deals.

In May 1978 a new version of the James Bond Aston Martin DB5 (271) was issued in 1/36 scale which featured the operational gimmicks of the 1965 original. This model appears in the Corgi range to the present day. In October 1978 The Saint's Jaguar XJS (320) was issued. This was a model of the latest Jaguar coupe as driven by Ian Ogilvy in the ATV television series The Return of the Saint and, again, was painted white and featured The Saint logo on the bonnet.

In 1980, the 'Buck Rogers' Starfighter (647), from the series Buck Rogers in the 25th Century, was released, including figures of 'Colonel Wilma Deering' and robot 'Twiki'. A series of models featuring characters from Jim Henson's The Muppet Show were also issued in 1980. These included "Kermit's" car (2030), "Fozzie Bear's truck" (2031), "Miss Piggy's Sports Coupe" (2032) and "Animal's Percussionmobile" (2033).

By the mid-1970s some of the most popular series shown on British television were American police dramas, and Corgi decided to model several of the vehicles featured in these shows. In 1976 the Buick Regal (290) from the series Kojak was issued, complete with figures of 'Lieutenant Kojak' and 'Detective Crocker' shooting from the rear seat, and a year later the Ford Gran Torino from Starsky & Hutch (292) was released also with figures of "David Starsky", "Ken Hutchinson", and a "suspect".

In 1980, a silver Ford Capri 3.0 S (342) was issued as a tie-in with the popular British television crime drama The Professionals featuring models of 'Bodie', 'Doyle' and 'Cowley', as well as a 1957 Ford Thunderbird (348) from the American show Vega$ with 'Dan Tanna' at the wheel. 1982 saw the release of the Magnum, P.I. Ferrari 308 GTS (298). Cost-cutting at the time dictated that no figure was included.

== Emergency vehicle models ==
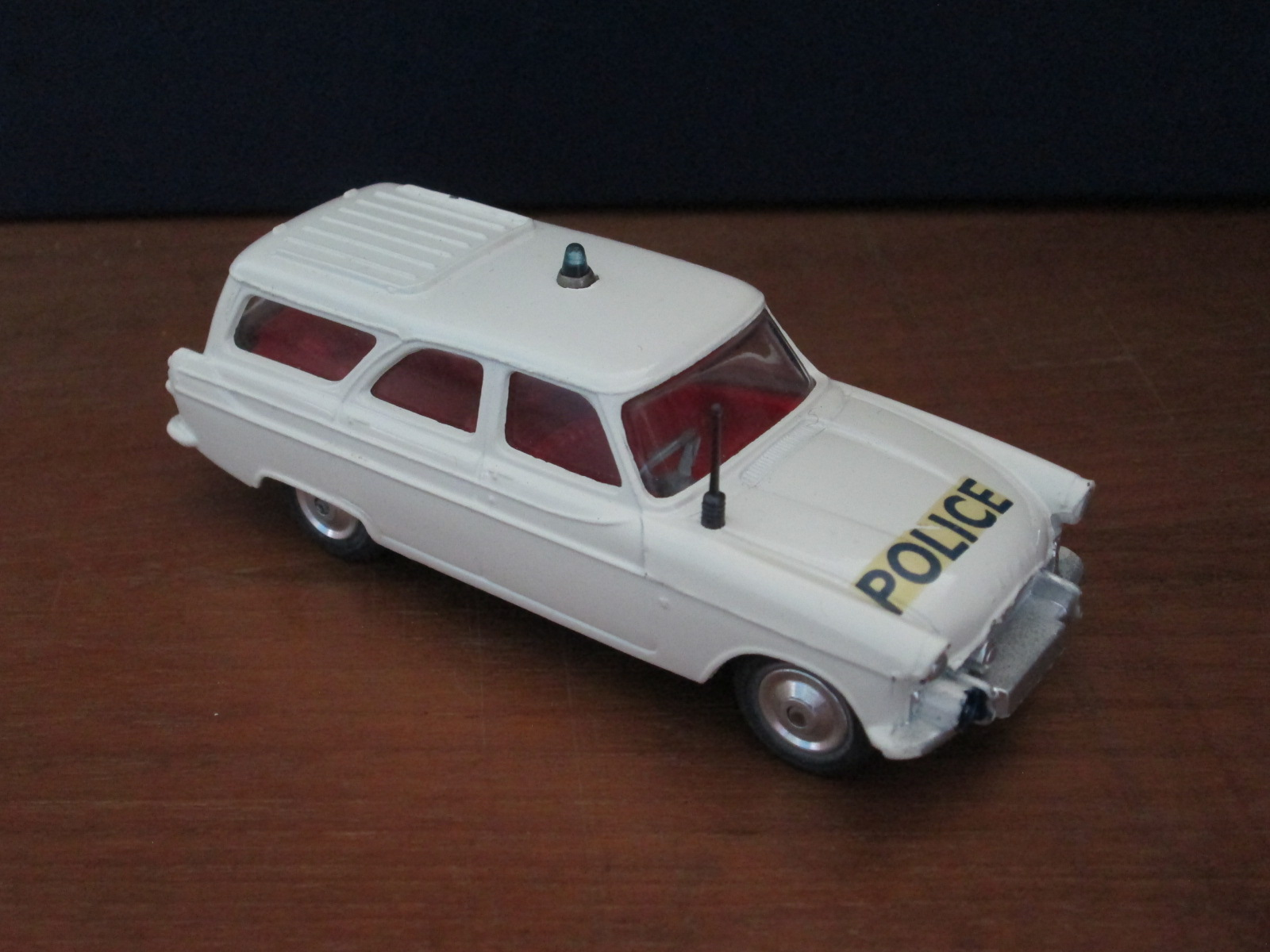
419 Ford Zephyr Motorway Patrol Car

The first emergency vehicles produced by Corgi Toys were issued as part of the launch range in July 1956, and were based on the Bedford Utilicon light commercial. It was issued in red as a 'Fire Dept' vehicle (405M) and in green as an 'Army Fire Service' vehicle (405), both with a tin plate ladder attached to the roof of the vehicle. These were followed in June 1958 by the company's first police vehicle; a Riley Pathfinder patrol car (209), finished in black and with a die cast police sign fitted to the roof complete with siren and bell. In January 1959 a Jaguar 2.4 Fire Chief car (213) was added to the range, finished in red and with a nylon aerial, crest transfers on the front doors and the same cast sign as the Pathfinder but modified to read 'Fire Chief'. The first American emergency vehicle to be produced by Corgi Toys was the Chevrolet Impala State Patrol car (223) introduced in December 1959. It was painted black and featured a nylon aerial and 'State Patrol' stickers on the vehicle's front doors. An updated version finished in black and white was issued in 1965.

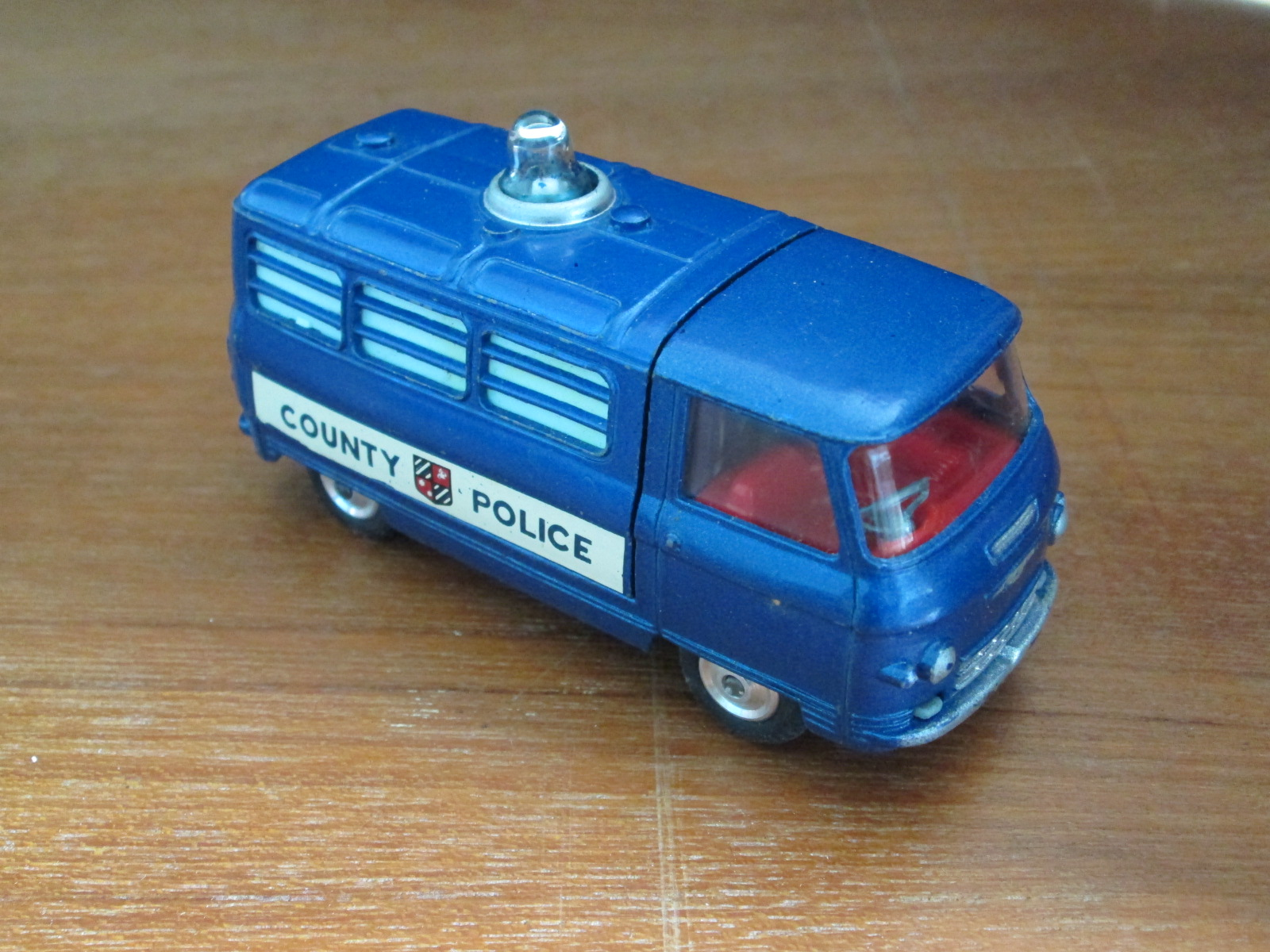
464 Commer Police Van

By 1959 the M1, the UK's first motorway, had opened to the public and this prompted the introduction of a new breed of powerful police vehicle able to carry a large payload. The Ford Zephyr Motorway Patrol Car (419) was introduced in August 1960 and was finished in white with a plastic aerial fitted to the front wing, a blue light attached to the roof, a 'Police' decal on the bonnet and a vac-formed interior detailing rescue equipment in the luggage compartment and in June 1962 the Oldsmobile Super 88 County Sheriff car (237) was added to the range. Painted black and white it featured a red light fitted to the roof and 'County Sheriff' stickers on the doors. This model became the company's first million seller. The Superior Ambulance on Cadillac Chassis (437) introduced in October 1962 was from the latest generation of models and featured red and white paintwork, a working battery operated flashing light on the roof and four trans-o-lite fibre optic lights in each corner of the roof that flashed in unison with the main bulb. This model was re-issued in blue and white in 1966. In January 1963 the existing Chevrolet Impala was introduced as a Fire Chief car (439), painted red with a light on the roof, crests decals on the doors and a 'Fire Chief' transfer on the bonnet, and was also updated with a red and white finish in 1966. In June 1963 the Commer Police Van (464) was released, painted blue with a battery operated flashing light on the roof, barred side windows and 'County Police' transfers along the sides, and this model was also updated in 1967. An ambulance version (463) painted white was issued in February 1964.

In October 1964 a Police Dog Handler Mini van (450) was introduced painted dark blue with 'Police' in white letters on the sides, a nylon aerial fitted to the front wing and came with models of the police dog handler and police Alsatian dog. The Volkswagen European Police Car (492) issued in May 1966 was finished in the green and white of the German police force, and carried 'Polizei' transfers on the doors. It featured steerable front wheels operated by the blue metal 'light' on the roof and two policemen sitting inside the vehicle, not to mention opening boot and rear engine cover. Another rear engined police car was introduced in May 1968, the Sunbeam Imp 'Panda' car (506). It was painted black and white initially but this colour scheme was soon changed to authentic 'Panda' car colours of pale blue with a white vertical centre section.

437 Superior Ambulance on Cadillac Chassis (second issue)

In June 1970 a Porsche 911 Targa 'Polizei' car (509) fitted with Whizzwheels was released. It featured a colour scheme of white and red and was fitted with a blue light on an extension next to the door and a die-cast loud hailer on the engine cover. A rare Dutch issue of the model featured dayglo orange and white paintwork and the correct 'Rijkspolitie' livery as featured on the real vehicle. The Fire Bug (395) appeared in December 1971, and was based on a GP Beach Buggy fitted with fire fighting equipment. British police vehicles were well represented with the Police 'Vigilant' Range Rover (461) released in January 1972 and the Ford Cortina Police Car (402) released in August of the same year.

Both models were finished in the contemporary white with red/blue side stripes, which would have been familiar to many motorists at the time. The Range Rover came complete with a model policeman and emergency road signs, while the Cortina was also released with 'Polizei' labels on the otherwise unchanged British car as an export model for the German-speaking countries.

The remaining years that the company was in existence saw police cars based on such subjects as a Porsche 924 (430) and a Renault 5 (428), both in the white and black livery of the French Police nationale, a Mercedes 240D (412) and the Porsche 924 (430) in white and green of the German 'Polizei', and a blue Buick Regal (416) which had previously seen service as 'Kojak's' car. There was also a Metropolitan Police Land Rover and Horse box (GS44) complete with a model Police horse and rider, which was also available in Royal Canadian Mounted Police finish (GS45). 1982 the Ford Escort was released as a blue and white Police 'Panda' car (297). Ambulances were issued based on the Range Rover 'Vigilant' (482), a Mercedes-Benz W123 'Bonna' (406) in four different liveries for Scandinavian and German-speaking countries, and a Chevrolet Superior Ambulance (405).

There appears, however, to have been a lack of fire fighting machinery released in this time, although the American LaFrance ladder truck and Simon Snorkel were still available along with the modern Chubb Pathfinder airport crash tender. Two models from this era do warrant attention. Riot Police Truck (422) released in September 1977 was a squat armoured military vehicle painted white and red with twin water cannons fitted to the rear, and perhaps reflected the turbulent times in Britain towards the end of the 1970s, and the Jaguar XJ12 Coupe which was released in December 1975 finished in the white and pale blue livery of the Coastguard (414), complete with die-cast light and twin foghorns on the roof. The model was updated as a police vehicle (429) in February 1978. In 1980 the first of the later 'Corgitronics' range was introduced: the HCB-Angus Firestreak (1001) with battery-operated siren and flashing red lights, complete with two figures in silver protective clothing.

== Commercial vehicles models ==
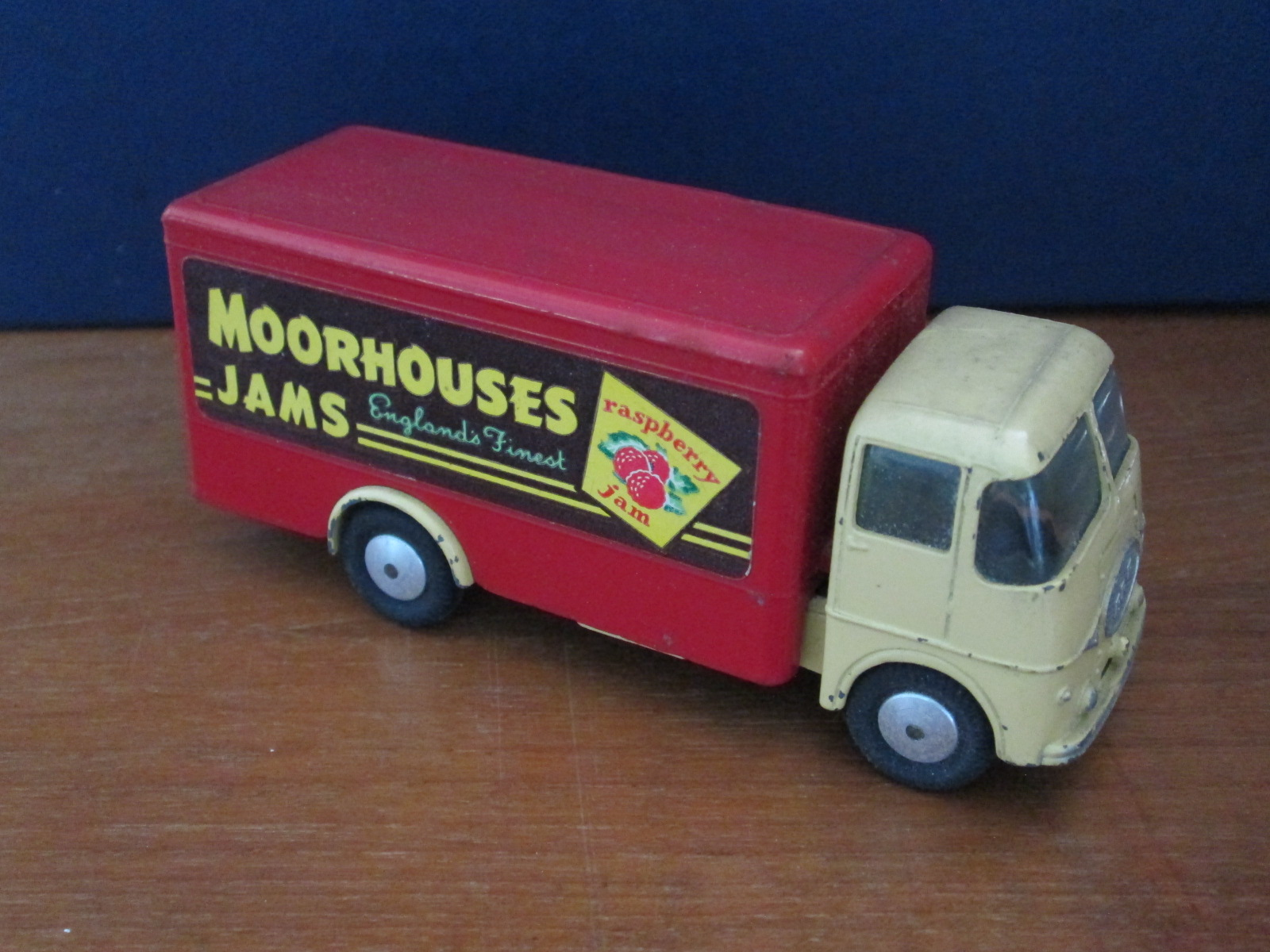
ERF van with Moorhouses advertisements

The first light commercial modelled by Corgi Toys was the Bedford CA van in Daily Express livery (403) and in 'KLG Plugs' livery (403M) which was part of the July 1956 range that launched the brand. The CA van was later released in the yellow and black livery of AA Services in May 1957 (408), in the black and silver livery of the Evening Standard (421) in June 1960 and in the yellow and blue livery of Corgi Toys (422) in October 1960. The first large commercial vehicles in the Corgi Toys range were the Commer Dropside lorry (452) and the Commer Refrigerated van finished the livery of Walls Ice Cream (453). The same large van body was used on the ERF 88G chassis to become the Moorhouses Van (459) in March 1958. Painted red and yellow it featured paper stickers on the sides advertising Moorhouses Lemon Cheese and Raspberry jam.

The Karrier Bantam Lucozade Van (411) was introduced in August 1958 and featured a sliding plastic door, yellow paintwork and adverts for Lucozade energy drink on the side. This model was updated in May 1962 to become the Dairy Produce Van (435) now painted pale blue and white and with a 'Drive Safely on Milk' advert on the side. A Volkswagen van (433) was introduced in December 1962 finished in two tone red and white along with the Volkswagen Kombi (434) which was finished in green and white paintwork. A rare promotional version of the van was produced for the Dutch department store Vroom & Dreesmann. In February 1963 the basic Volkswagen van was updated with Trans-o-lite headlamps as the Volkswagen Toblerone van (441). It was painted pale blue and finished with transfers along the sides advertising Toblerone chocolate bars. In March 1964 a Volkswagen Pick Up (432) was introduced to the range which came complete with a plastic canopy, and in December 1966 the pick up was converted to become the Volkswagen Breakdown Truck (490).

In 1963 Corgi introduced the Commer Constructor Set (GS 24), which consisted of two Commer FC van chassis units and four different rear bodies – an ambulance, milk float, panel van and pick-up. It proved very popular and remained in production until 1968. These models were also available separately as part of the normal Corgi range. The Commer Holiday Camp Special bus (508) issued in August 1968 was based on the earlier Samuelson Commer Film Unit bus, and featured bright orange and white paintwork with a decal fixed on one side on the vehicle, together with a plastic representation of luggage under cover on the roof rack.

The 'Mister Softee' Ice Cream Van (428) was introduced in March 1962 and was based on a Commer BF 1 ton van and which featured a plastic knob on the underside that allowed the ice cream salesman inside to be rotated. It also featured a sliding side window. In 1965 a Thames Wall's Ice Cream Van (447) was introduced. This was a smaller vehicle based on the Thames 5 cwt van, a commercial version of the Ford Anglia, and the bodywork featured a pointed roof design and a sliding side window. The model also came with a sheet of stickers which could be applied and also included were models of an ice cream vendor and small boy. An alternative version (474) with musical chimes operated by a handle protruding from the back of the model was introduced a year later, but without the plastic figures. A Karrier Bantam-based Mobile Butchers Shop (413) was released in October 1960 and was later updated to become a Chipperfield's Circus Booking Office (426) in January 1962 and with the addition of an opening side hatch, a detailed kitchen interior and revolving chef it was re-issued in March 1965 as Joe's Diner Mobile Canteen (471). An export version to be sold in Belgium featured 'Patates Frites' stickers on the side in place of the usual 'Joe's Diner'.

There were no further additions to the commercial vehicle range until June 1979 with the Chevrolet van, first seen the previous year, issued in the livery of Coca-Cola (437). A Ford Transit Wrecker (1140) in the livery of 'Corgi 24 Hour Service' was issued in March 1981 followed by the Ford Transit Milk float (405) in February 1982 which carried the period slogan "Milk's Gotta Lotta Bottle".

== Agricultural vehicle models ==
A variety of farming vehicles formed part of the Corgi Toys range for the majority of the company's existence under Mettoy's ownership. These models were popular with children from rural areas and today are considered highly collectable. The range was introduced in June 1959 with the Massey Ferguson 65 tractor (50) finished in the manufacturer's familiar red and white colours. An accompanying Massey Ferguson trailer (51) was introduced at the same time, and in April 1960 an operational shovel was added to the tractor as the Massey Ferguson 65 Tractor Shovel (53). The scoop could either be raised or lowered by means of one of two levers and could be tipped by means of the second lever. Both the tractor and trailer were available together as GS 7. The Massey Ferguson combine harvester (1111) was released in August 1959 as part of the Corgi Major range, which featured blades that rotated as the model was pushed along.

A new tractor was introduced in May 1961. The Fordson Power Major Tractor (56) featured steering operated by the steering wheel and was finished in Ford's traditional blue. A plough that could be attached to the tractor (57) was issued at the same time, and the two were available together as GS18. A half track version of the Fordson was available in March 1962 as the Fordson Power Major with Roadless Half Tracks (54). The first Agricultural Gift Set (GS22) was released in September 1962 and included the combine harvester, the Fordson and Massey Ferguson tractors with a fork replacing the shovel on the Massey Ferguson for this gift set only. Also included in the set were two trailers and an example of the existing Land Rover. The Fordson Power Major Tractor was issued with a new Beast Carrier Trailer, carrying a load of four plastic calves, as GS33 in March 1965 and the Working Conveyor on F.C.Jeep (64) was released in June 1965. This was an update of the Forward Control Jeep first issued in 1959 with a new casting of a working conveyor belt assembly fitted to the flat bed and accompanied by plastic model grain sacks and farmer. The first new tractor for five years was issued in July 1966.

The Massey Ferguson 165 (66) featured steering and an 'engine sound' as the model was pushed along and was finished in red and white. The conveyor belt first seen with the F.C. Jeep was updated with a trailer chassis and coupled to a second new tractor in GS47 issued in September 1966. The Ford 5000 Super Major was finished in blue and came complete with operational steering and jewelled headlights. The new Ford tractor was coupled to a Beast Carrier trailer for GS1 released in December 1966 which became the first Corgi release in the new style cellophane window box which defined the company's packaging for the future.

The Dodge Kew Fargo Livestock Transporter (484) was issued in April 1967. This was a large animal transporter based on an American Dodge truck which featured an opening bonnet and carried a cargo of plastic pigs. The Tandem Disc Harrow Plough Trailer (71) was released in July 1967 and an updated Agricultural Gift Set (GS5) in October 1967, which featured some of the more recent releases such as the Dodge Kew Fargo and the Massey Ferguson 165 tractor with scoop. In March 1970 the Massey Ferguson 165 Tractor With Saw Attachment (73) was issued featuring a clever circular saw attachment which rotated as the model was pushed along by means of a long finely coiled spring. Next followed two versions of the Ford 5000 Super Major tractor with a fully operational side trenching scoop (74) in 1970 followed by a version with a rear trenching scoop (72) in January 1971. The next new tractor model was issued in April 1973. The Massey Ferguson MF50B (50) featured a closed cab and was finished in yellow. A version with an operational shovel (54) was released in April 1974 and was featured with a trailer carrying a load of plastic 'hay' with figures sitting atop the 'hay' as the latest version of the Agricultural Gift Set (GS4) in July 1974. Another new tractor was added to the range in September 1976. The David Brown Tractor and Trailer Set (GS34) included the new tractor finished in white and with a closed cab and a tipping trailer. These models were also featured in another version of the Agricultural Gift Set (GS42) released in March 1978, along with models of a grain elevator and grain silo. At the same time the David Brown tractor was issued with a Danish JF combine harvester attachment (1112).

== Military vehicle models ==
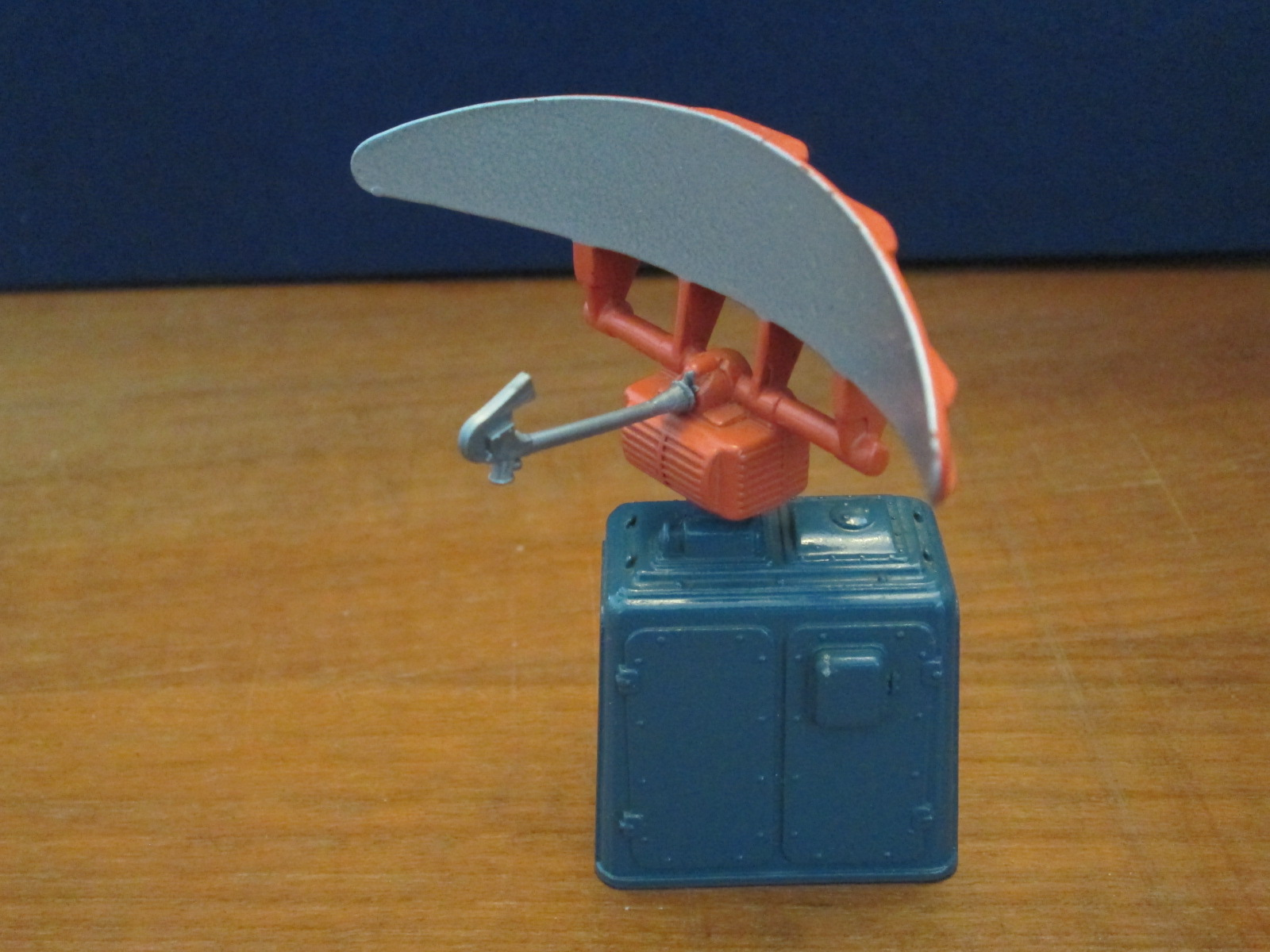
353 Decca Radar Scanner

Corgi Toys produced a sizeable range of military vehicles during the 1950s and early 1960s, and they proved very popular. The Thunderbird Guided Missile and Trailer (350) was issued in May 1958 followed by the Bloodhound Guided Missile and Launch Pad (1108) in October 1958. In June 1959 the Corporal Guided Missile on Launch Pad was issued, which was later featured coupled to a mobile transporter as Corporal Erector Vehicle and Missile (1113) released in October 1959. RAF vehicles included RAF Land Rover (351) issued in May 1958, which was included in Gift Set 4 along with the Bloodhound Guided Missile, and Standard Vanguard RAF Staff Car (352) which was issued in October 1958. The Decca Mobile Airfield Radar Van (1106) released in January 1959 featured a radar scanner which revolved remotely by means of a serrated wheel, and the Bedford Military Ambulance (414) was issued in January 1961.

In January 1965, in response to a request from the company's American agent, a range of vehicles was produced in the matt green with white star livery of the US Army. These included Commer Military Ambulance (354), Commer Military Police Van (355), Volkswagen Military Personnel Carrier (356), Land Rover Weapons Carrier (357), Oldsmobile HQ Staff Car (358), Army Field Kitchen (359), International Troop Transporter (1113), Bedford Army Fuel Tanker (1134) and Heavy Equipment Transporter (1135). All were updates of existing models from both the standard Corgi range and the Corgi Major range, and sold disappointingly leading to their withdrawal at the end of 1966. This line featured in Corgi catalogues for 1965 & 66.

There were no further military vehicles produced until the 1970s. A range of tanks was introduced in November 1973 with the German Tiger Tank Mk I (900) and the British Centurion Tank Mk III (901). It was expanded in 1974 with the releases of U.S. M60A1 Tank (902), the British Chieftain Tank (903), German King Tiger Tank (904), Russian SU-100 Tank Destroyer (905) and British Saladin Armoured Car (906). The Centurion Mk III tank was also included as part of Centurion Tank and Transporter (GS 10) along with a Mack articulated transporter truck.

The Bell AH-1G 'HueyCobra' US Army Helicopter (920) was issued in March 1975, the German Hanomag Sd.Kfz. 251 Semi-Track Rocket Launcher (907) in July 1975 and the Sikorsky Skycrane US Army Helicopter (923) in September 1975. Military Gift Set (GS17) included the Bell Helicopter, Tiger I Tank and Saladin Armoured Car. Finally, in October 1976 the French AMX-30 Recovery Tank (908) and British Quad Gun Tractor and Field Gun (909) were issued.

== Take-Off Wheels and Whizzwheels ==
302 Hillman Hunter London to Sydney Marathon Winner (Take-Off Wheels)

By the late sixties the British toy car market had changed with the arrival from the U.S. of Mattel's Hot Wheels range and their associated track sets. Sales of Corgi Toys began to fall away and matters were not helped by a disastrous fire at the Swansea factory in March 1969 which destroyed a warehouse full of models awaiting delivery. Even one of the company's cleverest innovations the Golden Jacks 'Take-Off Wheels' system which first appeared in March 1968 did little to halt the slide. The authentically detailed die-cast wheels fitted to these models were unique to each model, with the exception of the Oldsmobile Toronado and the Chevrolet Camaro which shared a wheel design, and were attached to the axle by means of the 'Golden Jacks' – die-cast golden metal stands, which when folded downwards both released the wheel and supported the model. Only seven models were produced with this feature, with more models like the Ferrari Dino, Lamborghini Miura and Pontiac Firebird planned but ultimately released with Whizzwheels instead.

The Mini Marcos was a fibreglass-bodied coupe produced by the specialist British sports car manufacturer Marcos and was built on the Austin/Morris Mini chassis and fitted with a highly tuned Mini engine. The Corgi model Mini Marcos GT850 (341), finished in metallic red, was the first in the series of Take-Off Wheels models and was introduced in March 1968. The Rover 2000 TC (275) issued a month later in April 1968 and finished in metallic green was a new casting despite Corgi having previously issued a model of the Rover 2000, and was fitted with a clear roof panel as featured on a Rover 2000 displayed on the Triplex stand at the 1965 Earls Court Motor Show, and a plastic spare wheel holder attached to the boot lid which was a popular period extra on the real car. A rare version finished in white with a red interior also exists.

344 Ferrari 206 Dino ('Red Spot' Whizzwheels)

The Oldsmobile Toronado (276) released in June 1968 was an updated version of the earlier 1967 Corgi release of the same model but re-coloured metallic red or metallic yellow, but the metallic gold coloured Chevrolet Camaro SS350 (338) issued in August 1968 was a new model of one of the latest generation 'pony' cars from America. The previously mentioned 1968 London to Sydney Marathon winning Hillman Hunter rally car (302) was issued in July 1969 and was finished in the blue and white of the original. The Rolls-Royce Silver Shadow Mulliner Park Ward Coupe (273), finished in pearlescent white over grey, was issued in March 1970. A rare version of this model was released in silver over metallic blue which was used as the colour scheme for the later Whizzwheels version. The Chevrolet Corvette Stingray (300) with detachable roof panels, released in April 1970, was the last of this short-lived line. This model was available in chromed red or green finish called 'Solarbrite' by Corgi and introduced with the Corgi Rockets range the previous year. Spare Take-Off Wheels were available separately in packs of twelve.

Low friction wheels known as 'Whizzwheels' were introduced to keep up with the competition in September 1969 with the Ferrari 206 Dino Sports (344) finished in either red and white or yellow and black. The first incarnation (known to collectors as 'Red Spots') featured rubber tyres and brass hubs with low friction red nylon centres, which though attractive and effective, were expensive to produce and were soon replaced by plastic wheels. Although giving more 'play value', Whizzwheels models are less popular with collectors today as they take away some of the character and realism of the earlier regular wheeled models fitted with rubber tyres.

== Corgi Comics ==
Corgi Toys introduced the Corgi Comics range in 1969 as a range of character based toys aimed at younger children. Noddy's Car (801) featured figures from the Enid Blyton children's novels of 'Noddy', 'Big-Ears' and 'Golly' sitting in the rumble seat. Early examples featured a model gollywog with a black painted face but after just a few months the colour was changed to grey. The model was later reissued with 'Teddy' sitting in the rumble seat, perhaps in response to the fact that gollywogs had become less acceptable by the late 1960s. It was issued again in the 1970s with just 'Noddy' at the wheel. Also released in December 1969 as part of the range was 'Popeye's Paddlewagon' (802) a half car – half boat featuring 'Popeye', 'Olive Oyl' and 'Swee'pea' from the 'Popeye' cartoon series, and 'Basil Brush's car (808) featuring a model of the glove puppet fox from the popular British children's television series The Basil Brush Show driving a colourful version of the 1911 Renault from the Corgi Classics range.

Also issued at the same time was a range of toys from Serge Danot's animated television series The Magic Roundabout. These included the 'Magic Roundabout' Carousel (H852), 'Mr Mac Henry's' trike (H859), the 'Magic Roundabout' train (H851) and 'Dougal's' car (807), a modified Citroën DS featuring models of 'Dougal' the dog, 'Dylan' the rabbit and 'Brian' the snail. Individual figures of all the characters were available, as was a 'Magic Roundabout' Playground set (H853) that included all the models in the 'Magic Roundabout' series as well as a large 'magic garden' base that featured trees and train tracks. The models in the series were all able to run on these tracks, and would move around the 'Magic Garden' at the turn of a large plastic handle. This set is now one of the most valuable of all Corgi Toys products.

== Corgi Kits, Corgi Cargoes, accessories and catalogues ==
During the early 1960s Corgi Toys issued a series of clip-together plastic kits of buildings and street furniture to complement and add further play value to their range of scale vehicles. The first release was the Batley Leofric Garage (601) with opening garage door in May 1960 followed by two street lamps (606) and AA (Automobile Association) and RAC (Royal Automobile Club) Telephone Boxes (602) in June 1960. In November 1960 Silverstone Pits (603) and Silverstone Press Box (604) were added to the range with Silverstone Club House and Timekeepers Box (605) released in March 1963 along with Circus Elephant and Cage (607). In April 1963 the Motel Chalet (611) was issued and in December 1963 a Shell/BP Service Station (608) was released, along with Shell/BP Forecourt Accessories (609) and Metropolitan Police and Public Telephone Boxes (610). A series of figures to go with Corgi Kits were released in December 1962; Racing Drivers and Mechanics (1501), Spectators (1502), Race Track Officials (1503), Press Officials (1504) and Garage Attendants (1505). The range culminated with two Gift Sets grouping together most of the releases - Shell/BP Garage Layout (GS25) and Silverstone Racing Layout (GS15) both issued in December 1963.

Designed with the intention of being used in conjunction with the Commer Platform Lorry (454), Commer Dropside Lorry (452), ERF Platform Lorry (457) and ERF Dropside Lorry (456), Corgi introduced a series of painted die-cast metal 'loads' called Corgi Cargoes. They were packaged in a clear plastic blisters attached to a card featuring the Corgi dog logo, images of Corgi lorries and the range's signature blue and yellow colour scheme. The first to be introduced in February 1960 were Plank Load (1485) and Cement Load (1488), and they were incorporated into Gift Set 11 including the ERF Dropside Lorry and Trailer in March 1960. Brick Load (1486) and Milk Churns Load (1487) followed in July 1960 and Skip and Churns (1490) in September 1960. The last in this range to be released was to be used with the Massey Ferguson 65 Tractor (50) and was a red painted cast metal platform carrying three metal milk churns which clipped to the rear of the tractor. The packaging featured an image of a tractor. Corgi Cargoes were available until 1964.

In December 1959 Corgi Toys produced packs of stickers which could be affixed to personalise Corgi models. Pack A (1460) included number plates, road fund licenses and GB plates, Pack B (1461) featured sports wheel discs and white-wall tyres, Pack C (1462) contained commercial vehicle items, Pack D (1463) included CD plates and L (learner) plates and Pack E (1464) introduced in December 1961 contained AA and RAC badges and towing plates. Today it is not uncommon to find early Corgi models with such additions still intact.

From 1956 to 1985 a catalogue was issued annually to promote the Corgi range. It was originally a small fold-out single sheet leaflet but by the late 1960s it had evolved into a 48-page colour catalogue. Corgi catalogues are notable for their illustrations and art work that are evocative of the period, and they are now collectable in their own right.

== Decline and demise ==
After the success of the range during the late 1950s and 1960s, sales remained buoyant in the 1970s, and the company made its biggest profit of £3.5 million in 1978. In an attempt to keep its products contemporary Mettoy began production of the Dragon computer which was aimed at younger users. The expense of this project proved a drain on the company's resources, and profits were hit hard. In October 1983, Corgi Toys were forced to call in the Official Receiver, just three years after the demise of Dinky Toys and one year after Lesney Products, the creators of the Matchbox brand.

== Legacy ==
The Corgi story did not end in the mid-1980s, however, as a management buy-out saw the company re-formed as Corgi Toys Limited in March 1984. This company continued to produce model vehicles, but in smaller numbers than before. The workforce grew but the costs of running the factory at the Fforestfach site had become higher. Competition was now wholly in the form of products that were being manufactured overseas leading to management moving some of the moulds to China and setting up a joint venture company with a Hong Kong company called Flying Dragon.

At the same time it took on contract work producing non-toy items. In 1989 the management sold the Corgi brand to Mattel and the factory was retained under the name of Microlink Industries Ltd. The products of the Mettoy owned company continue to be prized by collectors worldwide. In recent years the internet has allowed a far wider collector-base than in the past when swapmeets and antique markets were the only places they could be found.

== Corgi Classics Limited ==
A management buyout in 1995 saw the end of Mattel ownership and a new company was created, Corgi Classics Limited. On 1 May 2008, Corgi Classics was bought by the international models and collectables group Hornby.
