= Powertrack =

Matchbox Powertrack
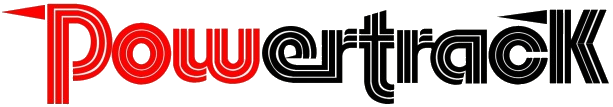
- Product type: Slot car sets
- Current owner: Mattel (1997–)
- Introduced: 1977; 49 years ago
- Related brands: Matchbox
- Previous owners: Lesney Products (1977–82)

Powertrack is the brand name for the Matchbox's slot car sets. Introduced in the late 1970s by Lesney Products Ltd, Powertrack models differed from other slot car sets because the cars could be seen in the dark as the cars had headlights. Matchbox's H0/00 (approx. 1:64) cars were smaller than Scalextric 1:32-scale cars. In the United States, the series was renamed "Speedtrack".

In the UK, Powertrack was a less expensive product than Scalextric and traded heavily on the Matchbox brand. With the smaller size, the layouts could be quite complex yet still fit in the typical 8×4 ft board size. Additionally, it did not sit out of place with H0/00 railway sets and Matchbox's own 75 die-cast range. Peter Kay commented in his autobiography The Sound of Laughter that the Race 'N' Chase set he received for Christmas in the late 1970s was the best Christmas present ever.

With the collapse of Lesney/Matchbox in the early eighties, the last official year of production appears to be 1982. Various attempts to buy the Lesney stock and continue selling the products were tried but subsequently died out. Most notably, Proops Brothers, of Tottenham Court Road, London packaged together sets in plain boxes and sold existing sets with various car combinations. Latterly, several vehicles appear from time to time rebranded as "Counterlane" but these too were short lived.

The sets came with either a 6-volt, a 12-volt or an 18-volt power unit. The 18-volt (HVT) cars are extremely quick due to the size and weight and handle well with the aid of a magnet on the underside.

No longer in production, cars and sets can be purchased via eBay with some rarer cars commanding keen prices, like the red Saab 900 Turbo and the gold, yellow livery Ford Escort. Many of the cars for sale come with poor quality tyres, leaving the cars with no grip. The lack of grip results in the cars just wheel spinning without any forward movement. However, there are replacements available, and it is still possible to buy brand new cars in sealed cartons.

== Powertrack sets ==
Powertrack sets came in different sets featuring different cars and track type.

In the UK this consisted of:

- Powertrack PT-1000 – Grand Prix (Launched 1978)

Set comprised: 1 x McLaren F1, 1 x Ferrari F1, 8 x 90 degree 9" Curve, 1 x 9" 6V Track Terminal, 1 x 9" Straight, 2 x 6" Straight. 6V 'Grandstand' Battery Box and 2 x Hand Controllers. 8 Crash Barriers, Sticker Sheet & Bridge supports.

This is Powertrack's only UK Battery powered set. The cars do not have headlights. RRP in 1979: £14.99.

- Powertrack PT-2000 – Monza (Launched 1978)

Set comprised: 1 x Porsche 911, 1 x Chevrolet Corvette, 8 x 90 degree 9" Curve, 1 x 9" 6V Track Terminal, 1 x 9" Straight, 2 x 6" Straight. 6V Mains Transformer and 2 x Hand Controllers. 8 Crash Barriers, Sticker Sheet & Bridge supports.

One of the most popular sets Powertrack produced with two of the most ubiquitous cars. RRP in 1979: £19.99.

- Powertrack PT-3000 – Super Sport (Launched 1978)

Set comprised: 1 x Jaguar XJ Series, 1 x BMW 320i, 9 x 90 degree 9" Curve, 2 x 45 degree 9" Curve, 1 x 9" 6V Track Terminal, 5 x 9" Straight, 2 x 6" Straight. 6V Mains Transformer and 2 x Hand Controllers. 12 Crash Barriers, Sticker Sheets & Bridge supports.

When released, this was a fairly expensive set that was in direct competition with Scalextric. RRP in 1979: £29–99.

- Powertrack PT-4000 – Le Mans Set (Launched 1978)

Set comprised: 1 x Porsche 936, 1 x Renault Alpine, 11 x 90 degree 9" Curve, 1 x 9" 6V Track Terminal, 2 x 45 degree 9" Curve, 11 x 9" Straight, 2 x 6" Straight. 6V Mains Transformer and 2 x Hand Controllers. 12 Crash Barriers, Sticker Sheet & Bridge supports.

At the time, the track layouts supplied eclipsed most rivals. RRP in 1979: £39–99.

- Powertrack PT-5000 – Indianapolis (28 ft) (Launched 1981)

Set comprised: 1 x Triumph TR7, 1 x BMW 320i, 9 x 90 degree 9" Curve, 1 x 9" 6V Track Terminal, 2 x 45 degree 9" Curve, 13 x 9" Straight, 2 x 6" Straight, 1 x Banked Curve (with supports). 6V Mains Transformer and 2 x Hand Controllers. 12 Crash Barriers, Sticker Sheet & Bridge supports.

This is one of only three sets launched in the UK after the original Powertrack launch of 1978. (The others were Race & Chase & PT-8000). RRP was £34.99.

- Powertrack PT-6000 – Race and Chase (American Cop Car) (Launched 1979)

Set comprised: 1 x Police Car, 1 x Corvette Stingray, 6 x 90 degree 9" Curve, 1 x 9" 6V R&C Track Terminal, 1 x Tip Bridge 9", 2 x 9" Straight, 4 x 15" Straight, 6 x Aprons, 4 x LH End Pieces, 2 x RH End Pieces. 6V Mains Transformer and 2 x Hand Controllers. 4 Crash Barriers, Sticker Sheet & Bridge supports.

This was far and away the biggest selling set in the UK; even Scalextric were slow to catch up. UK RRP in 1979: £29–99.

- Powertrack PT-6100 – Race and Chase (German Porsche Police Car) (Launched 1979)

Set known as Super Verflogungsjagd in Germany. Set comprised: 1 x Porsche Police Car, 1 x BMW 320i, 6 x 90 degree 9" Curve, 1 x 9" 6V R&C Track Terminal, 2 x Straight 9", 1 x Tip Bridge 9", 2 x Crossovers 15", 2 x 15" Straight, 6 x Aprons, 4 x LH End Pieces, 2 x RH End Pieces. 6V Mains Transformer and 2 x Hand Controllers. 4 Crash Barriers, Sticker Sheet & Bridge supports.

This is the only Powertrack/Speedtrack/Powertrack Plus set released that included 15" Crossover Tracks. This set was not launched in the UK. The box artwork is in German, but this product may have also been distributed widely across Western Europe.

- Powertrack PT-8000 – This set featured 4 lane racing (Launched 1981)

Set comprised: 1 x Porsche 911, 1 x Triumph TR7, 1 x Fiat Abarth, 1 x VW Scirocco, 16 x 90 degree 9" Curve, 16 x 45 degree Curve 12", 4 x 45 degree 9" Curve, 2 x 9" 6V 4 Lane Track Terminals, 6 x 9" Straight, 4 x 15" Straight, 4 x 6" Straight, . 6V Mains Transformer and 4 x Hand Controllers. 16 Crash Barriers, Sticker Sheet & Bridge supports.

This Powertrack set still sells well on eBay. Although expensive for a slot racing set, it undercut Scalextric's 4 lane set by nearly £40. This is the only Powertrack set worldwide that employed 12" outer curves to enable 4 lane corners.

The cars listed are those that appear on the box artwork and are generally proven to be sold with the set. However, Matchbox often replaced at least one car depending on immediate stock levels. The blue Porsche 911, dark blue Fiat Abarth, yellow Escort, red Escort and red & White Scirocco are all known to be substitute cars. The car most often replaced appears to be the Gold Scirocco.

UK RRP in 1981: £79.99. This set was also branded as Silverstone 8000. This particular set comprised 4 cars with accompanying controllers the tracks in sections would run parallel to each other.

== Powertrack Plus sets ==
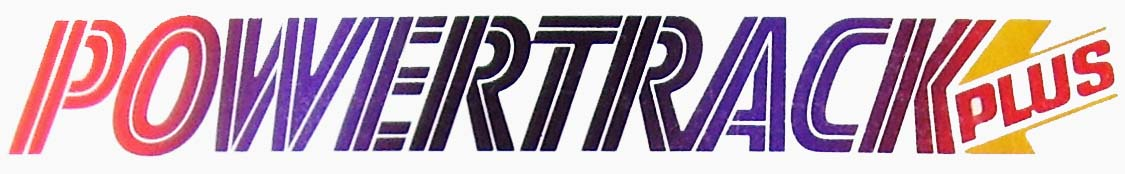
Powertrack Plus logo

In 1982, Matchbox unveiled Powertrack Plus in the UK. The cars were operated from 12V and were much faster. A magnet on the underside of the 'gearbox' increased grip to the track and the higher voltage was more tolerant of larger track layouts.

Powertrack Plus sets had upgraded transformers, hand controllers and track terminals which featured different connectors that were not compatible with the 6V systems. The 12V terminal had no facility for powering the lap counter though. All other track remained the same stock parts but were repacked with Powertrack Plus branding.

A number of new parts were created for Powertrack Plus. A Chicane 'loop the loop' and 'self supporting' banked curve featured in the PP-9000 set, while crossover tracks and a crossover 'flying jump' were included in the PP-3000.

Aside from magnets the cars also had wider pickups on the underside. They also had torquier motors and a different pinion gear and crown wheel. Essentially, every Powertrack Plus car was a revamped Powertrack car body shell with the new Chassis.

The 'Super Boss' and 'Bandag Bandit' were only ever launched in the UK in 12V form.

- Powertrack PP-2000

Set comprised: 1 x Jaguar XJ Series, 1 x BMW 320i, 6 x 90 degree 9" Curve, 1 x 9" 12V Track Terminal, 1 x 9" Straight, 2 x 15" Straight. 12V Mains Transformer and 2 x Hand Controllers. 6 Crash Barriers, Sticker Sheet & Bridge supports.

Introduction to 12V racing. RRP in 1982: £24.99.

- Powertrack PP-3000

Set comprised: 1 x Renault Elf, 1 x Porsche 936, 10 x 90 degree 9" Curve, 1 x 9" 12V Track Terminal, 1 x 6" Straight, 1 x 24" Flying Jump, 1 x 9" Crossover. 12V Mains Transformer and 2 x Hand Controllers. 8 Crash Barriers, Sticker Sheet & Bridge supports.

This was the only UK set to include the 9" Crossover track. The black-and-white markings on the Flying Jump and Crossover track were spray painted on and not stickers. RRP in 1982: £34.99.

- Powertrack PP-4000

No official details about this set have been uncovered so far. However, it is referenced in the Powertrack Plus Instruction Manual of 1982. This is likely to have been a Race & Chase set with the Police car and most likely the Silver Chevrolet Corvette (in lieu of the Corvette Stingray). The basis for this comes from the Catalogue number assigned to these cars relative to the other Powertrack Plus cars. The track layout may have been based on the US Copter Chase set, introducing both the Cross Road and Turn Off tracks to the UK. Those items were first referenced in the UK at the same time.

There are two versions of the 12V Hand controller. One has a Race & Chase style button to reverse the current direction; the other has no such button.

- Powertrack PP-6000

This is better known as Race and Chase 2.

- Powertrack PP-9000

Set comprised: 1 x Triumph TR7, 1 x Porsche 911, 8 x 90 degree 9" Curve, 1 x 9" 12V Track Terminal, 4 x Straight 9", 1 x Straight 6", 1 x 15" Loop the Loop, 4 x 45 Degree Bank Curve 9", 4 x Straight 15", 12V Mains Transformer and 2 x Hand Controllers. 8 Crash Barriers, Sticker Sheet & Bridge supports.

This is the only UK set to include the Loop. The Loop was painted red on the exterior and was also a chicane. The Banked Curve supplied with this set was a 'Self Supporting' type made of 4 x 45 degree sections. It did not need the sculptured entry and exit tracks or additional support of PT-208. RRP in 1982: £59.99.

== Speedtrack sets ==
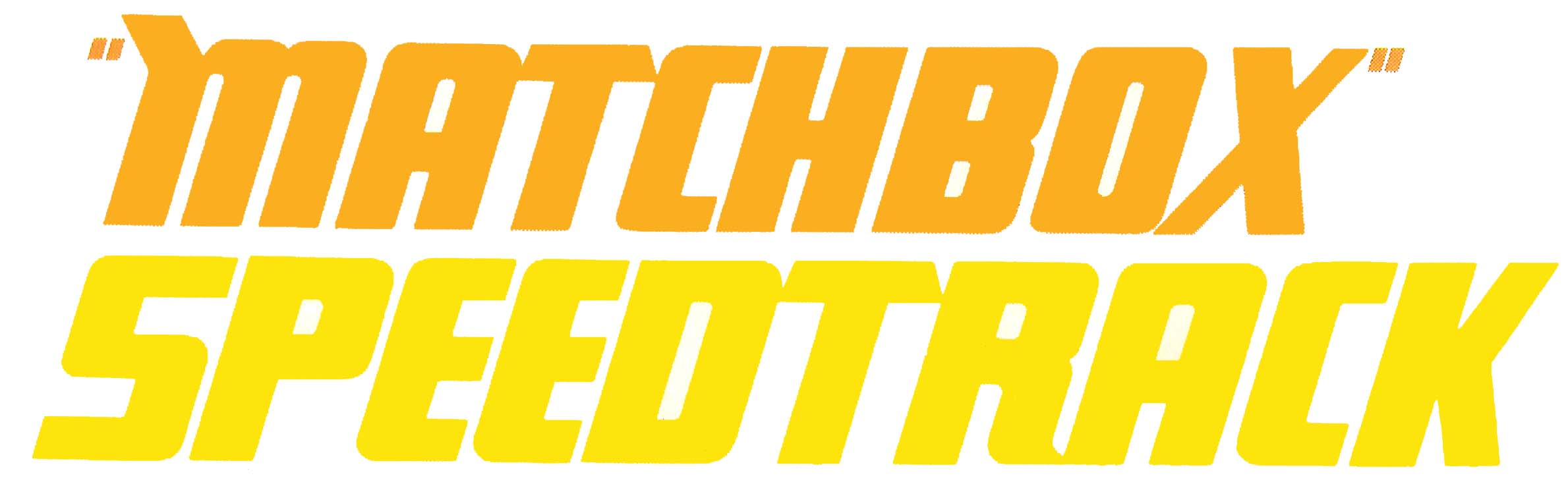
Speedtrack logo

Released in the USA at virtually the same time as Powertrack in UK, amid competition from rival H0/00 sets from AFX & Tyco. All these items were 6 Volt and did not feature the box art work of the European products. They also did not include the vac-formed plastic liner to house all the parts. Instead, parts were bagged and packaged loose in similar size cartons. Different livery and set contents were also available in the Canadian sets. Boxes were in US English and French.

In the US, the following Speedtrack sets were available from 1978:

- Grand Prix 150
- Trenton 150 This set was advertised in the Matchbox 1978 catalogue. The set featured two cars, a battery box and white hand controllers.
- Monza 200 (Set No 14-3621)
- Le Mans 300
- Riverside 500
- International 1000 This set was advertised in the Matchbox 1978 catalogue. The set featured two Pinto cars, a battery box and white hand controllers.
- Hulk Racing
- Spider-Man Race & Chase
- Copter Chase
- Race & Chase

By 1981, the name 'Speedtrack' has been dropped in favour of 'Powertrack'. The following sets had been added for the US that were similar to UK 'Powertrack Plus' sets but lacked the 12V system. Curiously, though cars were provided with slim (6v) pick ups they incorporated the magnets and gearboxes of UK 12V Cars. This 'hybrid' was denoted as a 'Positraction' car and advertised as compatible with other H0/00 slot racing systems, most notably 'AFX' & 'Tyco'.

The cars supplied with these sets were catalogued at the same time as 'Positraction' cars but have all surfaced on eBay.

- Slipstream Racing 14-36-80

This set consisted of Three Cars racing the cars in the set were Martini Porsche Pacer car, Yellow Jaguar and the Red BMW 3.0CSL Orange Jägermeister Livery.

- Tyrone Malone's Daredevil Race N Chase (13.5 Ft of Track)
- Jump Cross Championship
- Pro 8 Challenge
- World Class Racing

No preproduction photos have been unearthed on eBay. The PP-9000 was launched one year later in the UK and featured an extended version of this layout.

== Race 'N' Chase sets ==
- Race and Chase – This set featured a Bandit car and an American police car. In this set the cars could U-turn and jump using a tilting bridge.
- Race and Chase 2 – This set featured a Bandit car (Silver Corvette) and an American police car. In this set the cars could U-turn and jump using a tilting bridge. This set differed from the previous race and chase set as this was a PowerTrack Plus PP6600 was 4.2m or 14 ft in length, the track also featured a dead end section.
- Race and Chase – This set featured American Racing trucks and featured Tyrone Malone on the box. In this set the cars could U-turn and jump using a tilting bridge. This did not appear until 1981
- Copter Chase – This set incorporated both the 'Flat Intersection' and the LH & RH Switch track sections, the only set to do so worldwide. It featured the regular US cop car chasing a Black Chevy van and a Helicopter, which ran along on a conventional chassis disguised as a black plinth. This set may command a premium over every other Powertrack/Powertrack Plus & Speedtrack set.
- Spider-Man Race and Chase – This set featured 12.5 feet (3.8 m) of track a Spider-Man car and a Black Villain van. Released in 1979, it was one of only two sets to feature the Cross road section.
- Hulk's Race – This was a basic set featuring a cardboard city scape and a 6V battery box. It featured the Incredible Hulk's van and Escort vehicles.
- Spin out in space – Spin off licensed set; the robots are Voltrons and can be separately assembled to make a larger toy. Track is 12V and Blue.

== Powertrack cars ==
Car	Paintjob	Part No	Voltage	lights	Magnet	Number on Car	Featured in Sets	Image	Rarity
F1 Ferrari	Red Goodyear Modelled on a car driven by Clay Regazzoni in 1976	PT-101	6V	No	No	2	PT-1000 (UK)		Common
F1 Car	Blue and yellow Goodyear livery on spoiler			No	No		Trenton 150 Australia		Not common
F1 McLaren	Red Marlboro Modelled on a car driven by James Hunt in 1977	PT-102	6V	No	No	1	PT-1000 (UK)		Common
Porsche 911	Green with Valiant and Kremer livery: Gold and orange flashes.	PT-103	6V	Yes	No	5	PT-2000 Monza (UK) PT-8000 (UK)		common
Chevrolet Corvette	White with red and blue stripes flashes	PT-104	6V	Yes	No	4	PT-2000 Monza (UK)		common
BMW 3.0CSL	Orange Jägermeister Livery	PT-105	6V	Yes	No	54	PT-3000 (UK) & PT5000 (UK)		common
BMW 3.0CSL	Orange Top bonnet and Spoiler with yellow side panels and doors.	PT-105	6v	Yes	No	4	PT-6600 German Race and Chase		common
Jaguar XJ Series II	White with blue and red stripes (Part of British Leyland cars) (2 variants)	PT-106	6V	Yes	No	1	PT-3000 (UK)		common
Porsche 936	White with Martini written on wings and spoiler plus a red helmeted driver	PT-108	6V	Yes	No	20	PT-4000 Le Mans (UK)		common
Renault Alpine Number 5	Yellow with black stripe, number 5 WITHOUT AIRBOX	PT-107	6V	Yes	No	5	PT-4000 Le Mans (UK)		common
Renault Alpine Number 11	Yellow with black stripe, number 11	N/A	6V	Yes	No	11	PT-4000 (UK & Europe)		rare
Chevrolet Corvette Stingray	White with Yellow stripes	PT-114	6V	Yes	No	No	Race & Chase PT-6000 (UK)		very common
Police Car Chevrolet	Blue & White – Police on sides and boot/trunk	PT-113	6V	Roof Light	No	N/A	Race & Chase PT-6000 (UK)		very common
Fiat Abarth 131	Light Blue with yellow roof and yellow wheel arches	PT-112	6V	Yes	No	23	PT-8000 (UK)		common
Fiat Abarth 131	Dark Blue	PT-112	6V	Yes	No	23	Some PT-8000		common
Triumph TR7	Silver with red quarter light and bumpers Triumph logo on bonnet	PT-111	6V	Yes	No	50	PT-8000 (UK)		common
Triumph TR7	Silver with Black quarter light and bumpers	PT-111	6V	Yes	No	50	PT-5000 (UK)		not common
VW Scirocco	Gold (2 variants (Later one painted on yellow body – rarer)	PT-110	6V	Yes	No	43	PT-8000 (UK)		not very common
VW Scirocco	Red & White	PT-110	6V	Yes	No	22	Some PT-8000 (UK)		common
Ford Escort MK II	Red and black striping around side (2 different number 8 stickers)	PT-109	6V	Yes	No	8	Some PT-5000, PT-6000 & PT-8000		common
Ford Escort MKII	Yellow Ford Logo on the Spoiler and Goodyear Logo on doors	PT-109	6V	Yes	No	12	Some PT-8000		Rare
Porsche 911	Gulf blue with red stripe down middle of car (3 variants – White/Dark grey/grey wheels – Different headlights)	PT-103	6V	Yes	No	5	Some PT-8000 (UK)		common
Porsche 911	German Police Car	PT-103	6V	Yes	No	5	PT 6100 German Race n chase (Known as Race n chase 3)		Rare in the UK
Police Car Japanese	White and Black – Japanese stickers on sides and front hood	Speedracing	6V	Roof Light	No	警視庁			very Rare
Saab 900	light/dark Green with Blue and Red Lighting marks on bonnet and wings	PT-116	6V	Yes	No	3	No Set Recorded		Rare

== Powertrack Plus cars ==
Car	Paintjob	Part No	Voltage	lights	Magnet	Number on Car	Featured in Sets	Image	Rarity
Porsche 911	Red with adverts for Esso on roof and bonnet (hood) and Michelin on wheel arches, Kremer on Spoiler (2 variants – different stickers)	PP-131	18V	Yes	Yes	45	PP-9000 (UK)		very common
Triumph TR7	Green with black stripes through middle of car	PP-132	18V	Yes	Yes	7	PP-9000 (UK)		very common
Police Car Chevrolet	Dark Blue and White – Police stickers on sides and front hood	PP-133	18V	Roof Light	Yes	N/A	Probably PP-4000 but no evidence as yet.PP6000 (Race and Chase 2)		not common
Corvette	Silver with red and blue stripes along sides and through middle of car	PP-134	18V	Yes	Yes	6	Probably PP-4000 but no evidence as yet. PP6000 (Race and Chase 2)		common
BMW 320i	Cream with yellow or orange or red and black stripes (3 variants – yellow / orange / red stripes)	PP-135	18V	Yes	Yes	8	PP-2000 (UK)		common
Jaguar XJ Series II	Blue with Yellow, orange and black stripes, on wings and boot.	PP-136	18V	Yes	Yes	95	PP-2000 (UK)		not common
Renault Alpine	Yellow with ELF livery, red stripe	PP-137	18V	Yes	Yes	4	PP-3000 (UK)		very common
Porsche 936	White with BP livery red helmeted driver	PP-138	18V	Yes	Yes	71	PP-3000 (UK)		Very common
Saab 900	Red with Black and White Stripes – zig zags on front hood, roof, and trunk; Blue and Black Checker on sides; Number 138 on sides and front hood	PP-139	18V	Yes	Yes	138	No Set Recorded		Very Rare (rarest?)
VW Scirocco	Yellow with pink and brown stripes, number 3	PP-140	18V	Yes	Yes	3	No Set Recorded		very Rare
Chevrolet Corvette Stingray	Red with Yellow Stripes	PP-141	18V	Yes	Yes	2	No Set catalogued		very Rare
Fiat Abarth 131	White with Red & Blue Top & Side Striping	PP-142	18V	Yes	No	05	No Set Recorded		very Rare
Ford Escort MK II	Gold	PP-143	18V	Yes	Yes	12	No Set Recorded		very Rare
SuperBoss Truck	White with red and blue stripes alongside	PP-158 (UK)	18V	No	Yes	None	Possibly TYRONE MALONE Race & Chase		common
Bandag Bandit Truck	Black with yellow and blue stripes alongside	PP-159	18V	No	Yes	None	Possibly TYRONE MALONE Race & Chase		common
Disco Van	As per villain van but with disco markings instead		6V ?	No	Yes	None	No Set Recorded		Prototypes only
LJN Voltron Lion	Last ever Race n Chase Car Red cat like with white mouth * 1 of 5 which made a larger model arm 1984		12V				Spin out in space		Rare
LJN Voltron Lion	Yellow cat Like eyes light up * 1 of 5 which made a larger model this one been the leg 1984		12v				Spin out in space		Rare
GoBot	Fighter Jet which transforms into a robot, like a Transformers White		12V				LJN GOBOTS 'SPACE CHASE Powertrack Plus		Rare
Gobot	Black transforming cat with Crasher sticker on side wing black		12V			1	LJN GOBOTS 'SPACE CHASE Powertrack Plus		Rare

== Speedtrack cars ==
Car	Paintjob	Part No	Voltage	lights	Magnet	Number on Car	Featured in Sets	Image	Rarity
BMW 320i	Orange Jägermeister Livery (With dorsal fin on roof)	14-37-41	6V	Yes	No	54	Slipstream Racing 14-36-80		common
Funny Car AKA 'Catch Me'	White and Yellow with 'Catch-me' on side & rear of car – 2 variants	14-34-42 (US Dealer Catalogue)	6V	Yes	No	Not Numbered	Race & Chase 6000 (US)		very common
Chevrolet Corvette (Supervette)	White with red and blue stripes flashes; 4 is in US style Spangles (also white wheel version)	14-37-27	6V	Yes	No	4	Le Mans 300 (US); International 1000 (US)		not common
F1 Ferrari	Red Goodyear Modelled on a car driven by Clay Regazzoni in 1976	14-37-43	6V	No	No	2	Grand Prix 150 (US); International 1000 (US)		common
F1 Ferrari	Green wings and white body with STP sponsor logos on it			No	No	5	Possibly originated in German sets		Never seen
F1 Ferrari	Yellow with black flashes bears the sponsors name elf and Bosch			No	No	5	Possibly originated in German sets		Never seen
F1 Ferrari	Blue and white with red stripe with Shell sponsor logos on it			No	No	4	Possibly originated in German sets		Rare
F1 Ferrari	Red body and white wings with Mobil sponsor logos on it			No	No	8	Possibly originated in German sets		Rare
F1 Texaco Number 9	Red and White, Texaco on rear wing, Number 9	14-37-30	6V	No	No	9 and 8 (Australia)	No Set Recorded		not common
F1 Texaco Number 8	Red and White, McLaren on rear wing, Number 8			No	No	8 (Australian sets)	No Set Recorded		Rare
F1 Goodyear (McLaren)	Light Blue and Yellow; Goodyear on rear wing, Number 33	14-37-44	6V	No	No	33	Grand Prix 150 (US); International 1000 (US)		non-common
Elf Number 2	Dark blue and white, Elf on rear wing, Number 2	14-37-29	6V	No	No	2	No Set Recorded		not common
Williams Number 2	Cyan and white, Williams on wings and Spoiler, Number 2			No	No	2	Believed to be available in Australia only		Never seen
Ford Escort MK II	Red – no sticker on bonnet	14-37-49	6V	Yes	No	4	Hulk's Race (US)		common
Ford Escort MK II	Yellow	16-66-01	6V	Yes	No	12	No Set Recorded		rare
Porsche 936	White with Martini livery red helmeted driver PACER sticker on side	PP-138	6V	Yes	Yes	29	PP-3000 (UK)		not common
Police Helicopter	White & Red With 'Police' written on side	N/A – See text	6V	No	No	N/A	Copter Chase		Very rare
Hulk Van	Lime Green with the Hulk writing and figure on side	14-37-50 (US Dealer Catalogue)	6V	No	No	No	Hulks Race (US)		not common
Jaguar XJ Series II	Yellow with black and white stripes (With dorsal fin on roof)	16-62-01	6V	Yes	No	1	Slipstream		not common
Pinto "Sportsman"	Dark Blue with STP/Ford logos on bonnet	14-37-25 (US Dealer Catalogue)	6V	No	No	2	Appears on Box artwork of Grand Prix 150 (US)		not common
Gremlin "Sportsman"	Yellow (Similar build to Pinto above)	14-37-26 (US Dealer Catalogue)	6V	No	No	4	Appears on Box artwork of Grand Prix 150 (US)		not common
Police Car Chevrolet	Blue & White – Police on sides and boot/trunk	14-37-48	6V	Roof Light	No	N/A	Race & Chase 6000 (US); Copter Chase (US)		common
Porsche 911	Gulf blue with red stripe down middle of car	14-37-28	6V	Yes	No	5	Le Mans 300 (US); International 1000 (US); Monza 200 (US)		not common
Renault Alpine Number 5	Yellow with black stripe, number 5 WITH AIRBOX	14-37-45	6V	Yes	No	5			common
Spider-Man car	Red with a little seated Spider-Man figure	14-37-51	6V	No	No	No	Race & Chase Spider-Man set (US)		not common
Spider-Man car	Blue with a little seated Spider-Man figure	14-37-51	6V	No	No	No	Race & Chase Spider-Man set (US)		prototype only
SuperBoss Truck	White with red and blue stripes alongside	14-37-01 US	6V	No	No	None	SpeedTrack Tyrone Malone Dare Devil Diesel Race & Chase set (US)		common
Bandag Bandit Truck	Black with yellow and blue stripes alongside	16-64-01	6V	No	No	None	SpeedTrack Tyrone Malone Dare Devil Diesel Race & Chase set (US)		common
Triumph TR7	Silver with silver quarter light and bumpers No.20 on bonnet	14-37-53	6V	Yes	No	20	No Set Recorded		common
Villain Van	Black with Villain in white capital letters on side.	N/A	6V	No	No	N/A	Spider-Man Race & Chase (US) Copter Chase (US)		not common
VW Scirocco	Red & White	PT-110	6V	Yes	No	22	No Set Recorded		common

== Positraction cars ==
Car	Paintjob	Part No	Voltage	lights	Magnet	Number on Car	Featured in Sets	Image	Rarity
BMW 3.0CSL	Silver with blue & red striping and 'Powertrack' on rear wing	16-37-01	6V	Yes	Yes	21	No Set Recorded		
Jaguar XJ Series II	White & Dark Green; Mid Green British Leyland & Logo	16-38-01	6V	Yes	Yes	3	No Set Recorded		
Porsche 911	Metallic Silver with Metallic red stripe down middle of car	16-39-01	6V	Yes	Yes	5	Jump Cross Championship (US) World Class Racing (US)		
Saab 900	Red with White Arrow on Bonnet and White Rear; Number 8 on sides and roof.	16-36-01	6V	Yes	No	8	No Set Recorded		Rare
VW Scirocco	White with Red & Blue Diagonal Striping	16-40-01	6V	Yes	Yes	66	World Class Racing (US), Pro-8 Challenge (US), Jump Cross Championship (US)		

== Track Pieces (Powertrack) ==
Part number	Description	Sets used on	Length	Country of origin
PT-203 or 14-52-22	Straight Terminal point (for 2 cars)	Powertrack, Circuit Electrique, TurboRennen	9" or 22.9 cm	
14-37-73	Straight Terminal point (for 2 cars)	Powertrack, Circuit Electrique, TurboRennen, Speedtrack	9" or 22.9 cm	USA
PT-255	Straight Terminal point R & C (for 2 cars)	Powertrack, Circuit Electrique, TurboRennen	9" or 22.9 cm	
14-3722	Straight Terminal point (for 2 cars)	Power Track, Circuit Electrique, TurboRennen	6"	United States
14-3720	Straight Terminal point (for 2 cars)	Power Track, Circuit Electrique, TurboRennen	9" or 22.9 cm	USA
PT-206 & 14-52-45	Straight	Power Track, Circuit Electrique, TurboRennen	15"	
14-37-72	Straight (2 Pack)	Power Track, Circuit Electrique, TurboRennen	15"	
PT 202-02	Curve 90 Degree	Powertrack, Circuit Electrique, TurboRennen	9" or 22.9 cm	Hong Kong
PT-208	Curve Banked	Power Track, Circuit Electrique, TurboRennen	9"	
PT-205 & 14-37-21	Corner 45 Degree	Power Track, Circuit Electrique, TurboRennen	9"	Hong Kong
PT-204 & 14-37-22	Straight 6"	Powertrack, Circuit Electrique, TurboRennen	6"	Hong Kong
PT 256	Bridge Supports	Powertrack, Circuit Electrique, TurboRennen	N/A	Hong Kong
PT 211	Apron & End pieces	Powertrack, Circuit Electrique, TurboRennen	9"	Hong Kong
PT 302–309	Mains Transformer 6V	Powertrack, Circuit Electrique, TurboRennen		Hong Kong
PT 251/2	Throttle (R&C: Red/Blue)	Powertrack, Circuit Electrique, TurboRennen	6"	Hong Kong
PT 210; 14-52-63	Tip Bridge 9" (Shell Advertising on side)	Powertrack, Circuit Electrique, TurboRennen	9"	Hong Kong
14-37-78	Crossroad	Power Track, Circuit Electrique, TurboRennen	15"	
14-37-79	Elevation supports Pack consisting of 8 beams and 32 supports	Power Track, Circuit Electrique, TurboRennen		Hong Kong
PT-214	8 x 12" 45 degree curve	Power Track, Circuit Electrique, TurboRennen	8"	Hong Kong
PT-201	2 X 9" Straight	Power Track, Circuit Electrique, TurboRennen	9" (22.9 cm)	Hong Kong

== Track (Powertrack Plus) ==
Part number	Description	Sets used on	Length	Country of origin
PP-201	Straight x 2	All	9"	Hong Kong
PP-204	Straight x 2	All	6"	Hong Kong
PP-206	Straight x 2	All	15"	Hong Kong
PP-205	45 Degree Curve	No Powertrack Plus Set Recorded	6"	Hong Kong
PP-208	Curve Banked	PP-9000	9"	Hong Kong
PP-202	Corner 90 Degree with Barrier x 2	All	9"	Hong Kong
PP-212	Crossroad	No Powertrack Plus Set Recorded	15"	Hong Kong
PP-214	45 Degree Curve x 2	No Powertrack Plus Set Recorded	9"	Hong Kong
PP-213	Cross Over Track x 2	PP-3000	15"	Hong Kong
PP-216	RH & LH Turn-offs	No Powertrack Plus Set Recorded	15"	Hong Kong
PP-217	Cross Over 'Flying Jump'	PP-3000	24"	Hong Kong
PP-210 & 14-37-76	Tip Bridge	PP-4000(?)	9"	Hong Kong
PP-218	Loop the Loop	PP-9000	15"	Hong Kong
PP-211	Apron & Ends	PP-4000(?)	For PP-202	Hong Kong
PP-207	Bridge Supports	All	N/A	Hong Kong
PP-228	Sticker Set	N/A	N/A	Hong Kong
PP-229	Service Pack	N/A	N/A	Hong Kong
	R / H SWITCH & 1 x L / H SWITCH	N/A	N/A	Hong Kong

== Powertrack crash barrier advertising ==
Along the side of the track crash barriers were fitted which featured the following company's logos. Most sets featured grey crash barriers however the Indianapolis 500 set featured red ones. Gobots sets featured Yellow Crash Barriers adverts on these barriers were self-promoting PowerPak (instead of Powertrack) Racing and Gobots Space Chase.

- Bosch
- Champion
- Ferodo
- Goodyear
- Castrol GTX
- Jägermeister
- Martini
- Shell
- Texaco
- Porsche
- Philips

== PowerTrack accessories and spares ==
Accessory	Part Number	Image	Set
Lapcounter	PT-221		
Controller Light Blue	14-1023		
Service Kit			
Grandstand Battery Box			
Battery Eliminator Power Pack (US)	#14-1024		
Race and Chase Controller (Red)	14-37-75		Race and Chase
Race and Chase Controller (Black)	10-39-80		Race and Chase
Spare Tyre Kit	14-30-47		
Spare Slot Pin Kit	14-30-49		
Bridge Supports	14-37-39		PowerTrack & Race and Chase
Track Pickups and springs	14-30-46		
Front axle and wheels	14-30-48		
Chassis	14-30-44		
Tilt Bridge	14-52-63		Race and Chase

== Power supply specification Powertrack ==
- Part Number 22894 D.C Output 6V 0.7 amps 4.2VA (United Kingdom) – Black

Uk Power packs had no earthing cable and just your standard blue (neutral) and brown (live) wires which could be wired to a standard British 3 pronged plug. on the output side the wire that connected to the track was the same type (ends) that the controllers had.

- Part Number PT332 D.C Output 6V 1 amps 6.0VA(United Kingdom) – Red/Orange (Possibly for use on four laned Tracks)
- LC302 D.C Output 10V 0.35 amps 7VA (United Kingdom) - Grey (used with lanechanger sets)

These power supplies had an extra output wire as the tracks had three rails.

== Track supports Powertrack ==
Track supports where included with the sets to allow elevated sections of track thus also enabling cars to pass underneath. These connectors could be place together to make the track as high or low as you so desired, typically these pieces where utilised to make a figure eight circuit.

- Colours available − grey, yellow

== Lane Changer ==
Lanechanger differed from the SpeedTrack or Powertrack sets as the cars did not have a pin holding them to the track. The track itself consisted of three rails which enabled the cars to slide from lane to lane at a press of a button located on the hand controller. Cars could easily co-exist on the same rails, this also allowed chicanes to be placed on the circuit as this would not cause the cars to crash. The cars had two different chassis types either A or B where as the B type chassis visibly has a different pickup.

=== Lanechanger Sets ===
- Lane Changer LC 1000 – This set featured cars which could switch lanes at a press of a button on the Controller. (13 ft)
- Lane Changer LC 2000 – 25 ft (7.6 m) of track and 3 Chicanes
- Lane Changer LC 4000 – RPS or Speedtrack RPS Turbo 4000 – Us version of Lanechanger featuring black hand controllers with Turbo written on them. The RPS in Lanechanger RPS stands for Rack and Pinion Steering.

=== Lanechanger Cars ===
Car	Paintjob	Part No	Number on Car	Image	Country Sold	Lights	Rarity
BMW M1	Red bonnet White doors and roof Blue tail	LC-106	90		France	Yes	rare
Ford Capri	Red With white stripes on roof and Goodyear logo on spoiler	LC-105	66		France, UK, USA	Yes	rare
Martini Porsche	White with red and blue stripes along middle of car	LC-104	2		USA	No	common
Porsche 935	Blue Bonnet yellow rear with porsche on spoiler	LC-104	15				rare
Porsche 935	Half of car is silver (left) other half red (right) chequered spoiler		10			Yes	rare
Kremer Porsche 935	Green with Orange roof	LC-101	3 or 2		UK	Yes	common
Monza GT	Yellow with red diagonal stripe from front wheel arch to rear spoiler		7		USA	Yes	Rare
Monza GT	Blue with yellow wings (yellow stripe down center of bonnet)	LC-102	11		USA	No	rare
Monza GT	White with red roof, red stripes down wings	LC-103	8		USA	Yes	
Monza GT	White with red roof, red stripes down wings, painted green headlights	LC-103	1		UK	No	common
Monza	Red with white wings and chequered flag on spoiler		4		USA	Yes	
Super Monza	Yellow with black chevrons down wings	LC-102	12				
Porsche	Red with black chequered flag on spoiler		Not numbered			Molding to accommodate lights	rare

=== Lane Changer Track and Track accessories ===
Part number	Description	Sets used on	Length
LC-202	90 Degree curve	Lanechanger	
LC-206	Straight	Lanechanger	
LC-209	Chicane	Lanechanger	
10-39-03	9" 90 Degree Curve (2 Pack)	Lanechanger	9"
LC-3333	Power Supply 12V Grey	Lanechanger	n/a
LC-231	Controller Grey or Orange	Lanechanger	n/a
Lc-232	Controller Black	Lanechanger	n/a

== Lanechanger Trackside Advertising ==
Like Powertrack before the Lane changer sets also featured Crash Barrier Advertising and also unlike PowerTrack Advertising on the chicanes, the advertising reflected the time.

- Dunlop Tyres
- Shell
- Phillips
- Porsche
- Jagermister
- Federo
- Castrol GTX
- Goodyear
- Texaco
- Bosch

== Powertrack Worldwide ==
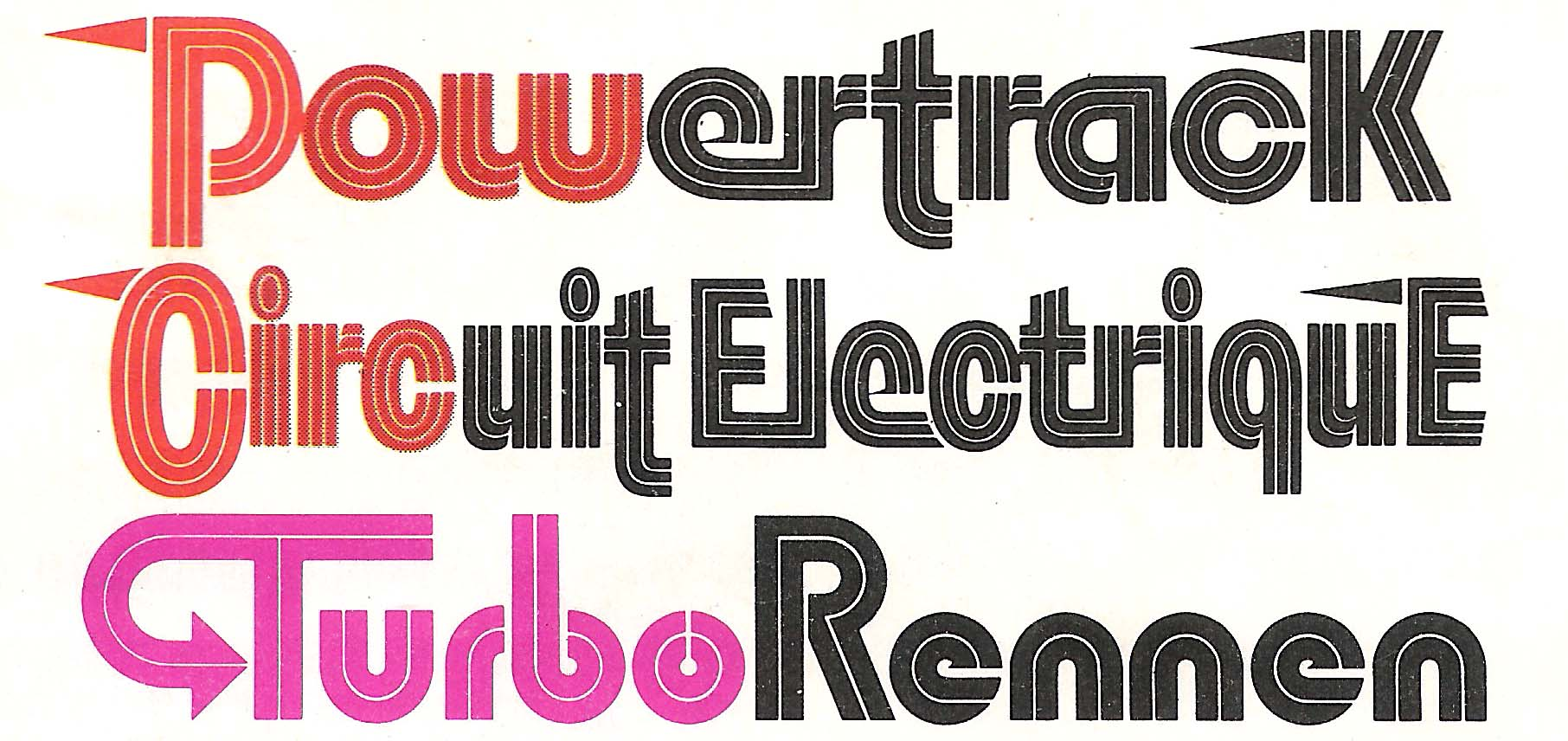
Different names and logos of the Powertrack brand worldwide

Powertrack is branded under different names depending on country

- Italy – Turbo Sprint
- Hong Kong – Laneshifter
- USA – Speedtrack
- France – Circuit Electrique
- Germany – TurboRennen

== Trivia ==
The instructions supplied with the sets featured cartoon like cars examples.

- To represent a car overheating – A cartoon car sweating with its tongue hanging out.

== The Porsche Turbo ==
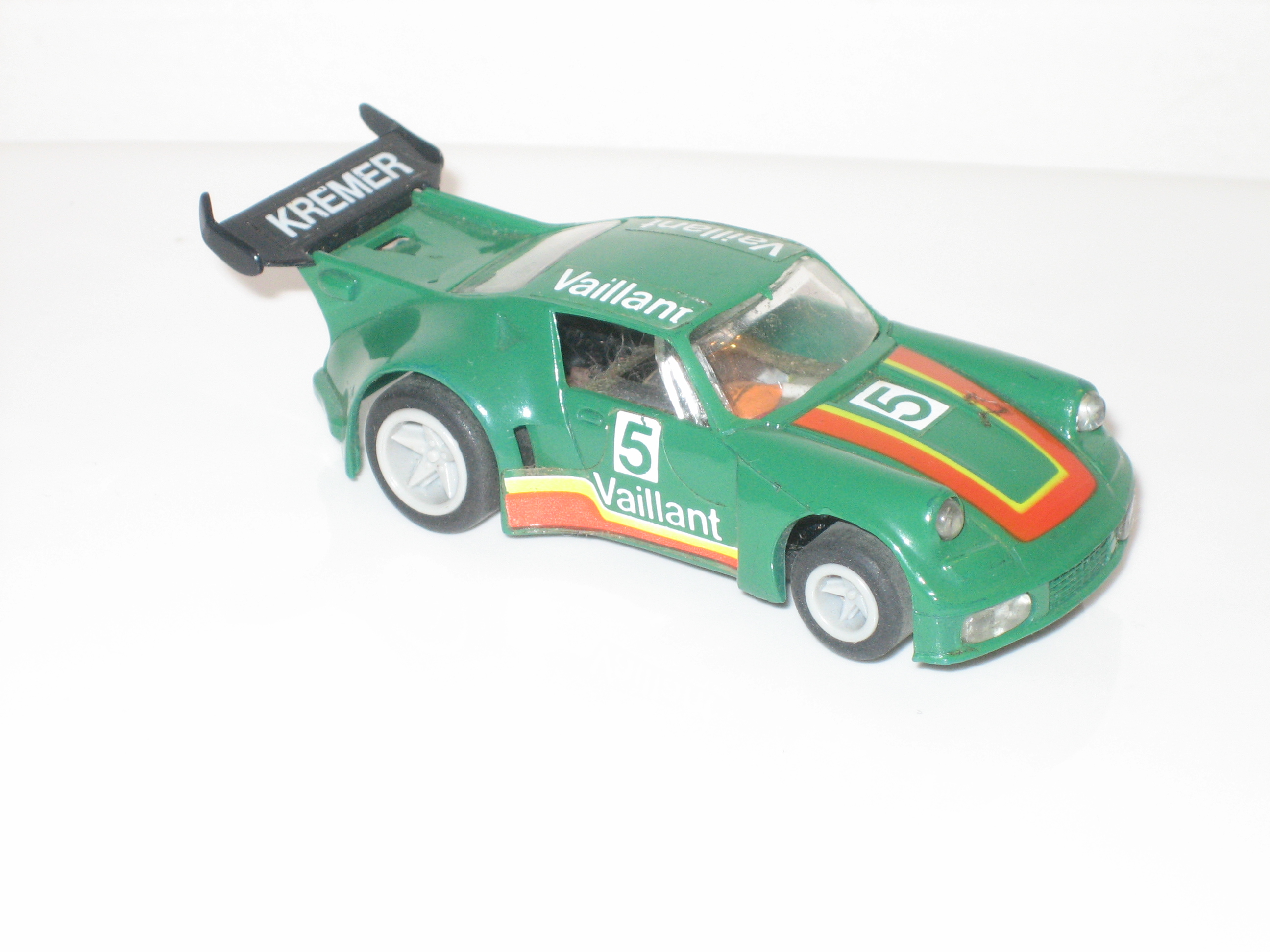
Porsche Turbo car

Matchbox produced a Porsche 911 Turbo for their Powertrack and Speedtrack range at launch. The 911 was (and still is) considered de rigueur for slot racing as it is ubiquitous on racing circuits all over the world.

The first Turbo (Mark 1, below) was loosely modelled on the Group 4 930 type. It had wide front wheel arches and 'whale tail' rear wing. In the UK, this was the Green Kremer Powertrack car which was identical to the US light blue/orange car.

However, despite its popularity it was an inferior moulding and short on 'wow' factor. Curiously, it is the only Powertrack/Speedtrack car to have a front axle with spacer bushes on it. This suggests it was a very early Matchbox prototype that could just about pass for production.

When Lanechanger was launched in 1979 Matchbox produced the 935 'Flat nosed' Porsche and this bodyshell was superior in every way to the Powertrack/Speedtrack offering. Matchbox increased its desirability by incorporating the Martini striping of the Works cars from the mid-Seventies.

Intriguingly, when Powertrack Plus was launched in the UK in 1982, the instruction manual included a range of cars 'facelifted' for the new 12V system. Among these was a 'Mark 1' Porsche bodyshell repainted in red to include the new Kremer/Esso Decals.

However, what Matchbox actually produced was a brand new Porsche bodyshell (Mark 2). This was a different mould to the Mark 1 and altogether a superior product.

== Pre-production cars ==
Between 1976 and 1977, Matchbox developed vehicles for the sets. The company invested in new tooling for the cars, however the early models featured limited detailing. The 1978 Speedtrack catalogue documented the state of production as of late 1977.

=== Powertrack pre-production cars ===
The Renault Alpine and Porsche 936 (shown in opposite places to the text) are fairly advanced and if anything represent a more detailed facsimile of the 'production' cars.

The Porsche Turbo and the Corvette (dubbed 'Supervette') look like pre-production cars, but apart from wheels and liveries remained unchanged throughout their life (See Porsche Turbo, above). The VW Scirocco included at this stage did not surface in the UK until 1979/80.

The police vehicle is a prototype that reflects the design characteristics of the "Street" series produced by Tyco and Aurora. The model exhibits significant inconsistencies in scale and detail, suggesting it was in the early stages of development and far from production-ready. Given that the Race 'n' Chase set was launched in 1978 and subsequently achieved high commercial success in both the United Kingdom and the United States, the production of such a prototype would have represented a notable technical undertaking during that period.

By 1979, Matchbox was actively developing additional vehicles for the Race 'n' Chase line, as evidenced by a promotional brochure released in the United Kingdom. Several featured models exhibited distinct variations from their final production states. The red Ford Escort, for instance, bore the number 1 rather than the later production number 8, and featured an updated mold that lacked windows. Similarly, the Triumph TR7 was presented in a metallic army green—a non-production color—and also lacked window components. The Fiat 126, numbered 22, appeared in a metallic blue finish with black detailing. Notable improvements were also evident in the police vehicle, which had undergone significant redevelopment since its initial prototype stage. The Chevrolet Corvette was featured in Stingray livery, though it utilized the existing Corvette mold rather than a new Stingray casting. Among the selection, only the Volkswagen model remained unchanged from its previous iteration.

=== Lanechanger preproduction artwork ===
In 1978, Matchbox launched the RPS Lanechanger system. The Cars initially available were either the Chevrolet Monza or the Porsche Turbo. The Chevys had Chassis type 'A' and the Porsches had Chassis type B. The difference was in the pick up shoes on the underside of the cars. A cars had 2 parallel pick ups, B cars had an 'Offset' pick up shoe. This was to enable the cars to be powered independently while using the same lane. It was not possible to use 2 Type A cars or 2 type B cars at the same time.

Matchbox eventually decided to include both pick up shoe types with each car. This was probably to extend its limited range of bodies for Lanechanger.

The artwork above shows renderings for the 1978 Speedtrack catalogue. The actual cars were not ready for photography so these renderings sufficed.

In the track photographs (see the Lanechanger section above), the Porsche appears as a white Powertrack body with a red LC Porsche wing. The body does not appear to be fitted to a chassis. The Monza was later replaced with a silver Powertrack Corvette, which also does not appear to use a Lanechanger chassis.

== Crossroads – Intersection ==
The 'Crossroad' section of Powertrack only featured in the Copter chase set for the US market. The track did appear in sufficient quantity in the UK around 1980/1 and appears to be a regular on eBay. The track piece was quite large, consisting effectively of 2 15" track pieces adjacent to each other. Any layout requiring this piece needed a fair amount of room to provide sufficient turn in/run out.

The Powertrack Plus manual of 1981/2 details a Cross road track PP-212 (Above). This piece is a standard 9" section of straight with two female joints halfway along the straight. This piece would have enabled the expansion of small sets with limited space and expanded track layout options. However, it did not arrive on the market. As with the Porsche Turbo, Matchbox seemed keen to redesign existing items rather than design new ones.

The PP-3000 set of 1981 features a 9" section of cross over track, while all other sets and accessories in the UK & US feature 15" cross overs.

== Counterlane ==
Products under the "Conterlane" brand

Matchbox sold some of its excess stock to a company called Dapol, which rebranded it as "Counterlane Dapol" reboxed cars and sold them on. When Dapol decided to stop selling Counterlane, the remaining stock was sold to Proops who were electrical retailers in London, items were reboxed again in plain white boxes. Below is pictured such a rebranded car, in this instance an unknown Lanechanger car. Sets were also reboxed and sold by counterlane which today are extremely rare.

== Lane Shifter ==
In around 1984, lane change was re-released by Road Champs, as lane shifter. This had some minor improvements.

== LJN (Last Race 'N' Chase release) ==
The 'Powertrack plus' was released in the USA as GoBots (Space Chase, by LJN) and Voltron (Spinout in Space, by LJN). The track is the same, except it is blue. The Chassises are the same, except they are marked as PowerPak instead of Powertrack!.

== Hybrid Cars ==
It is possible to place the Matchbox Powertrack Chassis into other shells and in some instances making the cars physically bigger. The table below pictures such examples, however the origin of such cars is yet to be established.

Body	Body Origin	Colour	Compatible with	Head Lights	Image
Ferrari F40	Possible Scalextric	Light Blue	PowerTrack	Yes	

== Hobbyist Models ==
Keen hobbyists have produced alternate shells for existing chassis examples are listed below, the makers of such shells are as yet unknown.

Body	Hobbyist	Colour	Image
New York Taxi	Undisclosed	Yellow	
Red Bull Blue Corvette	Undisclosed	Blue	
Craig's 442 oldsmobile	Undisclosed	Orange	
AC Shelby Cobra (Resin shell only)	Undisclosed	Red Blue Green	

== See also ==
- Slot car racing
