= Motor City Patrol =

1992 video game

- Developer(s): Source Research & Development
- Publisher(s): Matchbox International
- Designer(s): Ross Harris
- Programmer(s): Ian Richards
- Artist(s): Ross Harris, John Cassels
- Composer(s): Chris Gill, Link Tomlin
- Platform(s): Nintendo Entertainment System
- Release: NA: January 1992
- Genre(s): Mission-based driving
- Mode(s): Single-player

Motor City Patrol is a top-down driving game released in 1992 for the Nintendo Entertainment System. It was developed by British studio Source Research & Development and published by Matchbox International Ltd.

Motor City Patrol was shown at the Summer Consumer Electronics Show in 1990 and 1991. The game was released in January 1992, and was Matchbox's first video game.

Motor City Patrol was one in a line of video games that tied into the Matchbox brand of die-cast model vehicles, like police cars, ambulances, fire trucks, and earth-moving construction machines.

== Gameplay ==
Screenshot of a car chase

The player controls an officer of the law whose job it is to patrol one of five precincts for a week at a time. As the player gets further and further into the week, a larger area is permitted to be patrolled, in addition to a longer shift (time limit) to accomplish each of the mission goals.

The player must drive around looking for speeders, robbers, and public enemies, and not hurt innocent civilians. When a criminal (speeder, robber, or public enemy) appears on the precinct map, the player must either pull over or shoot the offender's vehicle. The game ends when the player fails a mission, receives five or more warnings, shoots a civilian, or totals their vehicle.

After going through all five precincts (at seven days apiece), the player starts over again in precinct 1, on day 1, with all of their points, merits, warnings, and car upgrades intact. The game cycles indefinitely until the player loses.

== Reception ==
Skyler Miller of AllGame gave Motor City Patrol two stars out of a possible five, calling it an "interesting but ultimately disappointing game". Miller praised the game's "sharp, detailed rendition" of city streets, but wrote that the execution of the game's "promising" concept "is derailed by repetitive objectives that never change, a difficult-to-control car and the necessity of constantly having to switch to a map screen to see the location of buildings and criminals."
