= Leslie Smith =

Les or Leslie Smith may refer to:

== Footballers ==
- Les Smith (footballer, born 1918) (1918–1995), footballer for England, Aston Villa and Brentford
- Les Smith (footballer, born 1920) (1920–2001), footballer for Oldham Athletic and Huddersfield Town
- Les Smith (footballer, born 1921) (1921–1993), English footballer for Mansfield Town
- Les Smith (footballer, born 1927) (1927–2008), footballer for Wolverhampton Wanderers and Aston Villa
- Les Smith (Australian footballer) (1900–1975), Australian rules footballer for Geelong
- Les Smith (footballer, born 1892) (1892–1968), Australian rules footballer for Melbourne
- Les Smith (footballer, born 1934), Australian rules footballer for Collingwood

== Others ==
- Les Smith (born 1967), British keyboard player
- Les Smith (pole vaulter) (born 1947), winner of the 1969 pole vault at the NCAA Division I Indoor Track and Field Championships
- Leslie Smith (businessman) (1918–2005), British entrepreneur and co-founder of Lesney Products and the Matchbox cars
- Leslie Smith (fighter) (born 1982), American mixed martial arts fighter
- Leslie Smith (shooting victim) (died 2000), Belizean police suspect
- Leslie Smith (singer) (born 1949), American singer
- Leslie Smith (skier) (born 1958), American former alpine skier
- Leslie Smith III (born 1985), African American visual artist
- Leslie C. Smith, American military officer and Inspector General of the U.S. Army
- Leslie M. Smith (born 1961), American mathematician, mechanical engineer, and engineering physicist

== See also ==
- Lesley Smith (disambiguation)
- Leslee Smith, basketball player
