= May 26 =

May 26 this year in various calendars
- Tuesday, 26 May 2026
Akan	Kurubene
Armenian	10 Margach 1475
Aztec	Ochpaniztli 16, 7 Cuetzpalin
Babylonian	8 Ayaru, 2337 SE
Balinese pawukon	Menga, Pasah, Menala, Pon, Paniron, Anggara of Warigadian, Yama, Nohan, Pandita
Bengali	12 Joishtho, BS 1433
Chinese	Yang Metal Rat・Wings Mansion; Fire Horse Year, Month 4, Day 10 (Xiaoman, 10 days until Mangzhong)
Common Era	26 May 2026 CE
Coptic	18 Pashons, AM 1742
Egyptian	10 Phaophi, 2775 NE
Ethiopian	18 Genbot, 2018 Amätä Məhrät
French Republican	Décade I, Septidi de Prairial de l'Année 234 de la République
Gregorian	26 May, AD 2026
Hebrew	10 Sivan, AM 5786
Hindu	Uttaraphalgunī・Vajra; Solar: 12 Jyeṣṭha, 1948 SE; Lunisolar: Daśamī, Śukla pakṣa of Adhika Jyeṣṭha, 2083 VE; Rāudra・5127 KY・1,872,721
Icelandic	Þriðjudagur, 4 Skerpla 2026
Islamic	9 Dhu al-Hijjah, AH 1447 (using tabular method)
ISO week date	2026-W22-2
Japanese	10 Uzuki, Reiwa 8 (Shōman, 11 days until Bōshu)
Julian	13 May, AD 2026 (AM 7534)
Julian day	2461187
Korean	10 Baemdal, 4359 DE
Maya	13.0.13.11.4; 17 Zip, 7 Kan
Roman	ante diem III Idus Maias, MMDCCLXXIX AUC
Solar Hijri	5 Khordad, SH 1405
Tibetan	10 sa ga, me pho rta 2153 or 1772 or 1000

<<	May					>>
Su	Mo	Tu	We	Th	Fr	Sa
					1	2
3	4	5	6	7	8	9
10	11	12	13	14	15	16
17	18	19	20	21	22	23
24	25	26	27	28	29	30
31
2026

May 26 in recent years
2026 (Tuesday)
2025 (Monday)
2024 (Sunday)
2023 (Friday)
2022 (Thursday)
2021 (Wednesday)
2020 (Tuesday)
2019 (Sunday)
2018 (Saturday)
2017 (Friday)

May 26 is the 146th day of the year (147th in leap years) in the Gregorian calendar; 219 days remain until the end of the year.

== Events ==
=== Pre-1600 ===
- 17 – Germanicus celebrates a triumph in Rome for his victories over the Cherusci, Chatti, and other German tribes west of the Elbe.
- 451 – Battle of Avarayr between Armenian rebels and the Sasanian Empire takes place. The Sasanids defeat the Armenians militarily but guarantee them freedom to openly practice Christianity.
- 866 – Basil I is crowned as co-emperor of the Byzantine Empire by Michael III.
- 946 – England is left temporarily without a monarch after the death of King Edmund I in a street fight, resulting in Edmund's brother Eadred assuming the throne for the minority of Edmund's two sons.
- 961 – King Otto I elects his six-year-old son Otto II as heir apparent and co-ruler of the East Frankish Kingdom. He is crowned at Aachen, and placed under the tutelage of his grandmother Matilda.
- 1135 – Alfonso VII of León and Castile is crowned in León Cathedral as Imperator totius Hispaniae (Emperor of all of Spain).
- 1293 – An earthquake strikes Kamakura, Kanagawa, Japan, killing about 23,000.
- 1328 – William of Ockham, the Franciscan Minister-General Michael of Cesena, and two other Franciscan leaders secretly leave Avignon, fearing a death sentence from Pope John XXII.
- 1538 – Geneva expels John Calvin and his followers from the city. Calvin lives in exile in Strasbourg for the next three years.
- 1573 – The Battle of Haarlemmermeer, a naval engagement in the Eighty Years' War.

=== 1601–1900 ===
- 1637 – Pequot War: A combined English and Mohegan force under John Mason attacks a village in Connecticut, massacring approximately 500 Pequots.
- 1644 – Portuguese Restoration War: Portuguese and Spanish forces both claim victory in the Battle of Montijo.
- 1736 – The Battle of Ackia is fought near the present site of Tupelo, Mississippi. British and Chickasaw soldiers repel a French and Choctaw attack on the then-Chickasaw village of Ackia.
- 1783 – A Great Jubilee Day held at North Stratford, Connecticut, celebrates the end of fighting in the American Revolutionary War.
- 1805 – Napoléon Bonaparte assumes the title of King of Italy and is crowned with the Iron Crown of Lombardy in Milan Cathedral, the gothic cathedral in Milan.
- 1821 – Establishment of the Peloponnesian Senate by the Greek rebels.
- 1822 – At least 113 people die in the Grue Church fire, the biggest fire disaster in Norway's history.
- 1864 – President Abraham Lincoln signs legislation organizing the Montana Territory.
- 1865 – Conclusion of the American Civil War: The Confederate General Edmund Kirby Smith, commander of the Trans-Mississippi division, is the last full general of the Confederate Army to surrender, at Galveston, Texas.
- 1868 – Impeachment of Andrew Johnson: President Andrew Johnson is acquitted by one vote in the United States Senate.
- 1869 – Boston University is chartered by the Commonwealth of Massachusetts.
- 1879 – Russia and the United Kingdom sign the Treaty of Gandamak establishing an Afghan state.
- 1896 – Nicholas II is crowned as the last Tsar of Imperial Russia.
- 1896 – Charles Dow publishes the first edition of the Dow Jones Industrial Average.
- 1900 – Thousand Days' War: The Colombian Conservative Party turns the tide of war in their favor with victory against the Colombian Liberal Party in the Battle of Palonegro.

=== 1901–present ===
- 1903 – Românul de la Pind, the longest-running newspaper by and about Aromanians until World War II, is founded.
- 1908 – The first major commercial oil strike in the Middle East is made at Masjed Soleyman in southwest Persia. The rights to the resource were quickly acquired by the Anglo-Persian Oil Company.
- 1918 – The Democratic Republic of Georgia is established.
- 1923 – The first 24 Hours of Le Mans is held in France. Run annually in June thereafter, it became the oldest endurance racing event in the world.
- 1926 – Abd el-Krim ends surrenders to the French, bringing an end to the Rif War.
- 1927 – The last Ford Model T rolls off the assembly line after a production run of 15,007,003 vehicles.
- 1936 – In the House of Commons of Northern Ireland, Tommy Henderson begins speaking on the Appropriation bill. By the time he sits down in the early hours of the following morning, he had spoken for ten hours.
- 1937 – Walter Reuther and members of the United Auto Workers (UAW) clash with Ford Motor Company security guards at the River Rouge Complex in Dearborn, Michigan, during the Battle of the Overpass.
- 1938 – In the United States, the House Un-American Activities Committee begins its first session.
- 1940 – World War II: Operation Dynamo: In northern France, Allied forces begin a massive evacuation from Dunkirk, France. The Battle of Dunkirk begins simultaneously as Allied defenders fight to slow down the German offensive.
- 1940 – World War II: The Siege of Calais ends with the surrender of the British and French garrison.
- 1942 – World War II: The Battle of Gazala begins, in present-day Libya.
- 1948 – The U.S. Congress passes Public Law 80-557, which permanently establishes the Civil Air Patrol as an auxiliary of the United States Air Force.
- 1966 – British Guiana gains independence, becoming Guyana.
- 1967 – The Beatles' album Sgt. Pepper's Lonely Hearts Club Band is released.
- 1968 – H-dagurinn in Iceland: Traffic changes from driving on the left to driving on the right overnight.
- 1969 – Apollo program: Apollo 10 returns to Earth after a successful eight-day test of all the components needed for the forthcoming first crewed Moon landing.
- 1970 – The Soviet Tupolev Tu-144 becomes the first commercial transport to exceed Mach 2.
- 1971 – Bangladesh Liberation War: The Pakistan Army slaughters at least 71 Hindus in Burunga, Sylhet, Bangladesh.
- 1972 – Cold War: The United States and the Soviet Union sign the Anti-Ballistic Missile Treaty.
- 1981 – Italian Prime Minister Arnaldo Forlani and his coalition cabinet resign following a scandal over membership of the pseudo-masonic lodge P2 (Propaganda Due).
- 1981 – An EA-6B Prowler crashes on the flight deck of the aircraft carrier USS Nimitz, killing 14 crewmen and injuring 45 others.
- 1983 – The 7.8 M_{w} Sea of Japan earthquake shakes northern Honshu with a maximum Mercalli intensity of VIII (Severe). A destructive tsunami is generated that leaves about 100 people dead.
- 1986 – The European Community adopts the European flag.
- 1991 – Zviad Gamsakhurdia becomes the first elected President of the Republic of Georgia in the post-Soviet era.
- 1991 – Lauda Air Flight 004 breaks apart in mid-air and crashes in the Phu Toei National Park in the Suphan Buri province of Thailand, killing all 223 people on board.
- 1998 – The Supreme Court of the United States rules in New Jersey v. New York that Ellis Island, the historic gateway for millions of immigrants, is mainly in the state of New Jersey, not New York.
- 1998 – The first "National Sorry Day" is held in Australia. Reconciliation events are held nationally, and attended by over a million people.
- 1998 – A MIAT Mongolian Airlines Harbin Y-12 crashes near Erdenet, Orkhon Province, Mongolia, resulting in 28 deaths.
- 2002 – The tugboat Robert Y. Love collides with a support pier of Interstate 40 on the Arkansas River near Webbers Falls, Oklahoma, resulting in 14 deaths and 11 others injured.
- 2003 – Ukrainian-Mediterranean Airlines Flight 4230 crashes in the Turkish town of Maçka, killing 75.
- 2008 – Severe flooding begins in eastern and southern China that will ultimately cause 148 deaths and force the evacuation of 1.3 million.
- 2014 – Narendra Modi takes oath as the 15th Prime Minister of India.
- 2020 – Protests triggered by the murder of George Floyd erupt in Minneapolis–Saint Paul, later becoming widespread across the United States and around the world.
- 2021 – Ten people are killed in a shooting at a VTA rail yard in San Jose, California, United States.
- 2025 – 65 people are injured when a car rams into a crowd on Water Street, near Liverpool F.C.'s Premier League trophy parade.

== Births ==
=== Pre-1600 ===
- 1264 – Koreyasu, Japanese prince and shōgun (died 1326)
- 1478 – Clement VII, pope of the Catholic Church (died 1534)
- 1562 – James III, margrave of Baden-Hachberg (died 1590)
- 1566 – Mehmed III, Ottoman sultan (died 1603)

=== 1601–1900 ===
- 1602 – Philippe de Champaigne, Dutch-French painter (died 1674)
- 1623 – William Petty, English economist and philosopher (died 1687)
- 1650 – John Churchill, 1st Duke of Marlborough, English general and politician, Lord Lieutenant of Oxfordshire (died 1722)
- 1667 – Abraham de Moivre, French-English mathematician and theorist (died 1754)
- 1669 – Sébastien Vaillant, French botanist and mycologist (died 1722)
- 1700 – Nicolaus Zinzendorf, German bishop and saint (died 1760)
- 1750 – William Morgan, British actuary (died 1833)
- 1799 – August Kopisch, German poet and painter (died 1853)
- 1822 – Edmond de Goncourt, French author and critic, founded the Académie Goncourt (died 1896)
- 1863 – Bob Fitzsimmons, English-New Zealand boxer (died 1917)
- 1865 – Robert W. Chambers, American author and illustrator (died 1933)
- 1867 – Mary of Teck, Queen Consort of George V of the United Kingdom, Empress Consort of India (died 1953)
- 1873 – Olaf Gulbransson, Norwegian painter and illustrator (died 1958)
- 1876 – Percy Perrin, English cricketer (died 1945)
- 1880 – W. Otto Miessner, American composer and educator (died 1967)
- 1881 – Adolfo de la Huerta, Mexican politician and provisional president, 1920 (died 1955)
- 1883 – Peter Kürten, German serial killer (died 1931)
- 1883 – Mamie Smith, American singer, actress, dancer, and pianist (died 1946)
- 1886 – Al Jolson, American singer and actor (died 1950)
- 1887 – Ba U, 2nd President of Burma (died 1963)
- 1893 – Eugene Aynsley Goossens, English conductor and composer (died 1962)
- 1895 – Dorothea Lange, American photographer and journalist (died 1965)
- 1894 – Paul Lukas, Hungarian-American actor and singer (died 1971)
- 1898 – Ernst Bacon, American pianist, composer, and conductor (died 1990)
- 1898 – Christfried Burmeister, Estonian speed skater (died 1965)
- 1899 – Antonio Barrette, Canadian lawyer and politician, 18th Premier of Quebec (died 1968)
- 1899 – Muriel McQueen Fergusson, Canadian lawyer and politician, Canadian Speaker of the Senate (died 1997)
- 1900 – Karin Juel, Swedish singer, actress, and writer (died 1976)

=== 1901–present ===
- 1904 – Tamurbek Dawletschin, Tatar author and prisoner of war (died 1983)
- 1904 – George Formby, English singer-songwriter and actor (died 1961)
- 1904 – Necip Fazıl Kısakürek, Turkish author, poet, and playwright (died 1983)
- 1904 – Vlado Perlemuter, Lithuanian-French pianist and educator (died 2002)
- 1907 – Jean Bernard, French physician and haematologist (died 2006)
- 1907 – John Wayne, American actor, director, and producer (died 1979)
- 1908 – Robert Morley, English actor (died 1992)
- 1908 – Nguyễn Ngọc Thơ, Vietnamese politician, 1st Prime Minister of the Republic of Vietnam (died 1976)
- 1909 – Matt Busby, Scottish footballer and manager (died 1994)
- 1909 – Adolfo López Mateos, Mexican politician, 48th President of Mexico (died 1969)
- 1910 – Imi Lichtenfeld, Hungarian-Israeli martial artist, boxer, and gymnast (died 1998)
- 1911 – Maurice Baquet, French actor and cellist (died 2005)
- 1911 – Henry Ephron, American playwright, screenwriter, and producer (died 1992)
- 1912 – János Kádár, Hungarian mechanic and politician, 46th Prime Minister of Hungary (died 1989)
- 1912 – Jay Silverheels, Canadian-American actor (died 1980)
- 1913 – Peter Cushing, English actor (died 1994)
- 1913 – Pierre Daninos, French author (died 2005)
- 1913 – Karin Ekelund, Swedish actress (died 1976)
- 1913 – Josef Manger, German weightlifter (died 1991)
- 1914 – Frankie Manning, American dancer and choreographer (died 2009)
- 1915 – Vernon Alley, American bassist (died 2004)
- 1916 – Henriette Roosenburg, Dutch journalist and author (died 1972)
- 1919 – Rubén González, Cuban pianist (died 2003)
- 1920 – Jack Cheetham, South African cricketer (died 1980)
- 1920 – Peggy Lee, American singer-songwriter and actress (died 2002)
- 1921 – Inge Borkh, German soprano (died 2018)
- 1923 – James Arness, American actor (died 2011)
- 1923 – Roy Dotrice, English actor (died 2017)
- 1925 – Carmen Montejo, Cuban-Mexican actress (died 2013)
- 1925 – Alec McCowen, English actor (died 2017)
- 1926 – Miles Davis, American trumpet player, composer, and bandleader (died 1991)
- 1927 – Jacques Bergerac, French actor and businessman (died 2014)
- 1928 – Jack Kevorkian, American pathologist, author, and assisted suicide activist (died 2011)
- 1929 – J. F. Ade Ajayi, Nigerian historian and academic (died 2014)
- 1929 – Ernie Carroll, Australian television personality and producer (died 2022)
- 1929 – Hans Freeman, Australian bioinorganic chemist and protein crystallographer (died 2008)
- 1929 – Catherine Sauvage, French singer and actress (died 1998)
- 1930 – Karim Emami, Indian-Iranian lexicographer and critic (died 2005)
- 1935 – Eero Loone, Estonian philosopher and academic
- 1936 – Natalya Gorbanevskaya, Russian-Polish poet and activist (died 2013)
- 1936 – Richard Harrison, American actor (died 2026)
- 1937 – Manorama, Indian actress and singer (died 2015)
- 1937 – Paul E. Patton, American politician, 59th Governor of Kentucky
- 1938 – William Bolcom, American pianist and composer
- 1938 – Andrew Clennel Palmer, British engineer (died 2019)
- 1938 – Lyudmila Petrushevskaya, Russian author and playwright
- 1938 – K. Bikram Singh, Indian director and producer (died 2013)
- 1938 – Teresa Stratas, Canadian soprano and actress
- 1940 – Monique Gagnon-Tremblay, Canadian academic and politician, Deputy Premier of Quebec
- 1940 – Levon Helm, American singer-songwriter, drummer, producer, and actor (died 2012)
- 1941 – Aldrich Ames, American CIA officer and criminal (died 2026)
- 1941 – Jim Dobbin, Scottish microbiologist and politician (died 2014)
- 1941 – Cliff Drysdale, South African tennis player and sportscaster
- 1941 – Imants Kalniņš, Latvian composer
- 1943 – Erica Terpstra, Dutch swimmer, journalist, and politician
- 1944 – Phil Edmonston, American-Canadian journalist and politician (died 2022)
- 1944 – Jan Kinder, Norwegian ice hockey player (died 2013)
- 1944 – Sam Posey, American race car driver and journalist
- 1945 – Vilasrao Deshmukh, Indian lawyer and politician, 17th Chief Minister of Maharashtra (died 2012)
- 1946 – Neshka Robeva, Bulgarian gymnast and coach
- 1946 – Mick Ronson, English guitarist, songwriter, and producer (died 1993)
- 1947 – Glenn Turner, New Zealand cricketer
- 1948 – Dayle Haddon, Canadian model and actress (died 2024)
- 1948 – Stevie Nicks, American singer-songwriter
- 1949 – Jeremy Corbyn, British journalist and politician
- 1949 – Ward Cunningham, American computer programmer, developed the first wiki
- 1949 – Pam Grier, American actress
- 1949 – Anne McGuire, Scottish educator and politician
- 1949 – Philip Michael Thomas, American actor
- 1949 – Hank Williams Jr., American singer-songwriter and guitarist
- 1951 – Ramón Calderón, Spanish lawyer and businessman
- 1951 – Lou van den Dries, Dutch mathematician
- 1951 – Muhammed Faris, Syrian military aviator and cosmonaut (died 2024)
- 1951 – Sally Ride, American physicist and astronaut, founded Sally Ride Science (died 2012)
- 1953 – Kay Hagan, American lawyer and politician (died 2019)
- 1953 – Don McAllister, English footballer and manager
- 1953 – Michael Portillo, English journalist, politician and TV presenter
- 1954 – Michael Devine, Irish Republican hunger strike, died on hunger strike (died 1981)
- 1954 – Alan Hollinghurst, English novelist, poet, short story writer, and translator
- 1954 – Denis Lebel, Canadian businessman and politician, 29th Canadian Minister of Transport
- 1956 – Fiona Shackleton, English lawyer
- 1956 – Jyoti Gogte, Indian academician
- 1957 – Diomedes Díaz, Colombian singer-songwriter (died 2013)
- 1957 – François Legault, Canadian businessman and politician
- 1957 – Roberto Ravaglia, Italian racing driver
- 1958 – Arto Bryggare, Finnish hurdler and politician
- 1958 – Margaret Colin, American actress
- 1959 – Ole Bornedal, Danish actor, director, and producer
- 1960 – Dean Lukin, Australian weightlifter
- 1960 – Romas Ubartas, Lithuanian discus thrower
- 1961 – Tarsem Singh, Indian-American director, producer, and screenwriter
- 1962 – Black, English singer-songwriter (died 2016)
- 1962 – Genie Francis, Canadian-American actress
- 1963 – Simon Armitage, English poet, playwright and novelist
- 1963 – Claude Legault, Canadian actor and screenwriter
- 1964 – Caitlín R. Kiernan, Irish-American paleontologist and author
- 1964 – Lenny Kravitz, American singer-songwriter, multi-instrumentalist, producer, and actor
- 1964 – Argiris Pedoulakis, Greek basketball player and coach
- 1966 – Helena Bonham Carter, English actress
- 1966 – Zola Budd, South African runner
- 1967 – Philip Treacy, Irish milliner, hat designer
- 1967 – Mika Yamamoto, Japanese journalist (died 2012)
- 1968 – Fernando León de Aranoa, Spanish director, producer, and screenwriter
- 1968 – Frederik X, King of Denmark
- 1969 – John Baird, Canadian politician, 10th Canadian Minister of Foreign Affairs
- 1969 – Siri Lindley, American triathlete and coach
- 1970 – Nobuhiro Watsuki, Japanese illustrator
- 1971 – Zaher Andary, Lebanese footballer
- 1971 – Matt Stone, American actor, animator, screenwriter, producer, and composer
- 1973 – Naomi Harris, Canadian-American photographer
- 1974 – Lars Frölander, Swedish swimmer
- 1975 – Lauryn Hill, American singer-songwriter, producer, and actress
- 1976 – Paul Collingwood, English cricketer and coach
- 1976 – Stephen Curry, Australian comedian and actor
- 1976 – Kenny Florian, American mixed martial artist and sportscaster
- 1977 – Nikos Chatzivrettas, Greek basketball player
- 1977 – Raina Telgemeier, American author and cartoonist
- 1977 – Luca Toni, Italian footballer
- 1977 – Misaki Ito, Japanese actress and model
- 1978 – Fabio Firmani, Italian footballer
- 1978 – Dan Parks, Australian-Scottish rugby player
- 1979 – Ashley Massaro, American wrestler and model (died 2019)
- 1979 – Natalya Nazarova, Russian sprinter
- 1979 – Mehmet Okur, Turkish basketball player
- 1980 – Louis-Jean Cormier, Canadian singer and songwriter
- 1981 – Anthony Ervin, American swimmer
- 1981 – Jason Manford, English actor, screenwriter, and television host
- 1981 – Ben Zobrist, American baseball player
- 1982 – Hasan Kabze, Turkish footballer
- 1983 – Demy de Zeeuw, Dutch footballer
- 1983 – Nathan Merritt, Australian rugby league player
- 1985 – Monika Christodoulou, Greek singer-songwriter and guitarist
- 1985 – Ashley Vincent, English footballer
- 1986 – Michel Tornéus, Swedish long jumper
- 1987 – Olcay Şahan, Turkish footballer
- 1988 – Andrea Catellani, Italian footballer
- 1988 – Juan Cuadrado, Colombian footballer
- 1988 – Dani Samuels, Australian discus thrower
- 1989 – Paula Findlay, Canadian triathlete
- 1989 – Park Ye-eun, South Korean singer
- 1991 – Ah Young, South Korean singer and actress
- 1993 – Jason Adesanya, Belgian footballer
- 1994 – Gong Myung, South Korean actor
- 1996 – Lara Goodall, South African cricketer
- 1997 – Mathew Barzal, Canadian ice hockey player
- 1999 – Micah Parsons, American football player
- 1999 – Georgia Wareham, Australian cricketer
- 2000 – Yeji, South Korean singer

== Deaths ==
=== Pre-1600 ===
- 604 – Augustine of Canterbury, Benedictine monk and archbishop
- 735 – Bede, English monk, historian, and theologian
- 818 – Ali al-Ridha, 8th of The Twelve Imams
- 926 – Yuan Xingqin, Chinese general and governor
- 946 – Edmund I, king of England (born 921)
- 1035 – Berenguer Ramon I, Spanish nobleman (born 1005)
- 1055 – Adalbert, margrave of Austria
- 1250 – Peter I, duke of Brittany
- 1339 – Aldona Ona, queen of Poland
- 1362 – Louis I, king of Naples (born 1320)
- 1421 – Mehmed I, Ottoman sultan (born 1389)
- 1512 – Bayezid II, Ottoman sultan (born 1447)
- 1536 – Francesco Berni, Italian poet (born 1498)
- 1552 – Sebastian Münster, German cartographer and cosmographer (born 1488)

=== 1601–1900 ===
- 1648 – Vincent Voiture, French poet and author (born 1597)
- 1653 – Robert Filmer, English theorist and author (born 1588)
- 1679 – Ferdinand Maria, Elector of Bavaria (born 1636)
- 1685 – Charles II, German elector palatine (born 1651)
- 1702 – Zeb-un-Nissa, Mughal princess and poet (born 1638)
- 1703 – Samuel Pepys, English politician (born 1633)
- 1742 – Pylyp Orlyk, Ukrainian diplomat (born 1672)
- 1746 – Thomas Southerne, Irish playwright (born 1660)
- 1762 – Alexander Gottlieb Baumgarten, German philosopher and academic (born 1714)
- 1799 – James Burnett, Lord Monboddo, Scottish linguist, biologist, and judge (born 1714)
- 1818 – Michael Andreas Barclay de Tolly, Russian field marshal and politician, Governor-General of Finland (born 1761)
- 1818 – Manuel Rodríguez Erdoíza, Chilean lawyer and guerrilla leader (born 1785)
- 1824 – Capel Lofft, English lawyer (born 1751)
- 1840 – Sidney Smith, English admiral and politician (born 1764)
- 1881 – Jakob Bernays, German philologist and academic (born 1824)
- 1883 – Abdelkader El Djezairi, Algerian ruler (born 1808)

=== 1901–present ===
- 1902 – Almon Brown Strowger, American soldier and inventor (born 1839)
- 1908 – Mirza Ghulam Ahmad, Indian religious leader, founded the Ahmadiyya movement (born 1835)
- 1914 – Jacob August Riis, Danish-American journalist, photographer, and reformer (born 1849)
- 1924 – Victor Herbert, Irish-American cellist, composer, and conductor, founded the American Society of Composers, Authors and Publishers (born 1859)
- 1925 – William H. Shockley, American mining engineer, amateur photographer, and hobbyist botanist (born 1855)
- 1926 – Srečko Kosovel, Slovenian poet (born 1904)
- 1933 – Horatio Bottomley, English financier, journalist, and politician (born 1860)
- 1933 – Jimmie Rodgers, American singer-songwriter and guitarist (born 1897)
- 1939 – Charles Horace Mayo, American physician, co-founded Mayo Clinic (born 1865)
- 1943 – Edsel Ford, American businessman (born 1893)
- 1943 – Alice Tegnér, Swedish organist, composer, and educator (born 1864)
- 1944 – Christian Wirth, German SS officer (born 1885)
- 1948 – Torsten Bergström, Swedish actor and director (born 1896)
- 1951 – Lincoln Ellsworth, American explorer (born 1880)
- 1954 – Lionel Conacher, Canadian football player and politician (born 1900)
- 1955 – Alberto Ascari, Italian racing driver (born 1918)
- 1956 – Al Simmons, American baseball player and coach (born 1902)
- 1959 – Philip Kassel, American gymnast (born 1876)
- 1964 – Ruben Oskar Auervaara, Finnish fraudster (born 1906)
- 1966 – Elizabeth Dilling, American author and activist (born 1894)
- 1969 – Paul Hawkins, Australian racing driver (born 1937)
- 1969 – Allan Haines Loughead, American engineer, co-founded the Lockheed Corporation (born 1889)
- 1974 – Silvio Moser, Swiss racing driver (born 1941)
- 1976 – Martin Heidegger, German philosopher and academic (born 1889)
- 1978 – Cybele Andrianou, Greek actress (born 1887)
- 1979 – George Brent, Irish-American actor (born 1904)
- 1984 – Elizabeth Peer, American journalist (born 1936)
- 1989 – Don Revie, English footballer and manager (born 1927)
- 1994 – Sonny Sharrock, American guitarist (born 1940)
- 1995 – Friz Freleng, American animator, director, and producer (born 1906)
- 1997 – Ralph Horween, American football player and coach (born 1896)
- 1999 – Paul Sacher, Swiss conductor and philanthropist (born 1906)
- 1999 – Waldo Semon, American chemist and engineer (born 1898)
- 2001 – Vittorio Brambilla, Italian racing driver (born 1937)
- 2001 – Anne Haney, American actress (born 1934)
- 2001 – Moven Mahachi, Zimbabwean soldier and politician, Zimbabwean Minister of Defence (born 1952)
- 2001 – Dona Massin, Canadian actress and choreographer (born 1917)
- 2002 – Mamo Wolde, Ethiopian runner (born 1932)
- 2003 – Kathleen Winsor, American journalist and author (born 1919)
- 2004 – Nikolai Chernykh, Russian astronomer (born 1931)
- 2005 – Eddie Albert, American actor (born 1906)
- 2005 – Chico Carrasquel, Venezuelan baseball player and manager (born 1928)
- 2005 – Ruth Laredo, American pianist and educator (born 1937)
- 2005 – Leslie Smith, English businessman, co-founded Lesney Products (born 1918)
- 2006 – Édouard Michelin, French businessman (born 1963)
- 2006 – Kevin O'Flanagan, Irish footballer and physician (born 1919)
- 2007 – Jack Edward Oliver, English illustrator (born 1942)
- 2007 – Howard Porter, American basketball player (born 1948)
- 2008 – Sydney Pollack, American actor, director, and screenwriter (born 1934)
- 2008 – Zita Urbonaitė, Lithuanian cyclist (born 1973)
- 2009 – Mihalis Papagiannakis, Greek journalist and politician (born 1941)
- 2009 – Peter Zezel, Canadian ice hockey and soccer player (born 1965)
- 2010 – Art Linkletter, Canadian-American radio and television host (born 1912)
- 2010 – Chris Moran, English air marshal and pilot (born 1956)
- 2010 – Kieran Phelan, Irish politician (born 1949)
- 2011 – Arisen Ahubudu, Sri Lankan scholar, author, and playwright (born 1920)
- 2012 – Arthur Decabooter, Belgian cyclist (born 1936)
- 2012 – Leo Dillon, American illustrator (born 1933)
- 2012 – Stephen Healey, Welsh captain and footballer (born 1982)
- 2012 – Hiroshi Miyazawa, Japanese politician (born 1921)
- 2012 – Hans Schmidt, Canadian wrestler (born 1925)
- 2012 – Jim Unger, English-Canadian illustrator (born 1937)
- 2013 – Ray Barnhart, American businessman and politician (born 1928)
- 2013 – John Bierwirth, American lawyer and businessman (born 1924)
- 2013 – Roberto Civita, Italian-Brazilian businessman (born 1936)
- 2013 – Tom Lichtenberg, American football player and coach (born 1940)
- 2013 – Otto Muehl, Austrian painter (born 1925)
- 2013 – Jack Vance, American author (born 1916)
- 2014 – Baselios Thoma Didymos I, Indian metropolitan (born 1921)
- 2014 – Miodrag Radulovacki, Serbian-American academic and neuropharmacologist (born 1933)
- 2014 – William R. Roy, American physician, journalist, and politician (born 1926)
- 2014 – Hooshang Seyhoun, Iranian-Canadian architect, sculptor, and painter (born 1920)
- 2015 – Vicente Aranda, Spanish director, producer, and screenwriter (born 1926)
- 2015 – Les Johnson, Australian politician and diplomat, Australian High Commissioner to New Zealand (born 1924)
- 2015 – Robert Kraft, American astronomer and academic (born 1927)
- 2015 – João Lucas, Portuguese footballer (born 1979)
- 2016 – Hedy Epstein, German-born American human rights activist and Holocaust survivor (born 1924)
- 2017 – Zbigniew Brzezinski, Polish-born American politician (born 1928)
- 2019 – Prem Tinsulanonda, Former Prime Minister of Thailand (born 1920)
- 2022 – Andy Fletcher, English musician (born 1961)
- 2022 – Ray Liotta, American actor (born 1954)
- 2022 – Alan White, English drummer (born 1949)

== Holidays and observances ==
- Christian feast day:
  - Andrew Kaggwa
  - Augustine of Canterbury (Anglican Communion and Eastern Orthodox)
  - Lambert of Vence
  - Mariana de Jesús de Paredes
  - Martyrs of the Paris Commune
  - Peter Sanz (one of Martyr Saints of China)
  - Philip Neri
  - Pope Eleutherius
  - Zachary, Bishop of Vienne
  - May 26 (Eastern Orthodox liturgics)
- Independence Day, commemorates the declaration of independence of the Democratic Republic of Georgia in 1918 (Georgia)
- Independence Day, celebrates the independence of Guyana from the United Kingdom in 1966.
- Mother's Day (Poland)
- National Paper Airplane Day (United States)
- National Sorry Day (Australia)
