= CQC =

CQC may refer to:

- Close-Quarters combat, a type of warfare
- Caiga Quien Caiga, an Argentine television show
- Custe o Que Custar, a Brazilian television show
- Care Quality Commission, an English health and social care service regulator
- Catoctin Quaker Camp, Maryland, United States, a summer camp
- Centre for Quantum Computation, an alliance of quantum information research groups
- Central Queensland Aviation College's ICAO airline designator
- China Quality Certification Center, a quality certification mark or the organization issuing such approvals, located in China
- Complete Quadratic Combination, see Seismic analysis
