= Electronic Product Environmental Assessment Tool =

The Electronic Product Environmental Assessment Tool (EPEAT) is a method for purchasers (governments, institutions, consumers, etc.) to evaluate the effect of a product on the environment. It assesses various lifecycle environmental aspects of a device and ranks products as Gold, Silver or Bronze based on a set of environmental performance criteria. The system is managed by the Green Electronics Council and launched in 2006. In 2007, a U.S. executive order required federal agencies to use EPEAT when purchasing computer systems.

== Background ==
EPEAT is managed by the Green Electronics Council, a non-profit organization founded in 2005 to inspire and catalyze environmental leadership throughout the lifecycle of electronic technologies. In the system, device manufacturers self-declare which environmental criteria their products meet, with those declarations overseen by a network of Conformity Assurance Bodies that help manufacturers demonstrate that their products meet the IEEE 1680 family of ‘green electronics’ standards. Products are rated Bronze, Silver or Gold depending upon the number of criteria the devices meet. Bronze-rated products meet all the required criteria in each EPEAT product category. Silver-rated products meet all the required criteria plus at least 50% of the optional criteria. Gold-rated products meet all the required criteria plus at least 75% of the optional criteria.

== History ==
The system launched in 2006 with 60 products from three different PC and Display (monitor) manufacturers. The PC category includes 51 different environmental criteria - 23 required and 28 optional— that measure a product's efficiency and environmental attributes. In 2013, two additional categories made their EPEAT debut: Imaging Equipment in February and Televisions in April.

On January 24, 2007, President George W. Bush issued Executive Order 13423, which required all United States Federal agencies to use EPEAT when purchasing computer systems. This commitment was renewed on October 5, 2009 by President Obama's Executive Order 13514. The U.S. Federal Acquisition Regulations (FAR) were subsequently adjusted to require all federal agencies to purchase 'at least 95 percent' of their electronics based on EPEAT status if an appropriate EPEAT category exists for those devices. The FAR was updated in 2015 to reflect EPEAT's addition of the Imaging Equipment and Television categories.

In January 2010, Amazon.com began using EPEAT to identify greener electronic products on its website.

Multiple international organizations provide EPEAT-registration services for manufacturers in North America, Europe, Asia, South America and Australia. These organizations, called Conformity Assurance Bodies, include Green Electronics Council's Conformity Assurance Body, Dekra, UL Environment, Intertek, TuV Rheinland, CQC, CESI and VDE. Each company has Auditors qualified to evaluate the conformance claims of electronics manufacturers and suppliers.

In July 2014, the EPEAT system expanded to support product registrations in India. With the addition of India, EPEAT was available in 43 countries.

== Apple's Retina MacBook Pro controversy ==
In 2012, Apple's Retina MacBook Pro debuted on EPEAT with a Gold rating after briefly deciding to remove all of its products from EPEAT. The laptop was accepted following a number of "clarifications" of the standard, for example specifying that the presence of USB ports was now considered sufficient to meet the upgradability requirement, and that tools to disassemble the laptop need only be available for purchase by the public. iFixit.org labelled the laptop as "the least repairable, least recyclable computer encountered in more than a decade of disassembling electronics" and joined Greenpeace in denouncing a suspected case of greenwashing.
