= Willie Cole =

American sculptor (born 1955)

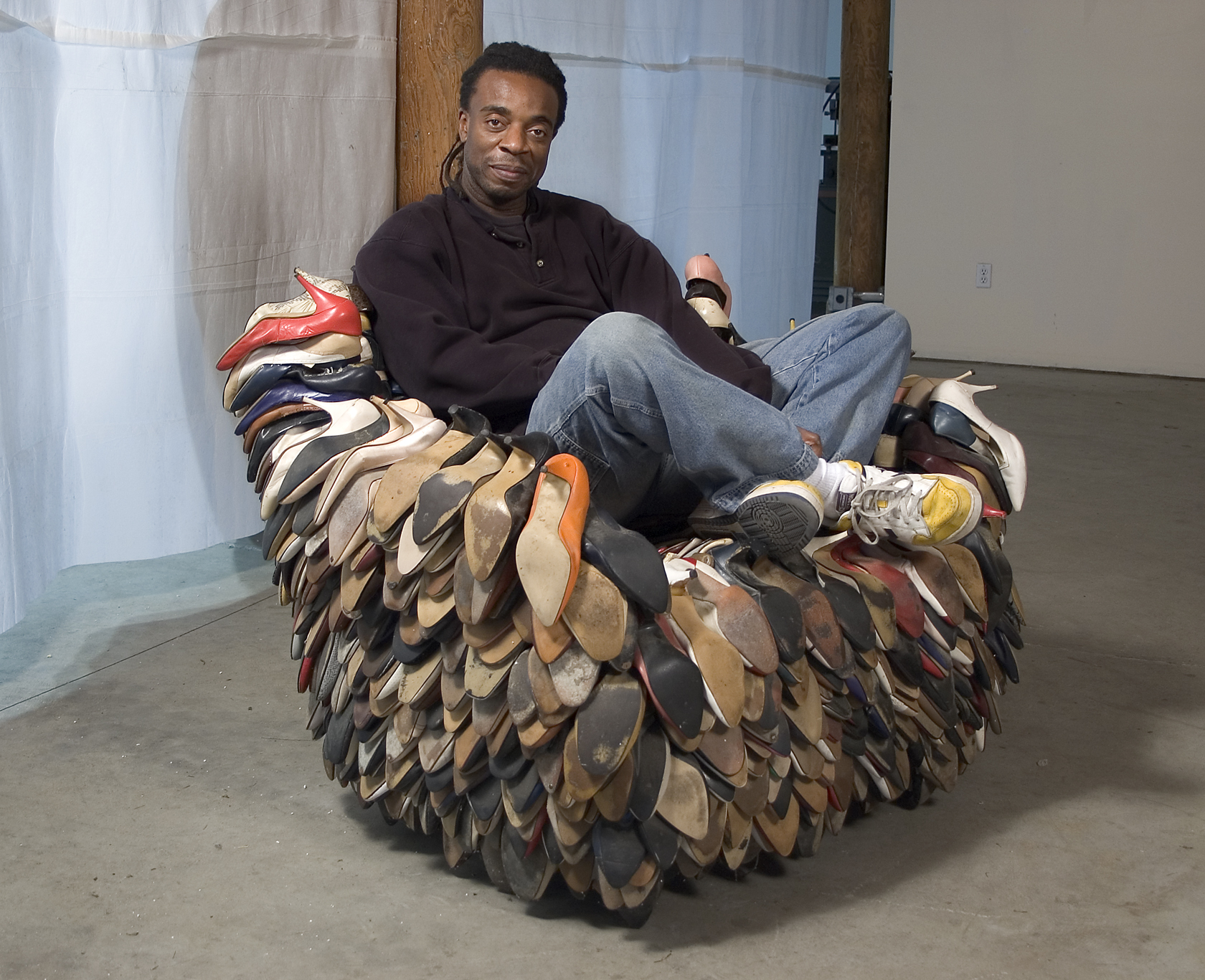
- Born: Willie Cole; January 3, 1955 (age 71); Somerville, New Jersey, U.S.
- Education: Bachelor of Fine Arts from the School of Visual Arts, New York
- Known for: Sculpture, Painting, Visual Arts
- Awards: 2006 David C. Driskell Prize
- Website: http://www.williecole.com/

Willie Cole (born January 3, 1955) is a contemporary American sculptor, printer, and conceptual and visual artist. His work uses contexts of postmodern eclecticism, and combines references and appropriation from African and African-American imagery. He also has used Dada's readymades and Surrealism’s transformed objects, as well as icons of American pop culture or African and Asian masks.

== Works ==
Schwinn tji-wara (2002) at the Walter E. Washington Convention Center in Washington, DC

Cole is best known for assembling and transforming ordinary domestic and used objects such as irons, ironing boards, high-heeled shoes, hair dryers, bicycle parts, wooden matches, lawn jockeys, and other discarded appliances and hardware, into works of art and installations.

"The objects that I use I see as them finding me, more so than me finding them and looking for an object. I see an object and suddenly I recognize what I can do with the object. So in that sense there is an energy or spirit connection to the object. I am exploring the possibilities of these objects. [...] I say that I can make anything out of everything and everything out of anything. I challenge myself to do that. Sometimes it takes longer than I’d like which is why I work in series as I try to master the thing. I made art out of irons for 15 years before I switched to bicycles. I do shoes steady now since 2005 but it’s all the same thing to me. It’s a different object on our level of everyday perception but once you see it as a particle the possibilities are endless."

In 1989, Cole garnered attention in the art world with works using the steam iron as a motif. Cole imprinted iron scorch marks on a variety of media, showing not only their wide-ranging decorative potential but also to reference Cole’s African-American heritage. He used the marks to suggest the transport and branding of slaves, the domestic role of black women, and ties to Ghanaian cloth design and Yoruba gods.

Through the repetitive use of single objects in multiples, Cole's assembled sculptures acquire a transcending and renewed metaphorical meaning, or become a critique of our consumer culture. Cole’s work is generally discussed in the context of postmodern eclecticism, combining references and appropriation ranging from African and African-American imagery, to Dada’s readymades and Surrealism's transformed objects, and icons of American pop culture or African and Asian masks, into highly original and witty assemblages. Some of Cole’s interactive installations also draw on simple game board structures that include the element of chance while physically engaging the viewer.

His "Anne Klein With a Baby in Transit," from 2009, uses discarded high-heeled shoes to depict a mother and child. The well-worn black shoes combine to recall traditional African sculptures. It was a gift from the Brenden Mann Foundation to the Minneapolis Institute of Arts.

Cole's work is included in the Afrofuturist Period Room exhibition Before Yesterday We Could Fly at the Metropolitan Museum of Art.

== Shows ==
=== Select solo shows ===
- 2019, "Willie Cole: Bella Figura," Alexander and Bonin, New York, NY
- 2019, "Willie Cole: Beauties," Radcliffe Institute, Harvard University, Cambridge, MA
- 2017, "Willie Cole: Made in Newark," College of Architecture and Design Gallery, The New Jersey Institute of Technology, Newark, NJ
- 2017, "Making Everything Out of Anything: Prints, Drawings, and Sculptures by Willie Cole," Snite Museum of Art, University of Notre Dame, Notre Dame, IN
- 2016 - 2017, "Willie Cole: On-Site," David C. Driskell Center, University of Maryland; Museum of Art, University of New Hampshire; Arthur Ross Gallery, Philadelphia
- 2015, "Willie Cole: Aquaphilic," 808 Gallery, Boston University, Boston, MA
- 2015, "Willie Cole," Mazmanian Gallery, Framingham State University, Framingham, MA
- 2015, "Flawlessly Feminine: Women Who Graced the Cover and Works by Willie Cole," The Diggs Gallery, Winston-Salem State University, Winston-Salem, NC
- 2015, "Willie Cole: Transformations," Abroms-Engel Institute for the Visual Arts, University of Alabama at Birmingham, Birmingham, AL
- 2013 - 2014, "Complex Conversations: Willie Cole Sculptures and Wall Works," Albertine Monroe-Brown Gallery, Western Michigan University, Kalamazoo, MI; Weatherspoon Art Museum, University of North Carolina at Greensboro, Greensboro, NC; The College of Wooster Art Museum, Ebert Art Center, Wooster, OH; Faulconer Gallery, Grinnell College, Grinnell, IA; Houghton College, Houghton, NY
- 2013 - 2014, "E Pluribus Unum," Grounds for Sculpture, Hamilton, NJ
- 2013, "If wishes were horses...," Alexander and Bonin, New York, NY
- 2013, "Willie Cole: Illuminations and Transformations," Schneider Museum of Art at Southern Oregon University, Ashland, OR
- 2013, "From Water to Light," Prospect Street Firestation Gallery, Newark, NJ
- 2012, "Deep Impressions: Willie Cole Works on Paper and Sculpture," Rowan University Art Gallery, Glassboro, NJ
- 2010 - 2011, "Deep Impressions: Willie Cole Works on Paper," The James Gallery, The City University of New York, New York, NY; Memphis Brooks Museum of Art, Memphis, TN; Sarah Moody Gallery of Art, University of Alabama, Tuscaloosa, AL

=== Select group shows ===
- 2017, "Operation Chromebody," Highpoint Editions, Minneapolis
- 2017, "Walker Street Summer," Alexander and Bonin, New York
- 2015, "Surrealism: The Conjured Life," MCA Chicago, Chicago
- 2012, "Afro: Black Identity in America and Brazil," Tamarind Institute, Albuquerque,
- 2011, "Reconfiguring an African Icon: Odes to the Mask by Modern and Contemporary Artists from Three Continents," The Metropolitan Museum of Art, New York, NY

== Life ==
=== Early life ===
Willie Cole was born on January 3, 1955 in Somerville, New Jersey, and after his parents separated he moved with his mother and sister to Newark, New Jersey, where he found a passion for the field of arts. He says, "I think I was an artist in a previous life. When I was 3 years old, my mom found me drawing in the kitchen, and since then, my family always said I was an artist. I went along with it. I enjoyed it." Cole later took classes at the Newark Museum. After attending the museum for lessons, he was accepted to Newark Arts High School.

Cole received his Bachelor of Fine Arts degree from the School of Visual Arts in New York in 1976, and continued his studies at the Art Students League of New York from 1976 to 1979. Cole lives and works in Mine Hill Township, New Jersey.

=== Career ===
In 1978, Cole found work as a graphic designer for the Queens County Borough Hall as part of the Comprehensive Employment and Training Act's employment of artists. Further pursuing his passion, he later progressed and hosted his first major gallery show, located at Franklin Furnace Gallery in New York City, in 1989. In 1990, he participated as the Artist-In-Residence at the Studio Museum, located in Harlem, New York.

Willie Cole is the recipient of many awards. In 1991, he received The Penny McCall Foundation Grant. In 1995, he received the Louis Comfort Tiffany Foundation Grant. In 1996, he received a Joan Mitchell Foundation Award, which annually supports 15 US-based artists working in painting and sculpture, providing financial support, skill development, and community building. In 2000, Cole was artist-in-residence at the John Michael Kohler Arts Center Arts/ Industry Program in Sheboygan, Wisconsin. In 2002, he received the Augustus Saint-Gaudens Memorial Fellowship, an award presented to an emerging artist practicing in the United States. In 2006, he received the David C. Driskell Prize, the first national award to honor and celebrate contributions to the field of African-American art and art history, established by the High Museum of Art in Atlanta, Georgia.

Cole is represented by Alexander and Bonin Gallery in New York; and by Guido Maus, beta pictoris gallery / Maus Contemporary in Birmingham, AL.

In 2023, Cole's work With a Heart of Gold, was acquired by the Pérez Art Museum Miami through the institution's Fund for Black Art program.
