= Jack Odell =

English inventor

John William Odell, OBE (19 March 1920 – 7 July 2007) was the English inventor of Matchbox toys and the engineer responsible for their unique design. He joined with partners Leslie Smith and Rodney Smith to form Lesney Products.

The company initially made small products for cars such as dashboards and doorhandles. Odell designed a small steamroller in 1952 for his daughter to take to school. It proved to be a big hit for her and her friends. The company started manufacturing small toys to meet the demand with a million copies of a small coach sold during the coronation of Queen Elizabeth II in 1953. The first 3 vehicles were a road roller, Muir Hill dumper and a cement mixer. All were introduced in 1953.

By 1966, more than 100 million Matchbox toys were sold each year. Odell retired in 1973 but returned in 1981 when Lesney ran into financial problems. The company was declared insolvent in 1982 and sold to Universal Toys.

He founded Lledo, a small vehicle model manufacturing company, and was active in that business until 1999 when he retired. Odell had Parkinson's disease when he died in July 2007.
