= Hair dryer =

Electronic household appliance for personal care

Hair Dryer
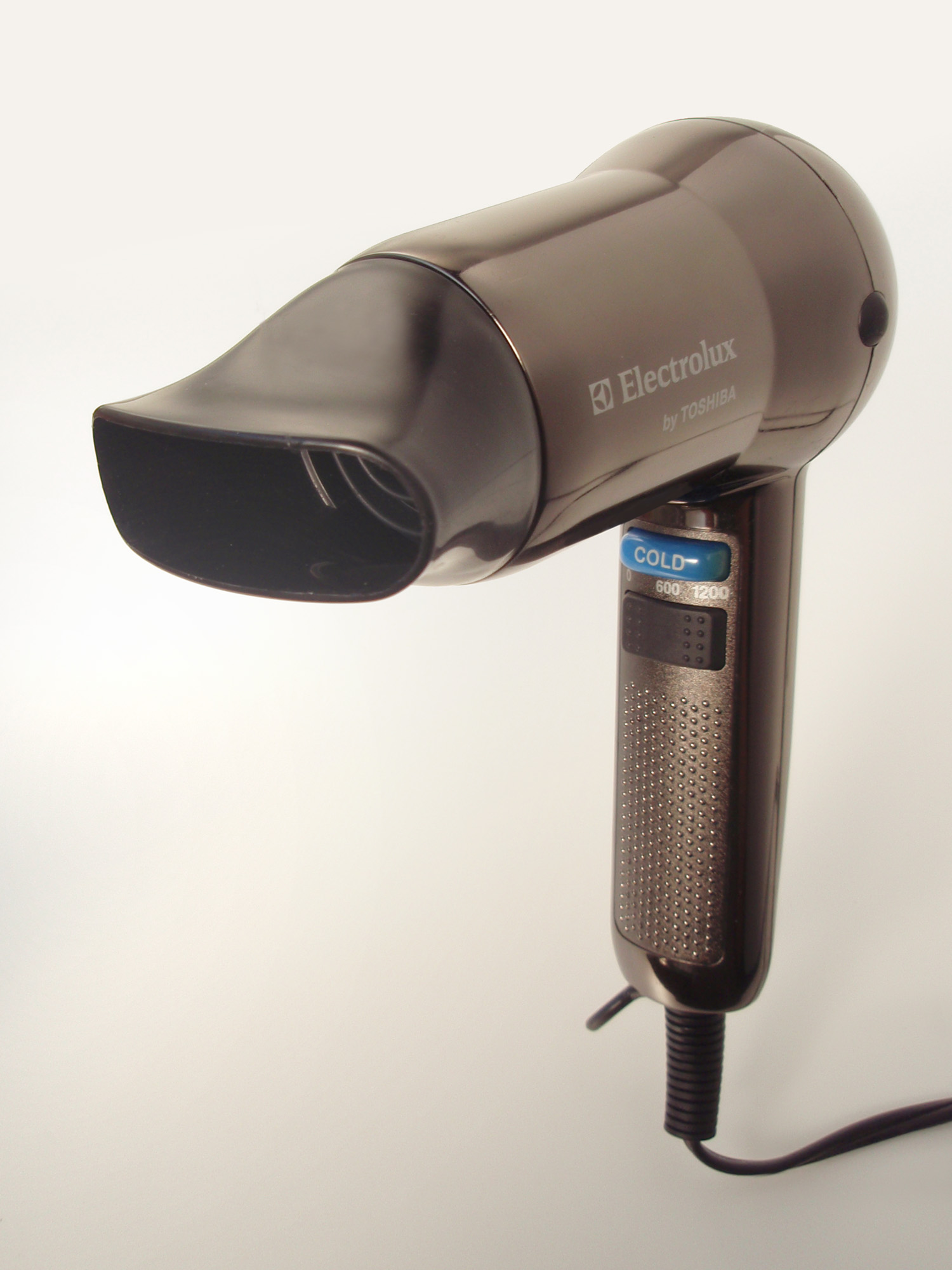
- A modern handheld electric hair dryer.
- Type: Home appliance / Styling tool
- Inventor: Alexandre-Ferdinand Godefroy
- Inception: 1888; 138 years ago
- Current supplier: Global

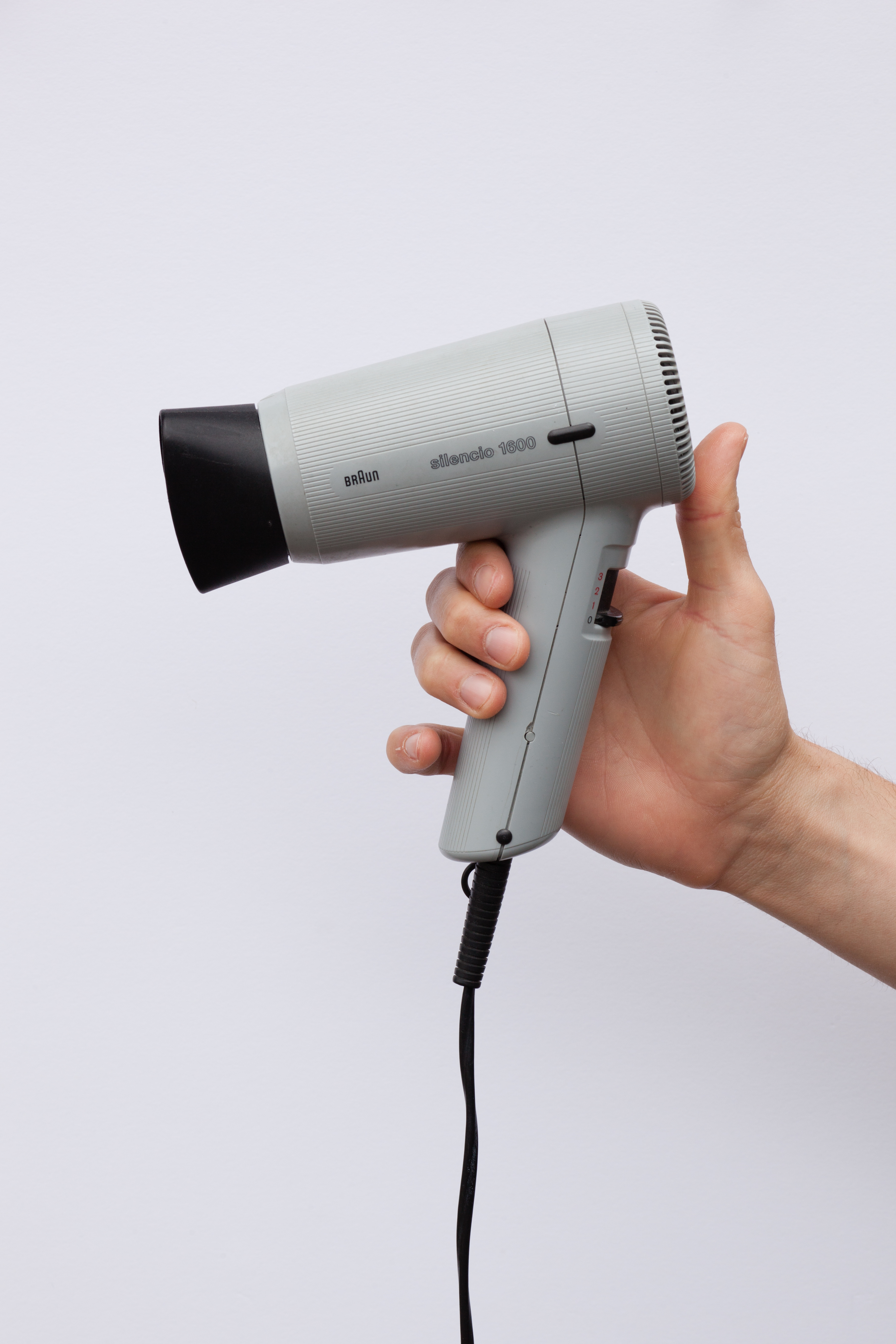
A modern Braun hair dryer

A hair dryer (the handheld type also referred to as a blow dryer) is an electromechanical device that blows ambient air in hot or warm settings for styling or drying hair. Hair dryers enable better control over the shape and style of hair, by accelerating and controlling the formation of temporary hydrogen bonds within each strand. These bonds are powerful, (Note: Allowing stronger hair shaping than the sulfur bonds formed by permanent waving products.) but are temporary and extremely vulnerable to humidity. They disappear with a single washing of the hair.

Hairstyles using hair dryers usually have volume and discipline, which can be further improved with styling products, hairbrushes, and combs during drying to add tension, hold and lift. Hair dryers were invented in the late 19th century. The first model was created in 1912 by Gabriel Kazanjian. Handheld, household hair dryers first appeared in 1920. Hair dryers are used in beauty salons by professional stylists, as well as by consumers at home.

== History ==
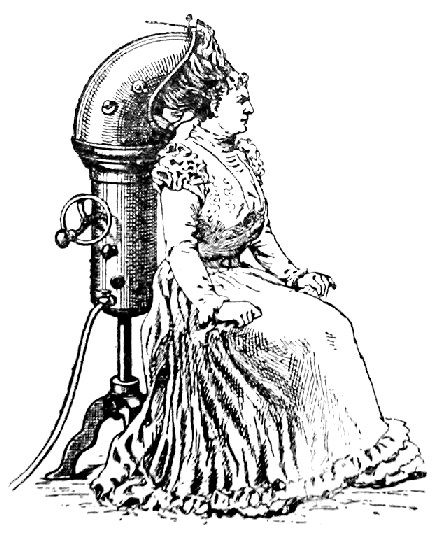
An early hair dryer

In 1888 the first hair dryer was invented by French stylist Alexandre Godefroy. His invention was a large, seated version that consisted of a bonnet that attached to the chimney pipe of a gas stove. Godefroy invented it for use in his hair salon in France, and it was not portable or handheld. It could only be used by having the person sit underneath it.

Armenian American inventor Gabriel Kazanjian was the first to patent a hair dryer in the United States, in 1911. Around 1920, hair dryers began to go on the market in handheld form. This was due to innovations by National Stamping and Electric works under the white cross brand, and later U.S. Racine Universal Motor Company and the Hamilton Beach Co., which allowed the dryer to be small enough to be held by hand. Even in the 1920s, the new dryers were often heavy, weighing in at approximately 1 kg (2 pounds), and were difficult to use. They also had many instances of overheating and electrocution. Hair dryers were only capable of using 100 W, which increased the amount of time needed to dry hair (the average dryer today can use up to 2,000 W of heat).

Since the 1920s, development of the hair dryer has mainly focused on improving the wattage and superficial exterior and material changes. In fact, the mechanism of the dryer has not had any significant changes since its inception. One of the more important changes for the hair dryer is to be made of plastic, so that it is more lightweight. This really caught on in the 1960s with the introduction of better electrical motors and the improvement of plastics. Another important change happened in 1954 when GEC changed the design of the dryer to move the motor inside the casing.

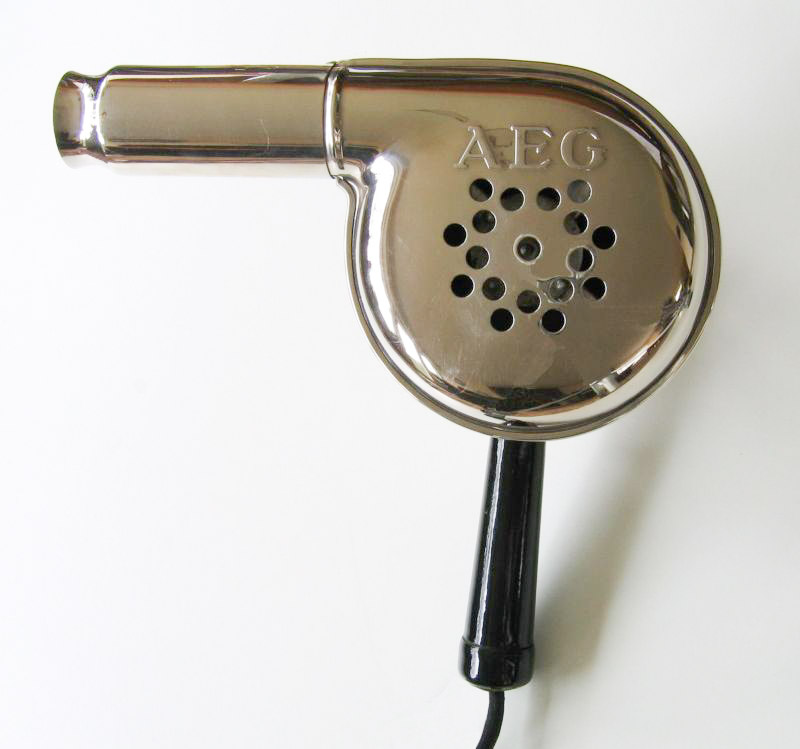
Dryer made by AEG, c. 1920–1925

The bonnet dryer was introduced to consumers in 1951. This type worked by having the dryer, usually in a small portable box, connected to a tube that went into a bonnet with holes in it that could be placed on top of a person's head. This worked by giving an even amount of heat to the whole head at once.

The 1950s also saw the introduction of the rigid-hood hair dryer which is the type most frequently seen in salons. It had a hard plastic helmet that wraps around the person's head. This dryer works similarly to the bonnet dryer of the 1950s but at a much higher wattage.

In the 1970s, the U.S. Consumer Product Safety Commission set up guidelines that hair dryers had to meet to be considered safe to manufacture. Since 1991 the CPSC has mandated that all dryers must use a ground fault circuit interrupter so that it cannot electrocute a person if it gets wet. By 2000, reported deaths by blowdryers had dropped from fewer than ten to fewer than two people a year.

== Function ==
Most hair dryers consist of electric heating coils and a fan that blows the air (usually powered by a universal motor). The heating element in most dryers is a bare, coiled nichrome wire that is wrapped around mica insulators. Nichrome is used due to its high resistivity, and low tendency to corrode when heated.

A survey of stores in 2007 showed that most hair dryers had ceramic heating elements (like ceramic heaters) because of their "instant heat" capability. This means that it takes less time for the dryers to heat up and for the hair to dry.

Many of these dryers have "cool shot" buttons that turn off the heater and blow room-temperature air while the button is pressed. This function helps to maintain the hairstyle by setting it. The colder air reduces frizz and can help to promote shine in the hair.

Many feature "ionic" operation, to reduce the build-up of static electricity in the hair, though the efficacy of ionic technology is of some debate. Manufacturers claim this makes the hair "smoother".

Hair dryers are available with attachments, such as diffusers, airflow concentrators, and comb nozzles.

- A diffuser is an attachment that is used on hair that is fine, colored, permed or naturally curly. It diffuses the jet of air, so that the hair is not blown around while it dries. The hair dries more slowly, at a cooler temperature, and with less physical disturbance. This makes it so that the hair is less likely to frizz and it gives the hair more volume.
- An airflow concentrator does the opposite of a diffuser. It makes the end of the hair dryer narrower and thus helps to concentrate the heat into one spot to make it dry rapidly.
- The comb nozzle attachment is the same as the airflow concentrator, but it ends with comb-like teeth so that the user can dry the hair using the dryer without a brush or comb.

Hair dryers have been cited as an effective treatment for head lice.

== Types ==
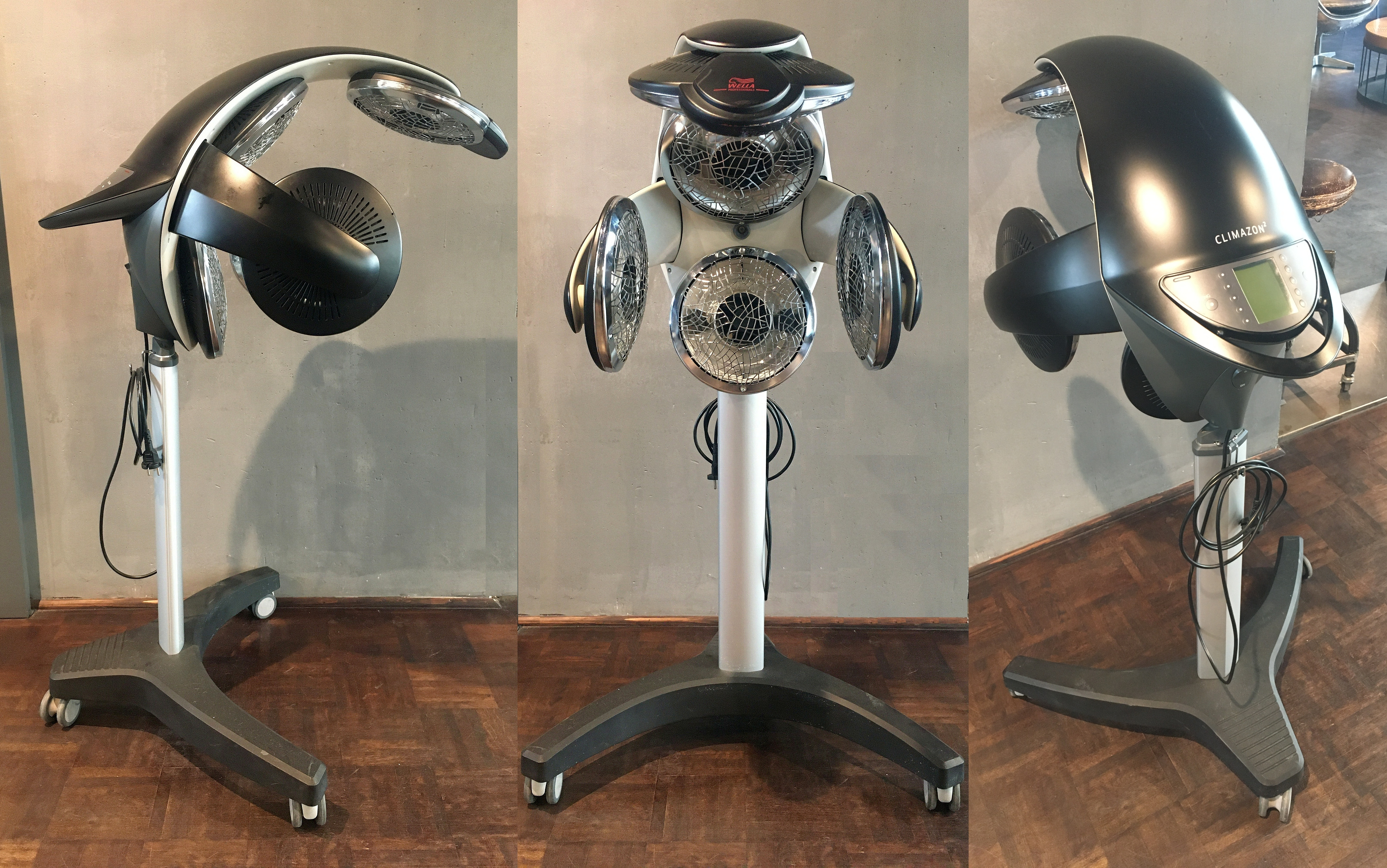
Special type of hooded dryer: Professional electrical infrared hair dryer for hair salons, c. 2010s

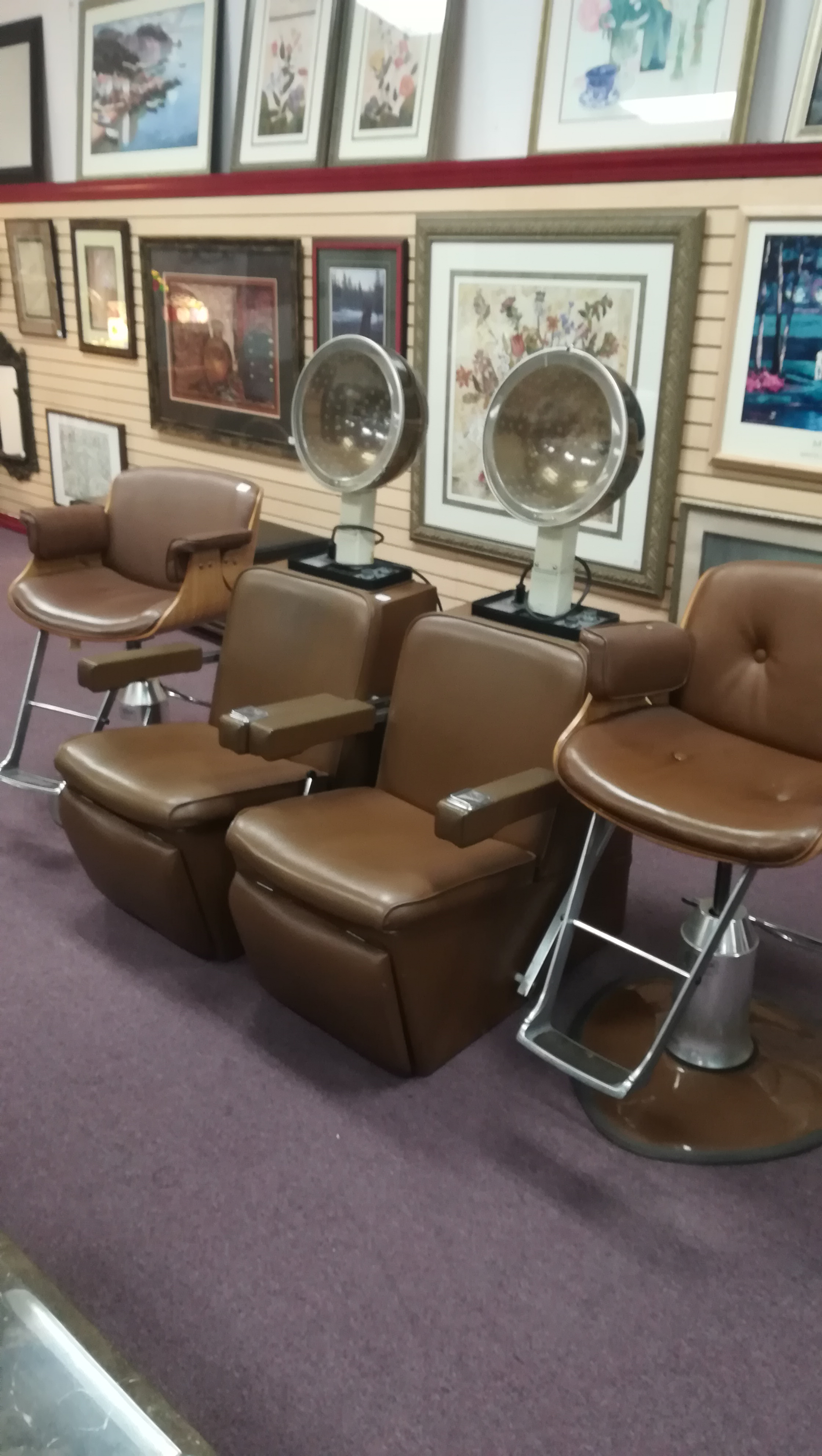
Older style hood dryers, common in the United States in the late 20th century

Today there are two major types of hair dryers: the handheld and the rigid-hood dryer.

A hood dryer has a hard plastic dome that fits over a person's head to dry their hair. Hot air is blown out through tiny openings around the inside of the dome so the hair is dried evenly. Hood dryers are mainly found in hair salons.

=== Hair dryer brush ===
A hair dryer brush (also called "hot air brush" and "round brush hair dryer" and "hair styler") has the shape of a brush and it is used as a volumizer too.

There are two types of round brush hair dryers – rotating and static. Rotating round brush hair dryers have barrels that rotate automatically while static round brush hair dryers don't.

== Gallery ==
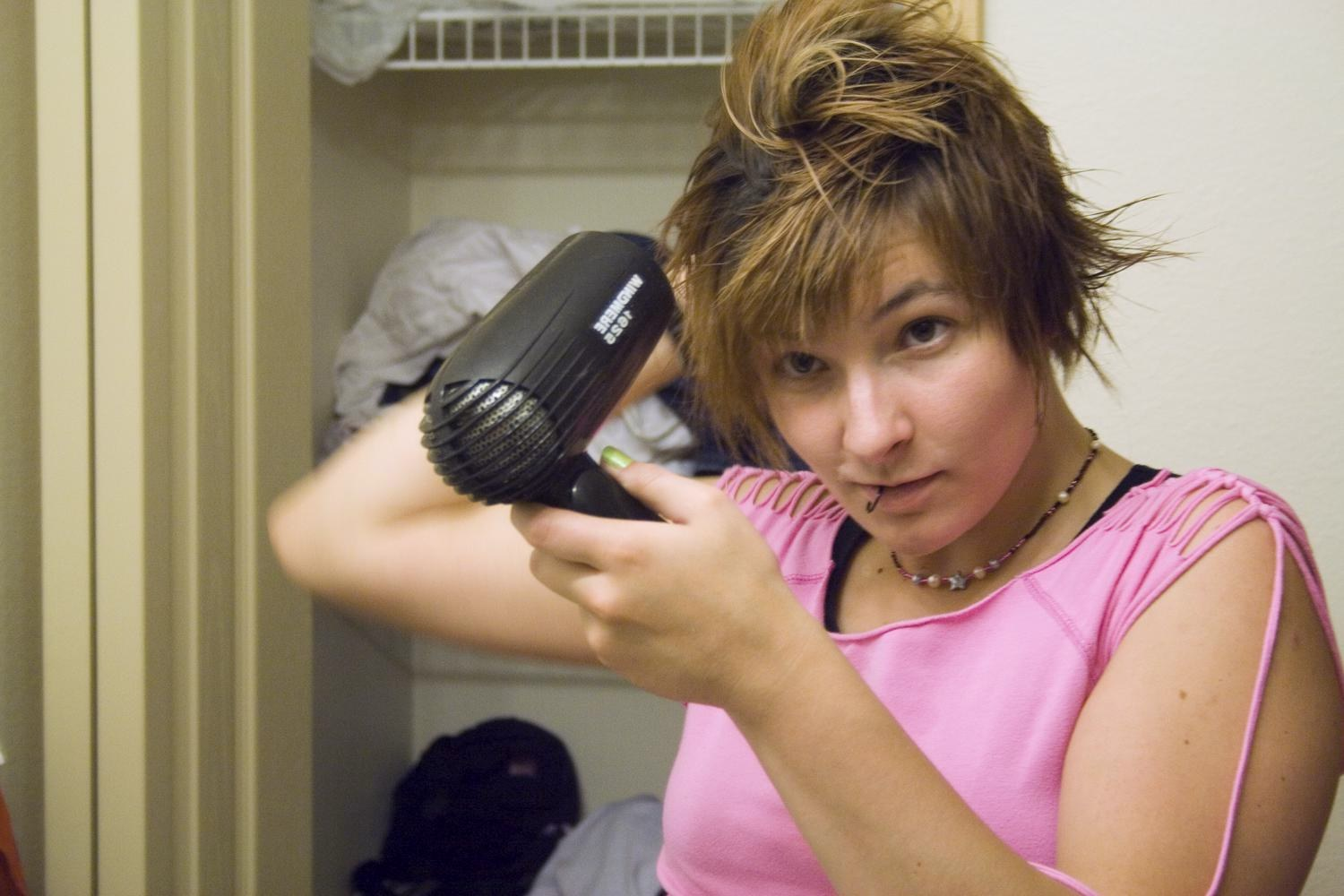
The normal use of a hair dryer today

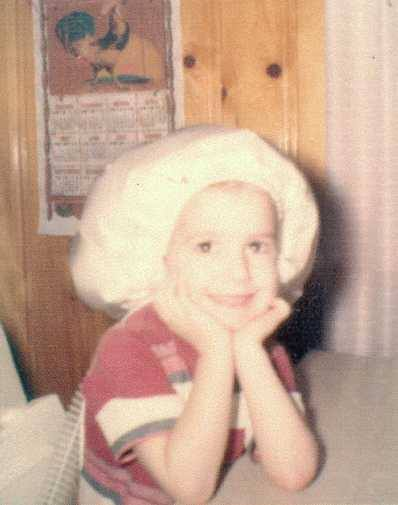
Bonnet hair dryer, circa early 1970s

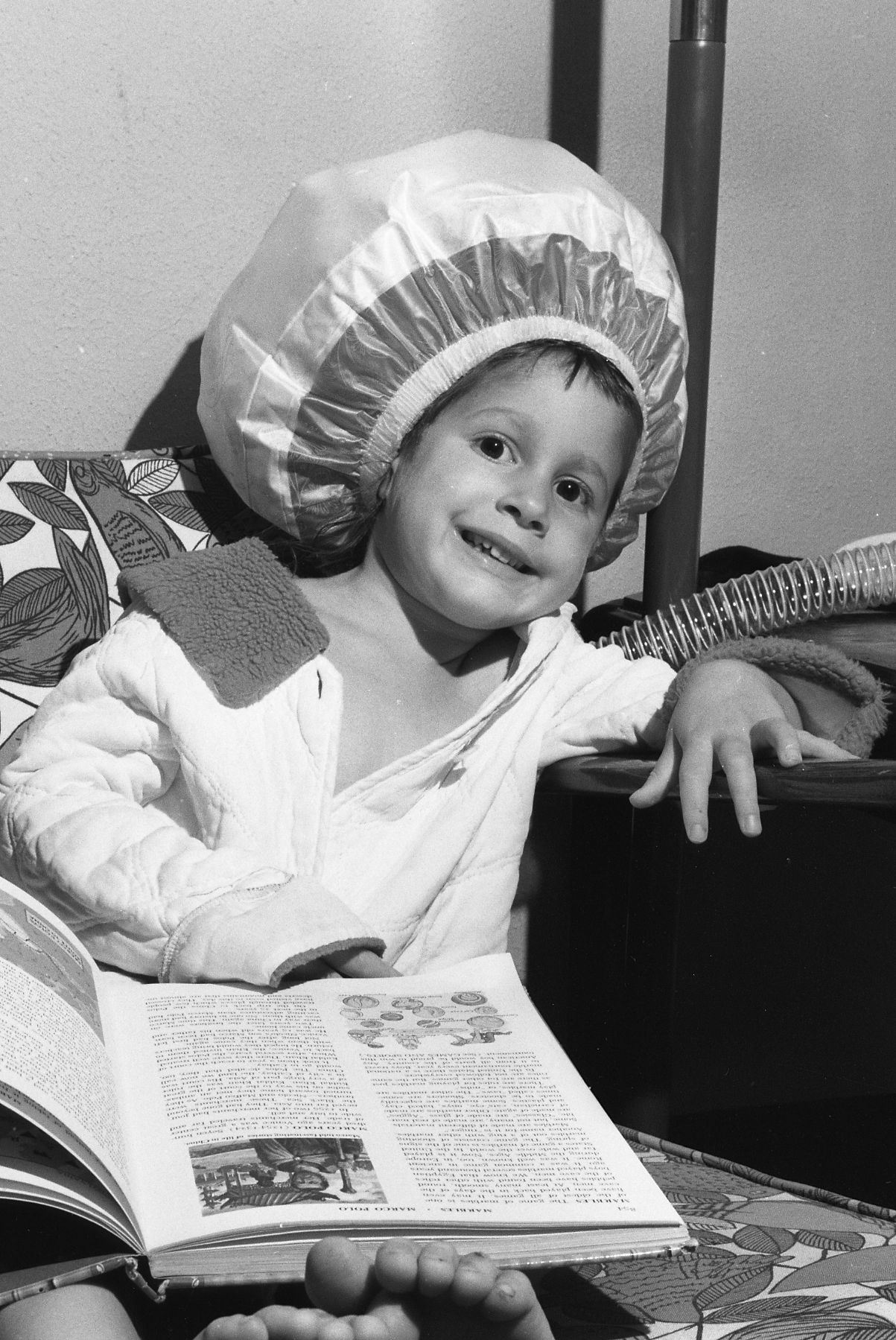
Bonnet hair dryer, 1965

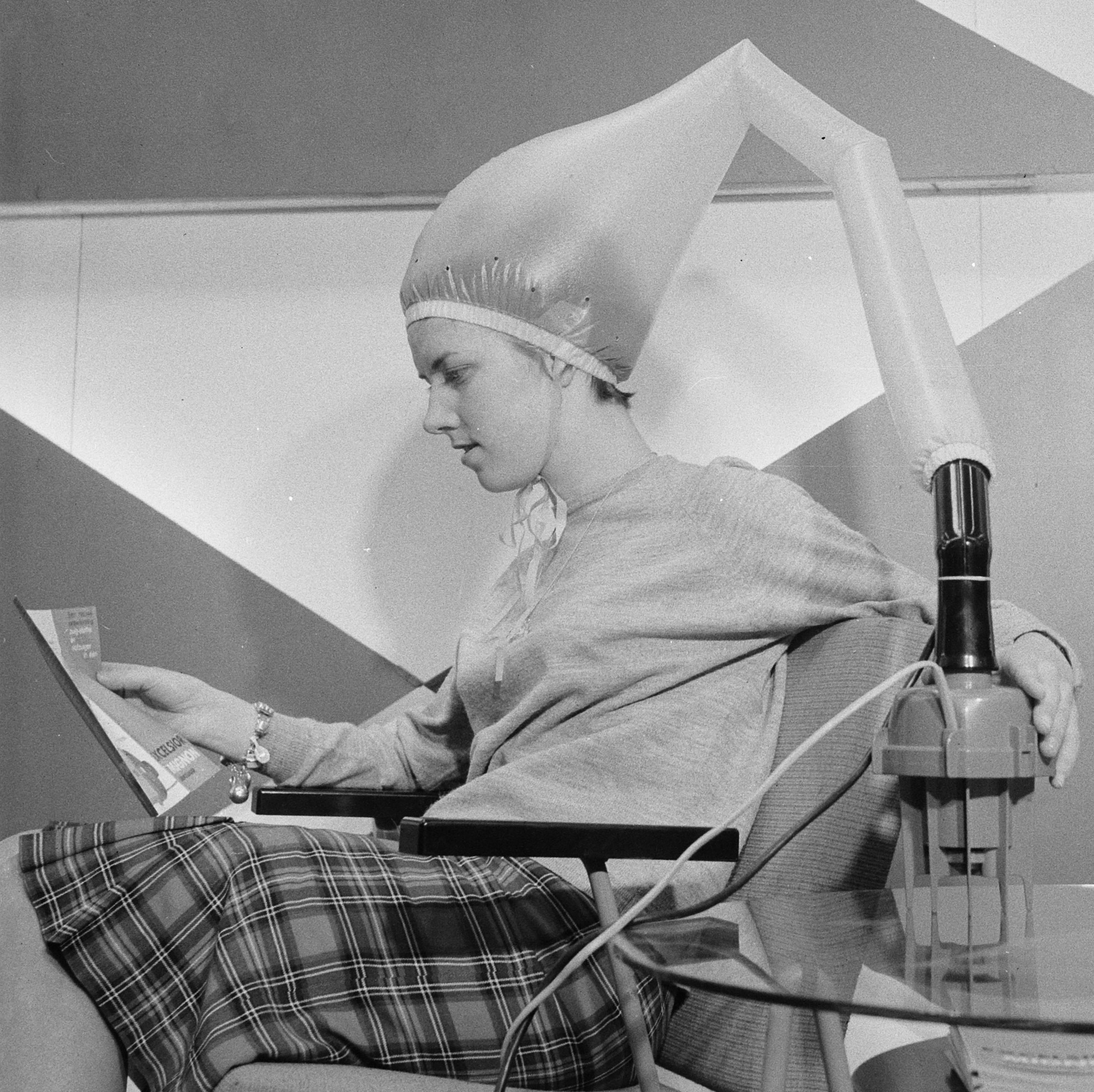
Bonnet hair dryer, 1962

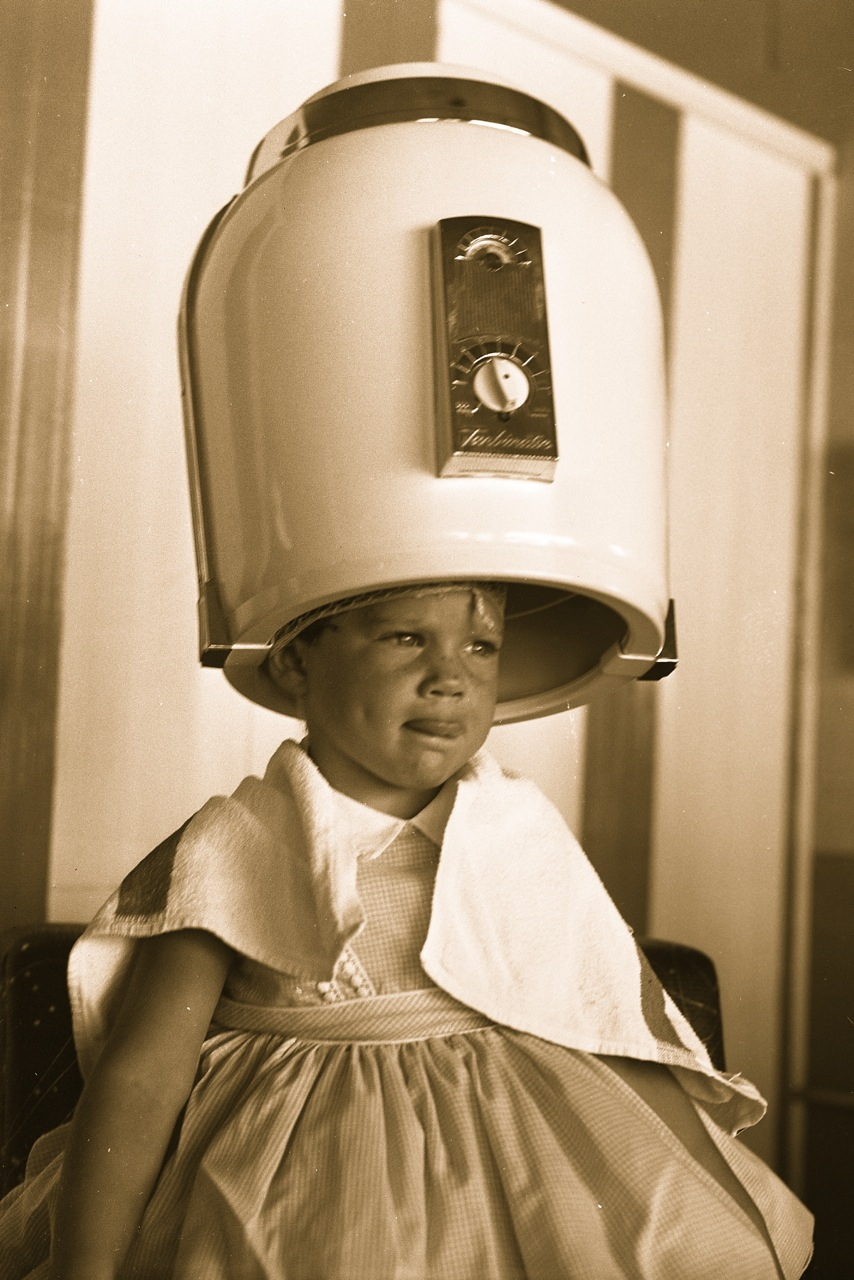
Girl under beauty parlor hair dryer, 1958

== See also ==
- Curling iron
- Heat gun
