= Guido Maus =

Guido Maus (born 5 November 1964 in Malmedy) is a Belgian-born gallery owner, gallerist, curator, and long-time collector of contemporary art. He is currently living and working in Birmingham, Alabama.

== Gallery ==
In early 2010, Maus opened Maus Contemporary dedicated to supporting contemporary creativity across the visual arts in photography, painting, sculpture and works on paper as well as mixed media, with a strong emphasis on issue-driven artwork and committed to experimentation and risk-taking. Through representing emerging, established, and internationally recognized artists, the gallery is committed to bringing a global perspective to contemporary issues and practices across the visual arts. The program consists of exhibitions, print publications, and media outreach.

The gallery represents artists such as Willie Cole, Clayton Colvin, Derek Gracco, Mark Flood, Peter Fox, Irene Grau, Barbara and Michael Leisgen, Sonja Rieger, Leslie Smith III, Susana Solano, Melissa Vandenberg, and the Estate of Yoshishige Furukawa.

Gallery exhibits curated by Maus at Maus Contemporary have been reviewed in many art magazines and art blogs including Artforum, ARTslant, Square Cylinder Northern California Art, and Hyperallergic, among others.
