= Voluntary CQC Mark Certification =

Chinese voluntary product certification

The Voluntary CQC Mark Certification is a voluntary product certification for Chinese products or products that are imported to China. The Voluntary CQC Mark Certification can be applied for products which are not in the China Compulsory Certification product catalogue and thus cannot receive a China Compulsory Certificate (CCC Certificate). The CQC Mark guarantees the conformity of the product with the Chinese standards (Guobiao standards) regarding safety, quality, environmental and energy efficiencies. Products marked with the CQC Mark are less likely to be detained at Chinese customs. In addition, the CQC Mark raises the competitiveness of a product in the Chinese market. The whole certification process is similar to the Compulsory China Certificate (CCC) certification process.

== Administration ==
The Voluntary CQC Mark Certification is conducted by the China Quality Certification Center, the largest professional certification body that is sanctioned by the governmental agency CCIC (China Certification & Inspection Group). The CQC is also responsible for the mandated process for manufacturers to receive their CCC certification. The Voluntary CQC Mark Certification product range covers more than 500 products that do not require a mandatory CCC certification.

== Applicable products ==
The following products can receive a CQC Mark, if they do not require a mandatory CCC certification:

- Electric products and electronic components
- Household electric appliance accessories
- Electrical accessories
- Audio and video apparatus
- Lighting apparatus and tools (lamps and luminaries)
- Power tools
- Small and medium-sized electric machines and accessories
- Medical instruments/Medical devices
- Household and similar electrical appliances
- Machines
- Commercially used machines
- Electric wires and cables
- Low voltage apparatus
- Automotive and motorbike accessories, e.g. tyres
- Glass
- Power system relay protection and automation devices
- Water pumps
- Electric meters
- Low voltage apparatus and accessories
- High voltage equipment and appliances
- Generator sets
- Photovoltaic products
- Motors
- Additional CQC Certification for CCC certified wires and cables
- Test and control instruments
- Earthmoving machineries and accessories
- Electric vehicle charging stations and plugs
- Wind power products
- Thermal energy products
- Construction materials
- Textiles
- Building products
- Sanitary products
- Cement products
- Office equipment
- Surge protection
- Light electric vehicles and accessories
- Electric cars and accessories
- Bearing products
- Restriction of Hazardous Substances (RoHS1 certification)
- Certification for non-metallic materials and parts
- School supplies
- Certification for the restricted use of polycyclic aromatic hydrocarbons (PAHs)
- Accumulators and batteries
- Metal welding, cutting and heat treatment Equipment

== Certification process ==
The certification process is similar to the CCC certification process. With good consultancy, the CQC Mark Certification can be received in 4 months. Self-applicants may take up to 8 months to finish the whole certification procedure. The process includes the following steps:

1. Submission of application documents and supporting materials
2. Type Testing. A CNCA-designated test laboratory in China will test product samples
3. Factory Inspection. CQC will send representatives to inspect the manufacturing facilities
4. Evaluation of the results
5. Approval of the CQC Certificate (or failure and retesting)
6. Receiving the Voluntary CQC Mark Certification
7. Application for Marking Permission at the CNCA
8. Annual Follow-up Factory Inspections by Chinese officials

=== Follow-Up Certification ===
In order to keep the validity of the certification, the CQC certificate and printing permission of the CQC mark must be renewed annually as part of a follow-up certification. Follow-up certifications require a one-day factory inspection. The follow-up procedure is much shorter than the initial certification process. Moreover, it is associated with lower costs.

== Charges ==
Depending on the product, the fee charging for the CQC Mark Certification can vary. The following list gives an overview about the costs:

- Submission fees and administrative charge
- Charge for type testings in China
- Factory inspection fees
- Travel expenses of the Chinese officials that will be sent to inspect the factory
- Charges for application of Marking Permission at the CNCA

Additional costs:

- Translator/interpreter fees
- Product costs for type testings
- shipping/mail costs
- Additional fees when type testings are not successful
- Costs for optional change/extension of certificate (much lower than initial certification)

== Benefits of a Voluntary CQC Mark Certification ==
Products marked with a CQC Mark enjoy high reputation on the Chinese market. It shows that the product conforms the requirements of the Chinese standards in regard to safety, quality, environment and performance. It will highly increase the product's competitiveness in the Chinese and international market, and as well facilitates a smoother access of foreign enterprises’ products into the domestic market. The official China Compulsory Certificate product catalogue is constantly going to be extended. This means that a product that did not require the mandatory CCC Certificate before can fall under the new product range. The Voluntary CQC Mark Certification can be relatively easily changed into a mandatory CCC Certificate which gives the manufacturer huge advantages ahead to his competitors.

== See also ==
- Common Criteria
- National Development and Reform Commission
- Guobiao standards

== General references ==
- "A Brief Guide to CCC: China Compulsory Certification", Julian Busch, ISBN 978-1484115534
- Official CQC website
- CNCA website
