= Lesney Products =

British manufacturing company

Lesney Products & Co. Ltd.
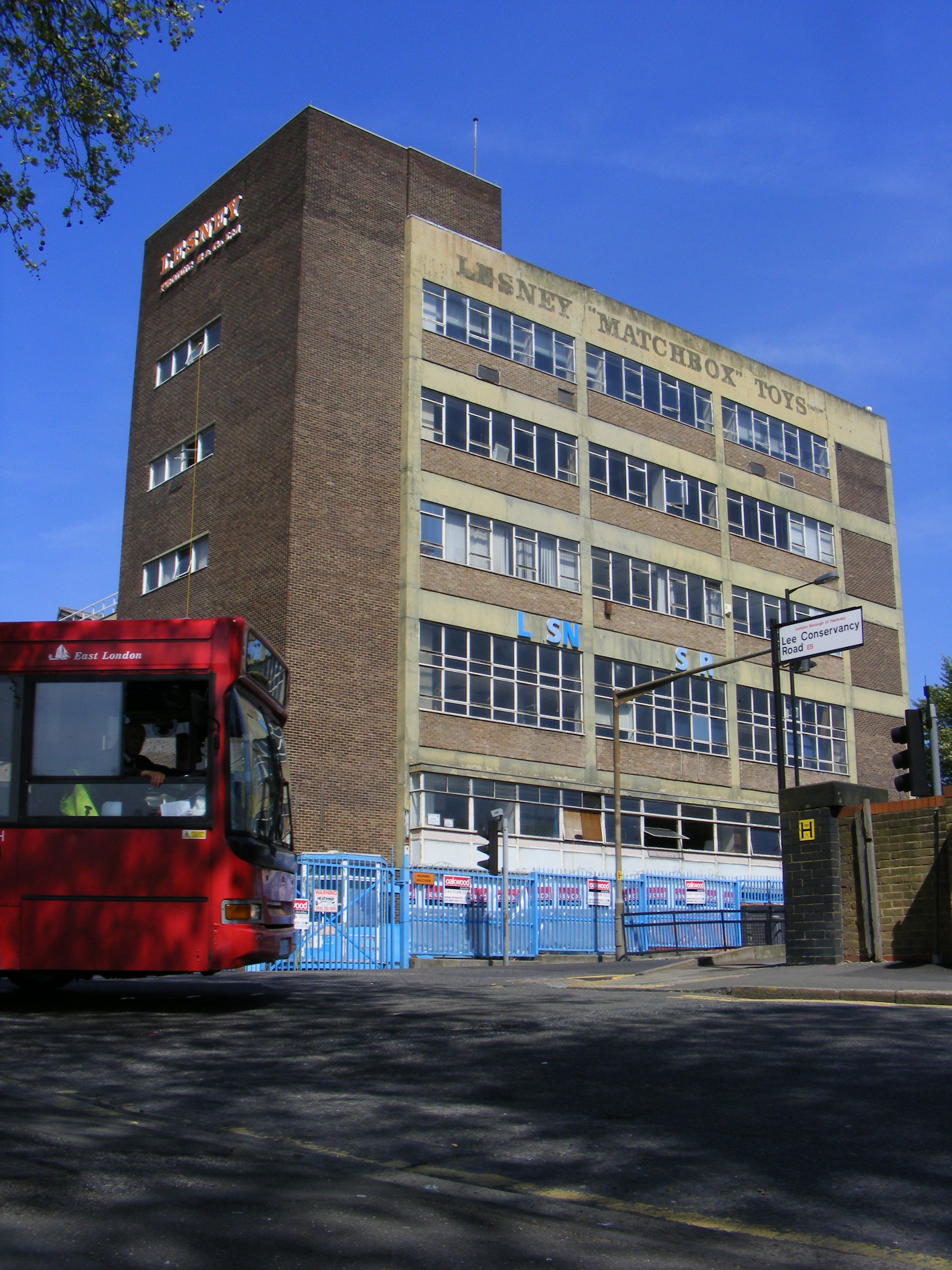
- Former "Lesney Matchbox Toys" factory pictured in 2009
- Industry: Toy
- Founded: 1947
- Founder: Leslie Smith; Rodney Smith
- Defunct: 1982; 44 years ago
- Fate: Company defunct, Matchbox brand remained after being acquired by Universal Toys
- Headquarters: United Kingdom
- Area served: Worldwide
- Products: Die-cast cars, commercial vehicles
- Brands: Matchbox

Lesney Products & Co. Ltd. was a British manufacturing company responsible for the conception, manufacture, and distribution of die-cast toys under the "Matchbox" name. The company existed from 1947 until 1982.

== History ==
Lesney was founded on 19 January 1947 as an industrial die-casting company by Leslie Smith (6 March 1918 – 26 May 2005) and Rodney Smith (26 August 1917 – 20 July 2013). The name "Lesney" was a portmanteau from both partners' (who were not related by blood) names. They had been school friends and served together in the Royal Navy during World War II. Shortly after they founded the company, Rodney Smith introduced to his partner a man named John "Jack" Odell, an engineer he had met in a previous job at D.C.M.T. (another die-casting company). Odell initially rented a space in the Lesney building to make his own die-casting products, but he joined the company as a partner in that same year.

Lesney originally started operations in a derelict pub in north London (The Rifleman), but later, as finances allowed, changed location several times before finally moving to a factory in Hackney which became synonymous with the company. In late 1947 they received a request for parts for a toy gun. As that proved to be a viable alternative to reducing their factory's output during periods in which they received fewer or smaller industrial orders, they started making die-cast model toys the following year. Seeing no future for the company, Rodney Smith left in 1951.

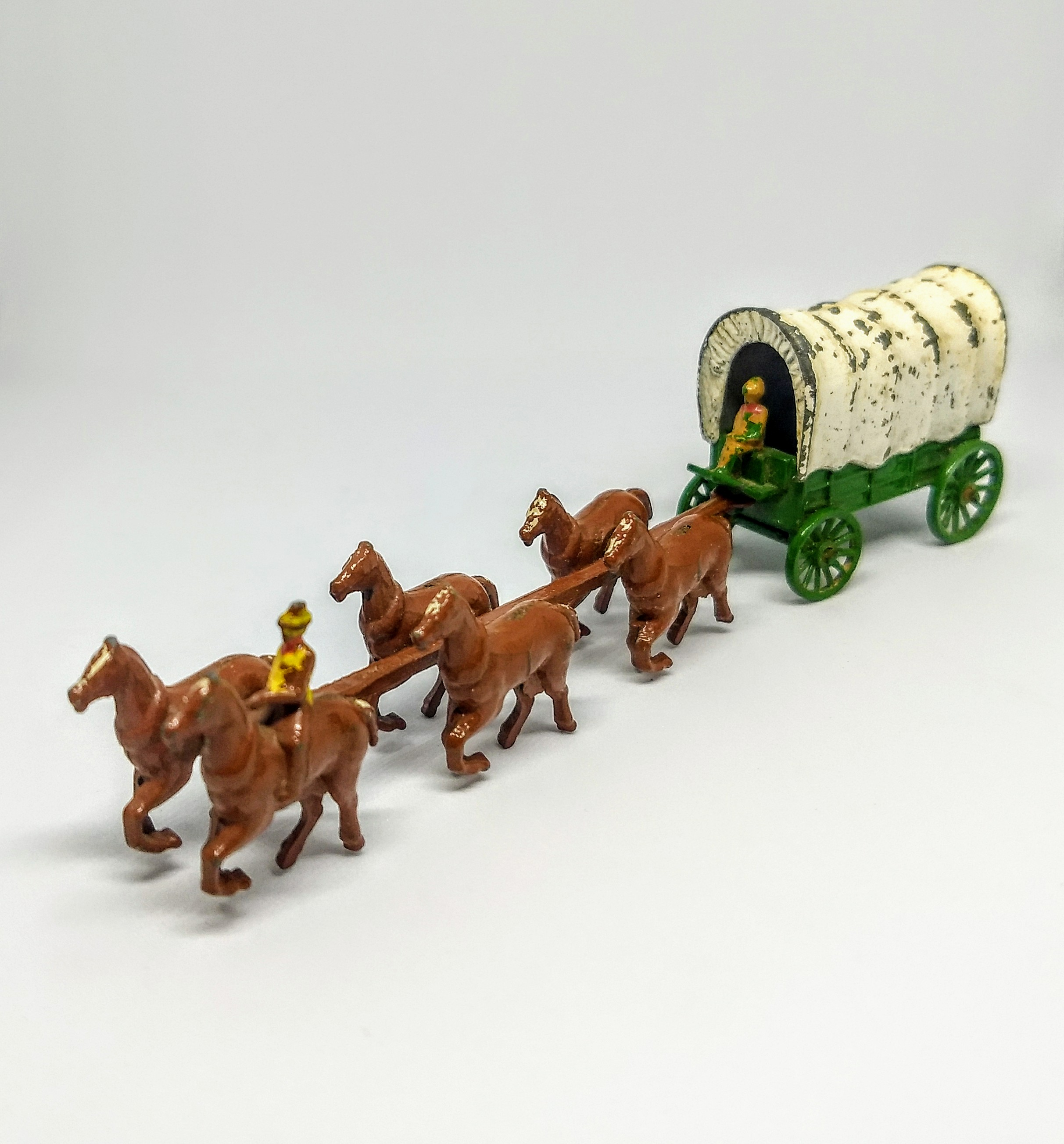
Conestoga Wagon by Lesney

The first model toy they produced in 1948; a die-cast road roller based clearly on a Dinky model (the industry leader in die-cast toy cars at that time); in hindsight proves to be the first of perhaps three major milestones on the path to their eventual destiny. It established transportation as a viable and interesting theme; other similar models followed, including a cowboy-influenced covered wagon and a soap-box racer. The company continued to produce non-toy items; of those marketed directly by Lesney, one of the more popular ones was a fishing bait press, well liked by British anglers at the time.

The next crucial milestone was the production of a replica of the Royal State Coach in 1953, the year of the coronation of Queen Elizabeth II. Two versions were created, the first in a larger scale, followed by a smaller-scale model. It was this second model that sold over a million units, a massive success at the time. The profits from the sales provided valuable capital for further investments.

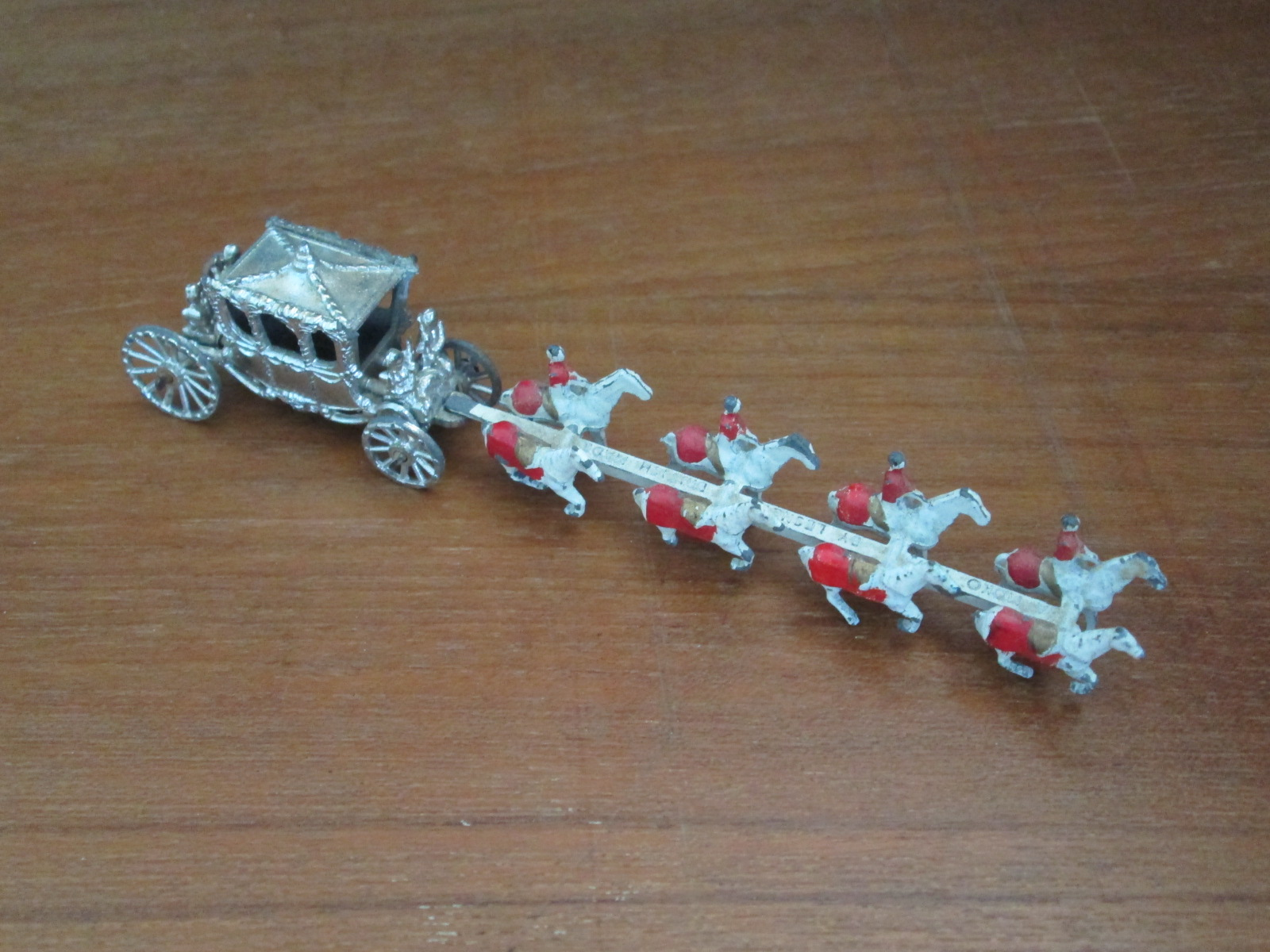
Royal State Coach (small scale) by Lesney

The final and decisive stepping stone in the pre-Matchbox era was a toy which Odell designed for his daughter Annie: a scaled-down version of the Lesney green and red road roller. The toy's origin is debatable; it's been said that the daughter's school only allowed children to bring toys that could fit inside a matchbox, but Nick Jones debunks this story in his book, Matchbox Toys. According to the book, Annie "kept bringing home spiders and creepy-crawlies inside a matchbox", so Odell promised to make her a toy that fit in the matchbox if she didn't bring any more spiders home. Odell then made her a scaled-down Road Roller, which became popular at her school. The idea was then born to sell the model in a replica matchbox – thus also yielding the name of the series which would propel Lesney to worldwide, mass-market success. The road roller ultimately became the first of the Matchbox 1-75 miniature range; a dump truck, a cement mixer, and a Massey Harris Tractor (labelled 1a, 2a, 3a, and 4a respectively) completed the original four-model release.

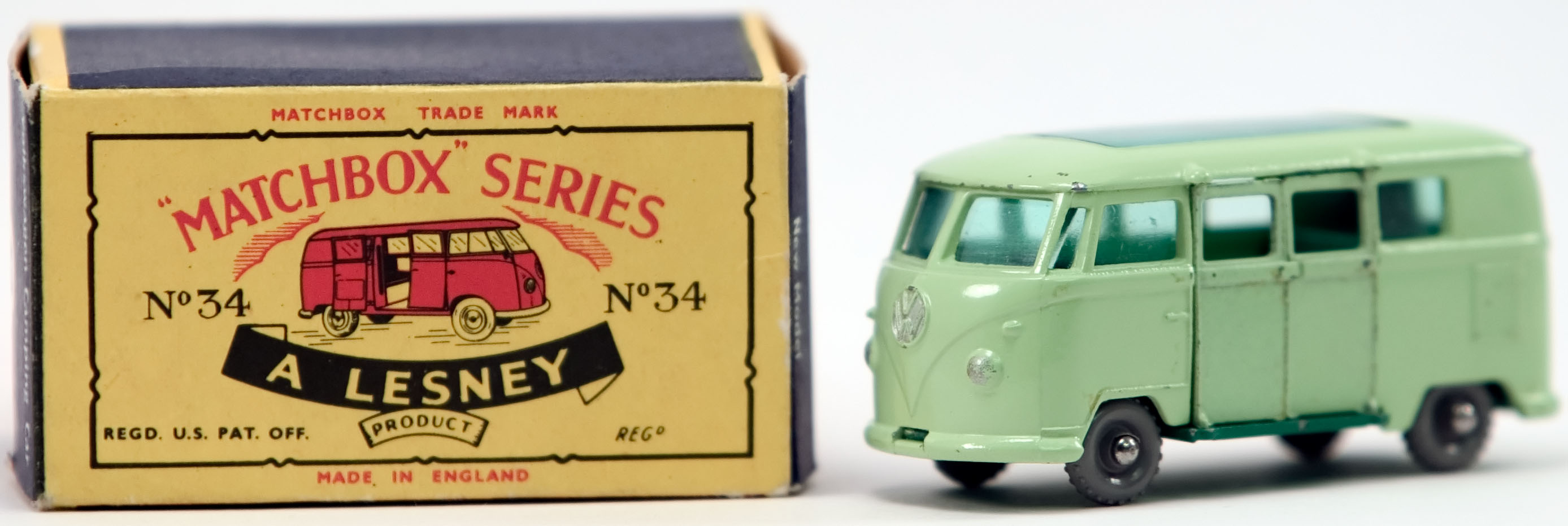
A Matchbox Volkswagen Camper Van

In the early years of the series, Lesney used a partner company, "Moko" (itself also named after its founder, Moses Kohnstam), to market/distribute its toys. This distribution was documented on the boxes themselves, on which the text "A Moko Lesney product" appeared. By the end of the decade, Lesney was able to buy Moko, marketing its products under its own name from that point on. A period of great expansion, tremendous profit, and recognition followed: In 1966, Lesney received their first (of several) Queen's Awards for Industry. By the mid-'60s, Matchbox was the largest brand of die-cast model vehicles in the world, and had diversified the line into multiple series.

On 11 July 1982, after years of difficulties due to the economic climate in Britain at the time, Lesney went bankrupt and into receivership. Meccano Ltd (maker of the Dinky cars) had gone bankrupt in 1964 and Mettoy-Corgi (maker of Corgi Classics) would go bankrupt in 2008. The Matchbox brand as well as Lesney's tooling were bought by and became a division of Universal Holdings/Universal Toys, where the company re-formed as "Matchbox International Ltd." Tooling and production were moved from Britain to China, at Macau. Jack Odell went on to form a new company, Lledo, where he produced models similar to early Matchbox Models of Yesteryear. Since 1997 the Matchbox brand has been owned by Mattel, creators of Hot Wheels.

Some of the tools and dies created in the Lesney era were still used in the Matchbox line of 2007.

== Non-Matchbox Lesney toys ==
Although the name Lesney became synonymous with Matchbox, the company produced several toys previous to and into the Matchbox era which were not sold under that famous moniker. Today, these are highly collectible items. They include:

- Road Roller (1947), later scaled down to become Matchbox no. 1 (Note: The first release under the Matchbox name included three models, two of which (nos. 1 and 3) were based on larger Lesney toys as described above. The third model, the no. 2 Dump Truck, was actually a scaled-down version of a competitor's model, the original having been manufactured by Condon Products Ltd.)
- Cement Mixer (1948), later scaled down to become Matchbox no. 3
- Caterpillar Crawler (1948), later scaled down to become Matchbox no. 8
- Caterpillar Bulldozer (1948), later scaled down to become Matchbox no. 18
- Milk Float (1949), later scaled down to become Matchbox no. 7; this was the 1st toy made in Lesney's second factory at Barratts Grove
- Soap-Box Racer (1949)
- Rag & Bone Cart (1949)
- Prime Mover & Trailer (1950), used in different scales later as Matchbox 1-75 and Major Pack models
- Jumbo the Elephant (1950), a clockwork toy (marketed by Moko)
- Muffin the Mule (1951), a puppet animal based on a TV show (marketed by Moko)
- large Royal State Coach (1951 & 1952); the 1st version included figures of king and queen; the horses were cast by competing company Benbros
- small Royal State Coach [Coronation Coach] (1953), first big seller, provided capital for further ventures
- Massey-Harris Tractor (1954), perhaps the finest Lesney toy, later scaled down to become Matchbox no. 4
- Conestoga Covered Wagon (1954)
