= Lesley Smith =

Lesley Smith may refer to:

- Lesley Smith (historian) (born 1957), English actress and curator
- Lesley Smith (diver) (born 1957), Zimbabwean diver
- Lesley Smith (politician)

== See also ==
- Les Smith (disambiguation)
- Leslie Smith (disambiguation) for the male spelling of the name
- Leslee Smith, basketball player
