= Leslie Smith III =

American artist

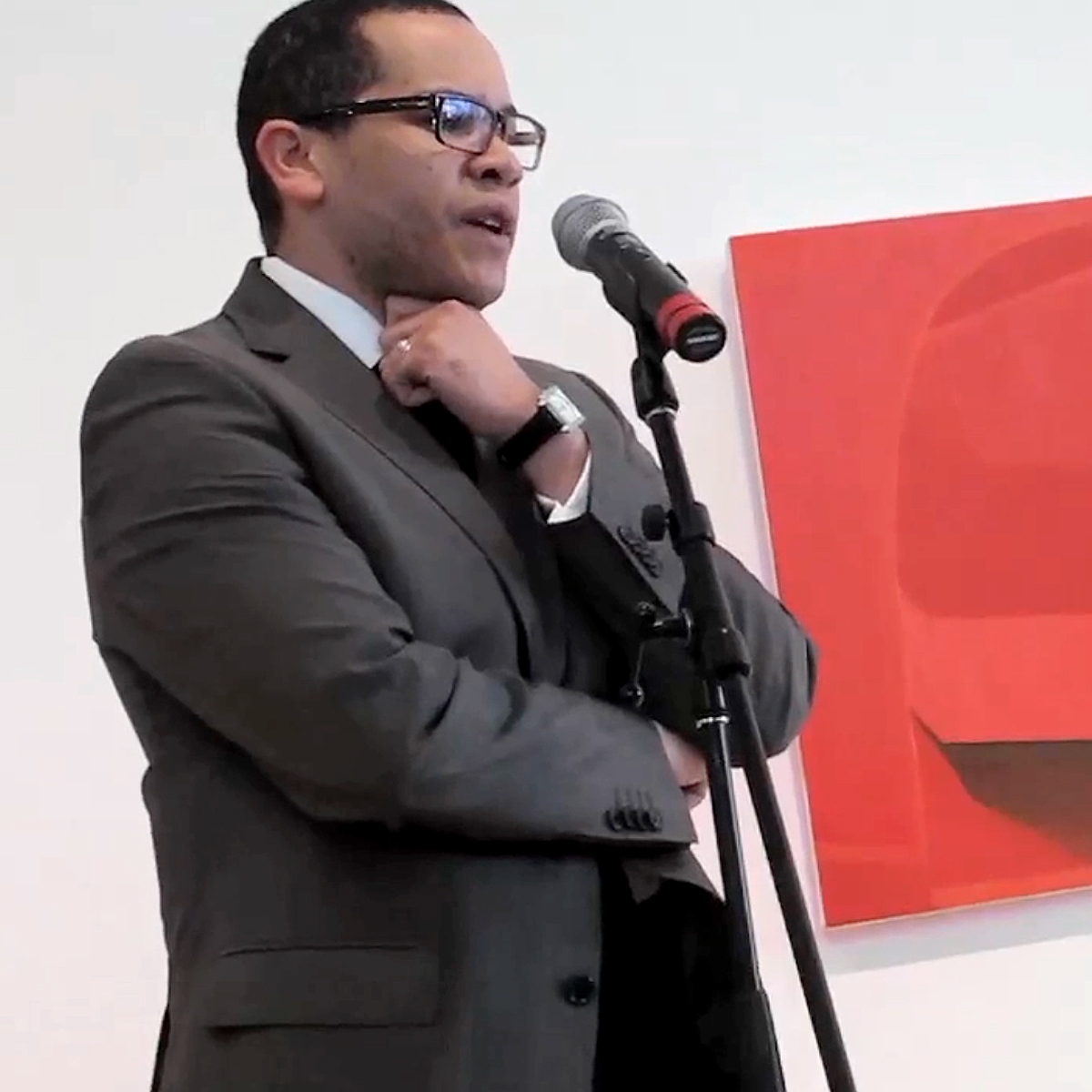
- Leslie Smith III gives an art talk
- Born: Silver Spring, Maryland
- Education: B.F.A., Maryland Institute College of Art & M.F.A., Yale University
- Known for: painting

Leslie Smith III (born 1985 in Silver Spring, Maryland) is a contemporary African American visual artist. He currently lives and works in Madison, Wisconsin.

== Life ==
Smith grew up in Silver Spring, Maryland, in metropolitan Washington, D.C. and graduated with a Bachelor of Fine Arts degree in painting from the Maryland Institute College of Art (MICA) in Baltimore, Maryland in 2007. He obtained a Master of Fine Arts (MFA) degree in Painting and Printmaking from Yale University in New Haven, Connecticut in 2009. He is currently an associate professor of Drawing and Painting at the University of Wisconsin–Madison in Madison, Wisconsin.

== Art ==
Leslie Smith III is an oil painter best known for his abstractions painted on shaped canvases. He engages in an expressionist-based practice, activating his canvases with bold color, gestural brushstrokes, and narratives that insinuate discord. Inspired by personal narrative and day-to-day interpersonal relationships, his paintings concentrate on employing abstraction to communicate the poetics of the human experience.

Smith has exhibited at many museums including the Madison Museum of Contemporary Art (MMoCA) in Madison, Wisconsin; the Wriston Art Galleries, Lawrence University, in Appleton, Wisconsin; the Milwaukee Art Museum in Milwaukee, Wisconsin; the Contemporary Arts Museum Houston in Houston, Texas; the Yale School of Art; the Gormley gallery of Notre Dame of Maryland University; and the Baltimore Museum of Art in Baltimore, Maryland, among others. He is the recipient of many awards, including an American Academy in Rome summer fellowship and an Al Held Affiliate Residency Fellowship in Rome, Italy in 2009.

He is represented by Guido Maus, beta pictoris gallery / Maus Contemporary in Birmingham, AL. and by Galerie Isabelle Gounod in Paris, France.
