= Leslie M. Smith =

American applied mathematician, mechanical engineer

Leslie Smith
- Born: Leslie Morgan Smith; August 15, 1961 (age 65)

Academic background
- Education: Harvard University (AB); Massachusetts Institute of Technology (PhD)
- Thesis: An upper bound with correct scaling laws for turbulent shear flows (1989)
- Doctoral advisor: Willem Malkus

Academic work
- Discipline: Mathematics; Engineering; Physics
- Sub-discipline: Mechanical engineering Fluid dynamics Engineering physics
- Institutions: Yale University; University of Wisconsin–Madison

Leslie Morgan Smith (born August 15, 1961) is an American applied mathematician, mechanical engineer, and engineering physicist whose research focuses on fluid dynamics and turbulence. She is a professor of mathematics and of engineering physics at the University of Wisconsin.

== Education ==
Smith graduated cum laude with a bachelor's degree in physics from Harvard University in 1983. She completed her Ph.D. in applied mathematics at the Massachusetts Institute of Technology in 1988. Her dissertation, An upper bound with correct scaling laws for turbulent shear flows, was supervised by Willem Malkus.

== Career ==
After postdoctoral research at Stanford University, the Université libre de Bruxelles, and Princeton University, she became an assistant professor of mechanical engineering at Yale University in 1993, and moved to the University of Wisconsin–Madison in 1998, jointly affiliated with the departments of mathematics and mechanical engineering. In 2002 she was promoted to full professor, and moved from mechanical engineering to engineering physics. She served as chair of mathematics from 2005 to 2008, and again 2012 to 2014, becoming the first female chair of the department.

== Recognition ==
Smith was named a Fellow of the American Physical Society in 2008 "for important and insightful contributions to the understanding of turbulence in engineering and geophysical flows through theory and numerical simulations". She was named a Fellow of the American Mathematical Society, in the 2022 class of fellows, "for contributions to applied mathematics and particularly fluid mechanics".
