= Lledo =

British car manufacturing company

- Founded: 1982
- Founder: Jack Odell; Bert Russell
- Defunct: 1999; 27 years ago
- Fate: bankruptcy, rights to brand acquired by Corgi Classics
- Headquarters: Enfield, U.K.
- Products: Die-cast scale model commercial vehicles, cars

Lledo was a British manufacturing company founded in 1982 by Matchbox co-founder Jack Odell, and Bert Russell, and based in Enfield. The factory produced mainly die-cast scale model commercial vehicles, and also cars, from 1983 to 1999, when the company went into bankruptcy.

Models were later made in China. "Lledo" was a reversal of Odell's own surname, a mnemonic device from war days in the African desert so as not to forget his wireless call sign.

== History ==
=== Days Gone ===
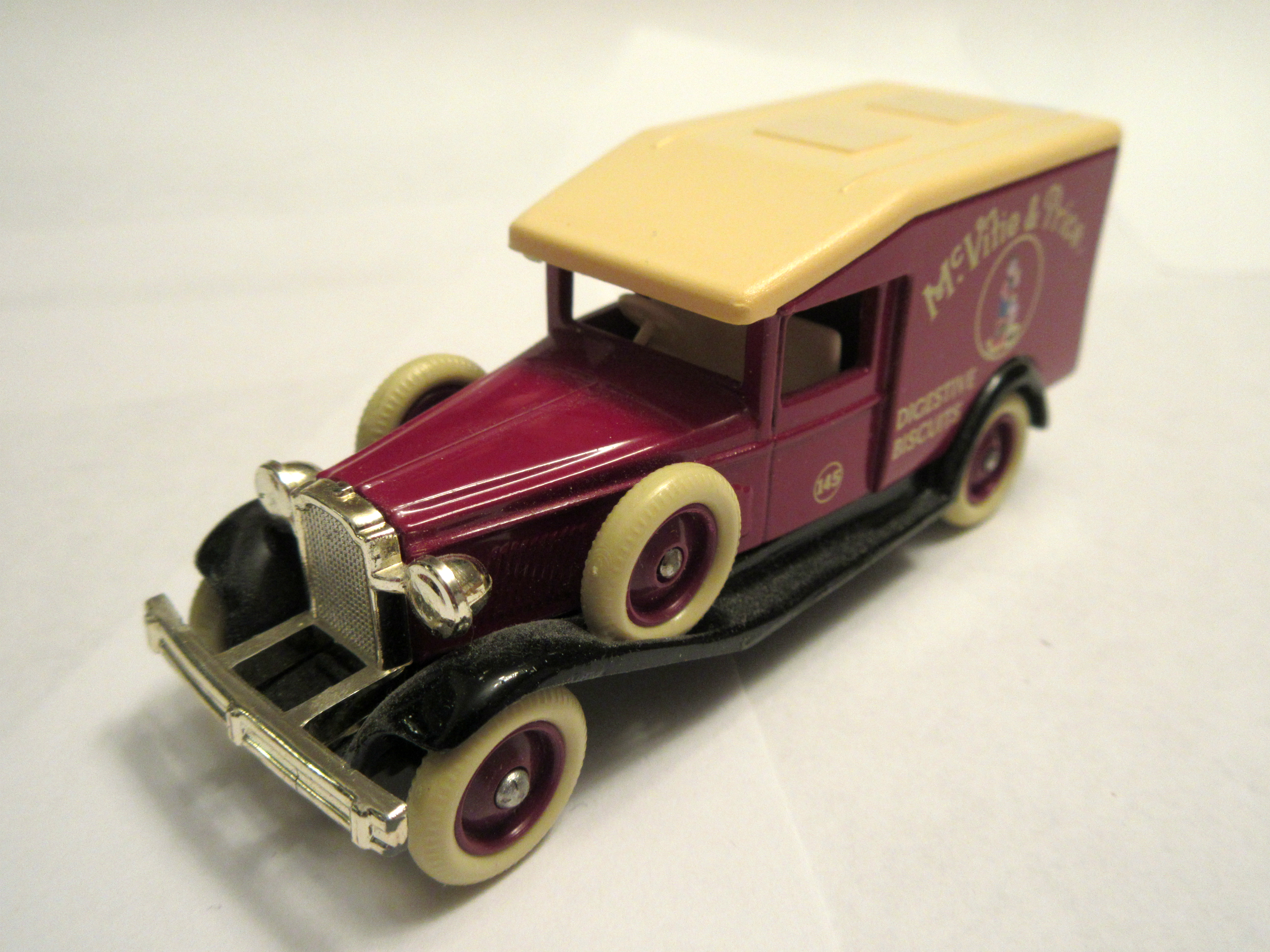
936 Packard - McVitie and Price of the "Days Gone" series

Lledo set out to specialise in replicating early Matchbox series styles, particularly the Models of Yesteryear range. Odell and Russell bought machinery from the Universal company, which had purchased the Matchbox plant and shipped it to Macau. The tooling they purchased was re-shipped back to Enfield, England where in April 1983 the new "Days Gone" range was launched. The name is a nice continuation of Matchbox's nostalgic "Yesteryear" theme.

The first Lledo models appeared on the market in early 1983. These were a horse-drawn tram, a horse-drawn milk float, a horse-drawn delivery van, a stagecoach-like omnibus and a horse-drawn fire engine. One of the more popular models was the Ford Model T van introduced later in the year.

=== Lledo promotionals ===
The promotional market became Lledo's bread and butter, and the aim was to provide variations to be offered for different businesses. Of the hundreds of Lledo variations appearing in the first six years of production, all were based on only thirty basic castings.

The Model T, especially, became the basis for a series of limited edition models for gifts and promotions. Different from the original Matchbox Models of Yesteryear line, there were only a selection of basic castings which were commonly produced in limited edition promotion runs of 500 or 1000 models. For example, the basic Model T delivery van was produced in more than 170 different liveries. Meanwhile, the horse-drawn vehicles were produced less and less, the last one appearing in 1984. The London Double Decker bus was a popular promotional; it appeared in many forms like "Vimto-Keeps you Fit", "Madame Tassaud's Wax Museum", or the "Boys Brigade" model whose intent was to raise funds to provide safe drinking water for third world countries. Another promotional example was the VW Transporter van which appeared in Pepsi, 7 Up and Bosch spark plugs liveries, amongst many others. Two of the most popular promotional models were special runs for Southern Vectis and Darlington Corporation.

To distinguish promos from traditional "Days Gone" series models, model baseplates were differentiated. Either "Days Gone" or "Lledo Promotional Model" began to appear on the chassis, according to need. Most models were produced by Lledo, but several 'Code Two' models were manufactured and sold to second parties for label and logo application previously agreed to by Lledo.

== Other lines ==
=== Foreign marketers ===
Some Lledos were sold in the U.S. under the Hartoys name, headquartered in Florida, and mainly selling a series of trucks to be sold in supermarkets and drug stores. One of these Hartoys lines was called the "Fantastic Set o' Wheels". Perhaps because of the diecast expense, these did not last long and did not become popular, despite fine craftsmanship and notable brand liveries. By the early 1990s, Hartoys was using Chinese diecasters to continue to make models, now called the "American Highway Legends" (AHL). One example was the 1939 International A&P truck. Other Lledos were marketed in the Netherlands under the Edocar name.

=== Land speed record ===
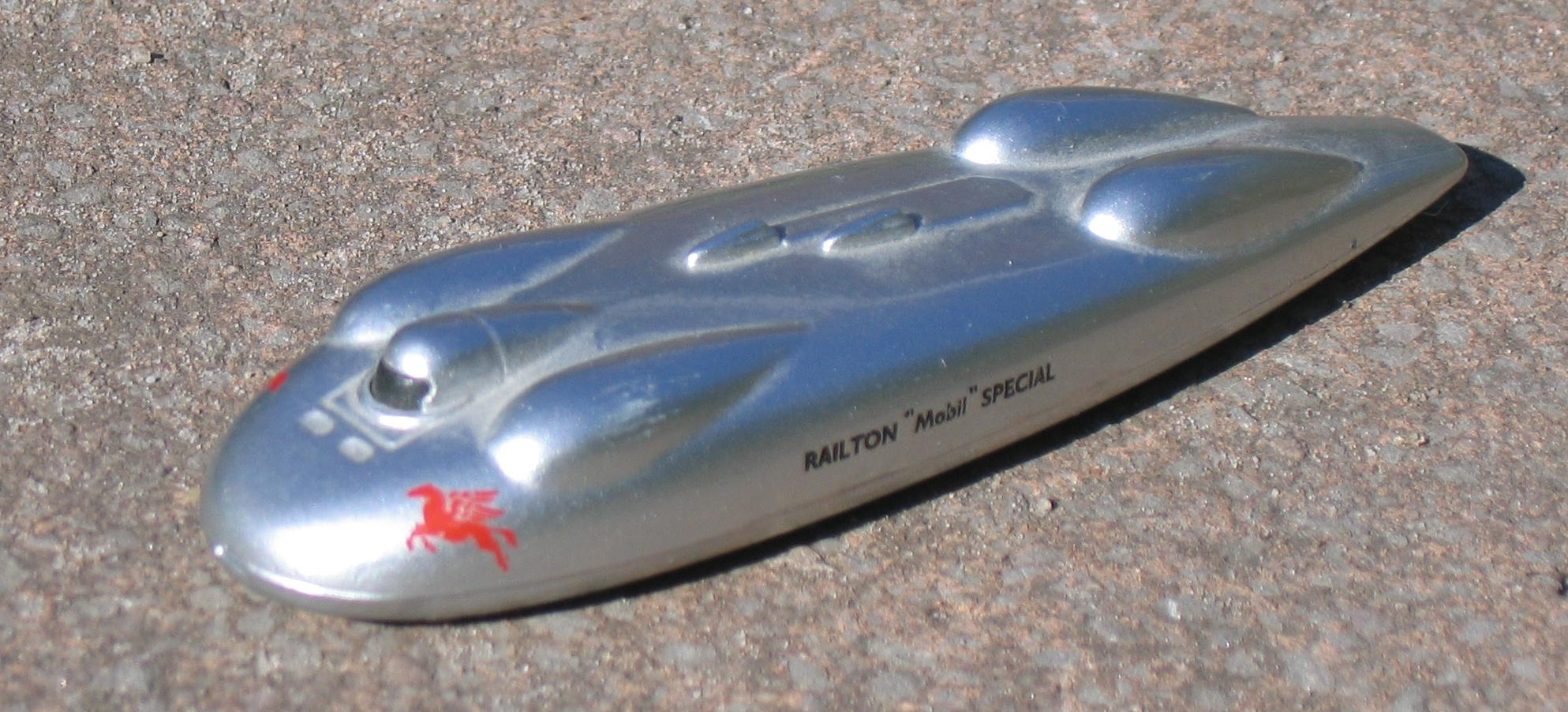
John Cobb's 'Railton Mobil Special'

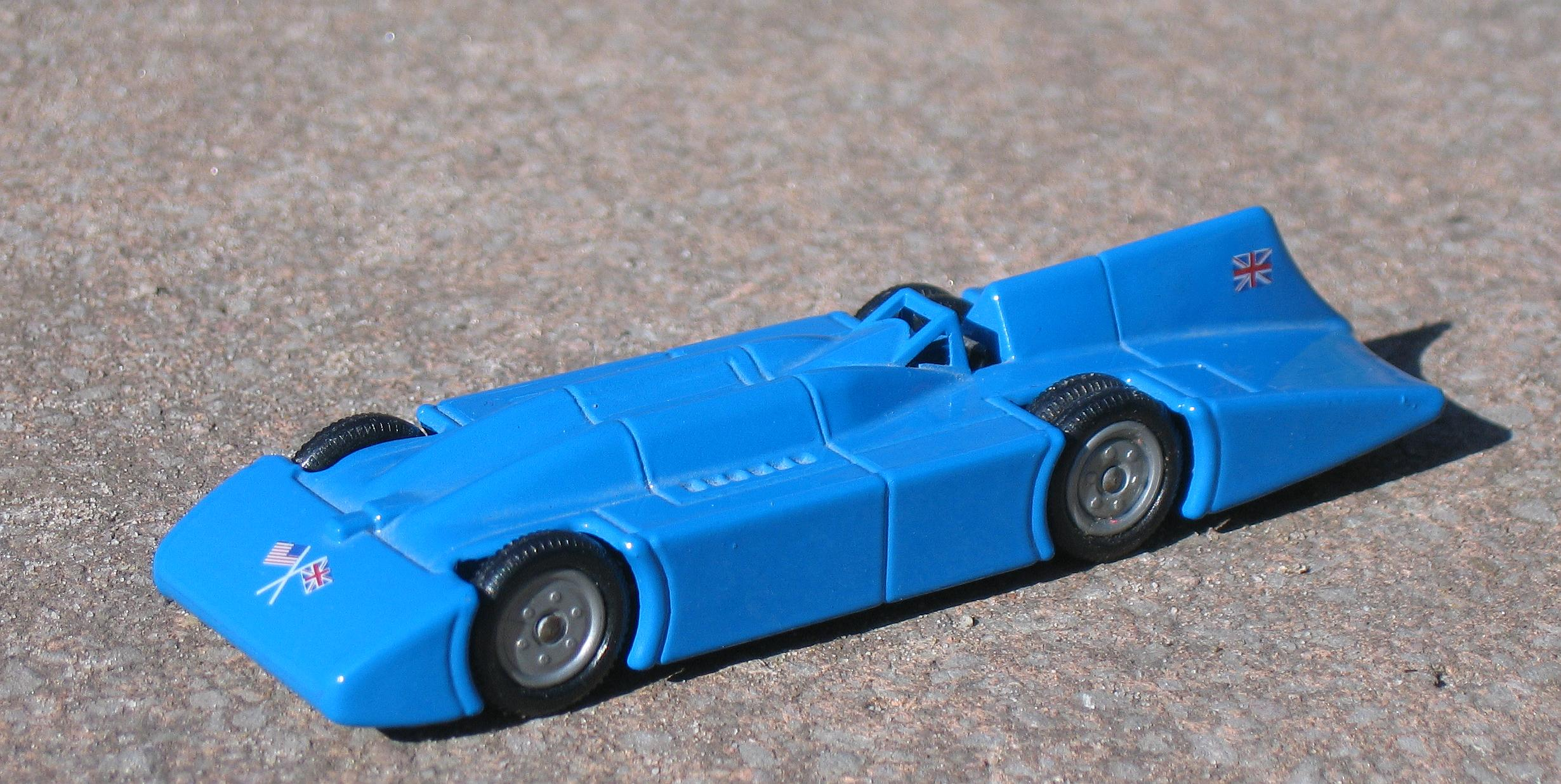
1935 Blue Bird land speed record car

In 1993, Lledo partnered with Kellogg's cereals in the UK to produce a set of four land speed record cars. Called "Land Speed Legends", the vehicles included the 1935 Sir Malcolm Campbell-Railton Blue Bird (the first car to break 300 miles per hour); the Railton Mobil Special driven by John Cobb; Craig Breedlove's second Spirit of America, and Richard Noble's Thrust 2 which held the Land Speed Record from 1983 to 1997.

These models were a big departure from the multiple-livery classic vehicle fare that Lledo normally made – they were entirely new castings and were not subsequently reproduced in any other promotional form. The models were in varied scales from 1:80 to 1:100 (the real cars were very large). The promotion packed all four models together and included a foldout poster of specifications and land speed record events. Though Lledo also made a fifth land speed record car replica of the record-breaking Thrust SSC piloted by Andy Green, the company did not often return to such deviations from its 'liveried classics' format.

== Vanguards ==
Lledo launched the Vanguards range in 1996, which specialized in replica classic British cars, and later, other European vehicles. The first model was the fourth update of the Ford Anglia (1959–1968). With Hillmans, Jowetts, Wolseleys, Rovers, Triumphs, Vauxhalls, Austins, Morrises and Jaguars, many traditional British marques were represented and the range grew to more than 40 different vehicles.

The Vanguards line, often called the "Fifties and Sixties Classic Collection" was notable for keen attention to detail. For example, the handsome Sunbeam Alpine Mark II featured accurate decals for logos and scripts on the body of the car, chrome petrol cap, door handles and trunk hinges. Body coloured rims with whitewall tyres added to the sophistication of the finished model. Rear view mirror and accurate windscreen wipers were also offered. Like many Lledo models, the Alpine came with rear view mirrors separate that could then be fixed to the car.

British trucks were also produced including Ford Transit vans and Ford Thames Trader truck, Commer dropside, Morris commercial van, Dennis F8 fire engine, Bedford S Type trucks, Land Rover LWB and Defender and Karrier boxback, among others. Later, the Volkswagen Transporter van was included in many different liveries – for example in bright yellow with the Bosch Auto Electrical logo. Vanguards were a departure from earlier Lledos, as they were produced in a consistent 1:43 scale.

== Company fate ==
Although shipping high volumes of product, the company could not compete against low cost producers from Hong Kong and China who also entered the special promotions market with high quality products. As a result, Lledo went bankrupt in 1999, and the naming rights and model range were bought by Corgi Classics which continued producing Lledo models in China until 2005, when the remaining models were merged into the Corgi Classics range.

Jack Odell died on 8 July 2007 at the age of 87.
