= Catoctin Quaker Camp =

Coordinates: 39°34′48″N 77°29′56″W

Catoctin Quaker Camp (CQC) is a Quaker residential-wilderness summer camp located near Frederick, Maryland, operated by Baltimore Yearly Meeting. It welcomes both Quaker and non-Quaker children between the ages of 9 and 14, organizing them into "units" based on their age. These units consist of groups of campers who share cabins and participate in trips together.

During their two to four weeks at camp, children are immersed in the teachings of Quaker values such as simplicity, equality, and peace. They also experience the benefits of living within an intentional, child-centered, and loving community.

Each session at Catoctin Quaker Camp consists of eight days spent in-camp, complemented by two three-day trips. These trips offer exciting outdoor experiences such as canoeing, backpacking, rock climbing, tubing, and various other activities. Additionally, the oldest campers embark on a special ten-day trip known as "The Ten Day," which takes them on a journey through the mountains of Maryland, Virginia, Pennsylvania, and West Virginia.

Within the campgrounds, campers engage in a wide range of activities. They can swim in the lagoon, fondly referred to as the "goon," participate in arts and crafts, take part in chores, play games and sports, gather for Quaker worship at the fire circle, engage in singing, and explore other artistic pursuits.

The camp property, owned by Baltimore Yearly Meeting since 1953, is protected by a conservation easement with the state of Maryland. It serves as a habitat for several rare plant species and showcases geological rarities, including the presence of Catoctin Greenstone, which can be observed in the walls of the main lodge. The main lodge itself features large preserved beams and rafters crafted from American Chestnut trunks that were formed prior to the devastation caused by the chestnut blight. The camp is currently working on communication with the indigenous people that lived on the land the camp now dwells on.
