= Global Electronics Council =

American non-profit organization

- Formation: 2005
- Type: Non-Profit
- Purpose: Environmental
- Headquarters: Portland, Oregon, United States
- Chief Executive Officer: Richard Crespin
- Chair (Board of Directors): Trisa Thompson
- Staff: 21
- Website: https://globalelectronicscouncil.org/

Founded in 2005, the Global Electronics Council (GEC), formerly known as the Green Electronics Council, is a US-based environmental non-profit organization and mission to, "create a world where only sustainable technology is bought and sold".

== EPEAT ==
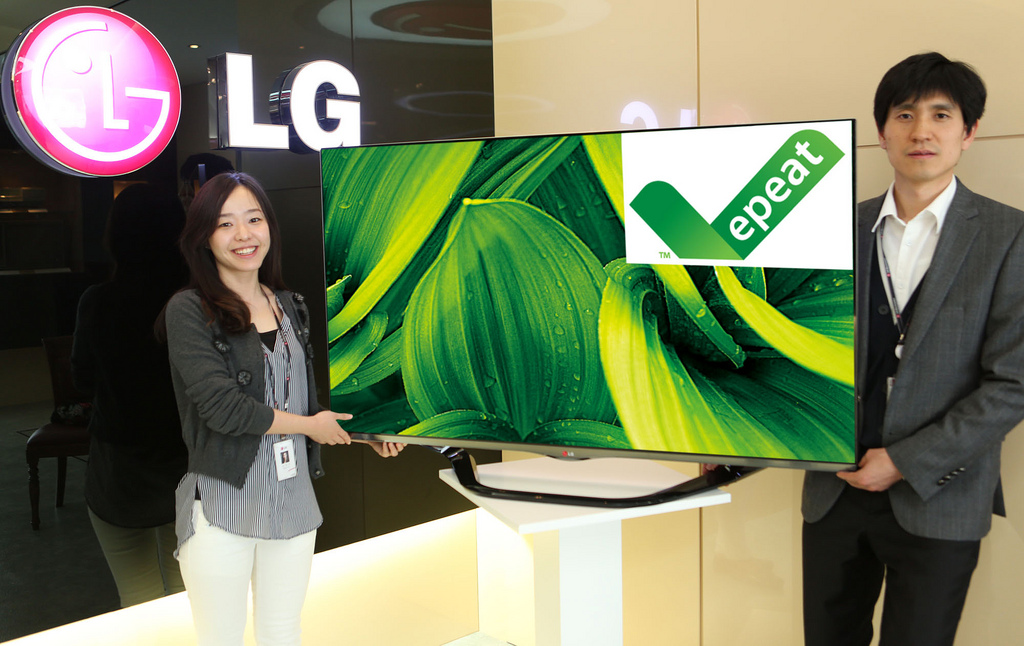

GEC operates the Electronic Product Environmental Assessment Tool (EPEAT) system, which was designed to assist in the purchasing of "greener" PCs and displays, imaging equipment and televisions. The EPEAT system evaluates electronics on more than 50 environmental criteria, some required and some optional, that measure a product's efficiency and sustainability attributes. Products are rated Gold, Silver, or Bronze depending on how many criteria they meet. On 2007-01-24, President George W. Bush issued Executive Order 13423, which requires all United States Federal agencies to use EPEAT when purchasing computer systems. President Barack Obama issued a similar Executive Order in 2009. In 2012 EPEAT was released in India. By 2015, the number of registered green devices had risen by 108%.

In partnership with the Yale Center for Green Chemistry and Engineering, in September of 2008 GEC held a Forum for Sustainable Information and Communication Technologies (ICT) at Yale.

== Catalyst Award ==
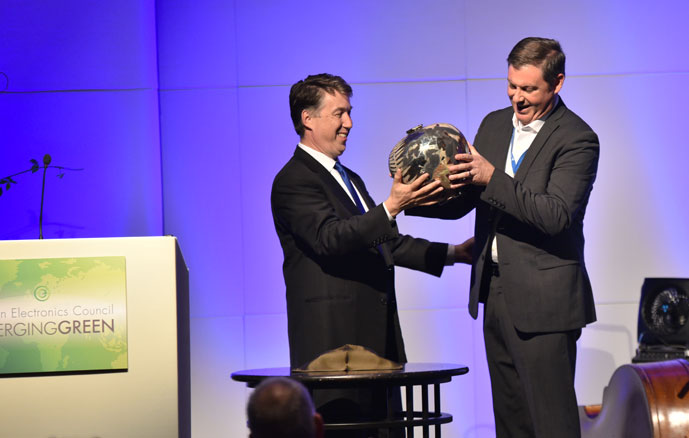
Green Electronics Councils Catalyst Award to Dell in 2015

Green Electronics Council hosts and presents the annual Catalyst Award for "Practical projects whose impact can inspire further innovation in the electronics space." In 2015 Dell received an award for their innovations in environmental safety of electronic production. During the 2014 calendar year Dell used 5000 tons of recycled plastic in its production of 34 products. Other notable nominees included Hewlett-Packard, Toshiba, and Arrow Electronics.

== Emerging Green Conference ==
Emerging Green Conference is an annual event organized by Green Electronics Council, where technology leaders meet to "explore sustainability issues throughout the lifecycle of electronics." The latest gathering happened in September 2015 where over 30 companies and organizations attended a three-day event at The Nines Hotel in Portland, Oregon.

== Board of directors ==
Mark Buckley - Founder, One Boat Collaborative

Richard Crespin - Treasurer, Chief Executive Officer, Collaborate Up

Victor Duart - Former Manager Environmental Policy and Programs IBM EMEA, ASEAN, Japan

Daniel Kreeger - Co Founder & Executive Director, Association of Climate Change Officers

JaNay Queen Nazaire, PhD - Chief Strategy Officer, Living Cities

Jeanne Ng, PhD - Chairman, Hong Kong Institute of Qualified Environmental Professionals

Verena Radulovic - Vice President, Business Engagement, Center for Climate and Energy Solutions (C2ES)

Michael Robinson - Former Program Director, Global Supplier Diversity, IBM

Carl Smith - Former CEO & President of Call2Recycle Inc.

Trisa Thompson - Chair, Former Senior Vice President and Chief Responsibility Officer, Dell

== See also ==
- Green chemistry
- One Laptop per Child
