= Les Smith (footballer, born 1892) =

Australian rules footballer

Personal information
- Full name: Leslie Alexander Smith
- Born: 16 March 1892; North Melbourne, Victoria
- Died: 8 April 1968 (aged 76); Heidelberg, Victoria
- Original team: Richmond Districts
- Height: 179 cm (5 ft 10 in)
- Weight: 77.5 kg (171 lb)

Playing career^{1}
Years	Club	Games (Goals)
1914	Melbourne	7 (1)
- ^{1} Playing statistics correct to the end of 1914.

Leslie Alexander Smith (16 March 1892 – 8 April 1968) was an Australian rules footballer who played with Melbourne in the Victorian Football League (VFL).

== Family ==
The son of John Joseph Smith (1857–1919), and Mary Ann Smith (1861–1945), née Willmott, Leslie Alexander Smith was born at Hotham (now known as North Melbourne, Victoria) on 16 March 1892.

He married Agnes Elizabeth Chantler (1898–1991) on 4 April 1925.

== Football ==
=== Melbourne (VFL) ===
Recruited from Richmond Districts, he played in 7 senior matches for Melbourne in 1914.

=== Brighton (VFA) ===
He transferred to Brighton in 1915.

== Marksman ==
On 14 October 1932, representing the Melbourne Cricket Club Rifle Club, Smith, a professional gunsmith with Edwards and Motton (see catalogue), won The King's Prize at the national rifle shooting competition held in Sydney.

== Death ==
He died at Heidelberg, Victoria on 8 April 1968.
