= China Quality Certification Center =

Chinese administration for product standards and quality certification

The China Quality Certification Center (CQC, Chinese: 中国质量认证中心; pinyin: Zhōngguó Zhìliàng Rènzhèng Zhōngxīn) is a Chinese administration based in Beijing with responsibilities for the implementation of product certification. It is responsible for product standards and quality standards sold on the Chinese market.

== Structure ==
The CQC is under control of the China Certification & Inspection Group, which is approved by the State General Administration for Quality Supervision and Inspection and Quarantine and the Certification and Accreditation Administration of the People's Republic of China.

== History ==
The administration evolved from the former China Commission for Conformity Certification of Electrical Equipment, which was founded in 1985. In April 2002, the CQC was founded as a result of merging several organizations and administrative agencies (among them China National Import & Export Commodities Inspection Corporation Quality Certification Centre, Electrical Equipment Subcommittee, Home Appliance Subcommittee and CCIB Beijing Review Office). In September 2007, the authority was restructured in 2007. In 2014, CQC is the largest certification authority in China.

== Membership ==
CQC is a national certification body (NCB) and official member of the following organizations:

- IQNet
- International Federation of Organic Agriculture Movements
- ANF
- CITA

== See also ==
- Guobiao
- List of GB standards
- Taiwan's Chinese National Standards
- CCC China Compulsory Certificate
- Voluntary CQC Mark Certification
- CCAP China Certification Centre for Automotive Products
- SAC Standardization Administration of China
