= Leslie Smith (businessman) =

Leslie Charles Smith, OBE (6 March 1918 – 26 May 2005), was a co-founder of Lesney Products, the company famous for making Matchbox cars.

== Biography ==
Smith was born in Enfield, Middlesex, left school at the age of 14, and was working for J. Raymond Wilson, a die-casting company, as an export buyer in London when World War II broke out in 1939, whereupon he joined the Royal Navy. He served with Rodney Smith, and after the war had ended, in 1947, they founded Lesney Products. The name 'Lesney' was formed by combining their first names.

He married Nancy Jackson-Moore in 1948.

Following Lesney's success with Matchbox cars, Lesney Products was awarded the Queen's Award to Industry in 1966, and he was awarded the Order of the British Empire in 1968. Lesney Products was declared insolvent in 1982. Leslie Smith then became chairman of the board of governors for St Paul's School, Winchmore Hill and another school in north London, where he lived until his death.

He had two sons and a daughter.
