= Lundby =

Lundby and Lundbye are place names and surnames of Scandinavian origin. They may refer to:

== Places ==
=== Denmark ===
- Lundby, Aalborg, a village near Gistrup in Aalborg Municipality
  - Battle of Lundby, fought near Lundby, Aalborg in 1864 during the Second War of Schleswig
- Lundby, Svendborg Municipality, a village in Svendborg Municipality
- Lundby, Vordingborg Municipality, a village in Vordingborg Municipality

=== Sweden ===
- Lundby, Gothenburg, a suburb of Gothenburg
  - Lundby Old Church, in Lundby, Gothenburg
- Lundby, Örebro, a suburb of Örebro
- Västerås Lundby, a parish in the Diocese of Västerås, Sweden

== People ==
- Anders Andersen-Lundby (1841–1923), Danish landscape painter
- Daniel Lundby (born 1976/77), U.S. politician in Iowa, son of Mary Lundby
- Johan Thomas Lundbye (1818–1848), Danish painter and graphic artist
- Maren Lundby (born 1994), Norwegian ski jumper
- Mary Lundby (1948–2009), U.S. politician in Iowa, mother of Daniel Lundby
- Preben Lundbye (born 1950), Danish football player and coach
- Thor-Erik Lundby (1937–2015), Norwegian ice hockey player
- Wanja Lundby-Wedin (born 1952), Swedish trade unionist

== Other uses ==
- Lundby (company), a Swedish maker of dollhouses
- Lundby IF, a football club located in Hisingen, Göteborg, Sweden

== See also ==
- Lundby, disambiguation page on Danish Wikipedia which includes additional entries
- Lundby, disambiguation page on Swedish Wikipedia which includes additional entries
