= Nuremberg Toy Museum =

Coordinates: 49°27′17″N 11°04′28″E

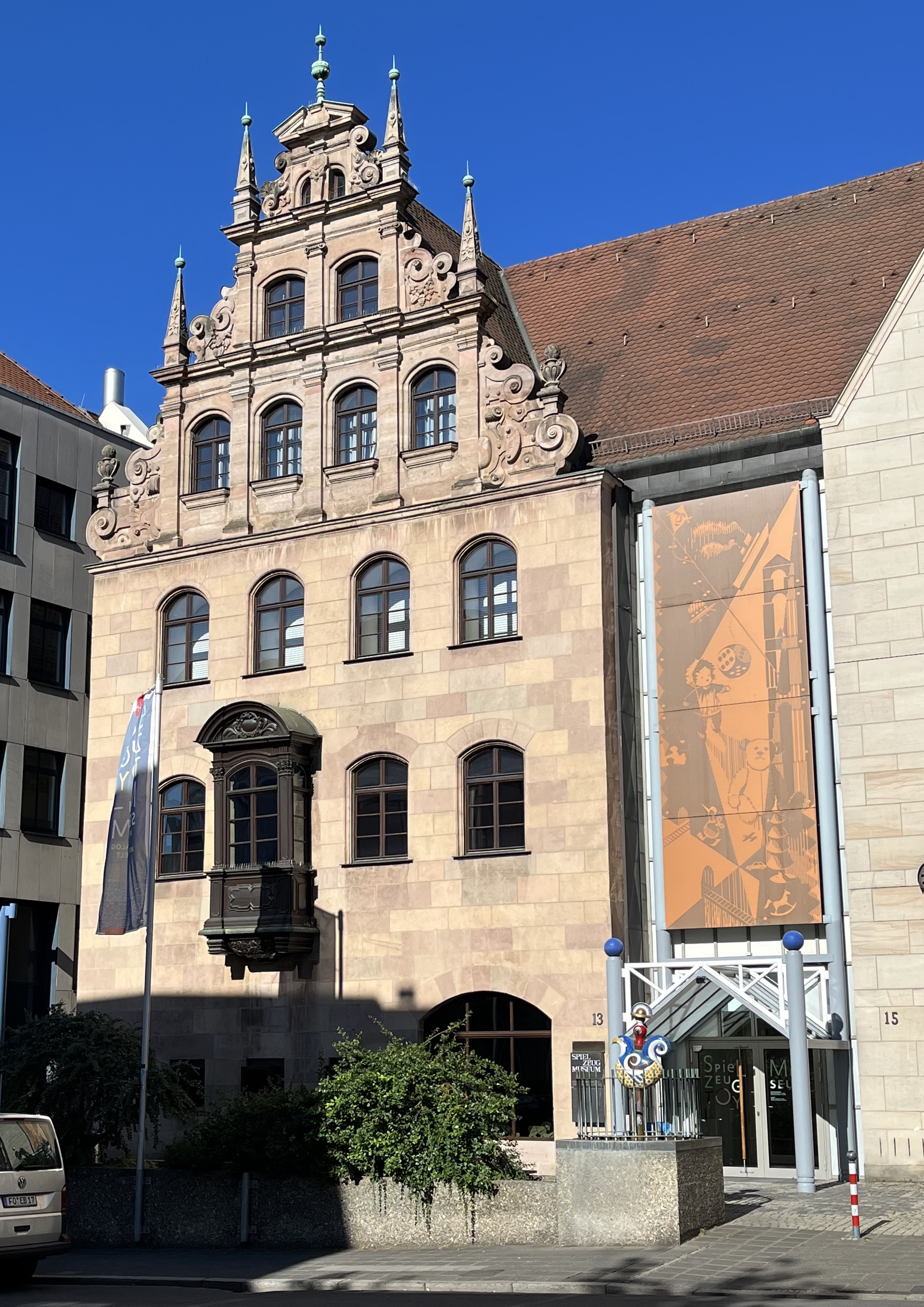
- The Nuremberg Toy Museum, also called Lydia Bayer Museum
- Former name: Lydia Bayer Museum
- Established: 1971
- Location: Nuremberg
- Type: Toy Museum
- Collection size: 87,000
- Visitors: > 150,000
- Director: Karin Falkenberg
- Architects: Wilhelm Haller, senior
- Website: museums.nuremberg.de

The Nuremberg Toy Museum (also known as Lydia Bayer Museum) in Nuremberg, Bavaria, is a municipal museum, which was founded in 1971. It is considered to be one of the most well known toy museums in the world, depicting the cultural history of toys from antiquity to the present.

== History ==
=== Hallersches Haus ===
The toy museum's building, located in Karlstraße 13–15, can be dated back to 1517 as being the property of Wilhelm Haller, senior, member of a patrician family. Jeweler, Paul Kandler bought the house in 1611 and had the front rebuilt for the first time (probably by Jakob Wolff senior). The oriel (this type of oriel is called a chörlein) was constructed roughly around 1720. A distinctive feature of the Hallersches Haus, but also of many other houses in Nuremberg, is the Dockengalerie, which is a wooden gallery built around an inner courtyard, connecting the adjacent buildings. 'Docken' refers to turned wooden balusters used for construction galleries and limbless wooden dolls.

The estate was badly damaged during the Second World War, but it was rebuilt in the following years. Furthermore, the building is one of the stops of the “Historical Mile Nuremberg”.

=== Lydia and Paul Bayer ===
The core of the museum's collection is approximately 12,000 toys, which have been collected over decades by Lydia (1897–1961) and Paul Bayer (1896–1982). The Bayers had begun to put together a comprehensive collection of toys by the early 1920s, although toys were not seen as having cultural or historical value at the time. The private Lydia Bayer Museum, located in Neubaustraße in Würzburg, was open to the public.

=== Museum ===
The city of Nuremberg took over the Bayers' stocks in 1966. Thanks to the support of the aid association, the Hallersches Haus in Karlstraße was ready to open in 1971.

The toy museum has turned into a museum with international recognition. The exhibits area was expanded to 1,200 m^{2} (13,000 sq ft) in 1989 and to 1,400 m^{2} (15,000 sq ft) in 1998 due to roof constructions. The Toy Museum and the German Games Archive in Nuremberg are part of the network Nuremberg Municipal Museums founded in 1994. Other places that are part of the network are the Dürer-Haus, the City Museum Fembohaus, the Tucher Mansion, the Museum for Industrial Culture, the Documentation Centre Nazi Party Rally Grounds and the Memorium Nuremberg Trials.

=== Gockelreiterbrunnen (Rooster Rider Fountain) ===
On the occasion of the inauguration of the museum in 1971, which incidentally marked the 500-year anniversary of Dürer’s birth, the Gockelreiterbrunnen (Rooster Rider Fountain), designed by Nuremberg artist, Michael Mathias Prechtl, was erected in front of the toy museum. The figure depicting a rooster rider is on top of a pipe rising up out of the fountain's washed-concrete basin. The colorfully painted ceramic figure, which is surrounded by iron bars, fits well into the location in two respects: not only is its shape reminiscent of a wooden toy referring to the function of the museum, but it also recalls Nuremberg as the city of toys.

== Exhibitions ==
The collection, which contains around 87,000 objects, of which only about five percent are visible in the museum, spans the time from antiquity to the present. It focuses on the development of toys over the past two hundred years. The great majority of the toys are located in the museum depot, but can also be viewed on the museum's website, which gives an overview of the cultural history of the toy. Nuremberg's special role as a metropolis of toys in the industrial age becomes particularly apparent due to the local toy industry.

=== Permanent exhibitions and other exhibition spaces ===
- Outdoor area

Café La Kritz with backyard railroad
Outdoor playground, Shadowland (rope net pyramid, rolling ball sculpture, labyrinth, distorting mirror)

- First floor

In the Beginning was the Wood: wooden toys
Special exhibitions/event room for temporary exhibitions
Shop

- Second floor

Dolls, dollhouses: Nuremberg kitchens or doll's kitchens, paper and tin figures
Optical toys: zograscope, the magic lantern or the stereoscope.

- Third floor

World of Technology: a large model railway layout, numerous vehicles, trains, steam engines, movable figures and more technical toys

- Top floor

Toys since 1945: Lego, Barbie, Playmobil and more current toys
The newly built kids’ area Kids on top offers a wide range of activities. Children can play, do handicrafts, play table-top football, experiment with various construction sets or read children’s books.
