= Astolat Dollhouse Castle =

Miniature doll house

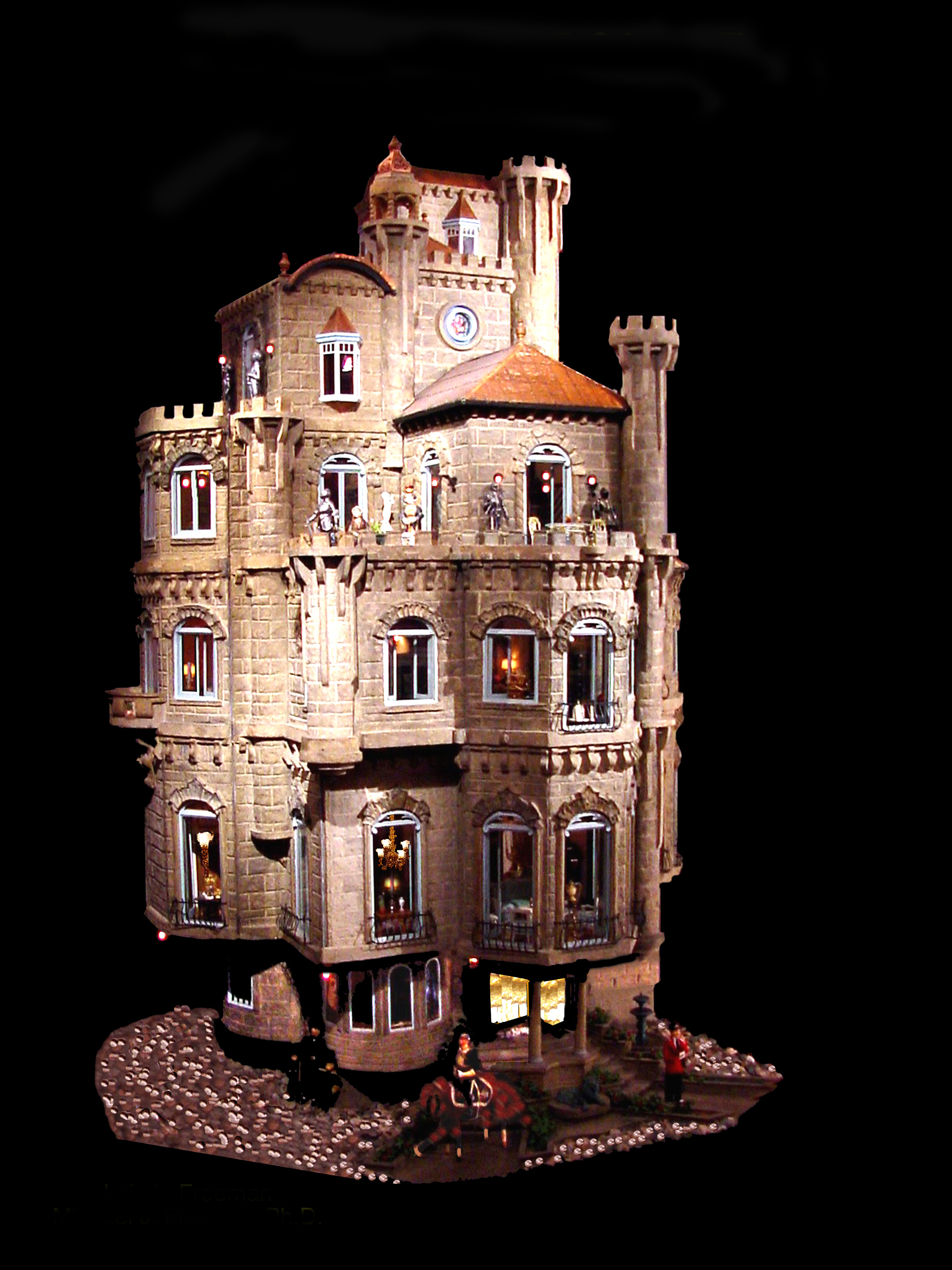
- Exterior of the Astolat Dollhouse Castle
- Year: 1974-1987
- Dimensions: 2.7 m (8.9 ft)
- Weight: 360 kg
- Owner: Michael and Lois Freeman
- Website: astolatdollhousecastle.com

Astolat Dollhouse Castle (also known as Astolat Castle or Dollhouse Castle) is a museum-quality dollhouse by Elaine Diehl, created between 1974 and 1987. It was appraised as "the most valuable dollhouse in the world," at US$8.5 million in 2015.

Its value is attributable to its hand-made intricate 360 kg (800 lb), 2.7 m (9 ft) tall, 29 room structure, and its collection of miniatures including furnishings, with working fireplaces, stained glass panels, and 10,000 handcrafted miniature pieces that include original works of art, gold chandeliers, and the smallest antique Bible in the world. Many of its miniatures, including some made of gold, sterling silver, are antique. Few other museum quality dollhouses meet such criteria.

== History ==
Inspired by Alfred Tennyson's poetry Lady of Shalott. about the Lady Elaine of Astolat, Astolat Dollhouse Castle was created over a thirteen-year period between 1974 and 1987, primarily by master miniaturist Elaine Diehl with support and assistance from artisans throughout the world. The exterior took a year to sculpt to the final finish. The interiors and adjoining areas were each constructed to the highest standards of that time.

Astolat Dollhouse Castle was initially displayed in Diehl's museum shop in Sedona, Arizona, until her retirement in 1996. It was a popular tourist attraction which drew people from around the world.

== Description ==
The structure has a total height of 2.7 m (9 ft), and was built to a 25.4 mm to 304.8 mm scale (one inch to one foot) (1:12) scale. It weighs approximately 360 kg (800 lb). The interior consists of 29 rooms and adjacent areas (e.g. hallways, corridors, sitting areas, and windows), that contain approximately 10,000 separate interior pieces.

Astolat Castle has a copper roof and structural wood walls that are finished on the exterior with papier-mâché and then sculpted to a rough faux stone finish. The Colleen Moore fairy Castle Dollhouse and the Astolat Dollhouse Castle were designed with fixed contiguous exterior walls to create a three-dimensional viewing effect, when viewers peer into the castle. Other walls can be opened or removed for group viewing.

On 10 May 1982, dollhouse creator Colleen Moore took a trip to view the Astolat Dollhouse and met with Diehl. When Astolat was first installed, the museum's curator stated "each room is decorated with furniture, tables, chairs, artwork and lighting made by artisans from around the world, and the materials are unique and expensive." Unique parquet floors, framed mirrors, tapestries, gold chandeliers, oil paintings, and fireplaces lead up to the top floor housing the "wizard’s tower" outfitted with telescopes and zodiacal signs. The furnishings include seven periods and styles, including Spanish, Oriental, Tudor, 18th-century English, and Victorian.

=== Layout and floor plan ===
Consisting of seven levels, stairways, and hallways, Astolat Dollhouse Castle was created for 360 degree viewing. As with the Colleen Moore dollhouse certain exterior walls are fixed to create a 3-D viewing experience. The basement level consists of the Knights Of Columbus room, wine cellar, kitchens, and the armory. The main floor contains the entrance foyer, main stairway, and butler's closet. Next level up contains the formal living room, dining room, and music room and its audience balcony. The fourth level contains the private library containing duelling pistols, a library of miniature books, fireplace, miniature daguerreotypes, and the oil painting display area. Fifth level contains the sleeping quarters. Sixth floor contains the grand ballroom, musician's alcove, bar area and sitting rooms. Wizards's tower is on the top level and contains hand painted zodiac signs, telescope, observatory and astronomical depictions.

=== Interior decoration ===
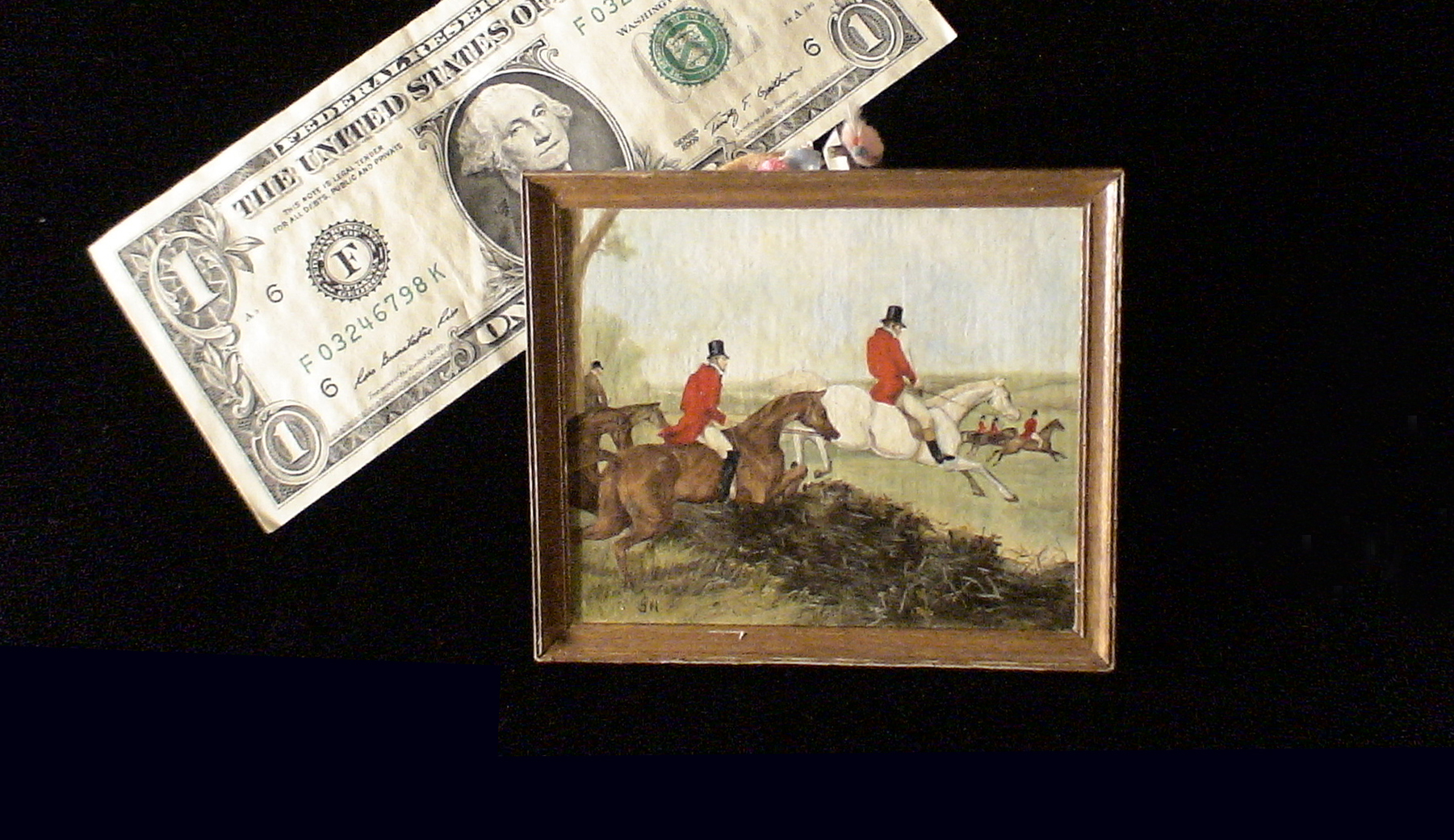
Built to a 1:12 scale, the Castle contains over 10,000 furnishings including miniature original oil paintings

The interior spaces include miniature fittings and furniture most of which are antique, hand-crafted, and one-of-a kind. Some are even artefacts from Pompeii. Other furnishings, and ancillary art includes sculptures, original oil paintings, portrait miniatures, hand sewn tapestries, carved wood moldings, chandeliers, sconces, framed mirrors, and accessories. These include miniature inlaid marble bathrooms, parquet floors, gold chandeliers, hand etched wood panels, and pieces made of gold.

Most of the interior furnishings and artwork are original and were purchased at auctions from private collectors, or commissioned from known miniaturists and artisans. Such artists include Eric Pearson, George Becker, Warren Dick, Laurel Coulon, Mary McGrath, among others. The lighting features fully illuminate all areas of Astolat and separate day and night-time lighting systems automatically adjust based on the time of day.

== Ownership ==
The Astolat Dollhouse Castle was acquired by collectors Michael and Lois Freeman in 1996 and moved to the Tee Ridder division of the Nassau County Museum of Art in Roslyn Harbor, New York, US. Freeman is an avid collector of dollhouses and since her acquisition of the Astolat Dollhouse Castle she has continually upgraded its interiors with additional one-of-a-kind antique miniatures, tiny antique furniture, and paintings in addition to those that already existed within the structure. There are reportedly now about 30,000 miniatures pieces in the Astolat Dollhouse Castle collection, but only about 10,000 are displayed at any one time. The inventory is rotated.

The Astolat Dollhouse Castle was on rare public display at the Time-Warner Center at Columbus Circle, New York City, from 12 November to 8 December 2015. All proceeds from this exhibition benefited charities for children, including St Jude's Children's Hospital, Orphans International, and others.

== Critical reception ==
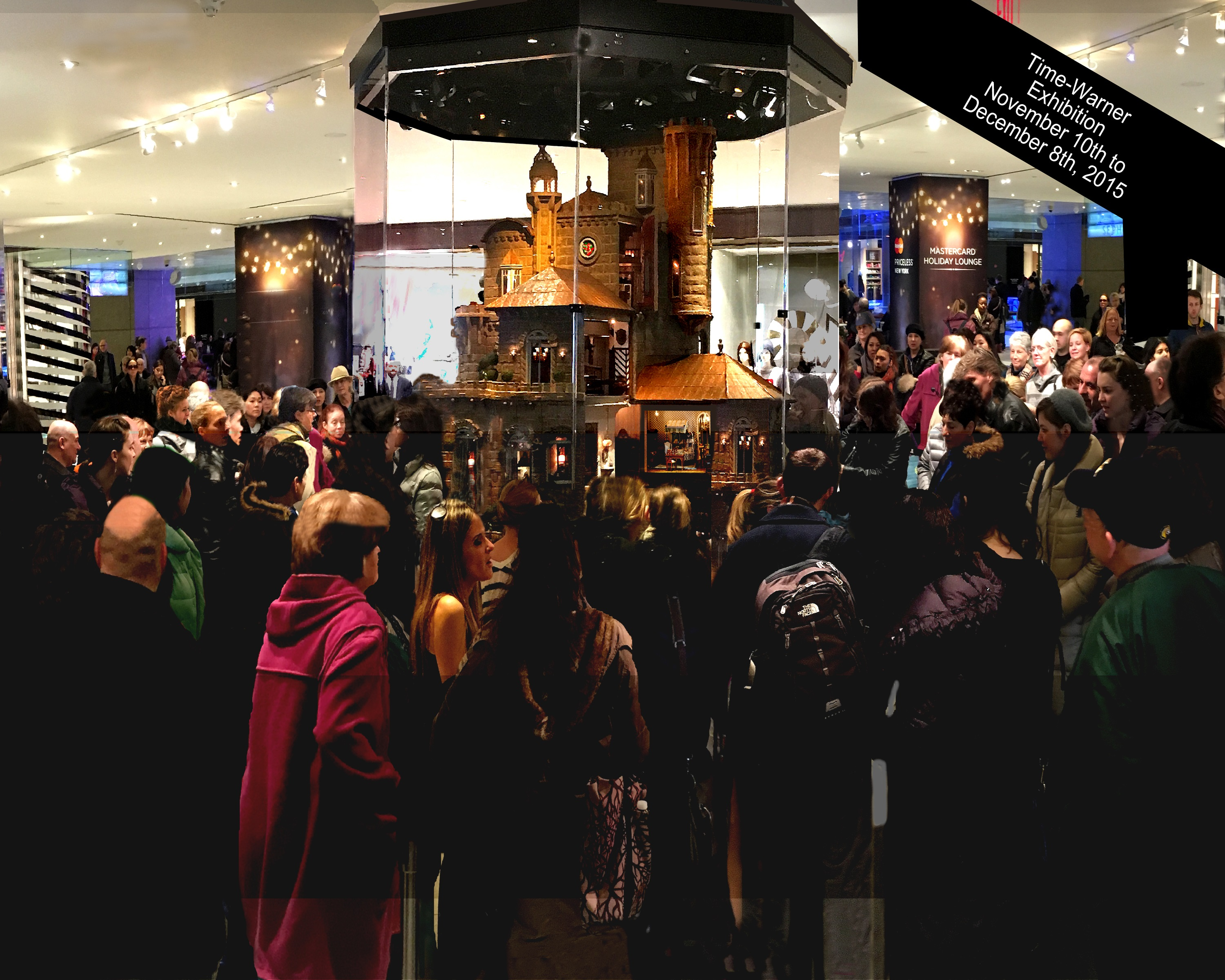
On rare public display at the Time-Warner Center in New York City 2015, from 10 November until 4 December for the exclusive purpose of raising money on behalf of children's charities. Approximately 7,000 people per day attended not including special events.

"The Castle is worth so much because of the structure itself," said Paula Gilhooley, the museum's curator. Furthermore, "Astolat is one of the finest miniature structures in the world exhibiting a rare combination of sculpture, art, engineering and detail that sets it apart from anything in existence to date." Astolat "is a massive feat of construction and when you see it, it will leave you absolutely speechless".

In 2006, a photo presentation of the Astolat Dollhouse Castle was released courtesy of the Nassau County Museum of Art, an updated version released in 2009 showed some of the upgraded interior furnishings and acquisitions, and a video presentation that previewed a charity tour of the dollhouse.

== Other notable dollhouses ==
Other notable dollhouses include Titania's Palace, which is on display in Denmark, Tara's Palace, which is on display in Ireland at the Tara's Palace Museum of Childhood in Powerscourt Estate, and the Stettheimer Dollhouse in New York, United States, which is primarily known for its original miniature artwork. Queen Mary's Dolls' House in Windsor Castle in England includes contributions from many notable artists and craftsmen of the 1920s.
