= Titania's Palace =

Miniature castle

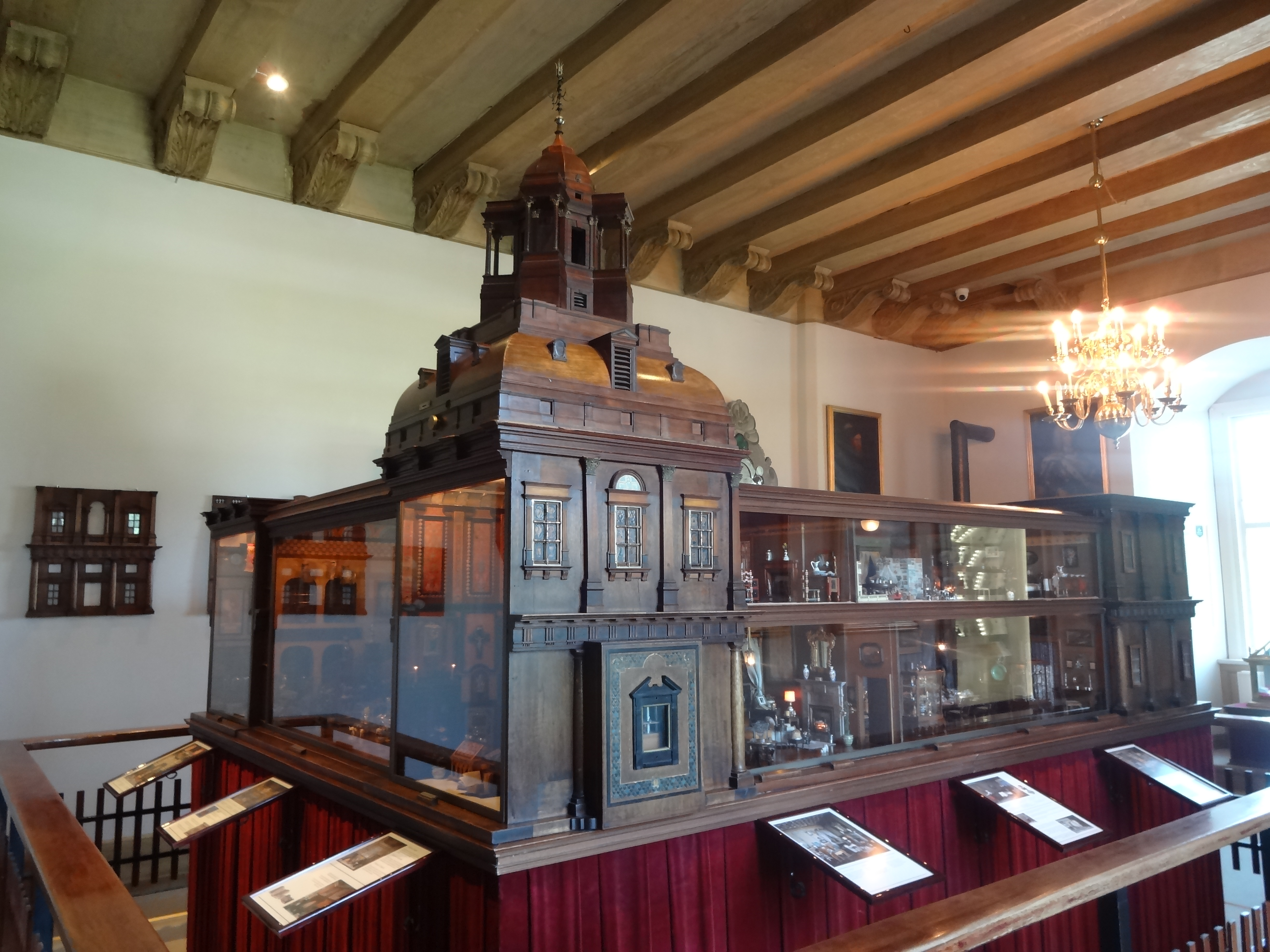
Titania's Palace within Egeskov Castle

Sir Neville Wilkinson and his 'Titania Palace of Fairies' dolls' house, Sydney, 1934

Titania's Palace is a miniature castle (dollhouse) that was hand-built in Ireland by James Hicks & Sons, Irish Cabinet Makers, who were commissioned by Sir Nevile Wilkinson from 1907 to 1922. Wilkinson's daughter Guendolen claimed to have seen a fairy running under the roots of a tree, in a wood beside their home at Mount Merrion House. It is said that Guendolen felt sorry for the fairies, who have to live in caves.

In 1926, Nevile and Beatrix Wilkinson sailed on the RMS Olympic with Titania's Palace to the United States to exhibit it at the Sesqui-Centennial Exposition in Philadelphia, Pennsylvania. After the six-month exposition they intended to tour the dollhouse in American cities to continue raising money for crippled children.

In the early 1930s, Wilkinson loaned the miniature to the NSPCC, who exhibited the item around the country, in an effort to raise funds. While exhibited in Croydon in the UK, Titania's Palace was visited by 4,882 people and led to over £150 (a sum equivalent to approximately £10,000 in 2017 prices) being donated to the Croydon Branch of the NSPCC.

In 1978, Titania's Palace went up on auction at Christie's but was lost to Ireland in a bidding war to Denmark where it remains on display today.

The palace consists of 18 rooms and salons, is 4'1" tall, is built in a 12" to 1" scale (1:12)and contains hand-carved mahogany furniture. There are 3000 tiny works of art and miniatures from around the world on display inside the palace. When the palace was purchased at auction in London in 1978, the purchaser was revealed to be Legoland in Denmark. It stayed on display at Legoland until 2007. In 2006 Count Michael Ahlefeldt-Laurvig-Bille made a loan agreement with Lego to display Titania's Palace at Egeskov Castle in Denmark from 2007 onwards, where it remained until 2025. It was announced by designer Jim Lyngvild in January 2026 that the palace was now in Sostrup Castle, which is currently not open to the public but plans are ongoing to have the palace on view again, as part of the castle’s Drakonheart children’s development camp.

The underbidders at the London auction were disappointed at Titania's Palace being lost to Ireland. They commissioned a new palace, a dollhouse called Tara's Palace, which is on display in the Little Museum of Dublin.

== Other notable dollhouses ==
Other notable dollhouses include Tara's Palace, which is on display in Ireland at the Tara's Palace Museum of Childhood in Powerscourt; the Stettheimer dollhouse in New York City, which is primarily known for its original miniature artwork; Astolat Dollhouse Castle, appraised at $8.5 million; and Colleen Moore's fairy castle, housed in Chicago's Museum of Science and Industry.
