= Petronella de la Court =

Dutch art collector

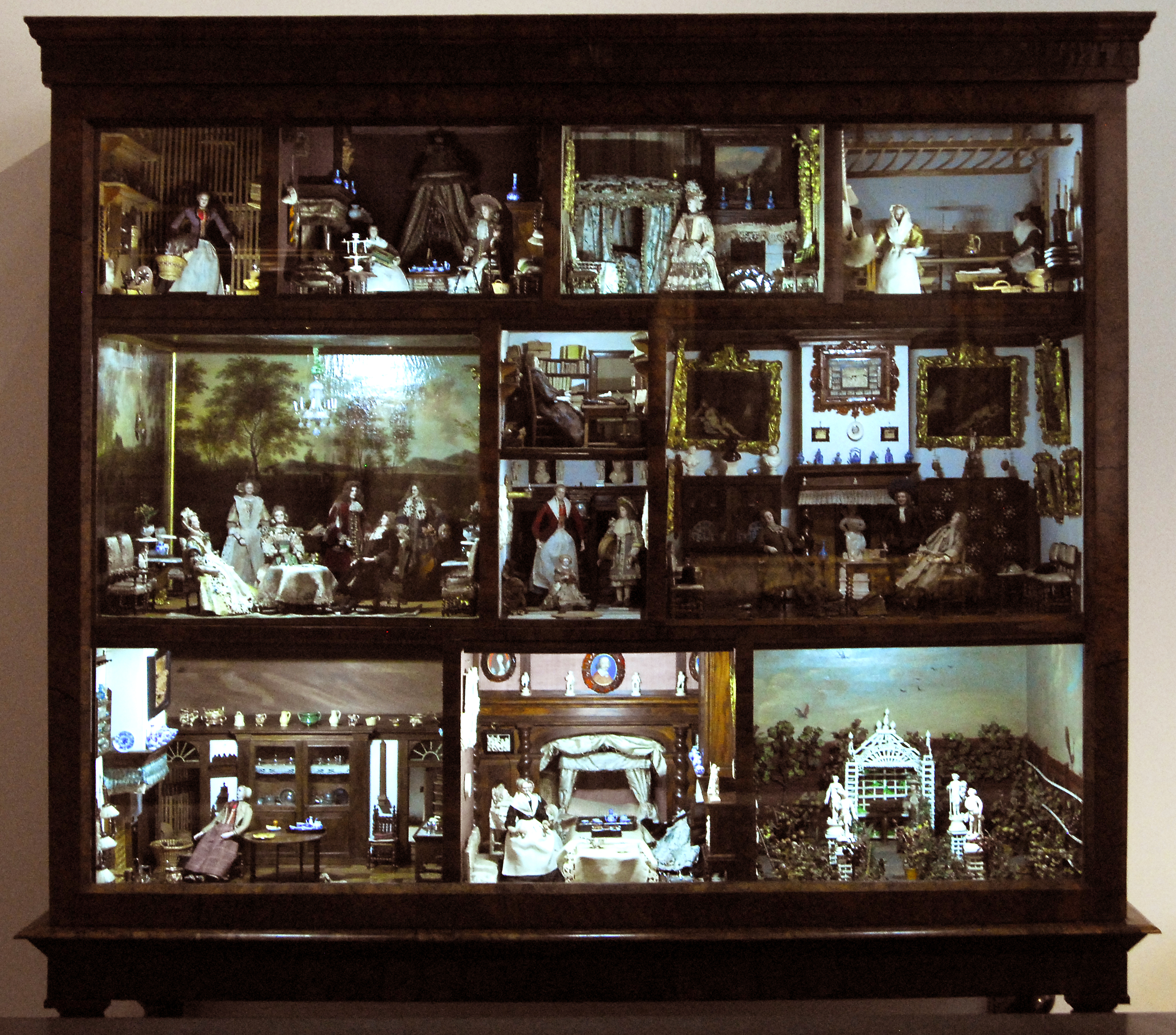
- Born: August 24, 1624; Leiden, South Holland
- Died: March 22, 1707 (aged 82); Amsterdam

Petronella de la Court (24 August 1624 - 22 March 1707) was a Dutch art collector.

De la Court married her cousin, the silk merchant Adam Oortmans, on 24-8-1649 in Leiden, and they had 10 children together. They lived in the Stilsteeg. In 1657 the couple Oortmans-De la Court bought the brewery "De Zwaan" on the Singel in Amsterdam, located where the Bungehuis is situated today.

She is best known for her dollhouse, currently in the collection of the Centraal Museum, Utrecht.
