= Nevile Wilkinson =

British officer of arms and Army officer (1869–1940)

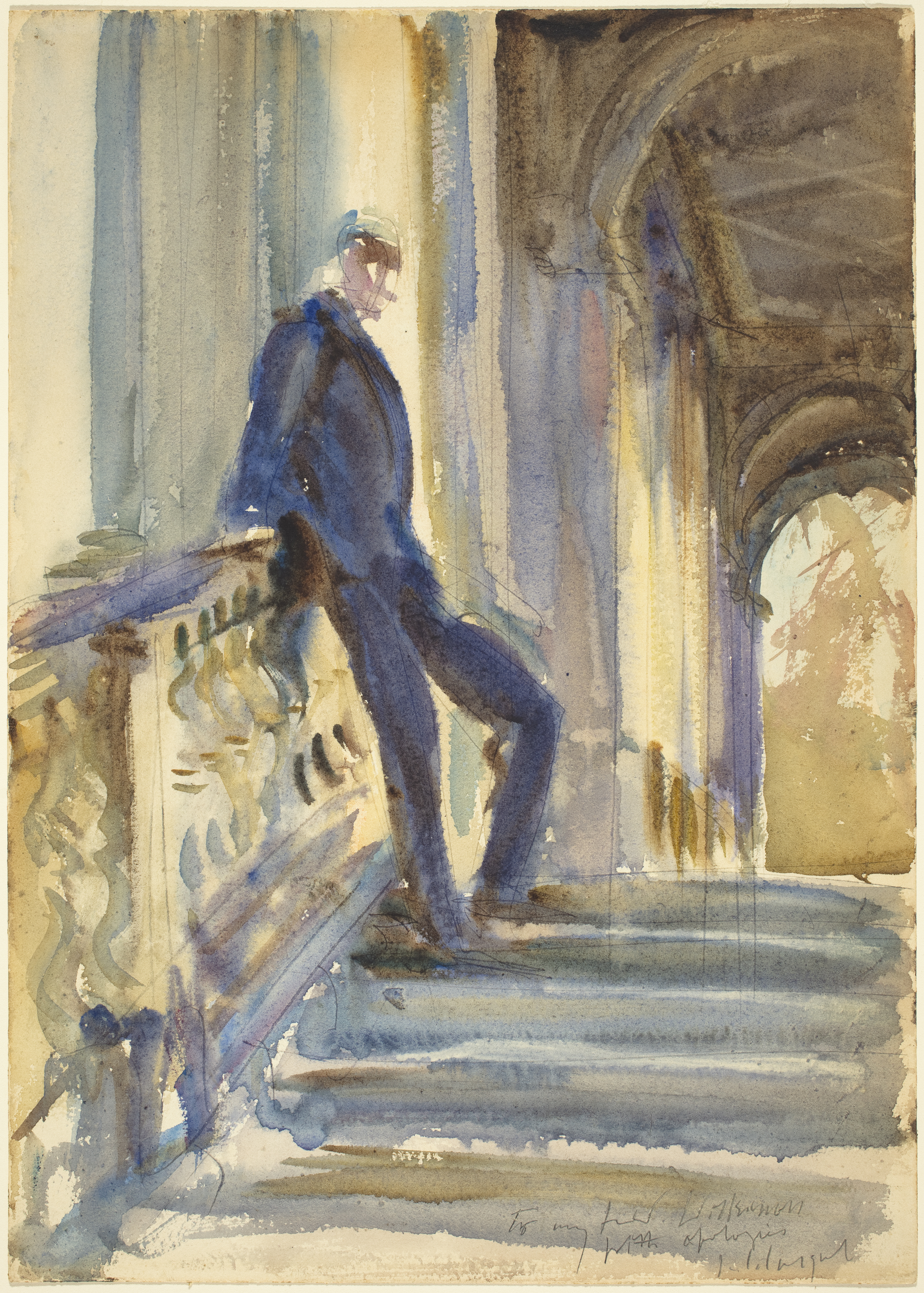
Painting of Wilkinson by John Singer Sargent

Major Sir Nevile Rodwell Wilkinson, KCVO (26 October 1869 – 22 December 1940) was a British officer of arms, British Army officer, author and a dollhouse designer.

== Early life and military career ==
Wilkinson was born in Highgate, Middlesex, the son of a barrister. He was educated at Harrow School and entered the Royal Military College, Sandhurst in 1889. He was commissioned into the Coldstream Guards in 1890, promoted lieutenant on 1 July 1896, and captain on 1 April 1899. He served twice with his regiment in the Second Boer War, the second time from April 1902 when he was in command of reinforcements of 250 officers and men. They left Southampton in the troopship Dilwara on 15 April, arriving in South Africa the following month. He retired from the army in 1907. He returned to service in the First World War as a staff officer, initially as a staff captain in the embarkation headquarters of the British Expeditionary Force, then as a deputy assistant quartermaster general (DAAG) from July 1915, as commandant of an advanced base (with the temporary rank of major) from November 1915, DAAG again from June 1916 and staff captain again from August 1917 to March 1919. He was granted the brevet rank of major in the reserve of officers on 3 June 1916 and the substantive rank of major on 9 May 1918.

== Heraldic career ==
The office of Ulster King of Arms, Principal Herald of Ireland, was created 1552 by Edward VI, with full jurisdiction over Irish heraldry. There were two disparate heraldic traditions in Ireland at that time – the old Gaelic Irish tradition, and the Norman and Anglo-Irish traditions which were part of the European heraldic mainstream. At this time, Ulster King of Arms was Principal officer of arms of all Ireland.

Most of Ulster King of Arms's work was heraldic rather than genealogical, although collecting genealogies and proving pedigrees were essential to ensure that arms were used and inherited by the rightful heirs.

However, from the start of the eighteenth century Ulster began to acquire other duties, as an officer of the crown intimately linked to the government. These duties were largely ceremonial. For example, Ulster King of Arms had to decide and arrange precedence on state occasions at the court of the English Viceroy (later Lord Lieutenant) of Ireland, formally introduce new peers to the Irish House of Lords, and record peerage successions. An additional responsibility came in 1783, when Ulster King of Arms became registrar for the newly established chivalric Order of St Patrick. This was an Irish equivalent of such long-established English institutions as the Order of the Garter. Ulster became its registrar, responsible for administering its affairs. He continued to be responsible for the recording of peerage successions, since Irish peers (like Scottish peers) were allowed to elect representative peers to the House of Lords at Westminster until 1922. The heraldic and ceremonial duties of Ulster continued down to the twentieth century until 1940. The post was effectively in suspense between 1940 and 1943, after which the heraldic and genealogical duties were carried out by a Chief Herald of Ireland.

Wilkinson was appointed Ulster King of Arms in 1908, succeeding the disgraced previous office-holder Sir Arthur Vicars after the theft of the St Patrick regalia in 1907. He was the last person to hold that office. As such, he was Principal Officer of Arms of Ireland, and one of the chief heraldic officers in the United Kingdom. It is not known what his qualifications for the job were, apart from his undoubted artistic abilities and his marriage to a well-born lady.

His job was to manage Irish heraldry – mostly the granting and use of arms. He was also to examine the genealogical records and pedigree relating to Irish families, and to maintain the register of members of the Order of St Patrick, as the premier civilian honour for Irish peers and others. The order was suspended 1922 after the promulgation of the Irish Free State.

Major Wilkinson apparently spent most of his time in London at the Office of the Keeper of Royal Arms. It is not clear why he did so, given that the Office of Arms (and presumably all records) were located in the Bedford Tower in Dublin Castle. By 1923, Wilkinson had begun visiting the office regularly, which caused a minor political problem for the fledgling Irish Government for sixteen years.

It was discovered around 1923 that the office of Ulster King of Arms had not been legally transferred to the Irish Government and since the office was created by royal prerogative in 1552, the British Government said that they could not transfer the office to Ireland. Eventually, the Irish Government decided in 1930 to let Wilkinson continue his work until his death, at which point the office would be considered by the Irish Government to have lapsed.

The National Library of Ireland website shows that Wilkinson granted and confirmed arms right up to 1940. Indeed, more than two dozen confirmations of arms are dated 21 December 1940, the day before he died.

One of Wilkinson's achievements in his capacity as Ulster King of Arms was the establishment of the State Heraldic Museum in 1909.

Wilkinson was appointed Commander of the Royal Victorian Order (CVO) after the visit of King George V to Dublin in 1911, knighted in the 1920 New Year Honours, and appointed Knight Commander of the Royal Victorian Order (KCVO) after the state opening of the Parliament of Northern Ireland in June 1921.

== Personal life ==
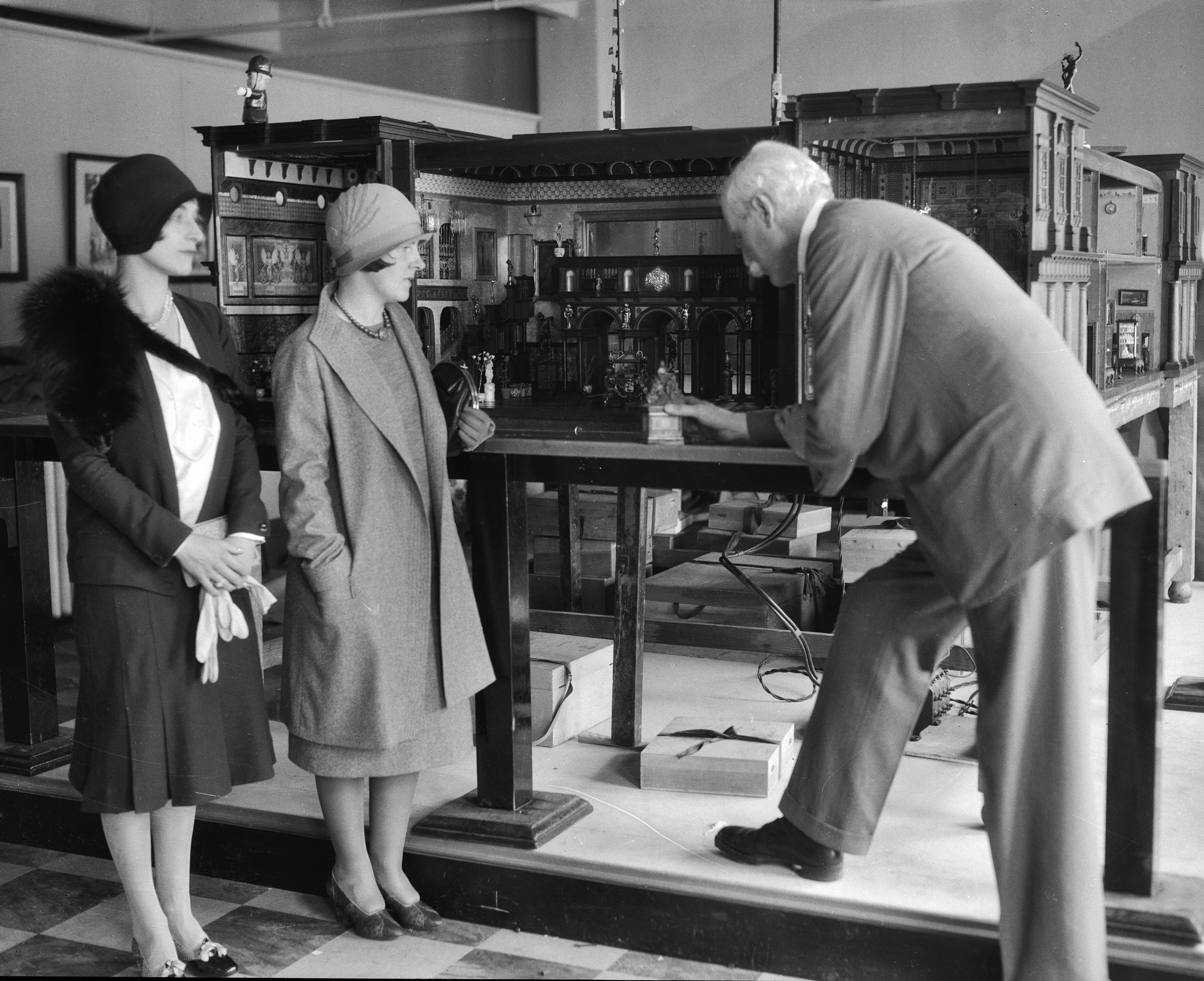
Wilkinson showing off Titania's Palace to two women

Wilkinson married Lady Beatrix Francis Gertrude Herbert, first daughter of the 14th Earl of Pembroke and his wife, Lady Beatrix Lambton, herself eldest daughter of The 2nd Earl of Durham, in 1903. The couple moved into Mount Merrion House, in the south of County Dublin, Ireland, where they lived until the start of the First World War in 1914. They had two daughters, Guendolen and Phyllis. To celebrate their births, two redwood trees were planted opposite the entrance to the Church of St Thérèse.

Wilkinson built two famous dollhouses, Titania's Palace (completed and inaugurated in 1922 by Queen Mary) and Pembroke Palace (completed in 1907). Titania's Palace remained in the family for many years, but was sold after 1960 first to an English amusement park, then to Legoland and is currently lent to Egeskov Castle. Pembroke Palace Dolls House is now at Wilton House, seat and home of William Herbert, 15th Earl of Pembroke.

Wilkinson was survived by his widow and his two daughters. Lady Beatrix was remarried in 1942 to The 7th Earl of Wicklow (1877–1946), a title which is now extinct.

== Arms ==
Coat of arms of Nevile Wilkinson

Notes
Confirmed by Nevile Wilkinson, Ulster King of Arms, 15 June 1908.
Crest
On a wreath of the colours a wolf passant Proper charged on the shoulders with a cross pommel Sable.
Escutcheon
Per chevron Sable and Argent three leopards' faces jessant-de-lys counterchanged.
Motto
Cave Lupum
