= Re-Ment =

Japanese toy company

Re-Ment Co., Ltd.
- Industry: Toys; Miniature Food; Confectionery
- Founded: May 1998
- Headquarters: 102-0083 3-5 Kojimachi Kojimachi Silk Building 3F, Chiyoda Tokyo
- Key people: Ootake Hiroshil (President)
- Products: Miniatures, mobile phone charms, miniature food, furniture
- Total assets: 36 million yen
- Number of employees: 34
- Website: www.re-ment.co.jp

RE-MENT Co., Ltd. (株式会社リーメント, Kabushikigaisha-Riimento), located in Chiyoda Tokyo, is a Japanese manufacturer of collectible plastic toys. The company's name is derived from a combination of the phrase "reform the entertainment", alluding to their desire for innovation in the toy market. Established in 1998, Re-Ment currently sells a line of highly detailed miniature food, furniture and animal figures as well as mobile phone charms, doll fashions and magnets. Re-Ment miniatures have been featured in two television advertisements by the Kellogg Company for their Pop-Tarts pastry product.

In 2008, the company began a collaborative partnership with Disney on a popular line of miniature toys featuring Mickey Mouse and characters from Toy Story, Winnie-the-Pooh, Alice in Wonderland and other stories. In July 2009, Re-ment partnered with Sanrio on a line of Hello Kitty miniatures. Re-Ment's most recent collaboration is with San-X on a line of Rilakkuma miniatures.

== Company history ==
The following are major events in the company history:

- May, 1998 - Re-Ment Co., Ltd is established in Chiyoda, Tokyo in Japan.
- June, 2002 - The first Puchi Sample Series Japanese Meals is launched.
- July, 2004 - The first Re-ment furniture, a pink refrigerator, is released.
- July, 2006 - The first international office opened in Virginia Beach, Virginia (US).
- May, 2007 - The first series created for the US market, Fun Meals, is released.
- January, 2008 - The first Re-Ment/Disney collaborative series Disney Cookie Mascots is released.
- September, 2008 - The first pouch-packaged series, My Town Supermarket, is released.
- July, 2009 - The first Re-Ment/Sanrio collaborative series, Sanrio Cookie Mascots, is released.
- October, 2010 - The first Re-Ment/San-X collaborative series, Rilakkuma Warm & Fluffy Meals is released.

== Products ==
=== Puchi Sample Series ===
Re-ment Puchi Petite Is-Dinner-Ready?! Collection

Puchi is a traditional Japanese word meaning "mini", "little" or "petite" in English. The food miniatures in Re-Ment's Puchi Sample Series resemble the plastic sample food found in the windows and display cases of restaurants throughout Japan. Targeted at the adult collecting community, these 1:6 scale toys are typically displayed in dioramas and dollhouses or used with action figures and fashion dolls such as Blythe or Barbie.

Typically, each Puchi Sample Series is packaged for retail sale in a display box containing 5, 6, 8, 9, 10 or 12 individually boxed sets. Each box contains the miniatures sealed in plastic and an informative paper insert. Initially, a piece of ramune candy was packaged in every box. Later releases occasionally included a piece of apple gum. Starting in 2008, Re-Ment began packaging some of their newly released sets in plastic pouches rather than individual boxes.
