= Lundby (company) =

Swedish dollhouse company

Lundby Gothenburg dollshouse (1960 model)

Lundby, also known as Lundby of Sweden, is a Swedish maker of dollhouses and miniature furniture for the mass market. Lundby dollshouse furniture has been produced since 1947 and their dollshouses have been sold since the late 1940s. The company started in the Gothenburg borough of Lundby, which also gave the company its name.

Lundby was the first maker to include electrical lights in their dollhouses ("child safe" 4 volt rather than the more standard 12 volt) and is notable for following contemporary trends in interior and furniture design.

The most common Lundby house style is the 'Göteborg' ('Gothenburg') which first appeared in 1959. This style of house was very popular and is still being sold today. It was renamed as the 'Småland' dolls house in 2006. There have been many other styles of Lundby dollhouse introduced over the years, such as the 'Stockholm' House in 1975 (and a newer, more modern, version in 2005).

Lundby houses, furniture and accessories are 3/4 inch scale, also known as 1:16 or today as 1:18 scale, where 1 foot in real life is 3/4 inch in dollhouse size.

== History and house styles ==
The Lundby house from the early 1950s was the earliest style of house produced. It has a basic rectangular shape with a bright red pitched roof, a blue painted frame and paper brickwork on the outside. It consisted of 5 rooms (3 on the first floor and 2 on the ground). It had a wooden spiral staircase which led from the largest room to the central room on the first floor. Dollhouses of this style could either be electrified or unelectrified. Rival dollhouse manufacturer Lerro produced houses in the same style and dimensions; however the roof, frame and brickwork were different colours to that of the Lundby model.

The 'Göteborg' house was first produced in 1959. As with most Lundby dollshouses produced from the mid-1940s to the 1990s, there were many significant and minor variations on each model. This particularly applied to the Göteborg dollhouse with its funky wallpaper, a white frame, a bright red pitched roof, 2 rooms on the first floor and 3 rooms on the ground floor it became Lundby's most popular house and gradually their mainstay of dollhouse production. It is easy to distinguish between early and later versions of this house during the 1960s. The early model (1960–1964) featured light blue floors, a wooden staircase with full banisters, a tall chimney (1.7") and a wall with an open doorway which divided the bathroom in two. This model was further refined by giving the bathroom a separate door. But this privacy only lasted a matter of two or three years and the bathroom's door and dividing wall went all together. Later models (1967–1969) reduced the height of the chimney (0.75") to its present-day size.

Lundby Terrace / Flat Roof (1967 flat pack version)

The 'Terrace' or 'Flat Roof' house was also produced in the 1960s. Lundby's success with the Göteborg model gave them the chance to experiment with new house designs. This culminated in the production of the 'Flat Roof' or 'Terrace' house between 1966-67. As its name suggests it had a flat roof, allowing children to place garden furniture on it. Two different models were produced - one which was a solid two storey house and another which came flat packed and could be constructed up to three or four storeys high.

After winning 'Best Toy' award in 1967 by the Swedish Toy Merchants Association, Lundby continued to improve and further the design of the Göteborg dollhouse. By the latter half of the 1960s, the windows were fitted with frames moulded in white plastic with Perspex imitation glass, and the dollhouses gradually became more neutral in decor.

The 'Economy' house dates back to the late 1960s. At the tail end of the 1960s, Lundby adapted the Göteborg design to create a cheaper, unelectrified house with wider market appeal, called the 'Economy' house. The number of rooms were the same as the Göteborg but reversed; so the ground floor had two and the first floor three rooms. Gone was the funky wallpaper and a more neutral look was adopted.

Later house styles include the 'Stockholm' house or 'Large dollhouse' from 1975, the 'Stockholm' house from 2005 (designed by Box Design architects Ann Morsing and Behan Nord), the Gotland house from 2008 and the 'Småland' house from 2006 (previously known as the Göteborg).
