= Dollhouse =

Miniature toy house

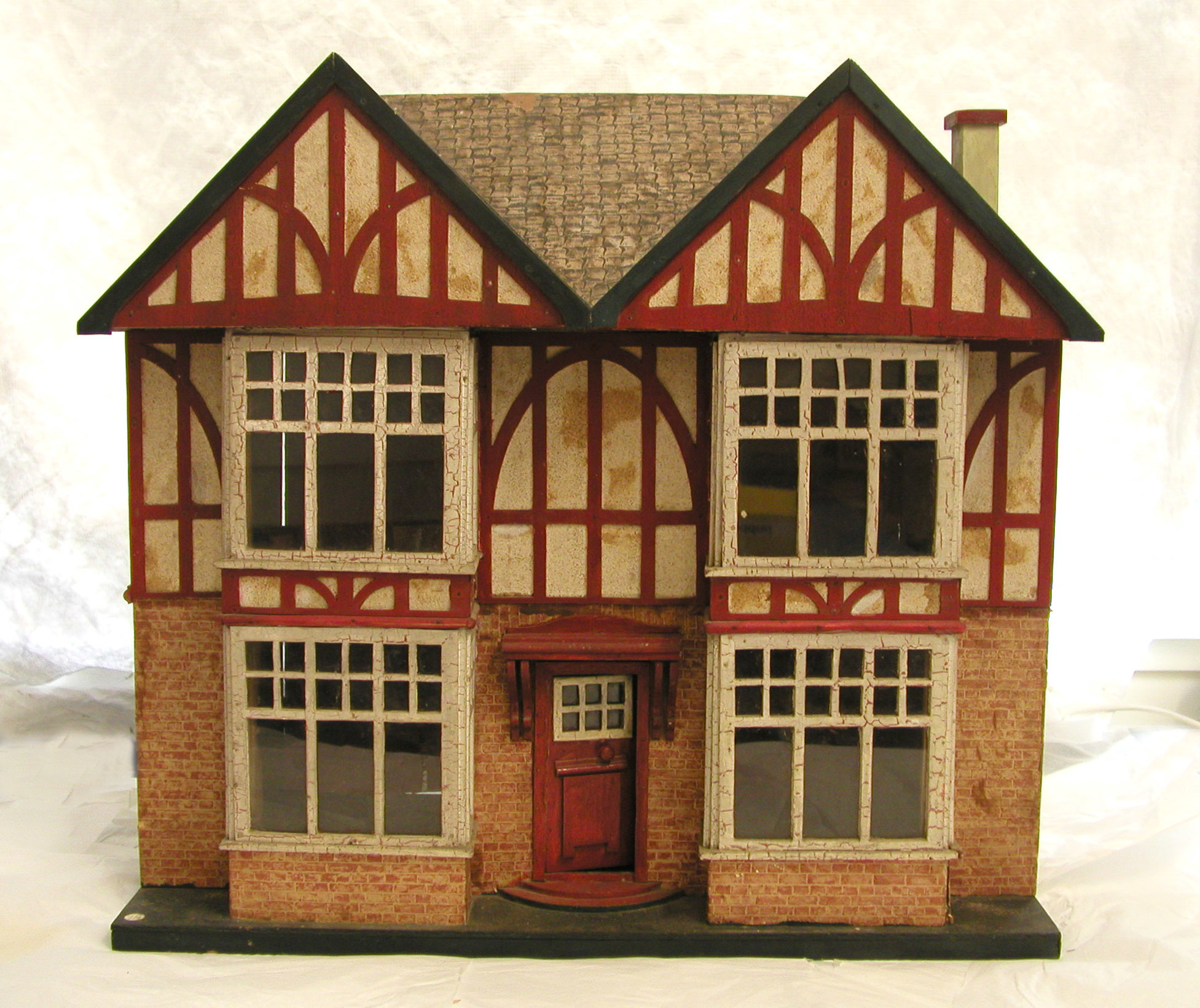
Tudor style doll's house circa 1930

A dollhouse or doll's house is a toy house made in miniature. Since the early 20th century, dollhouses have primarily been the domain of children, but their collection and crafting is also a hobby for many adults. English-speakers in North America commonly use the term dollhouse, but in the United Kingdom and other English-speaking countries the term is doll's house (or, less commonly, dolls' house). They are often built to put dolls in.

The history of today's dollhouses can be traced back about four hundred years to the baby house display cases of Europe, which showed idealized interiors. Smaller dollhouses with more realistic exteriors appeared in Europe in the 18th century. Early dollhouses were all handmade, but following the Industrial Revolution and World War II, they were increasingly mass-produced and became more standardized and affordable. Dollhouses can range from simple boxes stacked together used as rooms for play, to multi-million dollar structures displayed in museums.

Contemporary children's play dollhouses are mostly on a 1:18 (or 2/3") scale, while a 1:12 (or 1") scale is common for dollhouses made for adult collectors.

== History ==
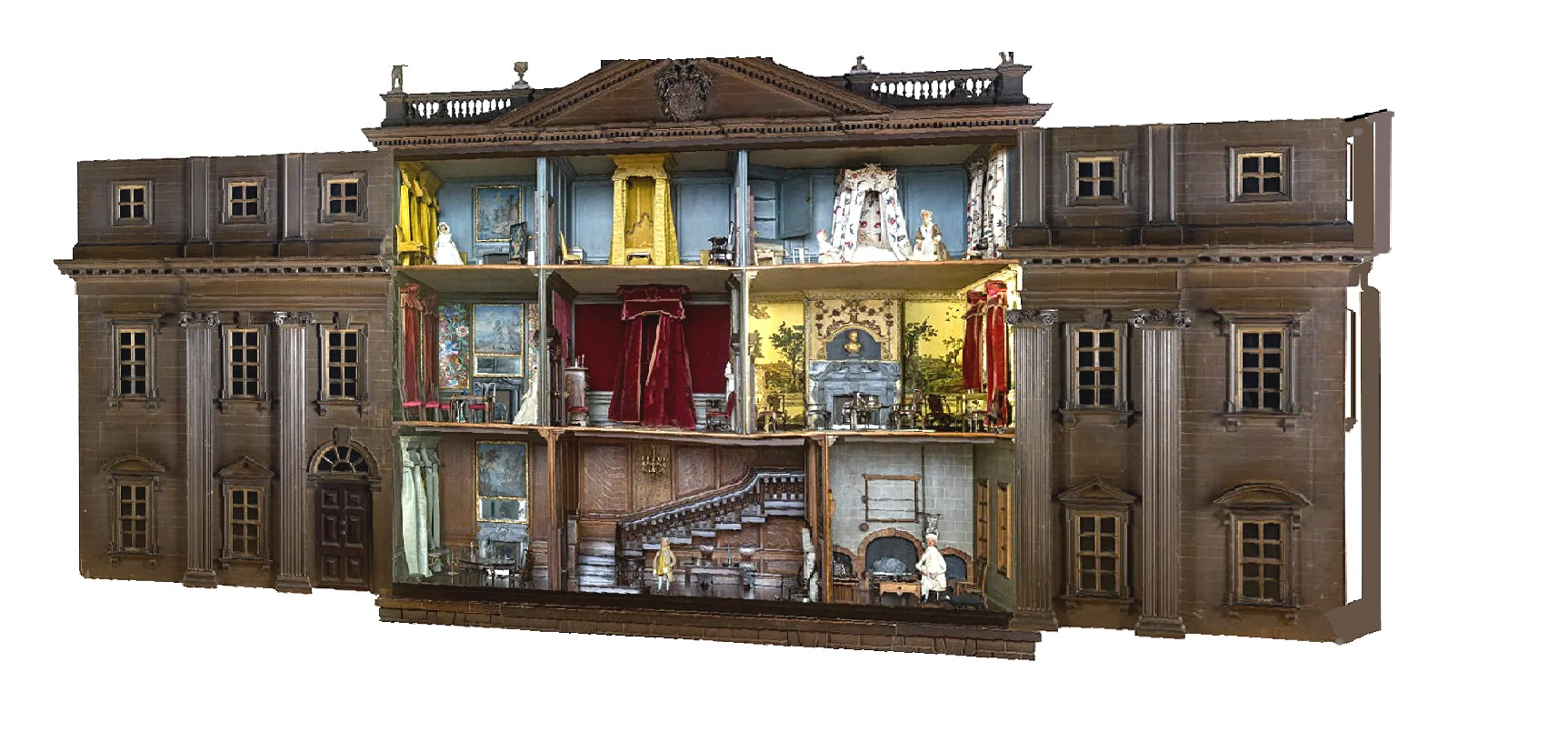
The Nostell Doll's House in West Yorkshire, England, This one-of-a kind miniature house was handcrafted in the 1730s. As that time, doll's houses were not considered to be toys; rather, they were called "baby houses" and used to teach girls how to run a household.

Miniature homes, furnished with domestic articles and resident inhabitants, both people and animals, have been made for thousands of years. The earliest known examples were found in the Egyptian tombs of the Old Kingdom, created nearly five thousand years ago. These wooden models of servants, furnishings, boats, livestock and pets placed in the Pyramids almost certainly were made for religious purposes.

The earliest known European dollhouses were the baby houses from the 16th century, which consisted of cabinet display cases made up of individual rooms. The term “baby” in baby house is coined from the old English word meaning doll. Dollhouses of this period showed idealized interiors complete with detailed furnishings and accessories. The cabinets were built by hand with architectural details, filled with miniature household items and were solely intended for adults. The baby moniker referred to the scale of the houses rather than the demographic it was aimed at. They were off-limits to children, not because of safety concerns for the child but to protect the dollhouse. Such cabinet houses were trophy collections owned by the few matrons living in the cities of Holland, England and Germany who were wealthy enough to afford them and, fully furnished, were worth the price of a modest full-size house's construction.

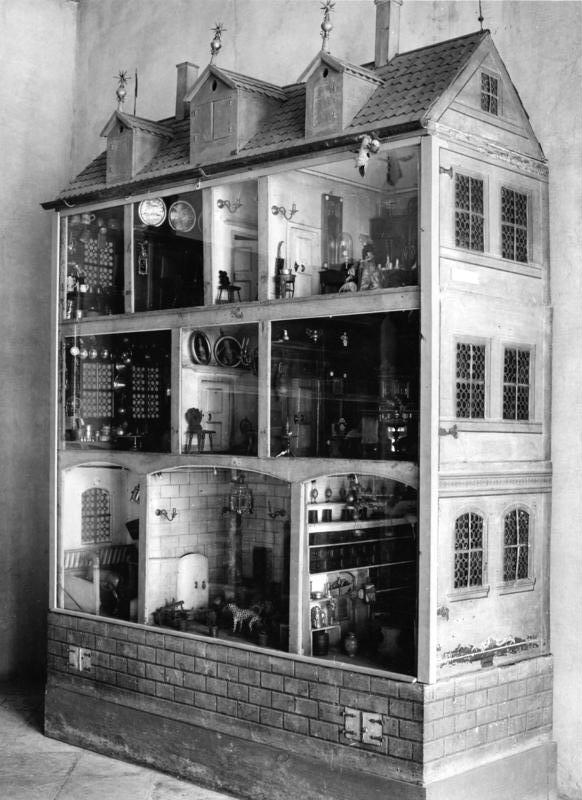
A 17th century Nuremberg, Germany dollhouse

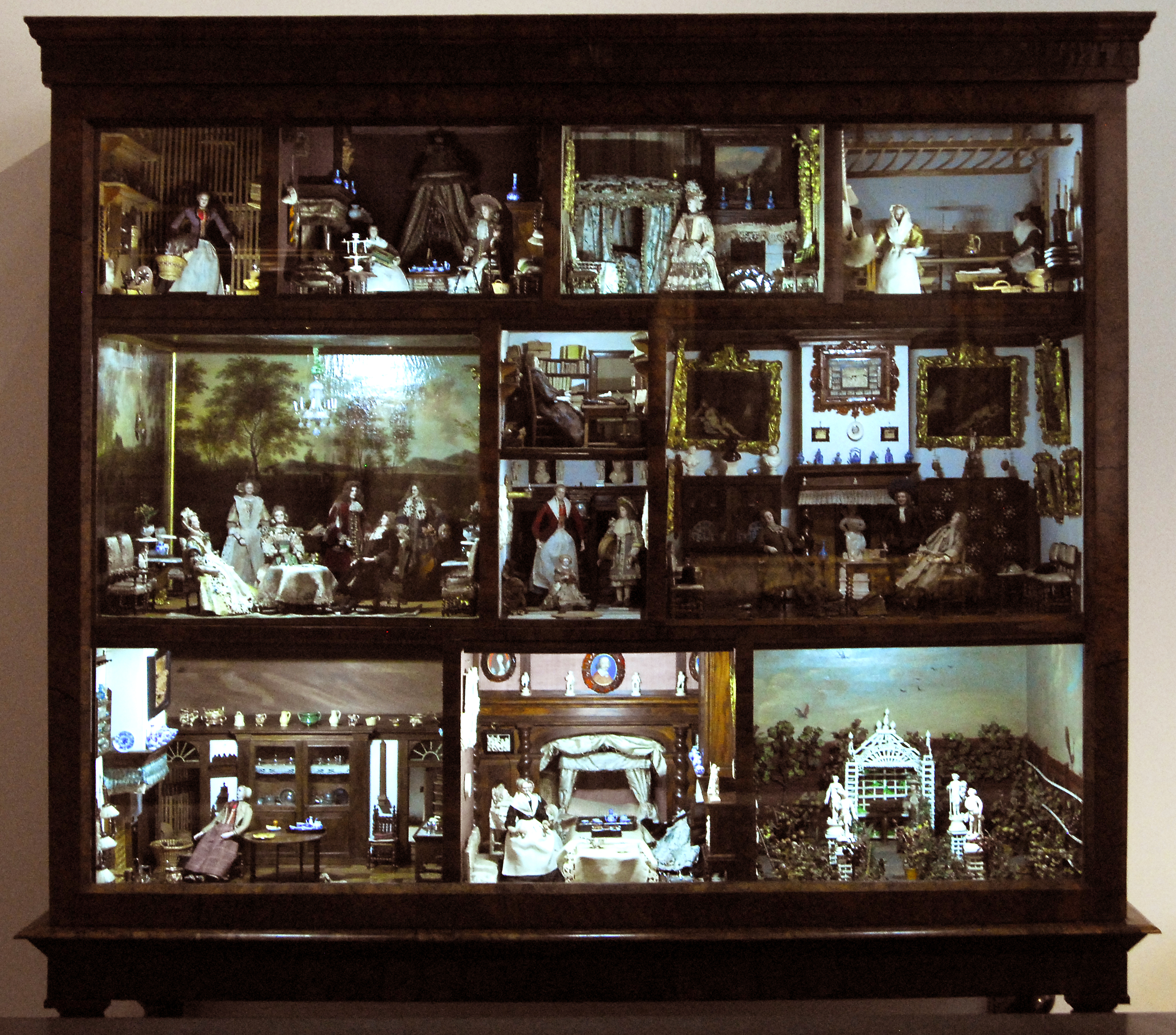
Dutch cabinet dollhouse of Petronella de la Court, Amsterdam 1670-1690 on display at Centraal Museum

The earliest known recorded baby house was commissioned from 1557-1558 by Albrecht V, Duke of Bavaria.

Smaller doll houses, such as the Tate house with more realistic exteriors, appeared in Europe in the 18th century. Nuremberg kitchens, a type of single-room dollhouse, date back at least to 1572, when one was given to Dorothea and Anna, the Princesses of Saxony, daughters of Augustus, Elector of Saxony aged five and ten.

The early European dollhouses were each unique, constructed on a custom basis by individual craftsmen. With the advent of the Industrial Revolution, factories began mass producing toys, including dollhouses and miniatures suitable for furnishing them. German companies noted for their dollhouses included Christian Hacker, Moritz Gottschalk, Elastolin, and Moritz Reichel. The list of important English companies includes Silber & Fleming, Evans & Cartwright, and Lines Brothers (which became Tri-ang). By the end of the 19th century American dollhouses were being made in the United States by The Bliss Manufacturing Company. In France, the Deauville dollhouses were made by the manufacturer Villard & Weill in the first quarter of the 20th century.

Germany produced the most prized dollhouses and doll house miniatures up until World War I. The doll houses were produced in Nuremberg, Germany; which, since the sixteenth century, was coined as the 'toy city'. Their baby houses were thought to be the origin for the basic standards of contemporary doll houses. Notable German miniature companies included Märklin, Rock and Graner and others. Their products were not only avidly collected in Central Europe, but regularly exported to Britain and North America. Germany's involvement in WWI seriously impeded both production and export. New manufacturers arose in other countries.

France produced the dollhouses known as Deauville Dollhouses. They were made by the VILLARD & WEILL company, mainly between 1905 and 1925. This toys manufacturer won prizes in Sydney, Paris and St Louis World Fairs.

The TynieToy Company of Providence, Rhode Island, made authentic replicas of American antique houses and furniture in a uniform scale beginning in about 1917. Other American companies of the early 20th century were Roger Williams Toys, Tootsietoy, Schoenhut, and the Wisconsin Toy Co. Dollhouse dolls and miniatures were also produced in Japan, mostly by copying original German designs.

After World War II, dollshouses were mass-produced in factories on a much larger scale with less detailed craftsmanship than before. By the 1950s, the typical dollhouse sold commercially was made of painted sheet metal filled with plastic furniture. Such houses cost little enough that the great majority of girls from the developed western countries which were not struggling with rebuilding after World War II could own one.

== Standard scales ==
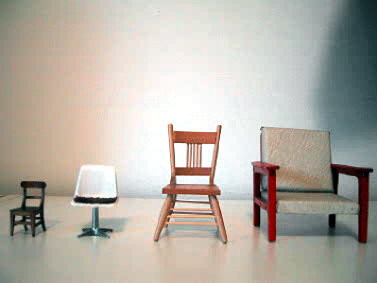
From left: 1:24 scale, 1:16 scale, 1:12 scale, 1:10 scale

The baby houses of the 17th and 18th centuries, and the toy dollhouses of the 19th and early 20th century rarely had uniform scales, even for the features or contents of any individual house. Although a number of manufacturers made lines of miniature toy furniture in the 19th century, the products were not made to a strict scale.

Children's play dollhouses from most of the 20th and 21st centuries are 1:18 or two third inch scale (where 1 foot is represented by 2/3 of an inch). Common brands include Lundby (Sweden), Renwal, Plasco, Marx, Petite Princess, and T. Cohn (all American) and Caroline's Home, Barton, Dol-Toi and Tri-ang (English). A few brands use 1:16 or 3/4"-scale.

The most common standard for adult collectors is 1:12 scale, also called 1" or one inch scale (where 1 foot is represented by 1 inch.) Among adult collectors there are also smaller scales which are much more common in the United States than in Britain. 1:24 or half inch scale (1 foot is 1/2") was popular in Marx dollhouses in the 1950s but only became widely available in collectible houses after 2002, about the same time that even smaller scales became more popular, like 1:48 or quarter inch scale (1 foot is 1/4") and 1:144 or "dollhouse for a dollhouse" scale. 1/24th scale dolls houses, and those in smaller scales, may be considered as just one species of miniature houses of this size. 1/24th (or the almost indistinguishable 1/25th) is used for a variety of models including display models and what are coming to be known as 'house portraits'. These typically focus on the exterior detail rather than the rooms inside, though there is no reason why a dolls house should not have a realistic exterior or a house portrait include interior details.

In Germany during the middle part of the 20th century 1:10 scale became popular based on the metric system. Dollhouses coming out of Germany today remain closer in scale to 1:10 than 1:12.

The largest common size for dollhouses is 1:6 which is proportionate for Barbie, Ken, Blythe and other dolls 11-12 inches tall, and furniture and accessories such as Re-Ment.

== Construction ==
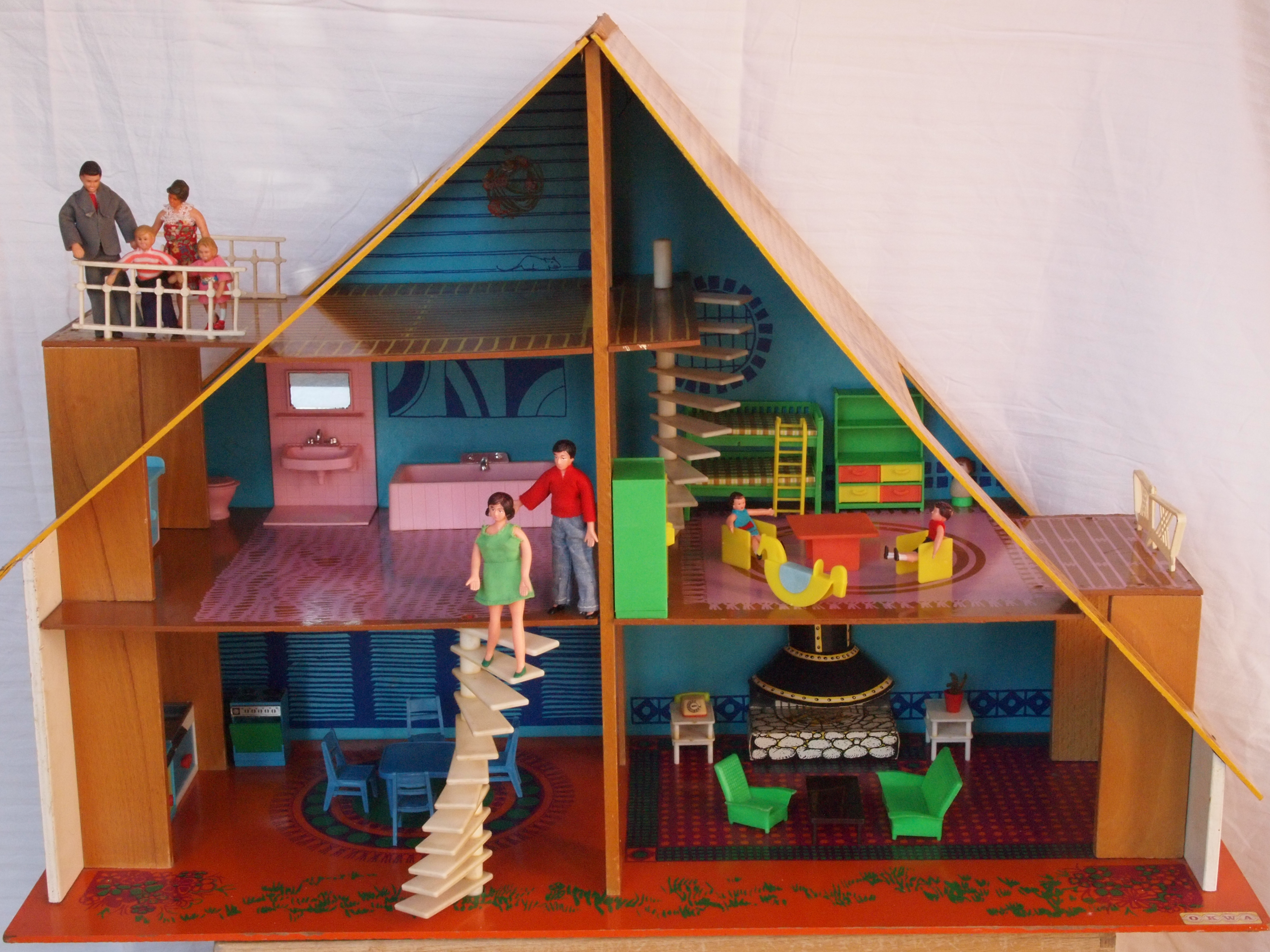
Wooden children's dollhouse with plastic furniture in 1:18 scale, Netherlands, 1974

In the United States, most houses have an open back and a fancy facade, while British houses are more likely to have a hinged front that opens to reveal the rooms.

Children's dollhouses during the 20th century have been made from a variety of materials, including metal (tin litho), fibreboard, plastic, and wood. With the exception of Lundby, 1:18 scale furniture for children's dollhouses has most often been made of plastic.

Contemporary kit and fully built houses are typically made of plywood or medium-density fiberboard (MDF). Tab-and-slot kits use a thinner plywood and are held together by a system of tabs and slots (plus glue). These houses are usually light-weight and lower cost but often require siding, shingles, or other exterior treatments to look realistic. Kits made from heavier plywood or MDF are held together with nails and glue.

== As a hobby ==
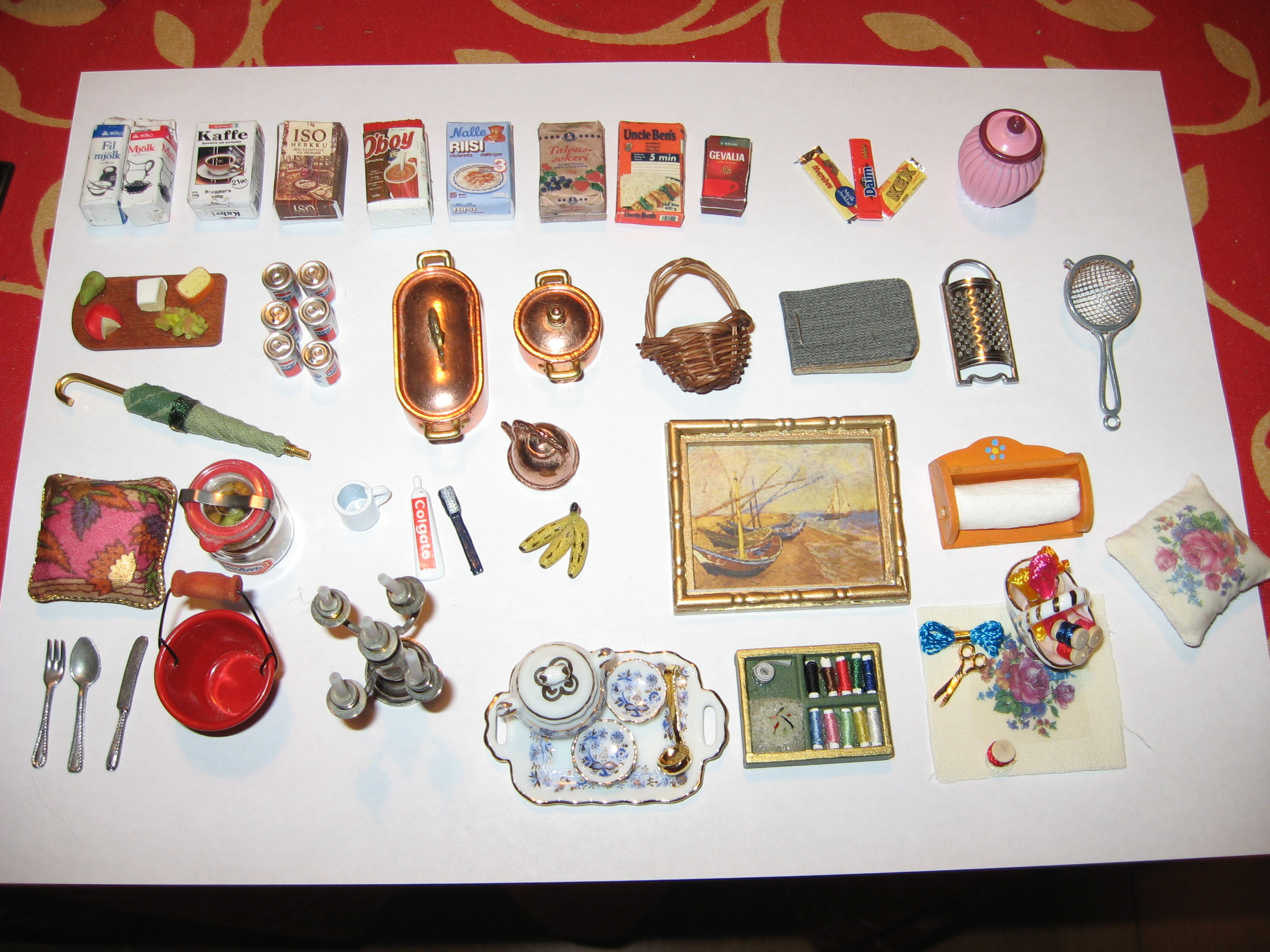
Dollhouse items in 1:12 scale

The dolls house hobby has two main focuses: construction and/or purchase of dolls houses made by or for adult enthusiasts, and collection of contemporary, vintage or antique dolls houses which were often originally made for children.

=== Dolls houses made by or for adult enthusiasts ===
Dollhouses for hobbyists and collectors are available in different forms, from ready made and decorated houses to kits to custom built houses made to the customer's design. Some design and build their own dollhouse. Simpler designs might consist of boxes stacked together and used as rooms. Miniature objects used for decoration inside dollhouses include furniture, interior decorations, dolls and items like books, couches, furniture, wallpaper, and even clocks. Some include functional kitchen appliances to create miniature food. Dollhouses for enthusiasts are available ready made and in kits, but may also be homemade.

Dozens of miniature trade shows are held by various miniature organizations and enthusiasts throughout the year, where artisans and dealers display and sell miniatures. Often, how-to seminars and workshops are part of the show features. Stores that sell miniatures also hold classes. Enthusiasts share images online and use Internet forums, blogs and other online social media to share information about dollhouses and miniatures.

=== Collection of vintage or antique dolls houses ===
Recognition of the value and enjoyment of collecting vintage and antique dolls houses as a hobby is due largely to the publications of two experts, Vivien Greene (1904-2003) in the UK, and Flora Gill Jacobs (1918-2006) in the US. Vivien Greene's first book, English Dolls' Houses of the 18th and 19th Centuries, was published in 1955; in the same year, an exhibition of period dolls houses from several countries was held in London. Flora Gill Jacobs' first book, A History of Dolls’ Houses, was published in 1953. Both collectors opened museums dedicated to dolls houses, the Rotunda (1962-1998) in Oxford, England, and the Washington Dolls’ House & Toy Museum (1975-2004), in Washington D.C., US.

Through print publications such as the International Dolls' House News (c 1969-2002) American Miniaturist, and Dolls House and Miniature Scene, collectors around the world shared photos, tips, queries and information; today, websites, blogs, social media, and online forums allow even more collectors to share their hobby.

== Notable dollhouses ==
Anna Köferlin’s (no longer existing) Nuremberg doll house was commissioned in 1631 and was publicly displayed and advertised by Köferlin in the form of original verses composed on broadsheet.

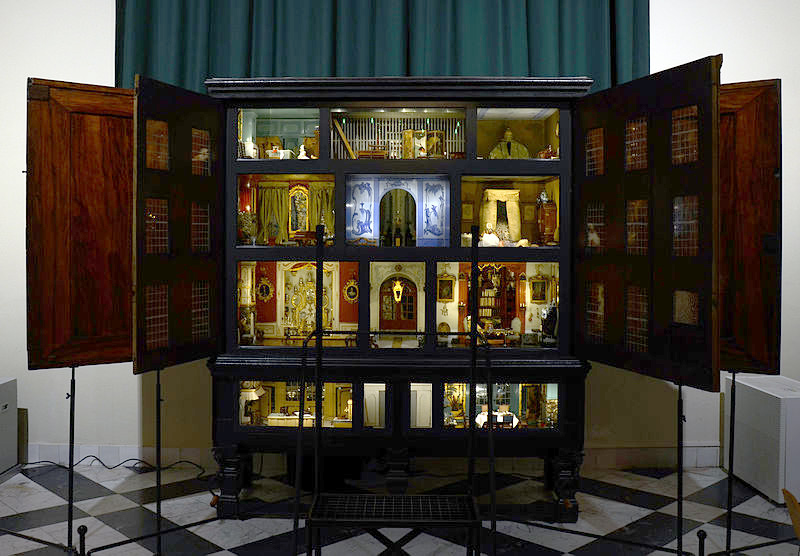
One of Sara Rothé's 18th century Dutch cabinet dollhouses

Surviving Dutch 17th century notable cabinet dollhouses include the Amsterdam, Netherlands 18th century dollhouses of Sara Rothé; one is in the Frans Hals Museum, and one is in the Gemeentemuseum Den Haag; the dollhouse of Petronella de la Court in Centraal Museum, and the dollhouse of Petronella Oortman in the Rijksmuseum Amsterdam. The Rijksmuseum estimates that Petronella Oortman spent twenty to thirty thousand guilders on her miniature house, which was nearly the price of a real house along one of Amsterdam's canals at that time. All these dollhouses shows the linen room (laundry room), kitchen, and bedrooms in great detail.

In Tampere in Finland, the Moomin Museum displays the Moomin house, a dollhouse created around the Moomin characters of Tove Jansson. The house was built by Jansson, Tuulikki Pietilä and Pentti Eistola and later donated to the town of Tampere. The museum also contains dozens of roomboxes with Moomin characters, all made by Tuulikki Pietilä. The Dollhouse Museum (German: Puppenhausmuseum) in Basel, Switzerland is the largest museum of its kind in Europe.

In Russia, the most famous dollhouse was made for Pavel Naschekin (1830s, now in the collection of National Pushkin Museum). In the United Kingdom, the Uppark Baby-house (ca. 1730) is on exhibit at Uppark, West Sussex, owned by The National Trust. The Nostell Priory Baby-house (ca. 1730) is on exhibit at Nostell Priory, Yorkshire, also owned by The National Trust. The Tate House (1760) is on exhibit in the Museum of Childhood in London, England.

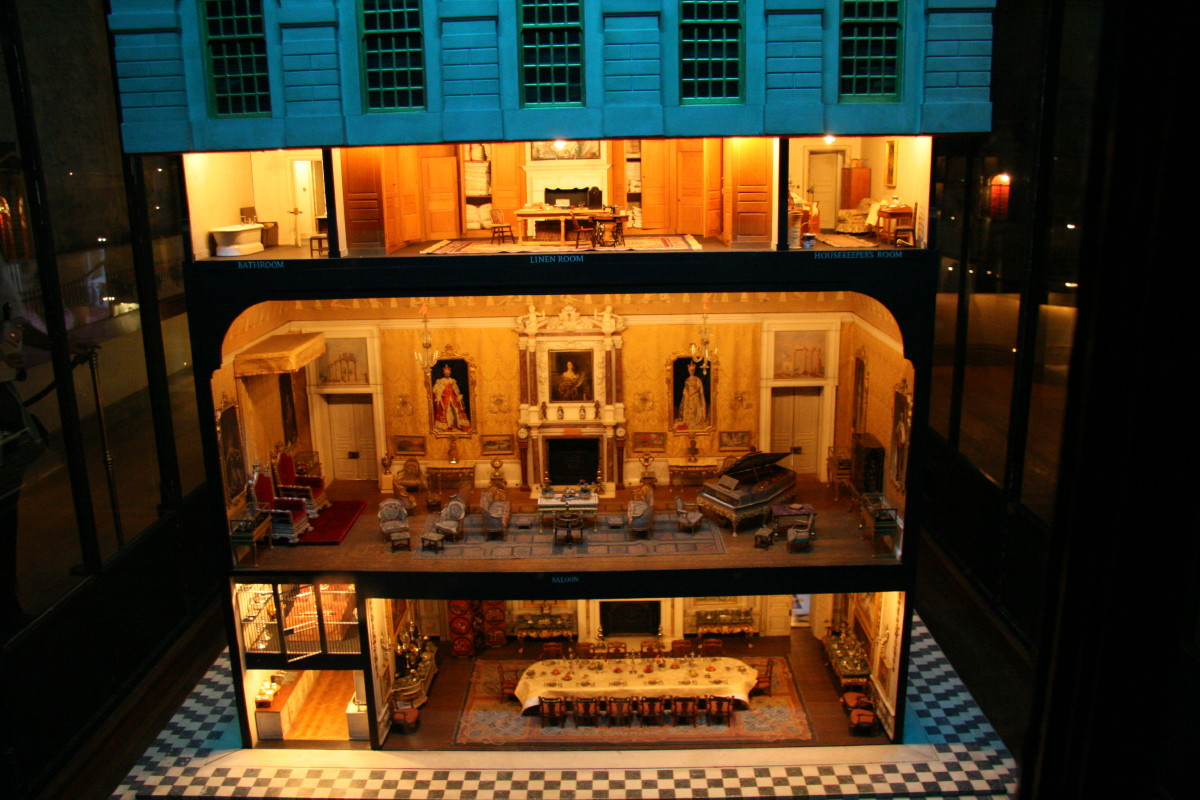
Queen Mary's Dolls' House constructed for Queen Mary in 1924

Queen Mary's Dolls' House was designed for Queen Mary in 1924 by Sir Edwin Lutyens, a leading architect of the time, and is on display at Windsor Castle. When first put on display it was visited by 1.6 million people in seven months. It is approximately 5' tall, contains 16 rooms, and required 4 years to construct. The dollhouse has working plumbing and lights and is filled with miniature items of the finest and most modern goods of the period. Writers like Sir Arthur Conan Doyle and Rudyard Kipling contributed special books which were written and bound in scale size.

Titania's Palace is on display in Egeskov Castle in Denmark, a miniature castle that was hand-built by James Hicks & Sons, Irish Cabinet Makers who were commissioned by Sir Neville Wilkinson from 1907 to 1922. The palace is 4' 1" tall, contains 18 rooms, and required 15 years to construct. It was built in Ireland but was won by Denmark in a bidding war in 1978 at Sotheby's London Auction house. Tara's Palace is located in the Tara's Palace Museum of Childhood in the grounds of Powerscourt Estate near Enniskerry, Ireland. It required 10 years to build, is 4'6" in height, contains 22 rooms, and was built by Ron McDonnell beginning in 1978 after he failed to secure the return of Titania's Palace to Ireland. It is furnished with miniature antiques.

The Stettheimer Dollhouse was constructed in New York City by Carrie Walter Stettheimer between 1916 and 1935. Many contemporary artists made miniatures of their art for the dollhouse, including Marcel Duchamp, Alexander Archipenko, George Bellows, Gaston Lachaise, and Marguerite Zorach. It is 28" high and contains 12 rooms, and is now located at the Museum of the City of New York. The 68 miniature Thorne Rooms room boxes, each with a different theme, were designed by Narcissa Niblack Thorne and furniture for them was created by craftsmen in the 1930s and 40s. They are now at the Art Institute of Chicago, Phoenix Art Museum and the Knoxville Museum of Art in Knoxville, Tennessee.

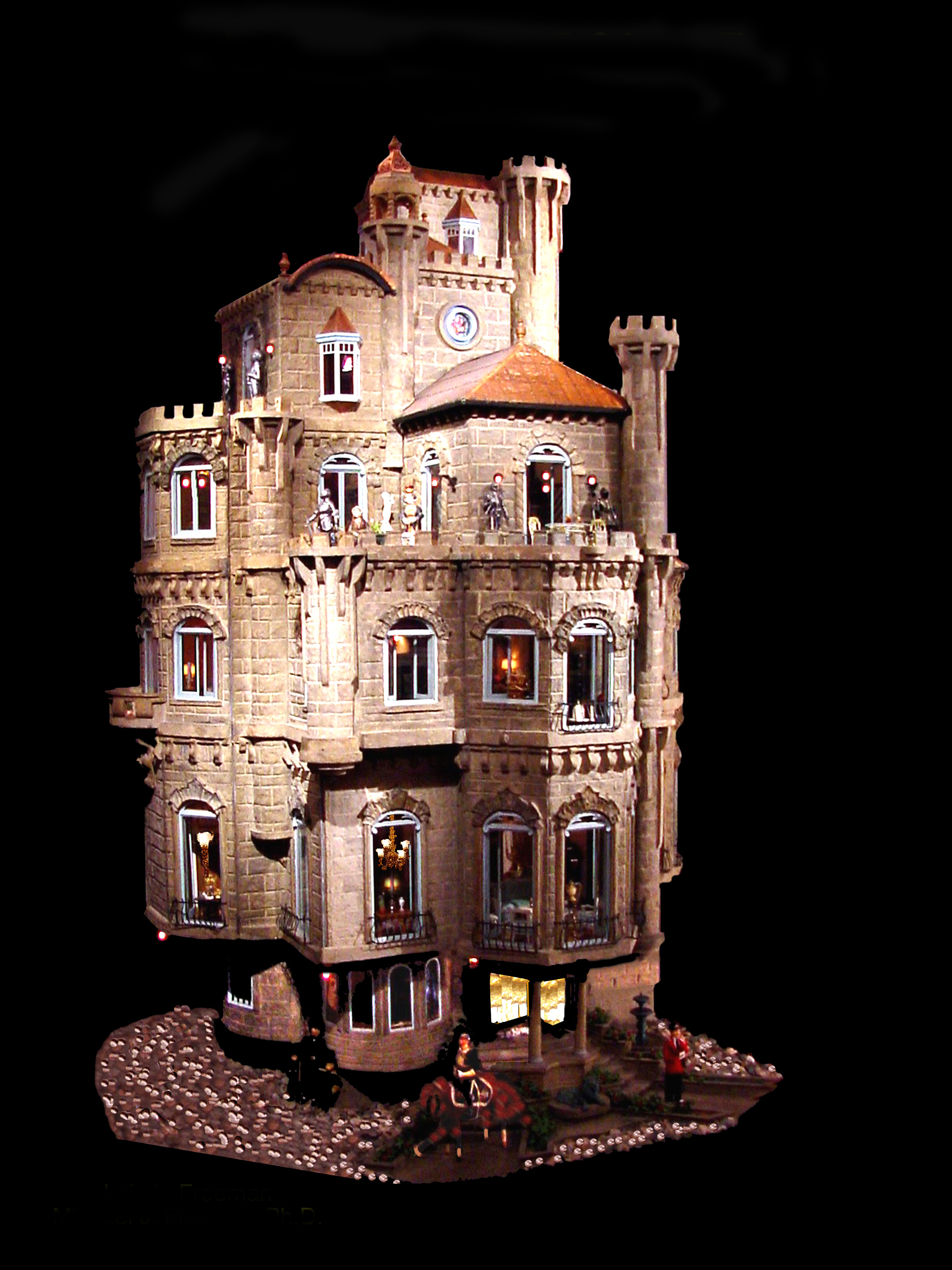
Exterior of the Astolat Dollhouse Castle, built between 1976 and 1986 in USA

American silent film actress Colleen Moore's dollhouse is called the Fairy Castle. It is 7' tall, has twelve rooms, and required 7 years to construct, beginning in 1928. In 2012 dollars, the fairy Castle would cost $7 million and when first put on tour it generated $9 million in revenue over a four-year period. It has been on display since the 1950s at the Museum of Science and Industry in Chicago, Illinois and is visited by an estimated 1.5 million people each year.

The Astolat Dollhouse Castle was inspired by Alfred Tennyson's poetry about the Lady of the Lake and built between 1974 and 1987 by miniaturist Elaine Diehl. It was appraised over $7 million in 2006 and at $8.5 million in 2015 primarily because of the upgrade to the interiors and pieces. It is 9' tall, has 29 rooms and is on display at the Nassau County Museum of Art on Long Island, New York. The Colleen Moore fairy Castle Dollhouse and the Astolat Dollhouse Castle were designed with fixed contiguous exterior walls to create a three-dimensional viewing effect.

== Women and doll houses ==
As interest in doll houses expanded during the seventeenth century, there was also a shift in the gender-oriented organization of the miniature houses towards a more feminine focus. There is a shift of viewing doll houses as a collectible “male-oriented artefact to a female-organized model of domesticity”. Dutch doll houses resembled cabinets with separate compartments of fully furnished rooms than actual houses, which represented the domestic household, “through the inclusion of amply-stocked linen rooms and kitchens”.

== Gallery ==
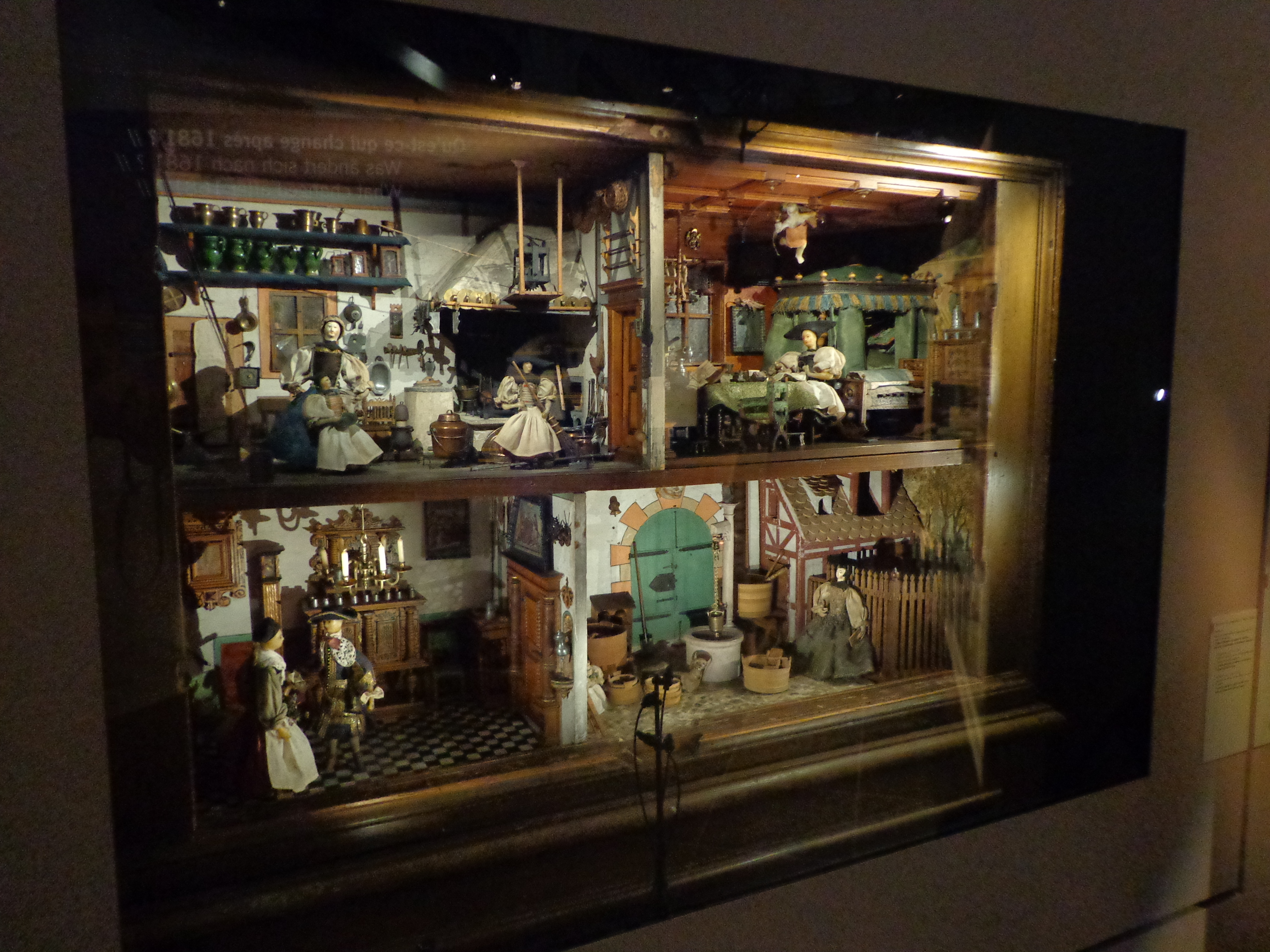
French dollhouse, 17th-century

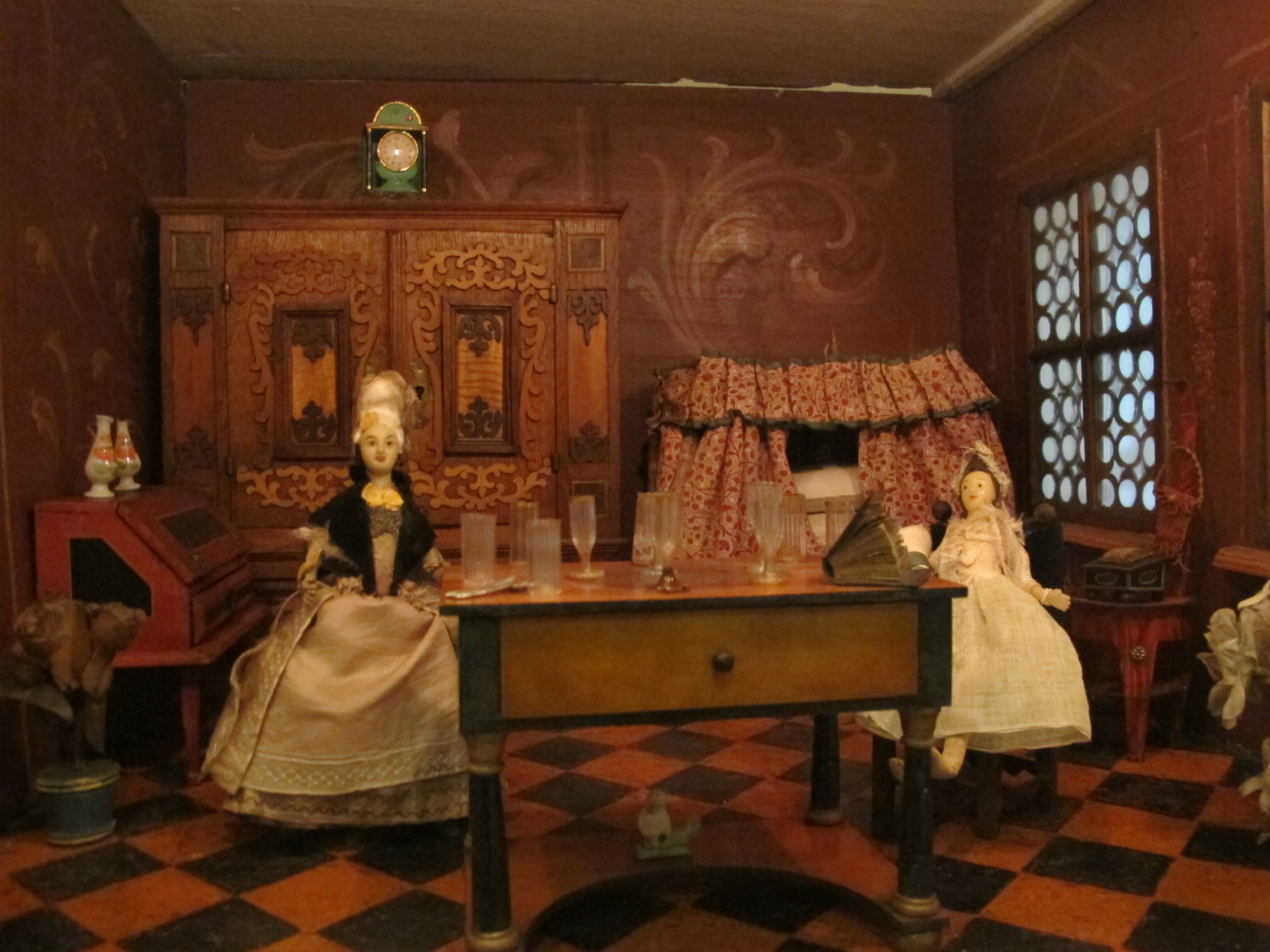
Dollhouse interior with dolls, Nuremberg, Germany, c. 1650–1700

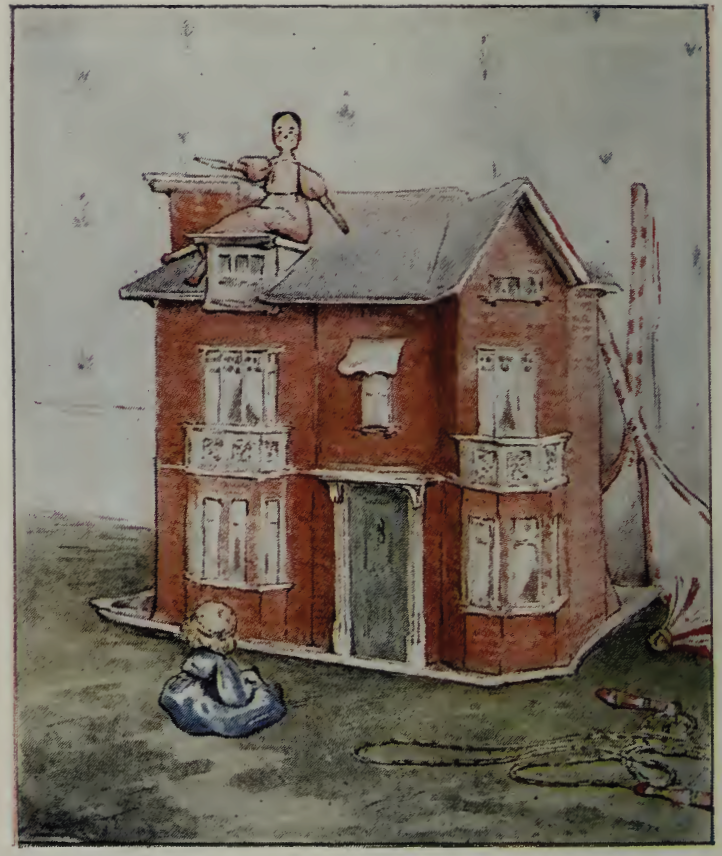
Illustration of dolls and dollhouse, by Beatrix Potter, from The Tale of Two Bad Mice, England, 1904

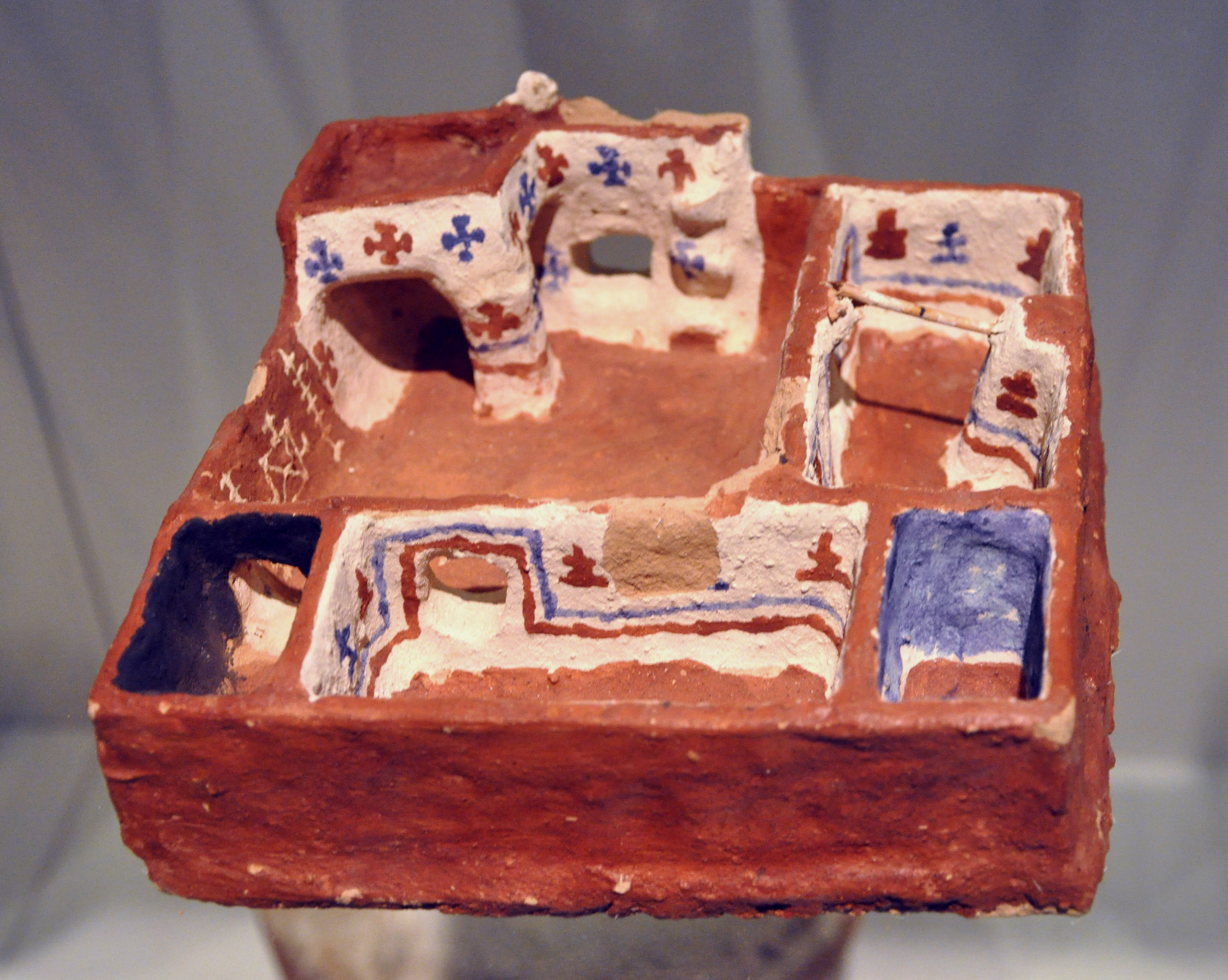
Dollhouse made of clay, Mauritania, 20th century

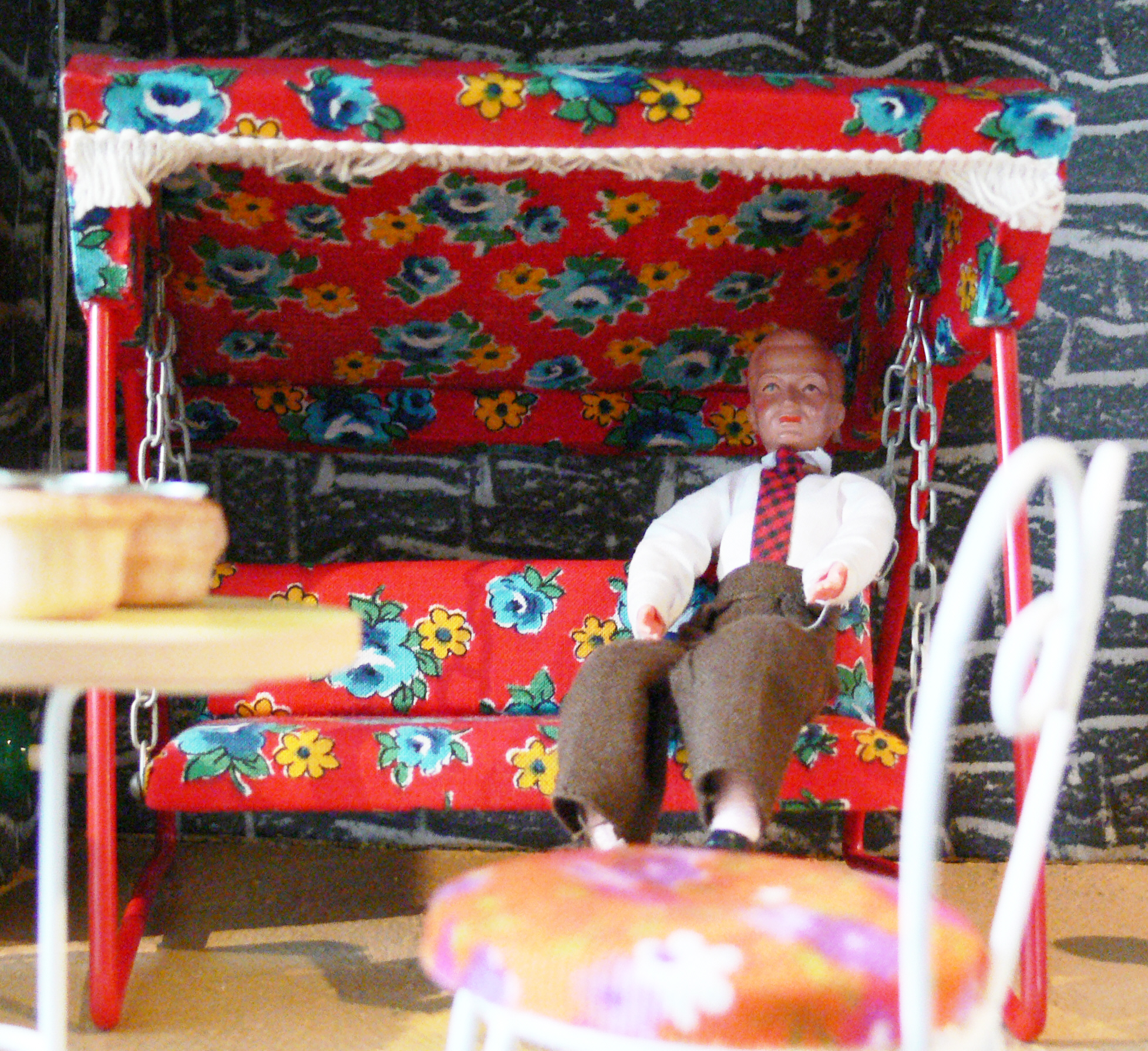
Detail of dollhouse terrace, Germany, 1960s

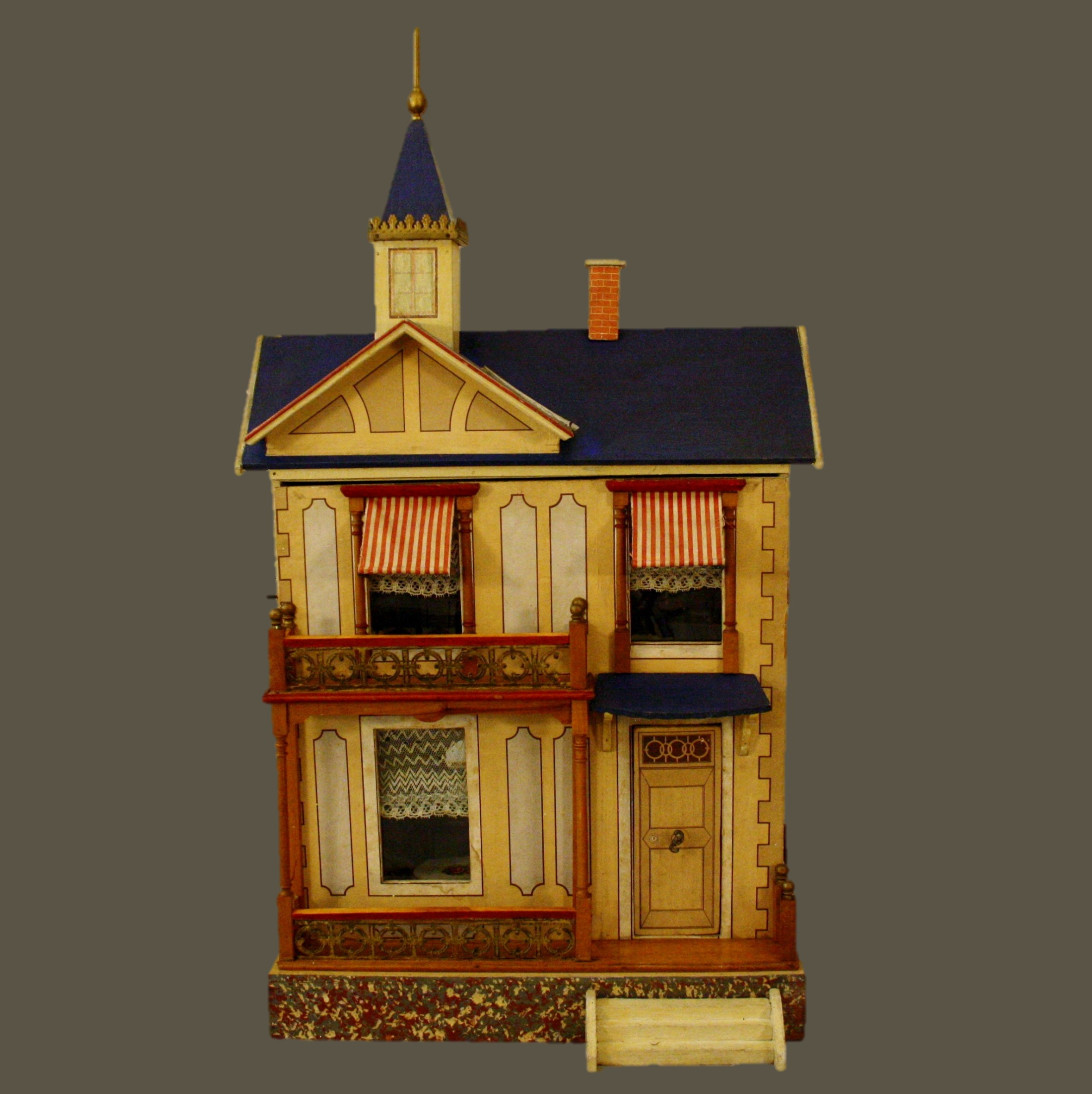
A Deauville Dollhouse, Villard & Weill, France - 1912

Mass-produced Swedish wooden dollhouse with wooden furniture, 1:18 scale, Lundby, 1961–64

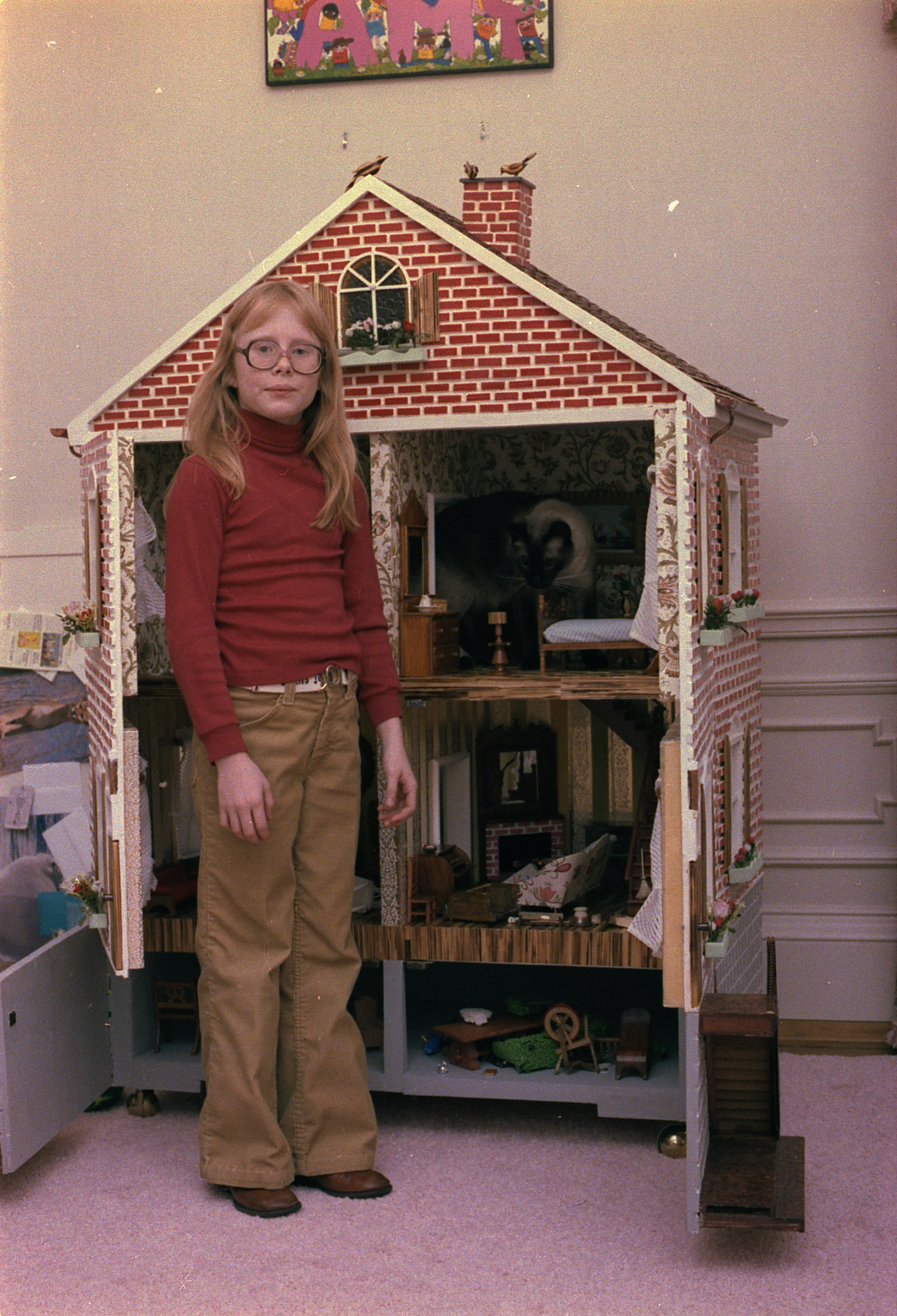
Amy Carter pictured in the White House with an American dollhouse, 1978

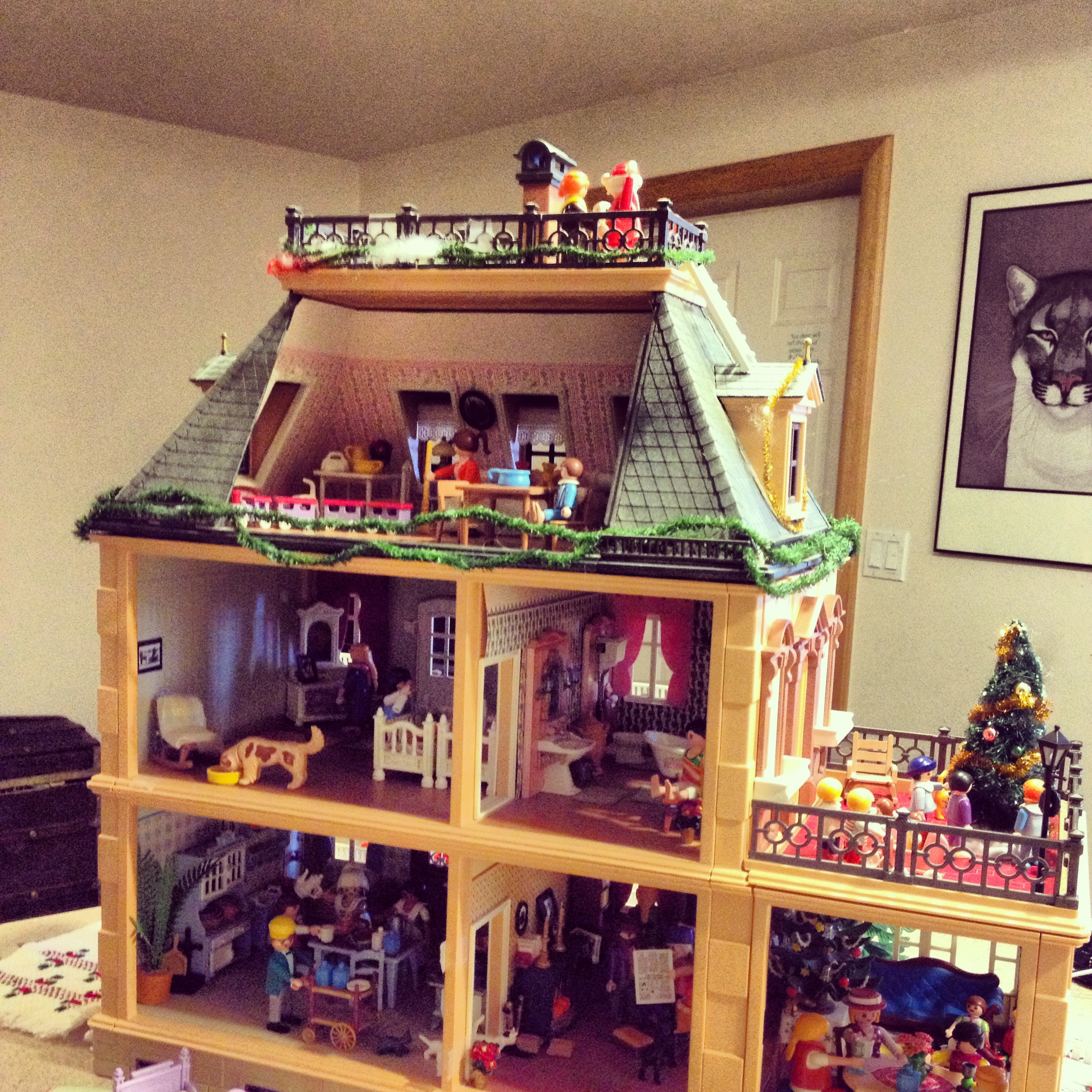
Mass-produced German plastic Playmobil dollhouse, late 20th/early 21st century

== See also ==
- Mini Brands
