= Lundby Old Church =

Church building in Gothenburg, Sweden

Coordinates: 57°42′46″N 11°54′55″E

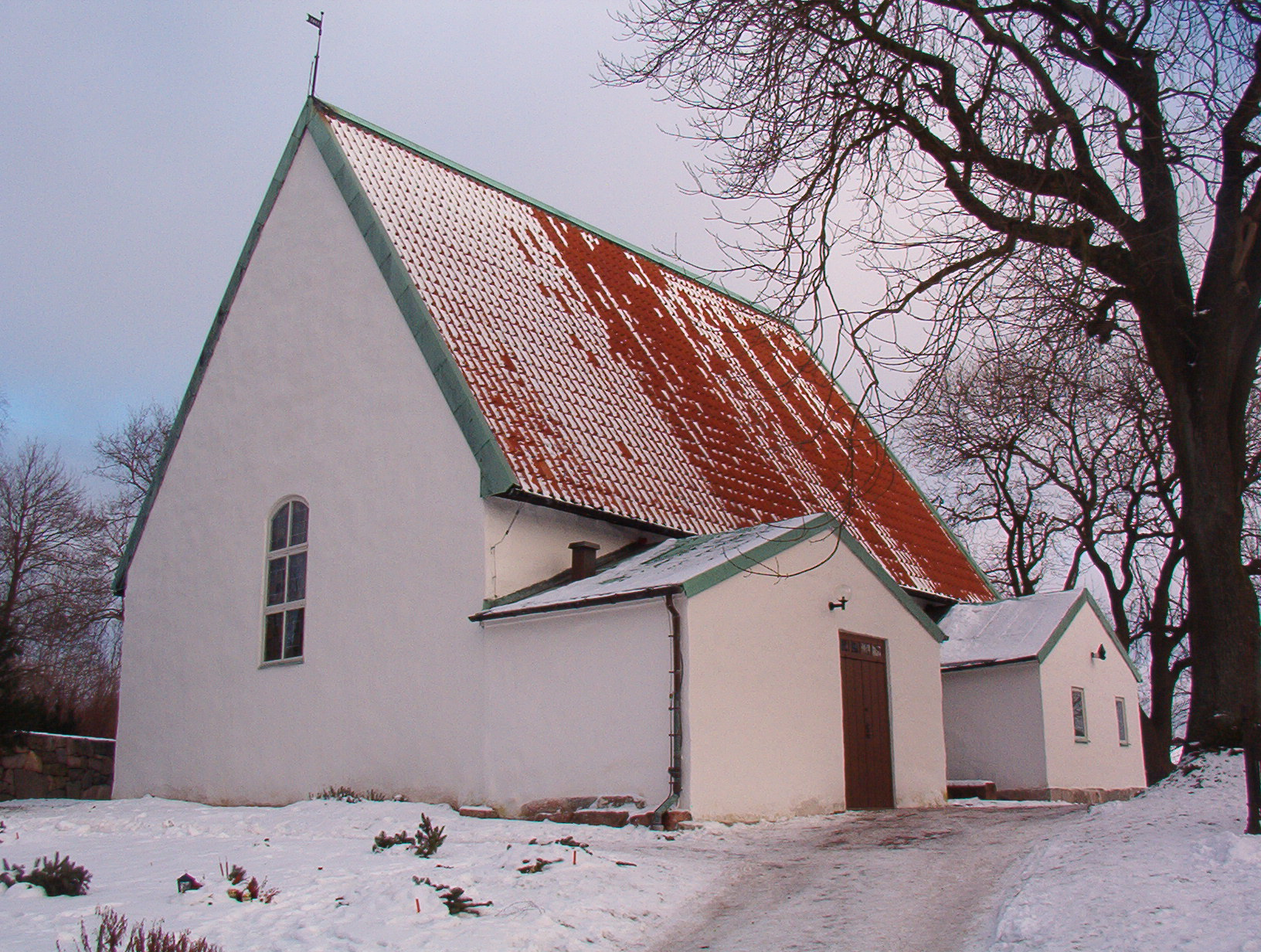
Lundby Old Church

The Lundby Old Church (Swedish: Lundby gamla kyrka) is a church in Lundby, a borough of Gothenburg, Sweden. It belongs to the parish of Lundby in the Diocese of Gothenburg. It is one of the seven preserved medieval churches in Gothenburg, and the only one of them representing Gothic architecture. It originates from the 14th century, but the bell tower had not been erected until 1634. The church has been renovated many times, most recently in 1998.

The coats of arms of the noble families Cronacker, Eketrä, Stålhandske and Ihre can be found in the church. The Stålhandske and Ihre families built their own grave chapels at the southern wall; the Ihre chapel is still preserved today, while the Stålhandske chapel was torn down and the coffins were moved to the family grave in the surrounding churchyard.

== History ==
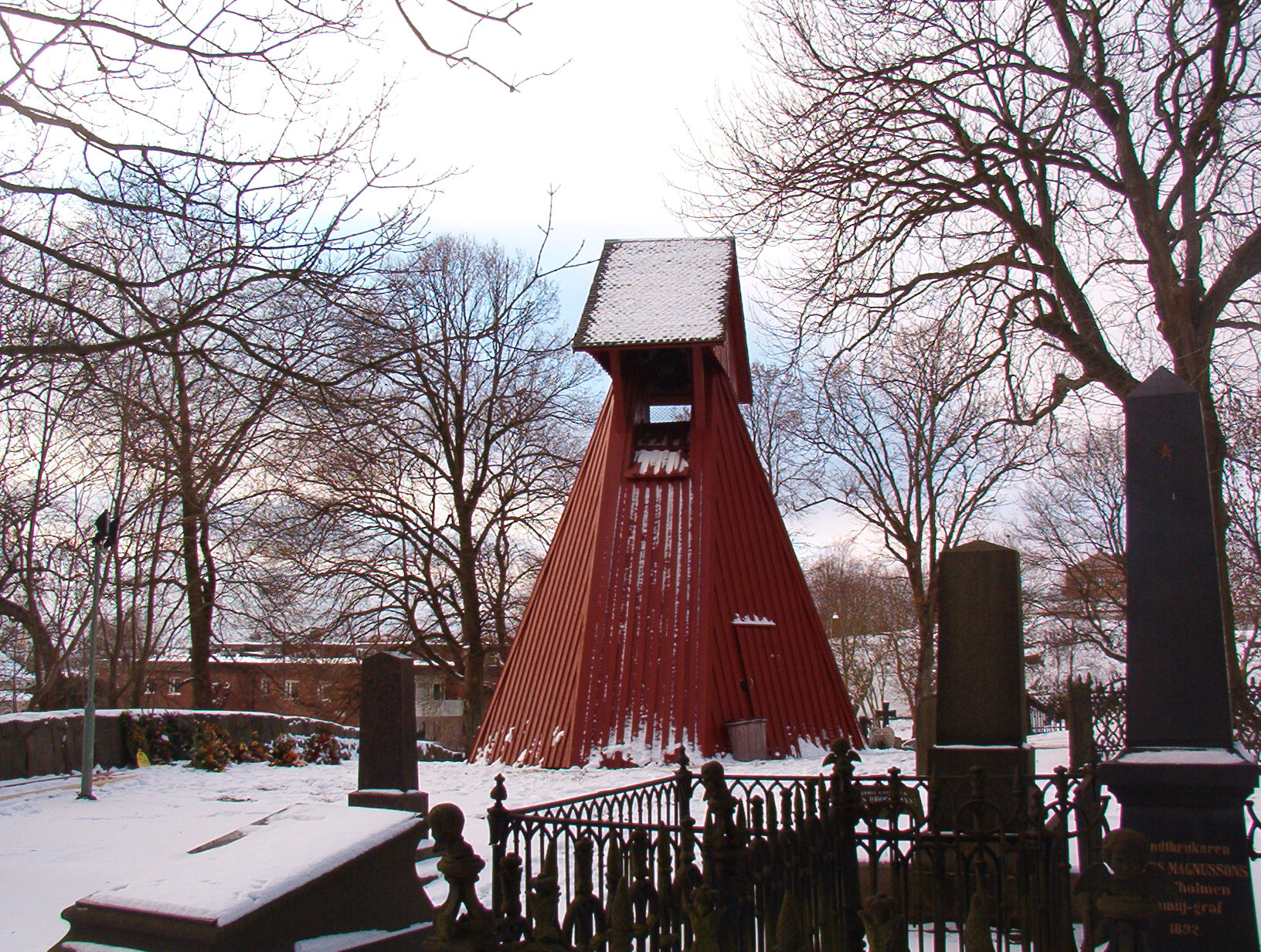
The bell tower and the churchyard

The church was probably built in the late 14th century. Its Romanesque baptismal font, however, comes from an older wooden church that had existed in the same place and whose remains were not discovered until the early 20th century.

Since the mid-17th century, when the bell tower next to the building was erected, the church has been renovated many times. For example, until the 19th century it had no windows. Following the erection of a new church in the neighborhood in 1886, the Lundby Old Church was supposed to be torn down. It was saved thanks to protests by dean Peter Rydholm. The church was equipped with electricity in 1934 and with a modern ventilation system in 1998, which has been the latest major renovation up to this time.

== Churchyard ==
The church is surrounded by a small churchyard, called Lundby Old Churchyard (Swedish: Lundby gamla kyrkogård). It has an area of 1.7 hectares and houses around 1700 graves. The first records of it come from 1788, and the oldest existing map from 1856. The oldest tombstones, however, bear dates from the late 17th century. The area has probably been used as a burial ground since the 13th century, as long as the church has existed.
