= Nuremberg kitchen =

Type of dollhouse with only a kitchen

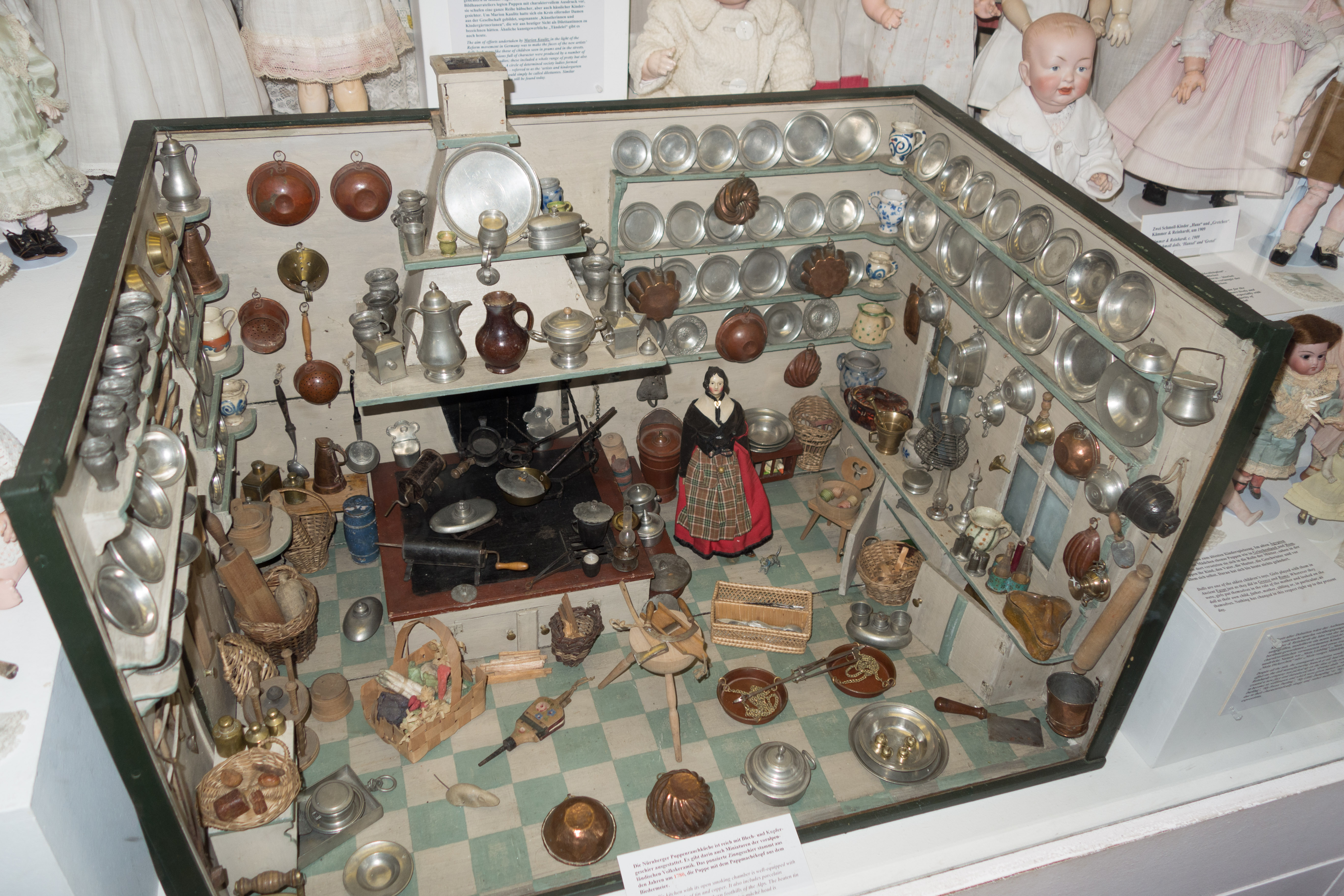
A Nuremberg kitchen

Nuremberg kitchen is the traditional English name for a specific type of dollhouse, similar to a room box, usually limited to a single room depicting a kitchen. The name references the city of Nuremberg, the center of the nineteenth-century German toy industry. In German the toy is known as a Puppenküche (literally "dolls' kitchen").

== Description ==
Most surviving examples show variations on a standard form: a single reduced-scale room with the front wall and ceiling missing, rather like a miniaturized stage set, allowing convenient access to the interior and an unobstructed view of the minuscule items within. Often the side walls flare out from the back at wide angles, creating a trapezoid floorplan and presenting a more dramatic display of the contents. Some might have a roof above or a pantry to one side, but these are exceptions. Typically, but not always, the fittings are arranged symmetrically, with a cooking range in the center of the rear wall (a raised masonry hearth with a chimney in early versions, or a metal stove in later ones), with cupboards, shelves, and other storage furniture to either side. They often house an abundant collection of pots, pans, and dishes filling or even overflowing the space. Later nineteenth-century examples are often highly embellished with decorative trimmings. Many of these features pertain more to making these miniatures seem attractive than they do to accurately depicting full-scale kitchens.

== History ==
Nuremberg kitchens date back at least to 1572, when one was given to Dorothea and Anna, the Princesses of Saxony, daughters of Augustus, Elector of Saxony aged five and ten. Since then, many adult collectors as well as children have owned multi-room dollhouses, but these one-room kitchens seem to have almost always been thought of as girls' playthings. They reached the height of their popularity in the 1800s. In the early part of the century they were assembled by artisans working from their homes, who produced a remarkably large volume of toys made by hand. By the later part of the century they were being manufactured in even greater numbers in industrialized factories by such firms as Moritz Gottschalk, Gebrüder Bing, and Märklin.

German mothers would pass on their childhood kitchens to their daughters, which became a widespread practice by the nineteenth century. By this custom, Nuremberg kitchens that might have been very up-to-date when first made would be noticeably old-fashioned after decades of being handed down as a family heirloom. Similarly, while many nineteenth-century German toy manufacturers offered miniature versions of all the latest kitchen gadgets, their catalogs also showed toy kitchens that went virtually unchanged for decades, as did many of their pots, pans, and dishes. Thus, late nineteenth- and early twentieth-century examples often incorporate components that were distinctly anachronistic by that time.

Nuremberg kitchens were also often associated with the Christmas holidays. In many German families, they were only brought out to be played with at Christmastime, when they served as part of the traditional holiday decorations and as a seasonal toy. It was popular to give little girls items for their toy kitchens as Christmas presents, on their birthdays and similar occasions.

The purpose of Nuremberg kitchens has usually been explained by dolls' house historians as meant to teach girls lessons in housekeeping and cooking. However, these model kitchens are probably better understood as meant to encourage girls to adopt traditionally gendered social roles by making housekeeping seem fascinating through the appeal of attractive and impressive playthings. It would have been much easier for mothers to teach their daughters how to cook by taking them to the real kitchens in their homes and having them observe and assist with preparing meals than to provide miniaturized counterparts. Also, given that these toy kitchens had layouts that were more aesthetic and theatrical than accurately representational of real kitchens in full scale houses, that they often evoked nostalgia as family antiques or as deliberately old-fashioned new products, and that they were often associated more with the festivities of Christmas than with the practicalities of everyday life, Nuremberg kitchens were probably not truly meant primarily to provide girls with practical training in the skills of homemaking. Instead, they were intended to generate wonder and amusement, to make kitchens seem magical, and thereby inspire girls to anticipate and desire their traditionally expected future roles as homemakers.
