= Stettheimer Dollhouse =

Dollhouse

The Stettheimer Dollhouse is a two-story, twelve-room dollhouse, created by Carrie Walter Stettheimer (1869-1944) over the course of two decades, from 1916 to 1935. It contains miniature art made for the dollhouse by artists like Marcel Duchamp, Alexander Archipenko, George Bellows, Gaston Lachaise, and Marguerite Zorach.

== History ==
Carrie and her sisters Florine and Henrietta (Ettie) lived with their mother Rosetta in New York City; Florine was an artist and Ettie an author, and the family attracted a celebrated group of artists, writers, and critics during the first half of the twentieth century.

Carrie was inspired to begin her dollhouse in 1916; during their summer vacation in upstate New York, the sisters (and other upper-class visitors to Lower Saranac) contributed items to a fund-raising bazaar to benefit local children affected by a polio epidemic. Using wooden boxes from a grocer, Carrie created a dollhouse with found objects and scraps. When the family returned home to New York City, Carrie began her own dollhouse.

== Art Collection ==
Perhaps the most notable feature of the dollhouse is its art collection. Many of the Stettheimers' artist friends made tiny copies of their paintings and sculptures for the dollhouse; Marcel Duchamp, for example, made a miniature copy of his Nude Descending a Staircase. Other artists who created works for the Dollhouse include Alexander Archipenko, George Bellows, Gaston Lachaise, and Marguerite Zorach.

Even in death the Stettheimers attracted artists; Pop artist Andy Warhol wrote about the Stettheimers in his 1980 book Popism: the Warhol '60s. "Florine Stettheimer was a wealthy primitive painter, a friend of Marcel Duchamp’s, who’d had a one-woman show at the Museum of Modern Art in 1946, and her sister Carrie had made some fabulous dollhouses [sic] that I loved at the Museum of the City of New York."

== Museum of the City of New York ==
After her mother's death in 1935, Carrie stopped working on the dollhouse and some rooms were left unfinished. Her sister Ettie (who survived both Florine and Carrie) donated the dollhouse to the Museum of the City of New York in 1945; she arranged the unfinished rooms (the Art Gallery or Ballroom and the Dining Room) as she thought her sister would have wanted them. The dollhouse is about 28 inches tall, 50 inches long, and 35 inches wide.

== Bibliography ==
- Clark, Sheila W. 2009. The Stettheimer dollhouse. San Francisco: Pomegranate.
- Museum of the City of New York. 1947. The Stettheimer doll's house.
- Noble, John. 1976. A fabulous dollhouse of the twenties: the famous Stettheimer dollhouse at the Museum of the City of New York. New York: Dover Publications.
