= Lundby, Gothenburg =

Borough of Gothenburg, Sweden

Coordinates: 57.72501°N 11.91167°E

Lundby is a suburb and borough of Gothenburg, Sweden. It is located in the central part of the Hisingen island, stretching along the northern shore of the Göta River. It is the original home of the dollhouse manufacturing company Lundby and the home of Volvo Trucks and Volvo Penta.

There were 38,000 people residing in Lundby on 1 January 2009.

One of the few preserved medieval churches in the city of Gothenburg, Lundby Old Church, is located in Lundby.
