= Preben Lundbye =

Danish footballer and manager (born 1950)

Personal information
- Full name: Preben Lundbye
- Date of birth: 1 April 1950 (age 76)
- Place of birth: Denmark
- Position: Defender

Team information
- Current team: Holstebro BK (Manager)

Youth career
- Hvidovre IF

Senior career*
Years	Team	Apps	(Gls)
1970–1975	Hvidovre IF	13	(?)

Managerial career
- Bryrup IF
- Herning Fremad
- Viborg FF (assistant)
- 1992–1994: Silkeborg IF (assistant)
- 1994–2007: Silkeborg IF (academy)
- 2007: Silkeborg IF
- 2007–2008: Kjellerup IF
- 2010–2012: Holstebro Boldklub
- * Club domestic league appearances and goals as of 13:17, 3 April 2011 (UTC)

Preben Lundbye (born 1 April 1950) is a Danish football coach previously for Holstebro Boldklub and Silkeborg IF. As a football player for Hvidovre IF he won the Danish Championship back in 1973. He ended his career in 1975 due to an injury.

He has a degree in pedagogy and psychology.
