= Room box =

Display box used for three-dimensional miniature scale models

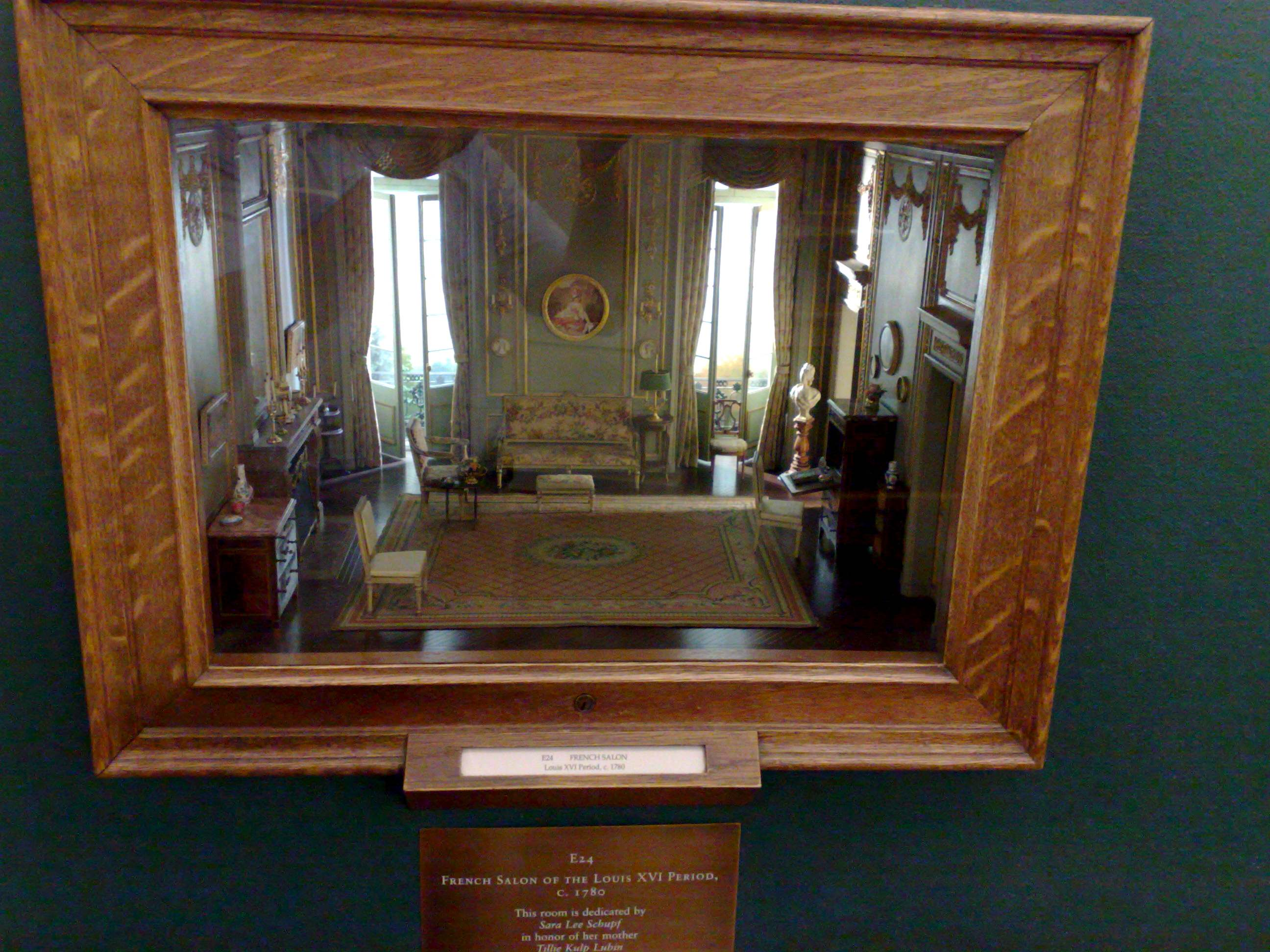
One of the 68 Thorne Rooms, elaborate room boxes designed by Narcissa Niblack Thorne in the 1930s and 40s

A room box is a display box used for three-dimensional miniature scale environments, or scale models. Although the name would suggest room boxes generally only represent typical rooms such as those found in houses or other buildings (bedrooms, kitchens, offices, etc.), room boxes are used for all sorts of environments – exterior views as well as interior ones, realistic ones as well as fantastical ones. While some miniaturists concentrate their efforts specifically on room boxes, many use them to take a break from larger projects, such as dollhouses or miniature villages, to create a smaller environment on a different theme. A room box can be tailored to one’s interests or mirror an important step in life - for example, a bakery or restaurant scene might be created by or for a baker or cook, and a wedding dress storefront might be created for a bride to be or as a reminiscence of one's wedding. Making a room box is often a first step to learning new techniques in miniature making; such projects are popular at miniaturists' events where attendees have only 1–2 days to make and finish a project. Once techniques are perfected in these smaller settings, craftspersons and hobbyists often reapply them to larger projects.

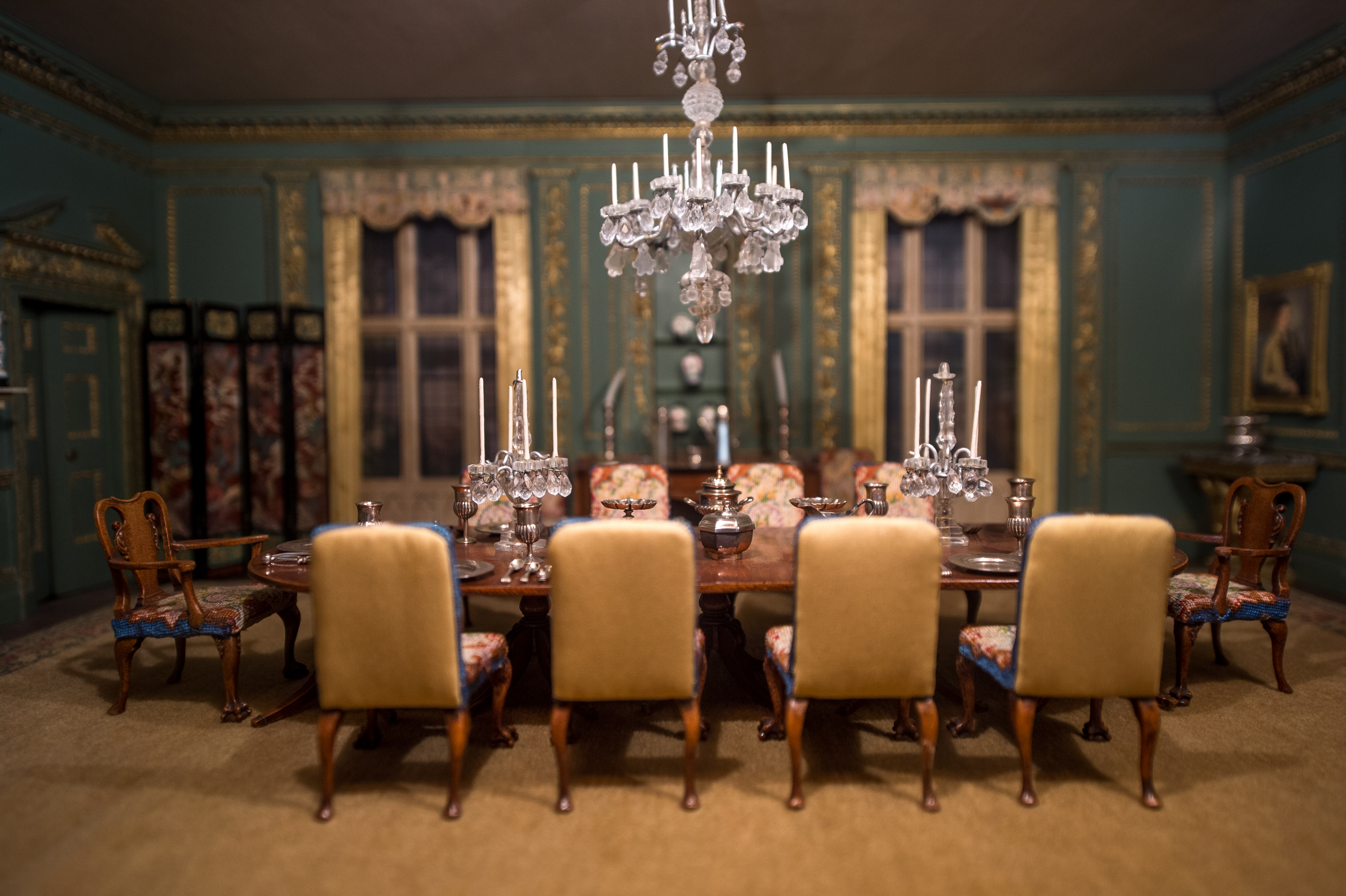
Ruth McChesney miniature room, Carnegie Museum of Art, Pittsburgh

Room boxes are a cost- and time-effective way to make miniature settings without attempting larger setups such as a dollhouse or train set. Commercially bought room boxes tend to be made of wood, pressed wood products or plywood, with the top and front window made of removable clear acrylic that lets in light and enables access and viewing from two perspectives. Dimensions usually meet standard dollhouse proportions ("1:12 scale" in dollhouse speak means that 1" in the dollhouse world represents 1' in the real world), but anyone can make a room box from a leftover shoebox, orange crate, etc. and adapt an idea to suit the box's scale. Since any material can be used, whether leftover or new, people of all economic classes express themselves through this craft.

One elaborate example of 1:12 scale miniature rooms are the 68 miniature Thorne Rooms, each with a different theme. They were designed by Narcissa Niblack Thorne and furniture for them was created by craftsmen in the 1930s and 1940s. They are now at the Art Institute of Chicago, Phoenix Art Museum. As evidenced in the recent increase in craft book and magazine publishing on different types of miniatures, interest in making room-boxes for miniature settings has steadily grown since the 1990s. Room boxes have even found a place during prime-time television: the winter 2007 season of CSI: Crime Scene Investigation included a clever storyline recurring throughout the season, where a murderer named The Miniature Killer leaves clues for investigators in the form of intricately made 3-D room boxes showing scenes of the crimes she committed, reproduced in scale miniature.

== See also ==
- Model
- Scale model
- Dollhouse
- Model building
