= Anne Wilson (artist) =

American visual artist (born 1949)

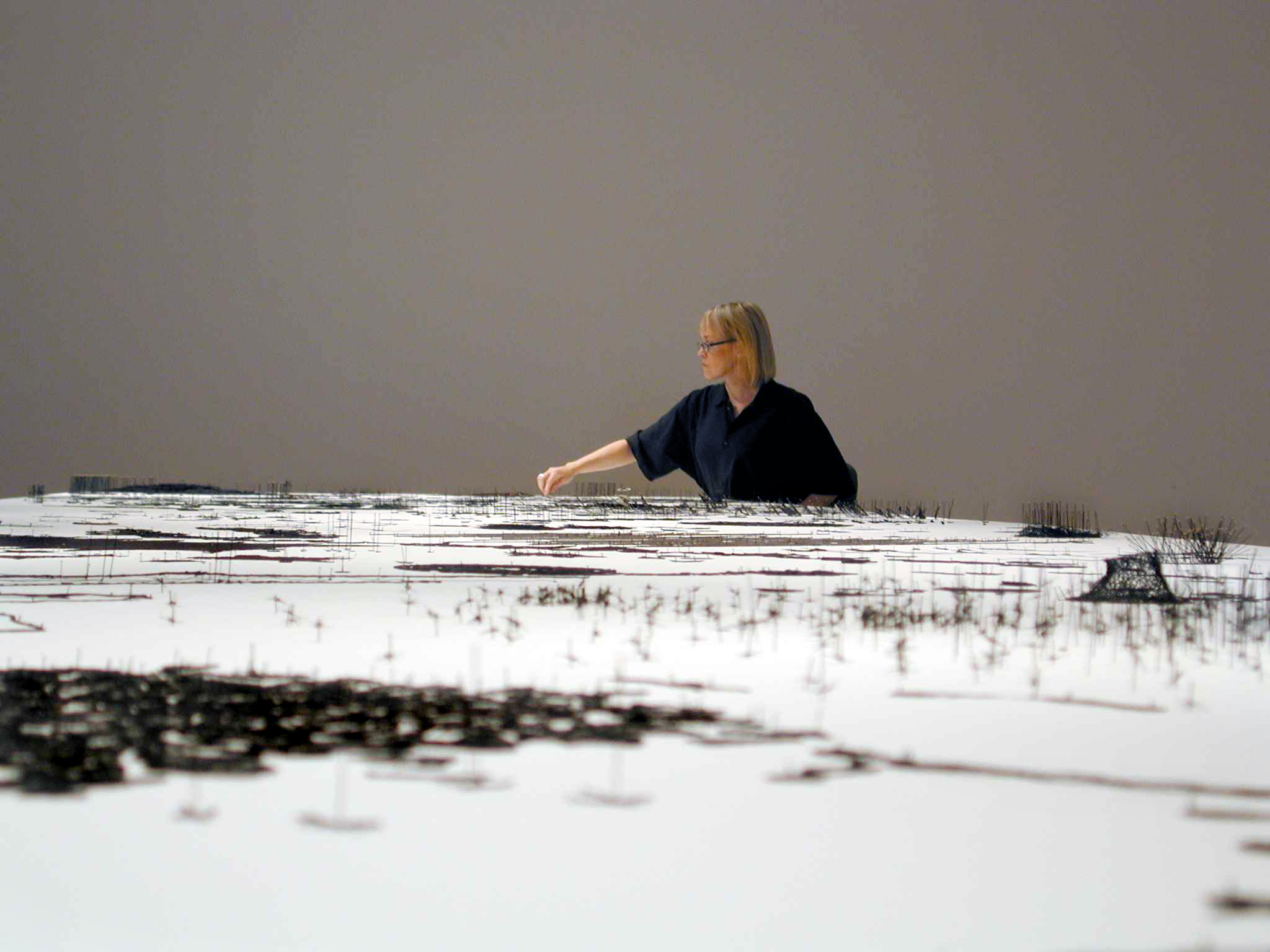
- Anne Wilson installing Topologies (2002–ongoing)
- Born: 1949 (age 76–77)
- Education: M.F.A., Cranbrook Academy of Art, B.F.A., California College of the Arts

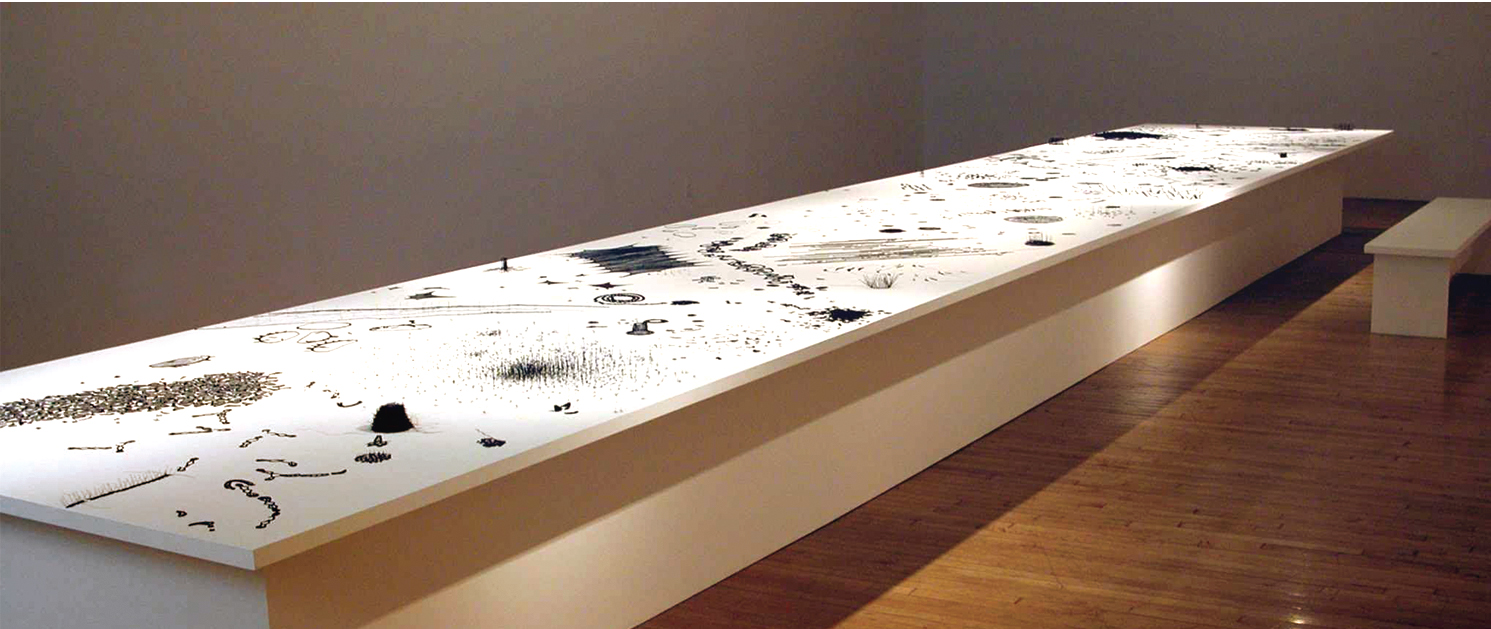
Anne Wilson, Topologies, 2002-ongoing

Anne Wilson (born 1949) is a Chicago-based visual artist. Wilson creates sculpture, drawings, Internet projects, photography, performance, and DVD stop motion animations employing table linens, bed sheets, human hair, lace, thread and wire. Her work extends the traditional processes of fiber art (techniques such as stitching, crocheting, and knitting) to other media. Wilson is a professor in the Department of Fiber and Material Studies at The School of the Art Institute of Chicago.

== Life and work ==
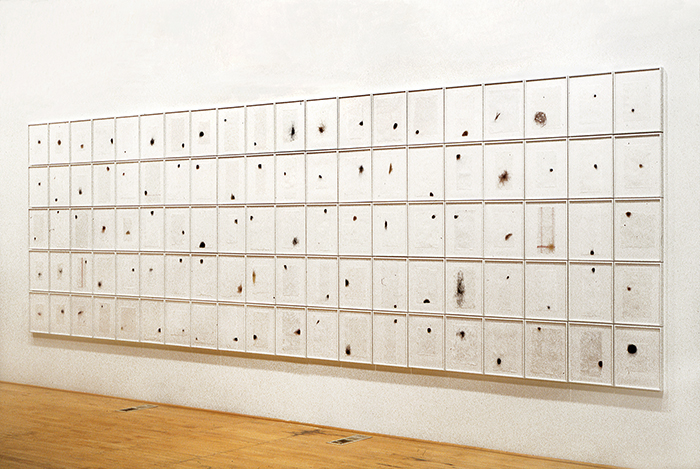
Anne Wilson, A Chronicle of Days, 1997-98. Collection 21st Century Museum of Contemporary Art, Kanazawa, Japan

Anne Wilson was born in Detroit, Michigan in 1949. At 15, she attended George School, a Quaker boarding school in Pennsylvania, where she received training in feminist theory and the philosophies of passive resistance through the study of Gandhi's teachings on non-violent politics. In her later research, Wilson remarked that her lessons at George School, especially Gandhi's exhortation to all Indians that they must practice spinning—for social, political, economic and spiritual reasons—profoundly influenced her life and artistic practice.

Anne Wilson's artwork explores personal and public practices of ritual and social systems, ideas of de-construction and re-construction in both microcosmic and macrocosmic worlds of public and private architecture, as well as themes of time and loss.

Wilson received a B.F.A. from the Cranbrook Academy of Art and a M.F.A. from the California College of the Arts (CCA) where she pursued interdisciplinary studies in the visual arts. At CCA, Wilson developed an understanding of art within a cultural context, a way of thinking emphasized by CCA instructor, art historian and anthropologist Dr. Ruth Boyer. Subsequently, Wilson's graduate research focused on temporary textile architecture such as the Zulu indlu and the Sub-Saharan African black tent. For Wilson these interests intersected with the popular concerns of generative systems, such as the methods being pioneered by artist Buckminster Fuller. During this time, Wilson was also influenced by the international art fabric movement, including artists such as Magdalena Abakanowicz, Ritzi and Peter Jacobi, Olga de Amaral, and Ed Rossbach.

During the 1970s while living in Berkeley, California, Wilson argued for the contemporary relevance of fiber and textile processes alongside more conventional fine art materials and techniques. Wilson began using hair as a fiber material in place of thread in 1988. Her works such as Hair Work and A Chronicle of Days consist of daily stitching where the artist "stained" clean white scraps of cloth with small patches of hair-based needlework. Wilson began inviting audience participation with her project Hairinquiry (1996–1999). Hairinquiry collected responses to the questions: How does it feel to lose your hair? What does it mean to cut your hair? The project was later archived through an online website.

In 2002, Wilson began the series Topologies (2002-ongoing) at the Whitney Museum of American Art's Biennial exhibition. In Topologies, expansive networks of found black lace are deconstructed to create large horizontal topographies. Some of the structures are formed by Wilson from computer-mediated scans of lace fragments that are manipulated and re-materialized by hand stitching. The form of Topologies is inspired by forms of physical and electronic networks, city structures, immateriality, biology and the urban sprawl.

In 2010, Wilson produced one of her most ambitious installations at the Knoxville Museum of Art in East Tennessee. Local Industry, a central component of the exhibition Anne Wilson: Wind/Rewind/Weave, was a site-specific installation as a collaborative "textile factory". From January 22 through April 25, 2010, visitors to the Knoxville Museum of Art worked together to produce a bolt of cloth. Wilson conceived of Wind/Rewind/Weave as a meditation on labor, acknowledging the specific geographic location of the Knoxville Museum of Art in the historical heartland of both hand weaving traditions and textile mill production in the United States. The Local Industry cloth, 75.9 feet (23.1 m) long, was on display at the Knoxville Museum of Art in 2011.

Also related to textile production in content, Wilson has choreographed 4 thread walking performances, conceptual movement works based upon weaving (Wind-Up: Walking the Warp Chicago, Rhona Hoffman Gallery, 2008; Wind-Up: Walking the Warp Houston, Contemporary Arts Museum Houston, 2010; Walking the Warp Manchester, Whitworth Art Gallery, Manchester, England, 2012; and To Cross (Walking New York), The Drawing Center, New York, 2014). In all her performances, Wilson is working through direct physical participation to think about time, labor, art, and cultural production.

Wilson continues her hair and cloth-works practice, alongside the creation of horizontal topographies, installations, and performances. New works were included in her solo exhibition, Dispersions, at the Rhona Hoffman Gallery in 2013, and Fiber: Sculpture 1960-Present originating at the ICA Boston in 2014. In 2015-16 her work was included in Pathmakers: Women in Art, Craft and Design, Midcentury and Today originating at the Museum of Arts and Design in NYC, and Art_Textiles at the Whitworth Art Gallery in Manchester, England. In 2016 she opened a solo exhibition at the James Harris Gallery in Seattle.

== Exhibitions ==
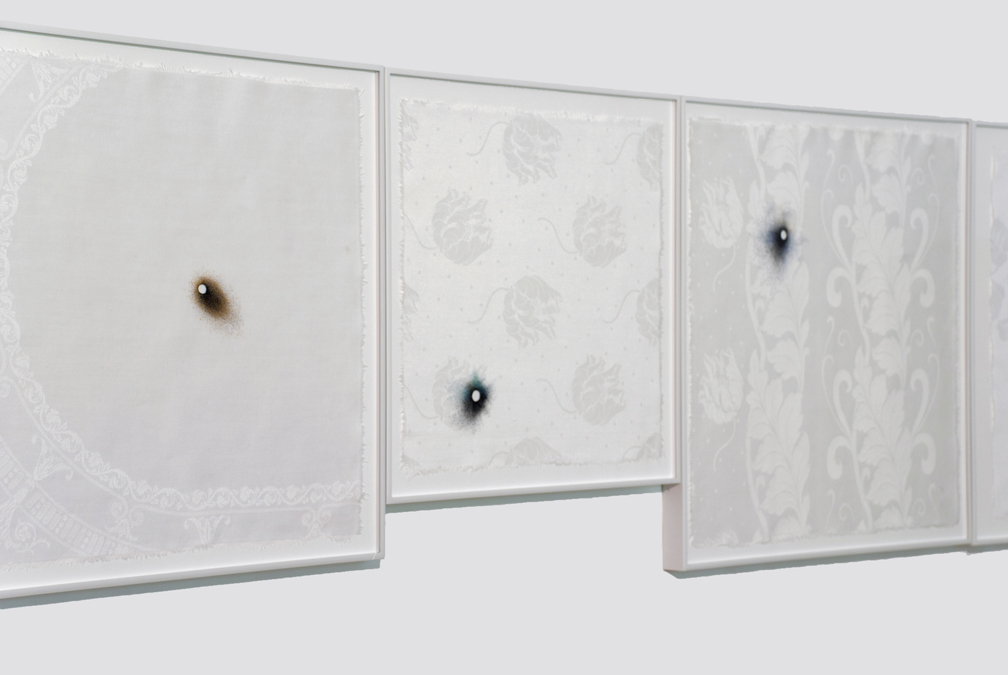
Anne Wilson, Dispersions (installation), 2013, thread, hair, cloth, white frames. Rhona Hoffman Gallery, Chicago

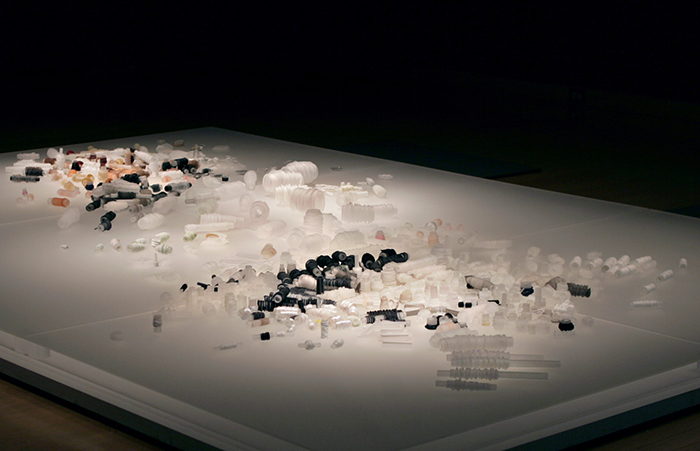
Anne Wilson, Rewinds, 2010, glass. Rhona Hoffman Gallery, Chicago

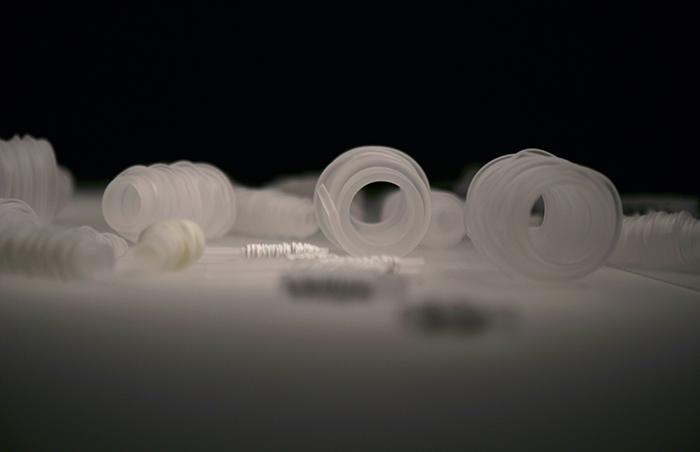
Anne Wilson, Rewinds, 2010, glass.

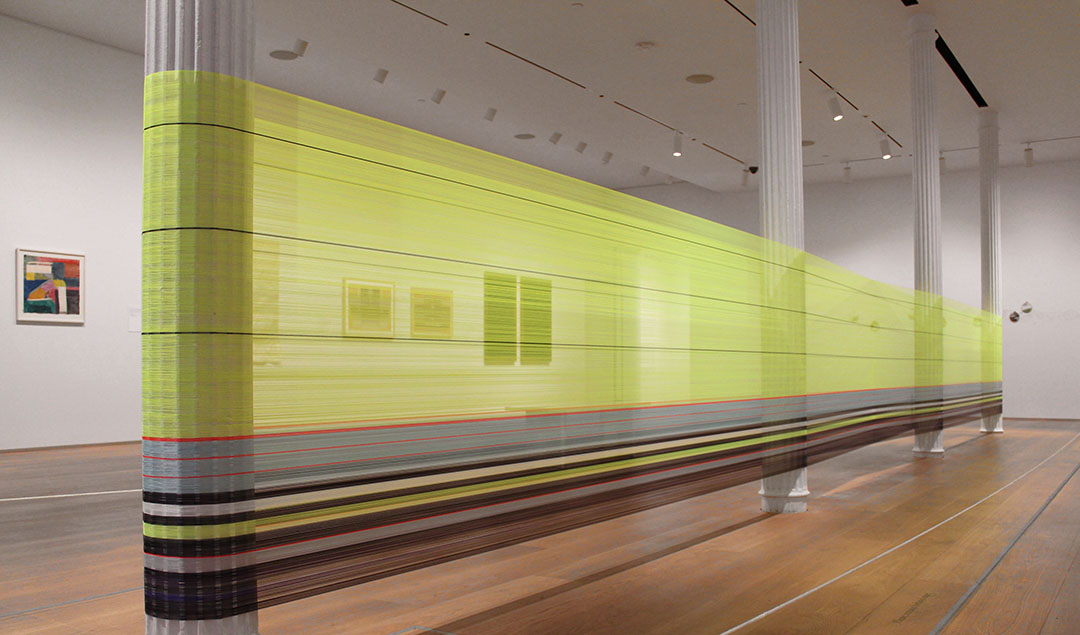
Anne Wilson, To Cross Walking New York, 2014, performance and sculpture. The Drawing Center (photo: Angeli Sion)

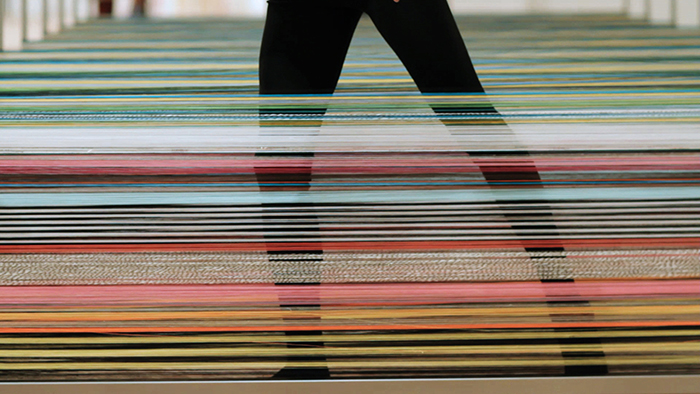
Anne Wilson, Walking the Warp Houston, 2010, performance and sculpture. Contemporary Arts Museum Houston

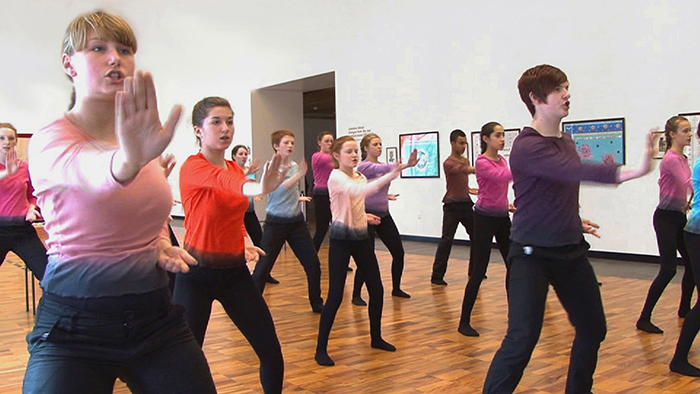
Anne Wilson, Walking the Warp Manchester, 2012, performance. Whitworth Art Gallery, Manchester, UK

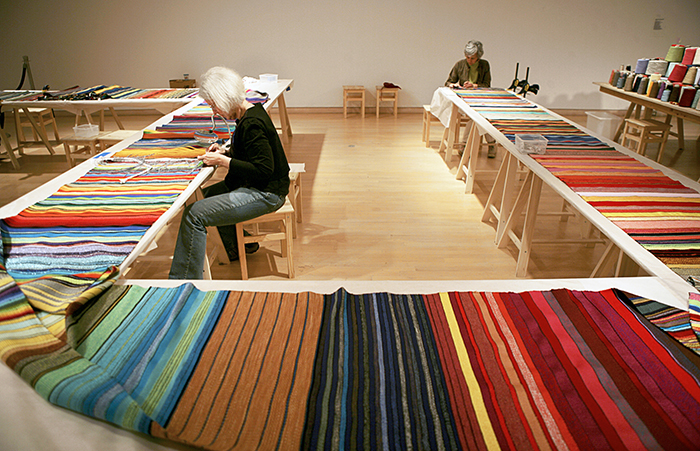
Anne Wilson, Local Industry, 2010, performance and production. Knoxville Museum of Art

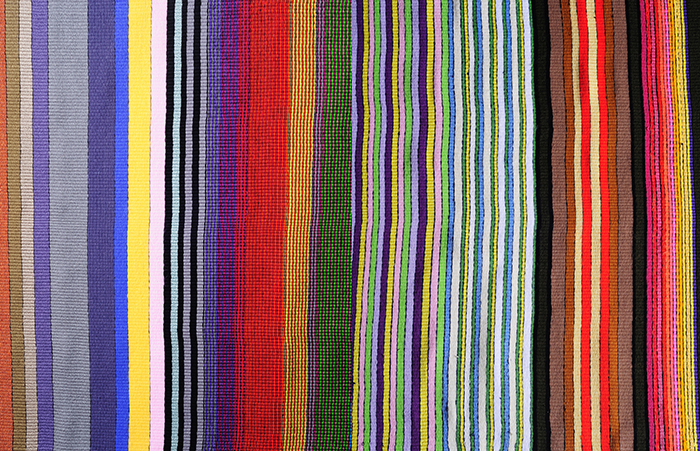
Anne Wilson, Local Industry Cloth, 2010, performance and production.

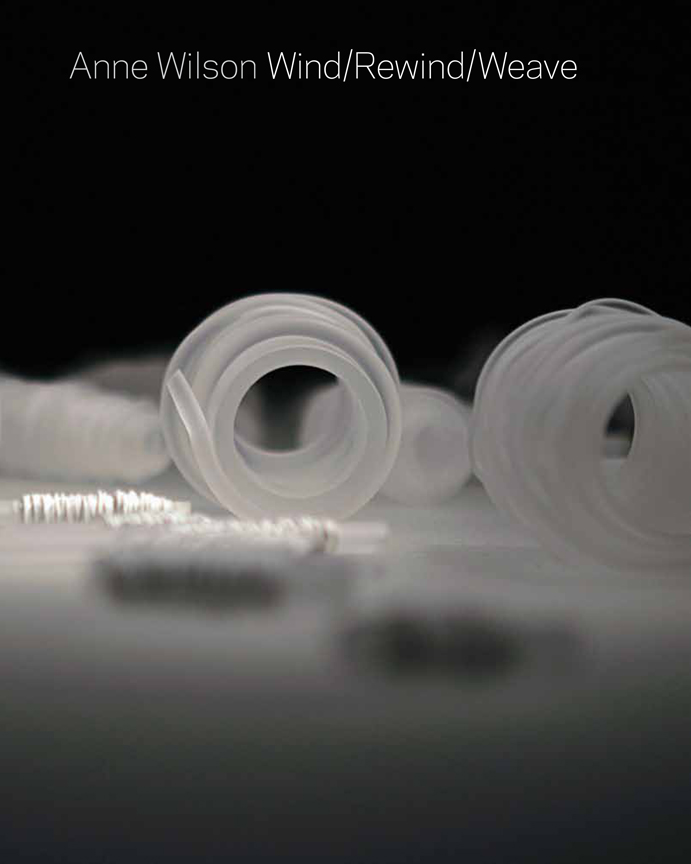
Anne Wilson: Wind/Rewind/Weave (exhibition catalog)

=== 2016 ===
- Anne Wilson: Drawings and Objects, James Harris Gallery, Seattle, WA (solo)
- A Global View: Recent Acquisitions of Textiles, 2012-2016, The Art Institute of Chicago, IL

=== 2015 ===
- Pathmakers, Women in Art, Craft and Design, Midcentury and Today, Museum of Arts and Design, New York, New York and traveled to the National Museum of Women in the Arts, Washington, D.C.
- Surrealism: The Conjured Life, Museum of Contemporary Art, Chicago, IL
- Art_Textiles, Whitworth Art Gallery, Manchester, England
- Material Fix, John Michael Kohler Arts Center, Sheboygan, WI
- Extending the Line, InterDisicplinary Experimental Arts, Colorado College, Colorado Springs, CO

=== 2014 ===
- Thread Lines, Drawing Center, New York, NY / performance commission To Cross (Walking New York)
- Fiber: Sculpture 1960-Present, originating at the Institute of Contemporary Art/Boston and traveling to the Wexner Center for the Arts and the Des Moines Art Center
- Material Gestures: Cut, Weave, Sew, Knot, Rhona Hoffman Gallery, Chicago, IL

=== 2013 ===
- Anne Wilson: Dispersions, Rhona Hoffman Gallery, Chicago, IL (solo)
- Hangzhou Fiber Triennial, Zhejiang Art Museum, Hangzhou City, China
- The Armory Show 2013, ( Rhona Hoffman Gallery), New York, NY
- Borderline, 21st Century Museum of Contemporary Art, Kanazawa, Japan
- F'd Up!, Art Gallery of Mississauga, Ontario, Canada
- Division of Labor: Anne Wilson, John Paul Morabito, Fernando Orellana, Richmond Center for Visual Arts, Western Michigan University, Kalamazoo, MI

=== 2012 ===
- Cotton: Global Threads, Whitworth Art Gallery, Manchester, England

Artists: Yinka Shonibare MBE, Lubaina Himid, Anne Wilson, Abdoulaye Konaté, Aboubakar Fofana, Grace Ndiritu, Liz Rideal

- Dublin Biennial 2012, Dublin, Ireland
- The 3rd Wave, The Lowry Centre for Advanced Training in Dance, Salford Quays, England
- Anne Wilson, Union League Club of Chicago, IL (solo)
- Dallas Biennial 12, volume 2, Curated by Stephen Lapthisophon

=== 2011 ===
- Anne Wilson: Rewinds, Rhona Hoffman Gallery, Chicago, IL (solo)
- Anne Wilson: Local Industry, Knoxville Museum of Art, Knoxville, TN (solo)
- 7th Triennale Internationale des Arts Textiles Contemporains de Tournai, Tournai, Belgium
- A New Hook, Museum of Design Zürich, Zürich, Switzerland
- Silent Echoes, 21st Century Museum of Contemporary Art, Kanazawa, Japan

=== 2010 ===
- Anne Wilson: Wind/Rewind/Weave, Knoxville Museum of Art, Knoxville TN (solo)
- Hand+Made: The Performative Impulse in Art and Craft, Contemporary Arts Museum, Houston, TX

=== 2009 ===
- Shift - Field of Fluctuation, 21st Century Museum of Contemporary Art, Kanazawa, Japan
- Dritto Rovescio, Triennale Design Museum, Milan, Italy
- Selected Works from the MCA Collection, Museum of Contemporary Art, Chicago
- All Over the Map, Kohler Arts Center, Sheboygan, WI

=== 2008 ===
- Portable City, Notations, Wind-Up, Rhona Hoffman Gallery, Chicago (solo)
- Anne Wilson: Errant Behaviors, Bowdoin College Museum of Art, Brunswick, ME (solo)
- Mess, Denler Art Gallery, St. Paul, MN (Wilson/Decker collaboration)
- Gestures of Resistance, Gray Matters, Dallas

=== 2007 ===
- Out of the Ordinary, Victoria & Albert Museum, London, England
- Radical Lace and Subversive Knitting, Museum of Arts & Design, New York
- The Worst is / Not to Die in Summer, Nassauischer Kunstverein Wiesbaden, Germany
- Connections: Experimental Design, Ivan Dougherty Gallery, University of New South Wales, Sydney, Australia
- Hot House, Cranbrook Art Museum, Bloomfield Hills, MI

=== 2006 ===
- Takeover, Hyde Park Art Center, Chicago (Anne Wilson/Shawn Decker collaboration)

=== 2005 ===
- Alternative Paradise, 21st Century Museum of Contemporary Art, Kanazawa, Japan (commission)
- Anne Wilson: Errant Behaviors, Indiana University School of Fine Arts Gallery, Bloomington, IL (solo)

=== 2004 ===
- Perspectives 140: Anne Wilson, Contemporary Arts Museum, Houston (solo)
- Anne Wilson, Drawings and Stills, Roy Boyd Gallery, Chicago (solo)

=== 2003 ===
- Anne Wilson: Unfoldings, University Art Gallery, San Diego State University, San Diego (solo)
- Anne Wilson, Colonies and Links, Revolution Gallery, Detroit (solo)

=== 2002 ===
- Whitney Biennial 2002, Whitney Museum of American Art, New York
- Anne Wilson: Unfoldings, Bakalar Gallery, MassArt, Boston (solo)

== Collections ==
Wilson's work is included in the collections of: 21st Century Museum of Contemporary Art, Kanazawa, Japan; Victoria & Albert Museum, London; Whitworth Art Gallery, Manchester, England; The Metropolitan Museum of Art, New York; Museum of Contemporary Art, Chicago; The Art Institute of Chicago; The M. H. de Young Memorial Museum, San Francisco; The Knoxville Museum of Art; The Detroit Institute of Arts; Cranbrook Art Museum, Bloomfield Hills, Michigan; Racine Art Museum, Racine, Wisconsin; Corning Museum of Glass, Corning, New York; Museum of Glass, International Center for Contemporary Art, Tacoma, Washington; Maxine and Stuart Frankel Foundation of Art, Bloomfield Hills, Michigan; Progressive Art Collection, Cleveland; The Illinois Collection of the State of Illinois Center, Chicago; Union League Club of Chicago; and LongHouse Reserve, East Hampton, New York.

== Awards ==
In 2015, Wilson was named a United States Artists Distinguished Fellow. In 2012, she received the NASAD Citation in recognition of a distinguished career in the visual arts, as well as a Distinguished Alumni Award from the Cranbrook Academy of Art and a Distinguished Artist Program award from the Union League Club of Chicago. Wilson has also received the following awards: Individual Artist Award from the Richard H. Driehaus Foundation, 2008; Artadia, The Fund for Art and Dialogue, Individual Artist Grant, 2001; Louis Comfort Tiffany Foundation Award, 1989; and the National Endowment for the Arts, Visual Arts Fellowships, 1988 and 1982.

== Sources ==
- Adamson, Glenn and Bryan-Wilson, Julia. Art in the Making: Artists and their Materials from the Studio to Crowdsourcing. London: Thames & Hudson, 2016, back cover photo and pp. 218–220.
- Guzman, Alissa. HYPERALLERGIC, September 28, 2015, "The Great Divide: A Survey of Women in Art and Craft" (Museum of Arts and Design, NY)
- Harris, Jennifer (editor/curator), Art_Textiles, (exhibit catalog, essay by Pennina Barnett, "Cloth, Memory and Loss"), The Whitworth, The University of Manchester, UK, 2015, pp. 10, 24-31, 84-85
- Ferris, Alison and Patterson, Karen. Toward Textiles. (exhibit catalog) Sheboygan, WI: John Michael Kohler Arts Center, 2015, cover image and p. 5.
- Vinebaum, Lisa. "Performing Globalization in the Textile Industry: Anne Wilson and Mandy Cano Villalobos," The Handbook of Textile Culture (anthology). Janis Jefferies, Diana Wood Conroy, and Hazel Clark, eds., London: Bloomsbury Academic, 2015, Chapter 11, pp, 169-185.
- Taft, Maggie. ARTFORUM, January 2014, Vol. 52, No. 5., "Anne Wilson" at Rhona Hoffman Gallery, Chicago, (review), p. 217
- Ollman, Leah. Art in America, December 2014,"Thread Lines" Drawing Center, (review), p. 149.
- Martinez, Alanna. New York Observer, September 19, 2014, "Anne Wilson is using the Drawing Center as a Weaving Loom," (review)
- Kleinberg Romanow, Joanna. Thread Lines. (exhibit catalog) New York: The Drawing Center, 2014, pp. 19–20, 72-73, 77
- Porter, Jenelle. Fiber-Sculpture 1960–present. (exhibit catalog) Boston: Institute of Contemporary Art/Boston; DelMonico Books. Prestel, 2014, pp. 52–53, 242-243, 252
- Editors. NEWCITY, Sep 18, "Art 50 2014: Chicago's Artists' Artists."
- Moxley, Alyssa. NEWCITY, November 24, 2014,
- Stratton, Shannon. Surface Design Journal, Winter, 2012, "Anne Wilson: Labors Lost, Re-imagined", pp. 12–15
- Anne Wilson: Wind/Rewind/Weave (exhibition catalog). WhiteWalls, Knoxville Museum of Art; distributed by The University of Chicago Press, 2011; essays by Glenn Adamson, Jenni Sorkin, Julia Bryan-Wilson, Philis Alvic, Laura Y. Liu, and Chris Molinski, curator
- Picard, Caroline. Center Field | Threading Infrastructure: An Interview with Anne Wilson, 2011 (interview)
- Hixson, Kathryn. TEXTILE, Volume 9, Issue 2, 2011, "Exhibition Review, Anne Wilson: Wind/Rewind/Weave", UK: Berg Publishers, pp. 220–229
- Ise, Claudine. ARTFORUM, Jan 14-Feb 19, 2011. Anne Wilson at Rhona Hoffman Gallery (review)
- Koplos, Janet and Metcalf, Bruce (eds). Makers, Chapel Hill, NC: The University of North Carolina Press, pp. 427–428, 2011
- Cassel Oliver, Valerie. Hand+Made: The Performative Impulse in Art and Craft, (exhibition catalog), essays by curator Valerie Cassel Oliver, Glenn Adamson, Namita Gupta Wiggers, Houston, Texas: Contemporary Arts Museum Houston, 2010
- Waxman, Lori. ARTFORUM Jan 31, 2008, (review)
- Snodgrass, Susan. Art in America, October 2008, (review), pp. 196–197
- Ullrich, Polly. Sculpture May 2008, Vol. 27, No. 4, "Anne Wilson: New Labor" (essay), pp. 38 – 43
- Elms, Anthony E. Art Papers, May/June 2008, "Anne Wilson" at Rhona Hoffman (review), pp. 55–56
- Klein, Paul. Art Letter, January 25, 2008, Anne Wilson at Rhona Hoffman, Chicago
- Newell, Laurie Britton. "Anne Wilson in conversation with Laurie Britton Newell"; Out of the Ordinary: Spectacular Craft. November 2006. Ed. Laurie Britton Newell. London: V&A Publications and the Crafts Council. pp. 112–123
- "Organic Landscapes: Morphologies and Topologies in the Art of Anne Wilson" by Michael Batty, London: Victoria & Albert Museum, pp. 112–123
- The New York Times, Jan 27, 2007 (photo) p. B9, The Arts
- Livingstone, Joan and John Ploof, eds. The Object of Labor: Art, Cloth, and Cultural Production. Chicago and Cambridge: School of the Art Institute of Chicago and MIT Press, 2007. pp. 386,387; artist project pp. 105–112
- Jenkins, Bruce. Anne Wilson, Errant Behaviors. (exhibition catalog), Bloomington: Indiana University SoFA Gallery. (essay "Errant Behaviors: Reanimating the Past," pp 3–7; CD audio remix by Shawn Decker), 2005
- Cassel Oliver, Valerie. "Anne Wilson: Fragmented Territories," Perspectives 140: Anne Wilson, (exhibition catalog), Houston, Texas: Contemporary Arts Museum Houston, 2004
- Rinder, Lawrence R. Whitney Biennial 2002, (exhibition catalog), New York: Whitney Museum of American Art, pp. 230–231
- Hixson, Kathryn. "The Topology of Anne Wilson's Topologies;" Tung, Lisa. "Anne Wilson: Present Corpus;" Yapelli, Tina. "Over Time," Anne Wilson: Unfoldings, (exhibition catalog), Boston: Mass Art, 2002
- Gordon, Hattie. "Feast" and Porges, Tim. "Postminimal and After." Foreword by Elizabeth A. T. Smith. Portfolio Collection: Anne Wilson, (monograph), Winchester, England: Telos Art Publishing, 2001
- Ferris, Alison. "Forbidden Touch: Anne Wilson's Cloth", Reinventing Textiles, Volume 2: Gender and Identity, Winchester, England: Telos Art Publishing, pp. 39–47, 2001
