= Knoxville Museum of Art =

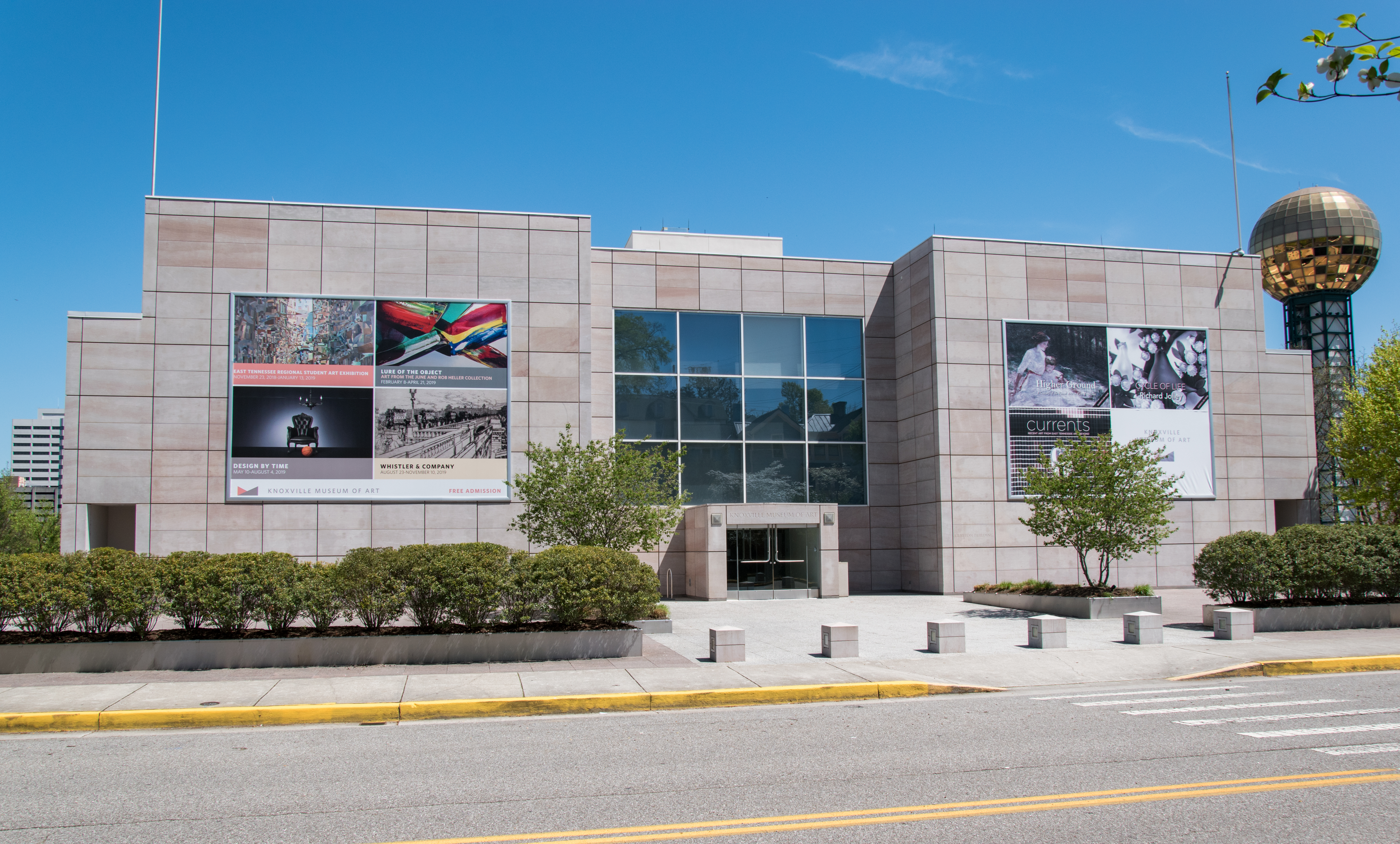
- Established: 1961
- Location: 1050 World’s Fair Park, Knoxville, Tennessee, United States
- Coordinates: 35°57′45″N 83°55′31″W
- Director: David L. Butler
- Website: www.knoxart.org

The Knoxville Museum of Art (KMA), is an art museum in Knoxville, Tennessee. It specializes in historical and contemporary art pieces from the East Tennessee region. According to its mission statement, the museum "celebrates the art and artists of East Tennessee, presents new art and new ideas, educates and serves a diverse community, enhances Knoxville’s quality of life, and operates ethically, responsibly, and transparently as a public trust."

== History ==
The museum opened in 1961 as the Dulin Gallery of Art, which was housed in the H.L. Dulin House on Kingston Pike. The Dulin House was designed in 1915 by prominent architect John Russell Pope in the Neoclassical Revival style. The house had limited space, however, and the lack of security and climate control prevented the museum's accreditation by the American Association of Museums. In 1984, the board of trustees voted to build a new facility at the site of 1982 World's Fair in downtown Knoxville. The name was changed to "Knoxville Museum of Art" in 1987. The new 53,200-square-foot (4,940 m^{2}) facility, designed by noted architect Edward Larrabee Barnes, opened on March 25, 1990.

== Building ==
The Edward Larrabee Barnes-designed modern building is named in honor of Jim Clayton, the largest single contributor to its construction. The exterior of the four-story steel and concrete building is sheathed in locally quarried pink Tennessee marble. The museum includes five galleries and two large outdoor garden areas. In 2013 and 2014, the museum underwent a comprehensive, top-to-bottom restoration and renovation at a cost of nearly $6 million. The building’s Tennessee marble cladding was cleaned and restored, and the entry plaza and third floor terrace were rebuilt and repaved with pink and gray Vermont granite. The North Garden was also redesigned and planted with native trees and shrubs.

== Collection ==
In its early years the museum focused mostly on ambitious traveling exhibitions. Its collection and programming has since evolved to focus increasingly on Southern Appalachian culture and artists from the East Tennessee region. Higher Ground: A Century of the Visual Arts in East Tennessee is a permanent exhibition that highlights the works of noted native artists such as Lloyd Branson, Catherine Wiley, Joseph Delaney, Beauford Delaney, and Bessie Harvey, as well as major artists from outside the region who produced significant work in the Knoxville area, such as Ansel Adams and Elliot Porter.

Another permanent exhibition, Currents: Recent Art from East Tennessee and Beyond, is part of the museum’s effort to introduce new art and new ideas. It features works from a wide range of artists, including Gordon Cheung, Ori Gersht, Red Grooms, Wade Guyton, Robert Longo, Loretta Lux, William Morris, Ulf Puder, Hiraki Sawa, Kenneth Snelson, Robert Stackhouse, and Anne Wilson. A new permanent exhibition of modern and contemporary studio glass highlights a collection area growing in strength, with important works by Harvey Littleton, Karen LaMonte, Andrew Erdos, and William Morris. In the Spring of 2014, the museum unveiled a permanent glass installation Richard Jolley, Cycle of Life: Within the Power of Dreams and the Wonder of Infinity. Made possible by a gift from Ann and Steve Bailey, it is the largest figural glass installation in the world.

The museum has a collection of nine Thorne miniature rooms. The rooms are notable miniatures, designed by Narcissa Niblack Thorne in the 1930s and 1940s. The largest collection of Thorne miniature rooms is located at the Art Institute of Chicago.

== Exhibitions ==
The museum supplements and complements its core permanent installations with a lively schedule of temporary exhibitions that explore aspects of regional culture and its relation to national and international artistic developments. The museum has featured solo exhibitions by contemporary artists such as Anne Wilson, Jun Kaneko, Candida Höfer, Maya Lin, Jim Campbell, Anton Vidokle, Johanna Billing, Eva Zeisel, Chuck Close, and Ai Weiwei.

The museum also has an ongoing interest in the creation of first solo museum shows for promising new artists, both from the region and from further afield. The KMA has organized solo exhibitions of work by artists such as Liz Collins, Tam Van Tran, Oliver Payne and Nick Relph, Clare Rojas, Sarah Hobbs, Michael Raedecker, Timothy Horn, Seonna Hong, and Tomory Dodge.

== General ==
The KMA has an educational focus. Programming includes: museum tours, workshops, artist residencies, outreach programs, lectures, concerts, classroom programs, and family activities. The KMA reaches over 60,000 people annually through museum visits, special events, concerts and other programs. Its approximately $1.7 million annual operating budget comes from individual and corporate donors, museum memberships, rental income, local, state, and federal government grants, endowments, and annual fundraising events. The KMA was accredited by the American Alliance of Museums in 1996 and reaccredited in 2005.

== Gallery ==
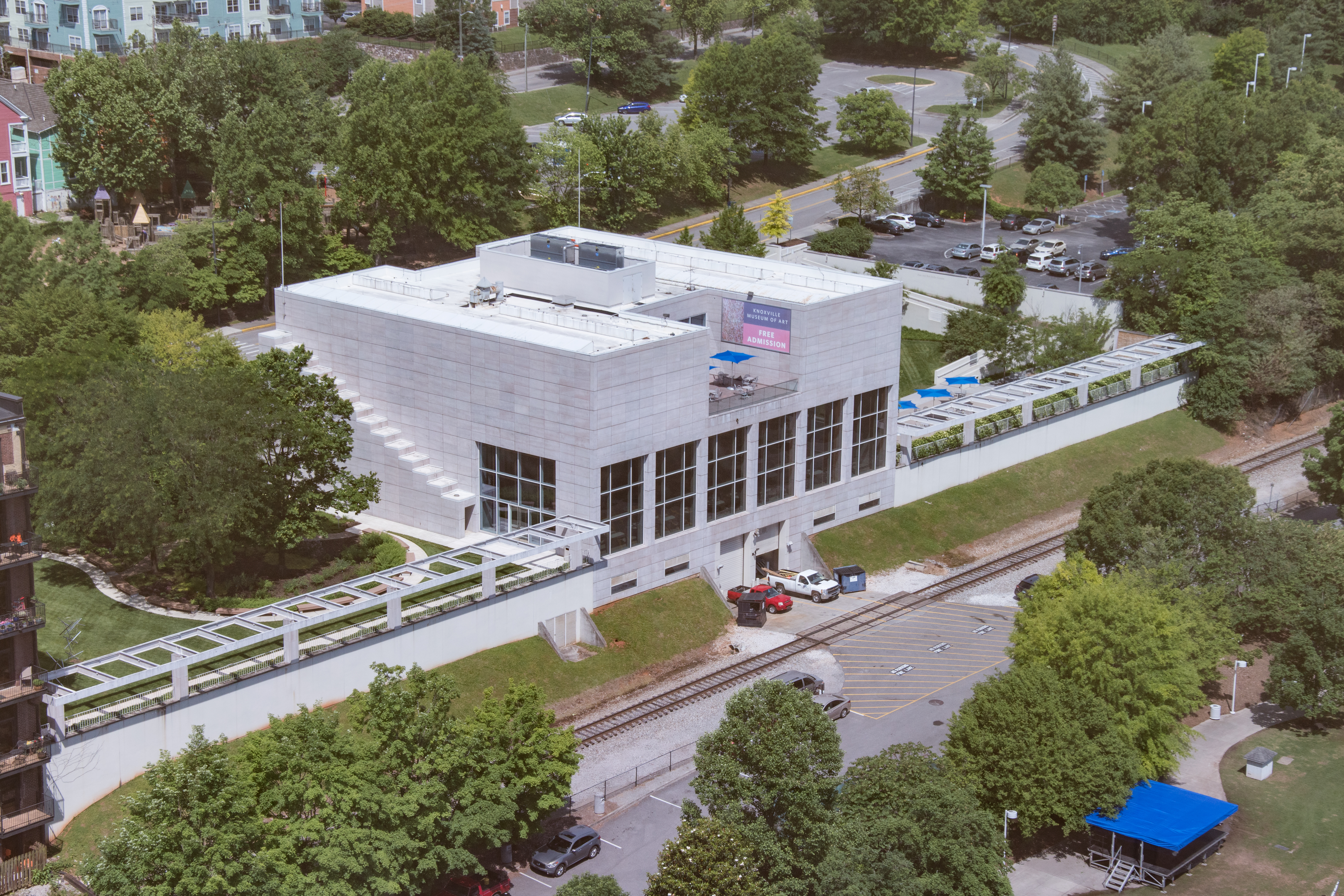
East facade and grounds

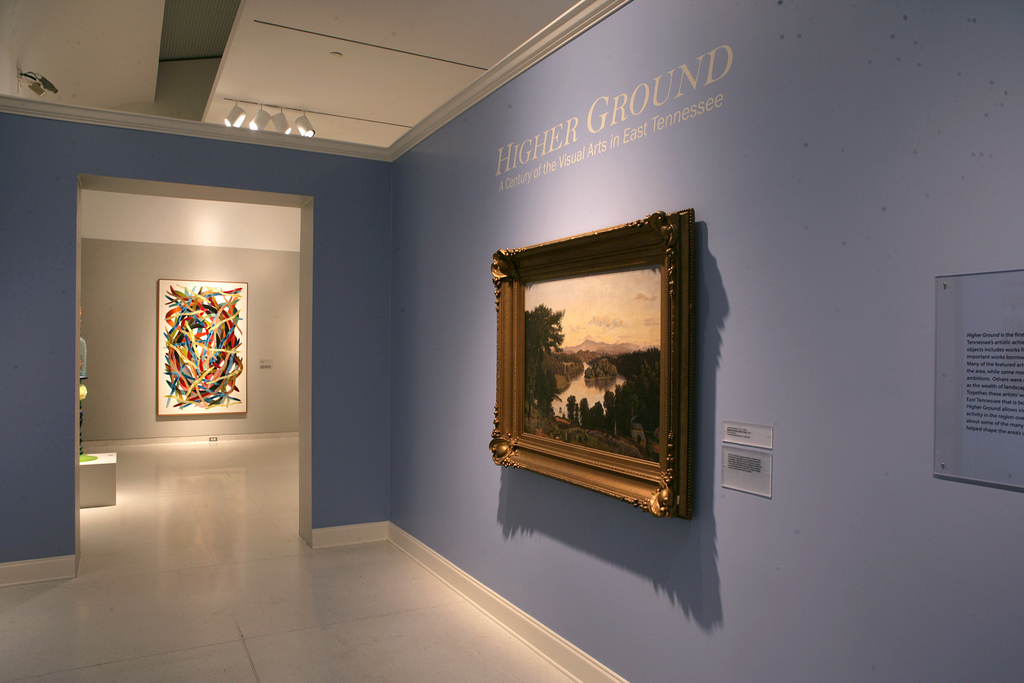
Gallery space

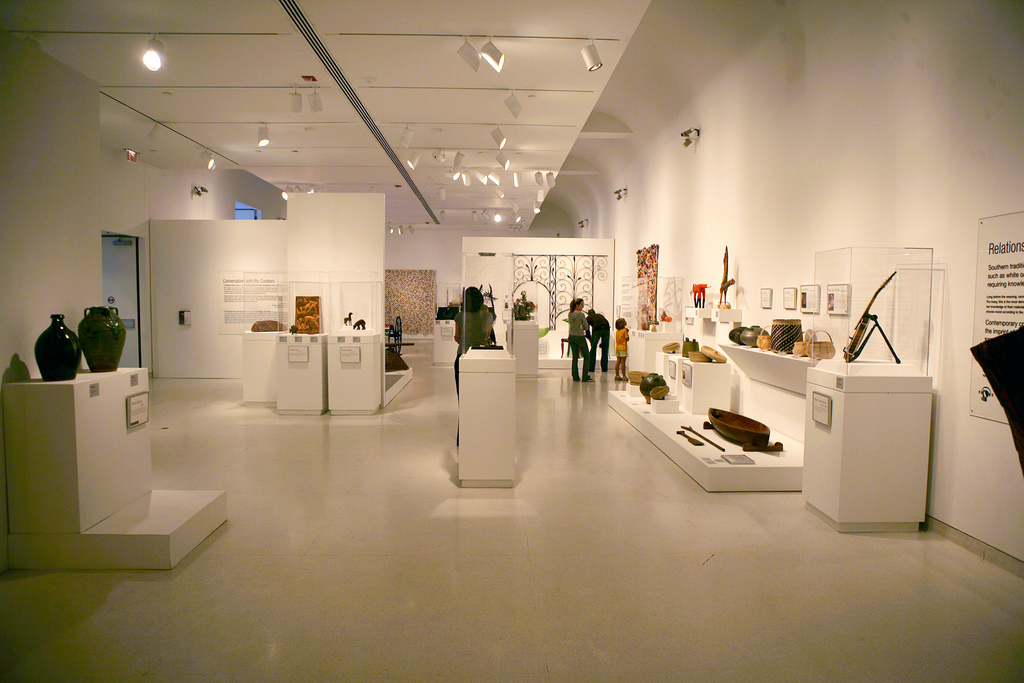
Gallery space
