= 21st Century Museum of Contemporary Art, Kanazawa =

Japanese museum

Coordinates: 36°33′39″N 136°39′29″E

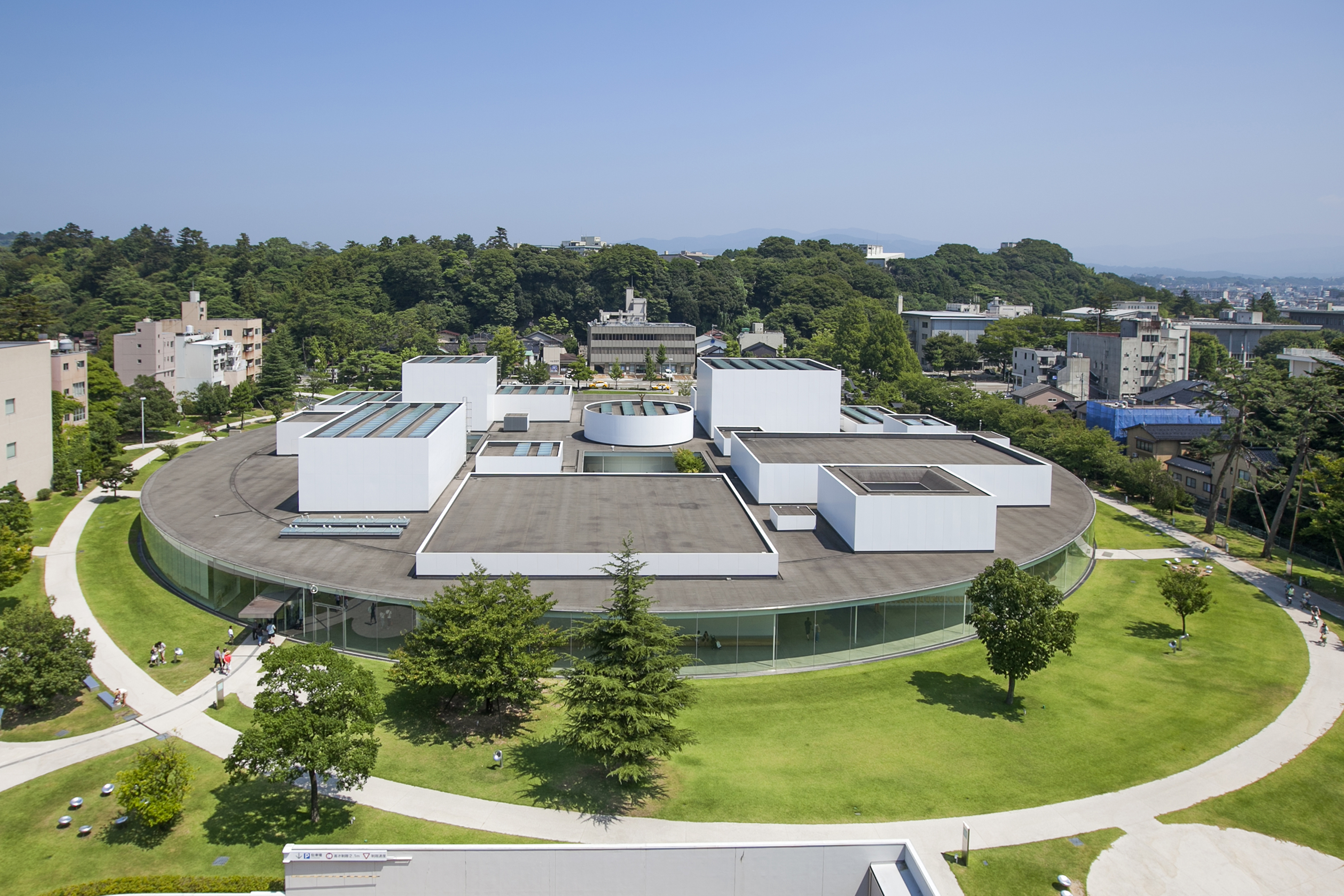
- Established: October 9, 2004
- Location: Kanazawa, Ishikawa, Japan
- Website: www.kanazawa21.jp/en/

The 21st Century Museum of Contemporary Art, Kanazawa (金沢21世紀美術館, Kanazawa Nijūisseiki Bijutsukan) is a museum of contemporary art located in Kanazawa, Ishikawa, Japan.

The museum was designed by Japanese architects Kazuyo Sejima and Ryue Nishizawa of the architectural office SANAA in 2004. In October 2005, one year after its opening, the Museum marked 1,570,000 visitors. In 2020, due to the COVID-19 pandemic it attracted only 971,256 visitors, a drop of 63 percent from 2019, but it still ranked tenth on the list of most-visited art museums in the world.

Since its founding, the museum's director has been Yuko Hasegawa.

== The building ==
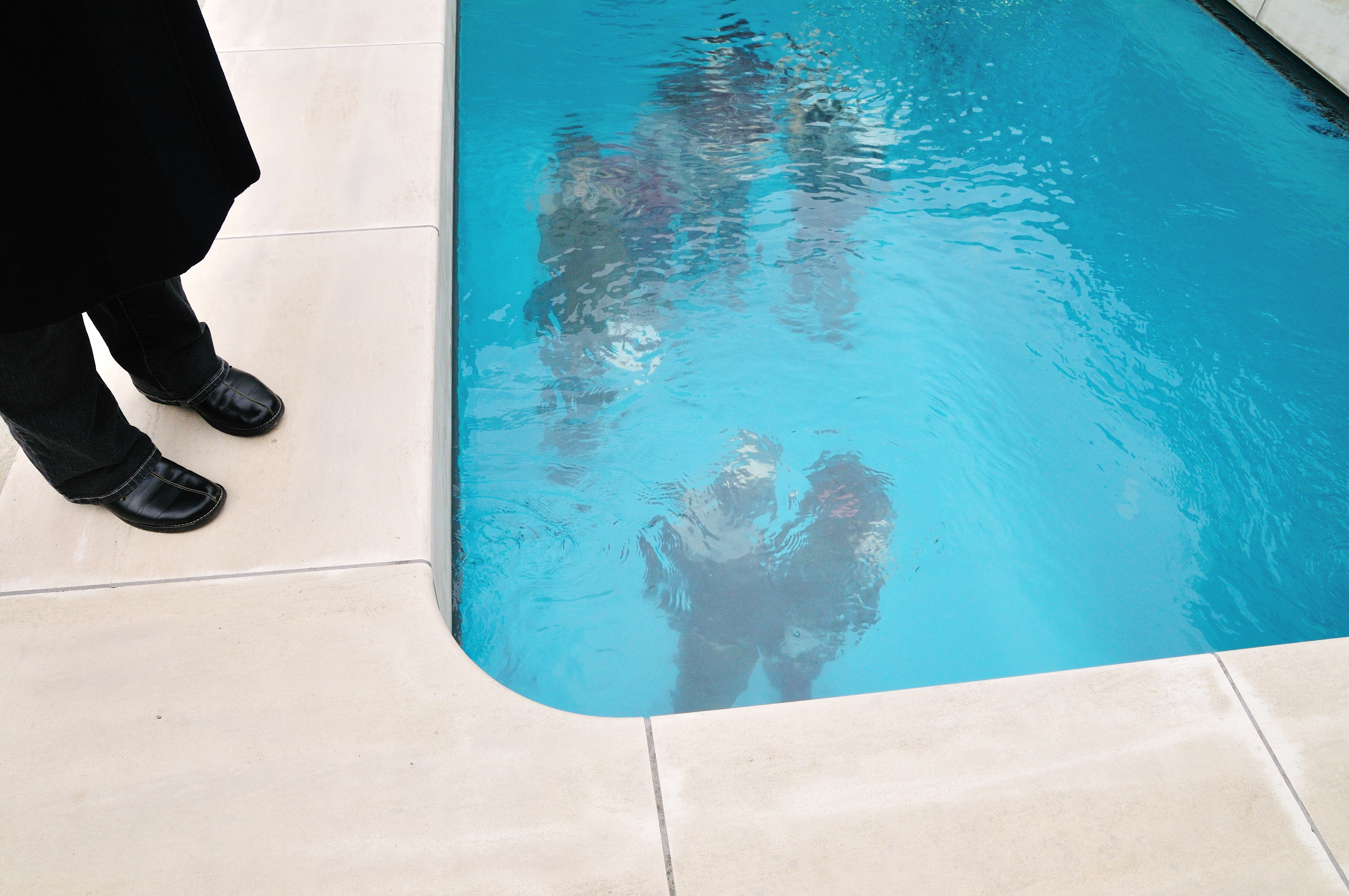
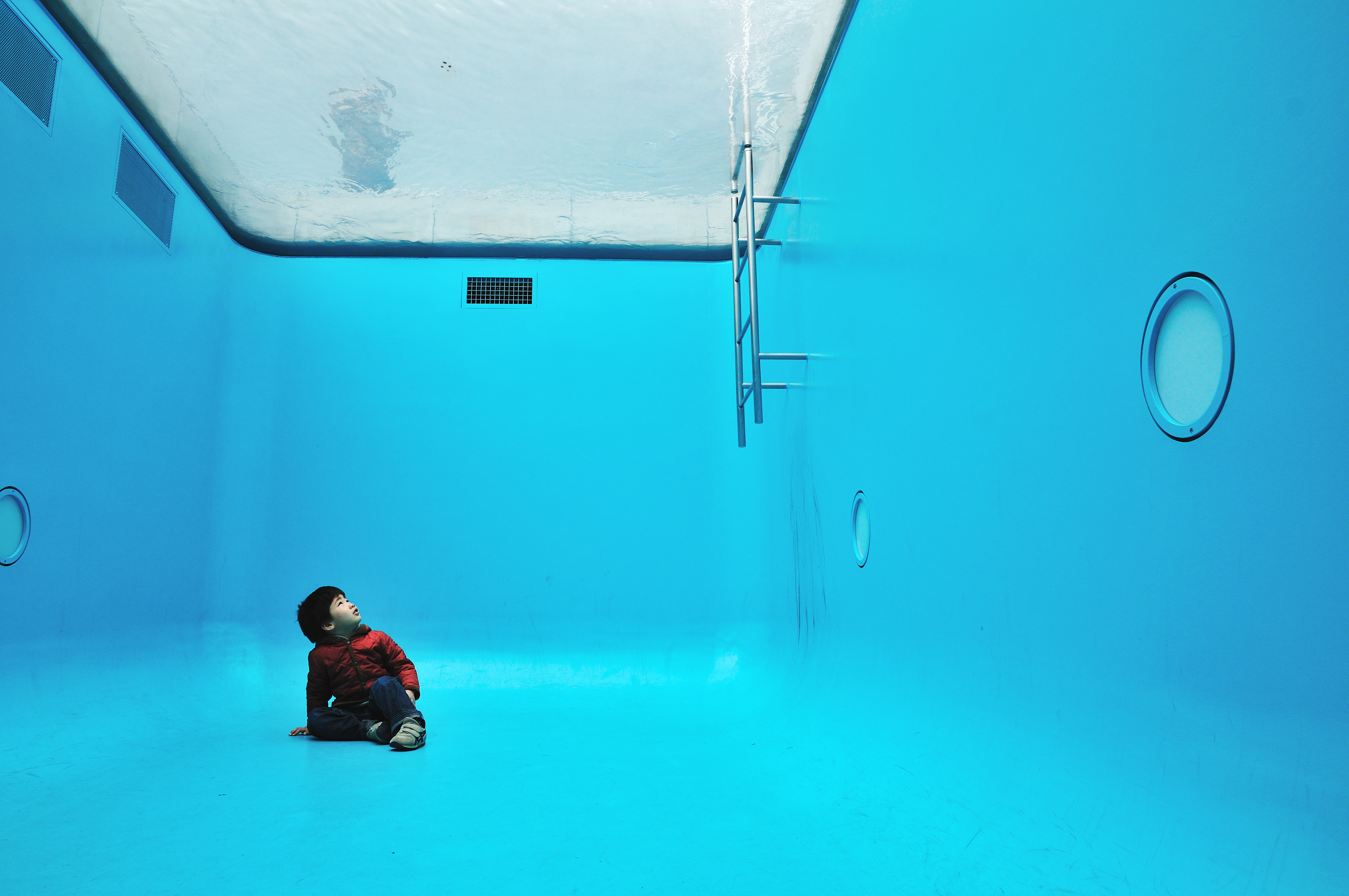
Leandro Erlich's "The Swimming Pool" from above and below

The Museum is located in the center of Kanazawa, near Kenroku-en garden and the Ishikawa Prefectural Museum of Art. The building has a circular form, with a diameter of 112.5 metres. This shape aims to keep the appearance of the overall building volume low, to mitigate the scale of the project and allows access from multiple points of entry. The transparency of the building further manifests the wish to avoid the museum being perceived as a large, introverted mass.

The building includes community gathering spaces, such as a library, lecture hall, and children's workshop, located on the periphery, and museum spaces in the middle. The exhibition areas comprise numerous galleries with multiple options for division, expansion, or concentration. The galleries are of various proportions and light conditions – from bright daylight through glass ceilings to spaces with no natural light source, their height ranging from 4 to 12 metres. The circulation spaces are designed to make them usable as additional exhibition areas. Four fully glazed internal courtyards, each unique in character, provide daylight to the center of the building and a fluent border between community spaces and museum spaces.

In earlier designs, the architects had hoped to puncture the independent galleries with many windows, through which visitors would feel connected with other rooms; the curators, who wanted the separate galleries to be more autonomous, vetoed that suggestion. Sejima also tried to warp the strict geometry of the circular glass wall into a subtle oval.

For the museum's logo, administrators chose the horizontal floor plan itself, which appears on signage and T-shirts. In coordination with the architects, the fashion designer Naoki Takizawa created uniforms for the museum staff.

== Collection ==
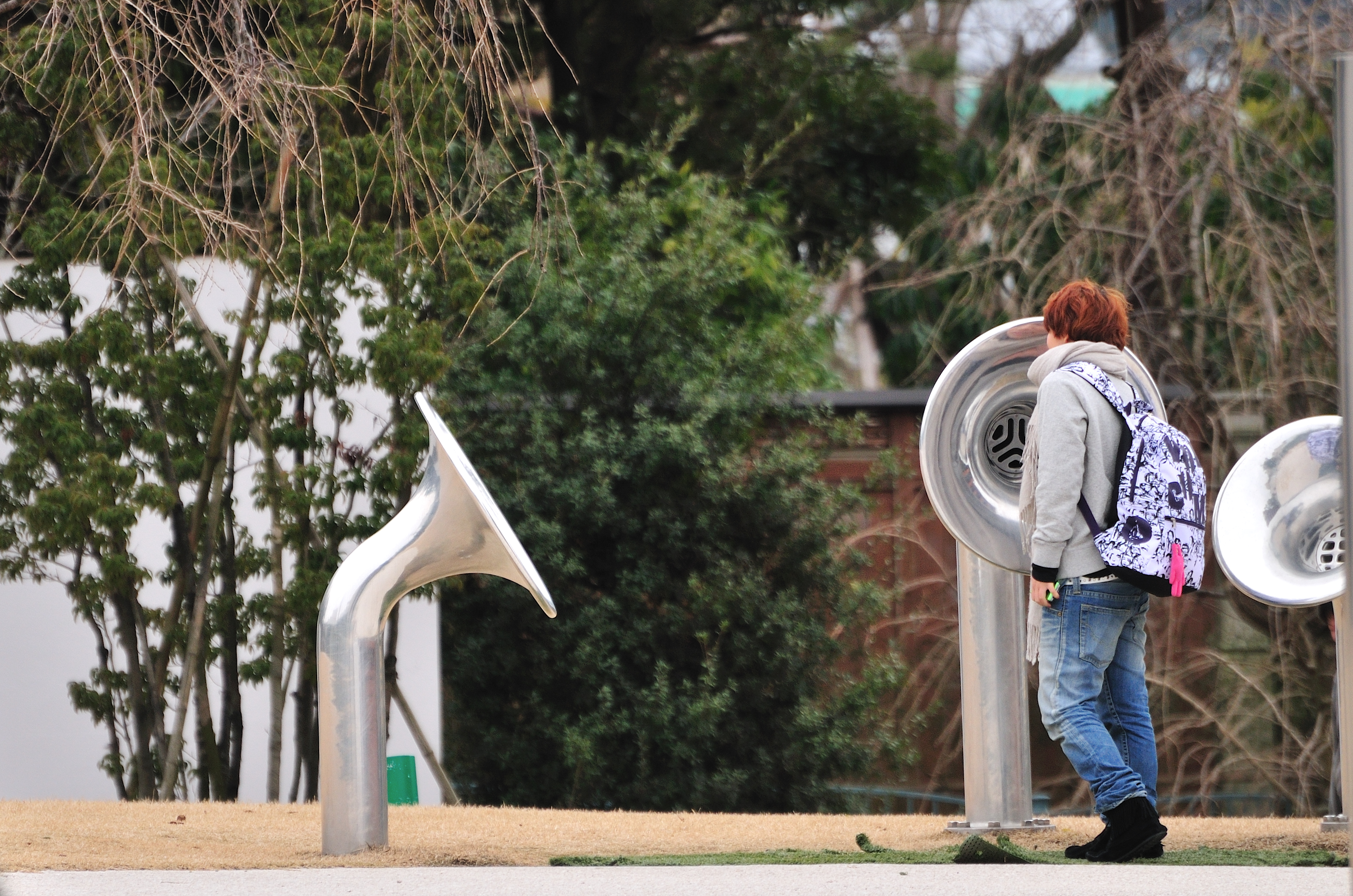
Installations, 21st Century Museum of Contemporary Art.

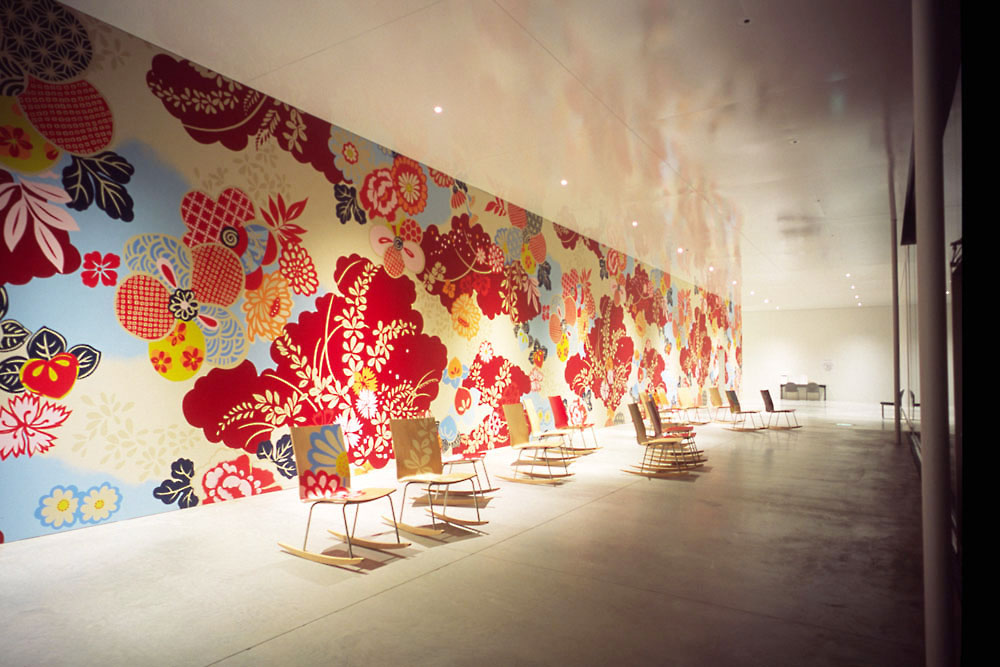
Art inside the Museum.

The collection of the 21st Century Museum of Contemporary Art, Kanazawa is focused on works produced since 1980 that "propose new values".

Artists in the collection are encouraged to produce site-specific installations that become "closely associated with the Kanazawa area".

Artists in the permanent collection include; Francis Alys, Matthew Barney, Tony Cragg, Olafur Eliasson, Leandro Erlich, Isa Genzken, Kojima Hisaya, Gordon Matta Clark, Peter Newman, Carsten Nicolai, Giuseppe Penone, Gerhard Richter, Murayama Ruriko, Hiraki Sawa, Atsuko Tanaka, James Turrell, Patrick Tuttofuoco, Anne Wilson and Suda Yoshihiro.

Among the large scale works on permanent display are Leandro Erlich's Swimming Pool (2004) and Color Activity House (2010) by Olafur Eliasson.
