= Leandro Erlich =

Argentine artist

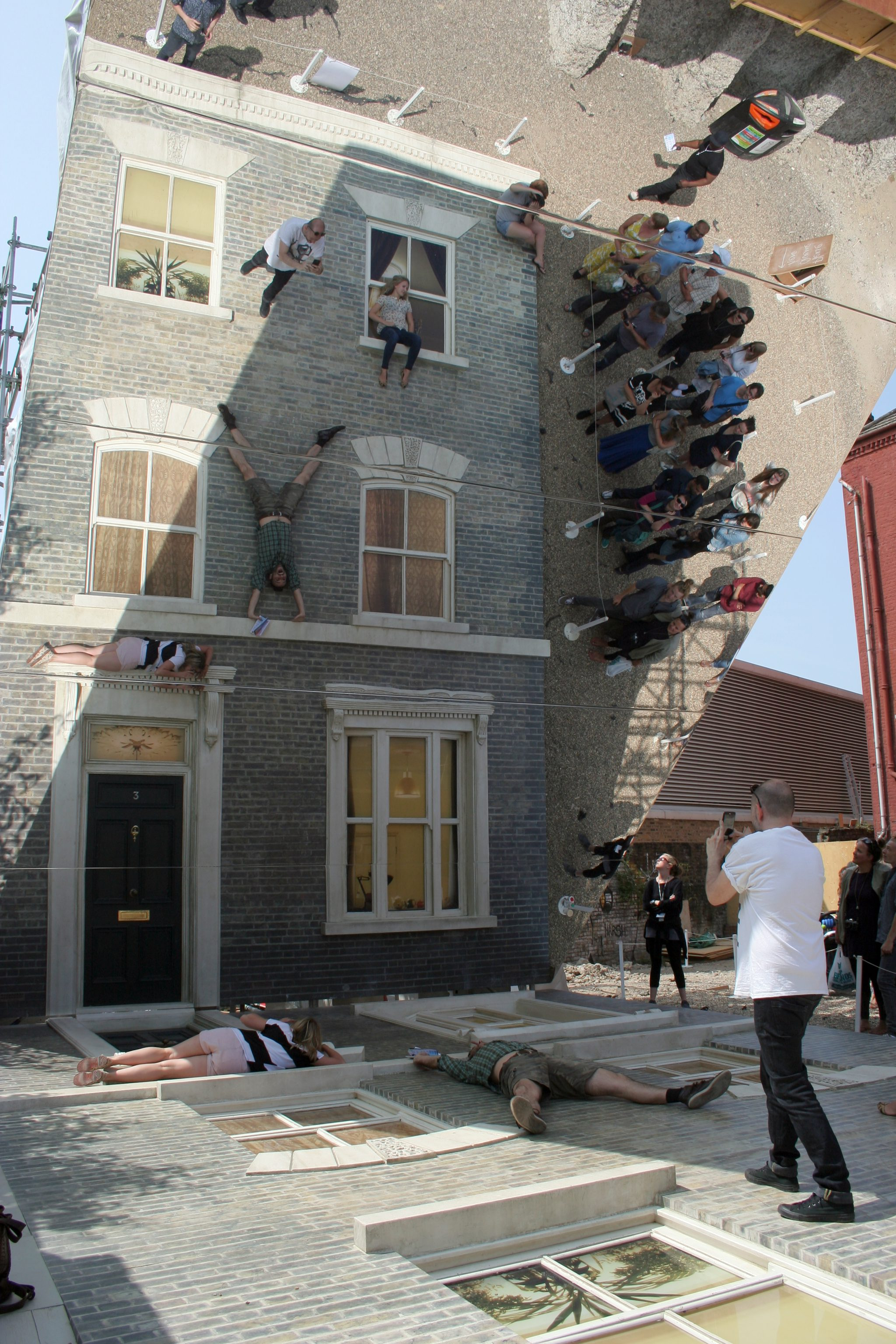
Dalston House installation by Leandro Erlich in July 2013

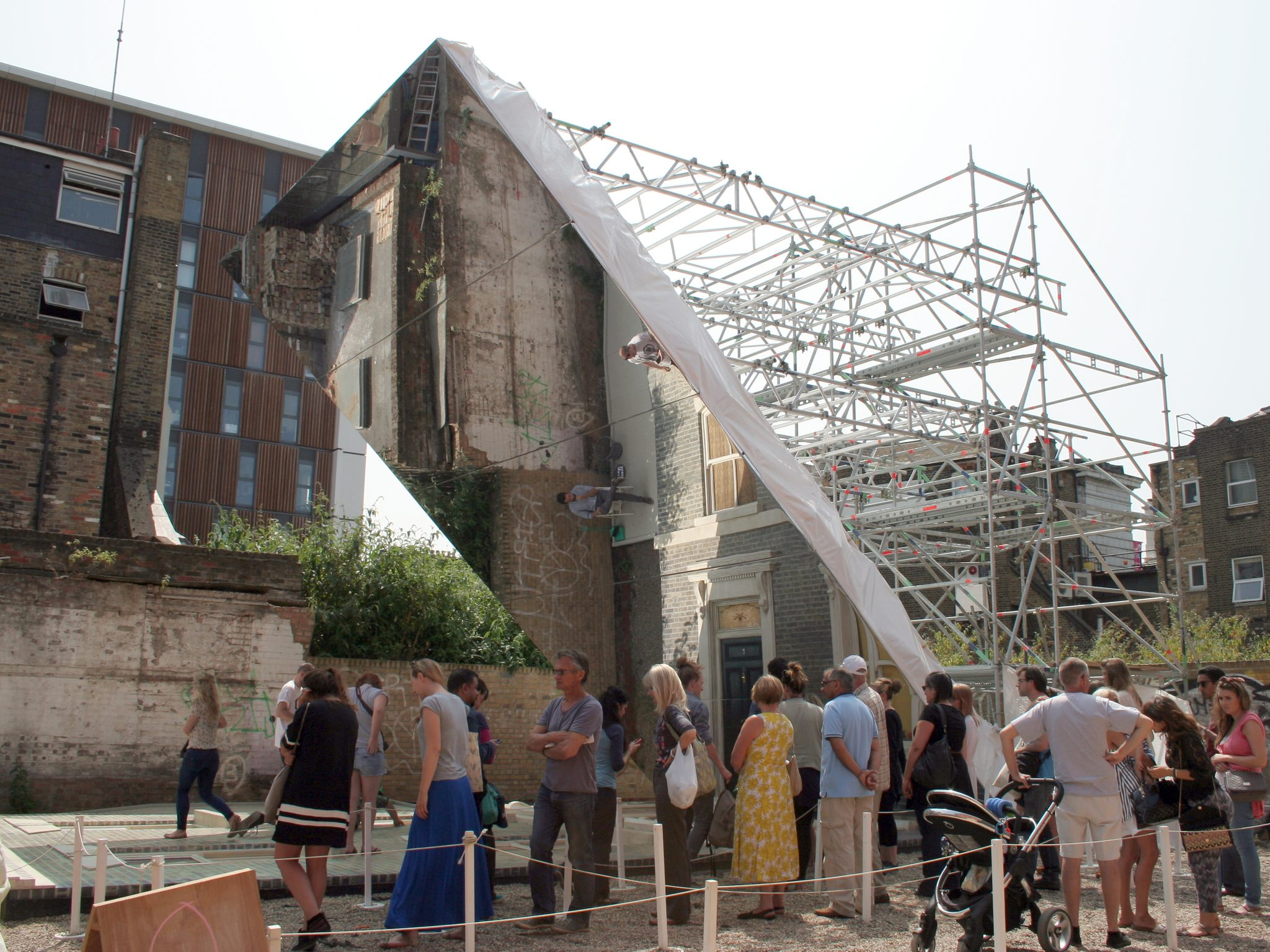
Dalston House from another angle

Leandro Erlich (born 1973 in Buenos Aires, Argentina) is an internationally exhibited Argentine conceptual artist.

== Career ==
In 2001 he represented his nation at the Venice Biennial and was included in the main section of the biennial once again in 2005.

The artist's work was also included in the 2000 Whitney Biennial and the 2001 Istanbul Biennial.

In 2008 Erlich created the Swimming Pool installation which was on display at MoMA PS1 in the Long Island City section of Queens, New York City, and presented Ladder and Window, a commissioned piece for Prospect New Orleans No 1.

In summer 2013, Erlich exhibited Dalston House, an optical illusion at the Dalston Mill site in Dalston, East London with a huge mirror suspended at 45° (from the horizontal) over a life-size model of the façade of a Victorian terraced townhouse placed horizontally on the ground, giving the appearance of visitors climbing or hanging off the side of the building.

One of Erlich's most popular works is his immersive architectural environment called Swimming Pool, which has been exhibited at MoMA PS1 in Queens, New York City, New York and is now on permanent display as part of the collection at the 21st Century Museum of Contemporary Art in Kanazawa, Japan . The Museum of Fine Arts, Houston presented Leandro Erlich: Seeing is Not Believing in 2022, a solo show with two immersive artworks by the artist.

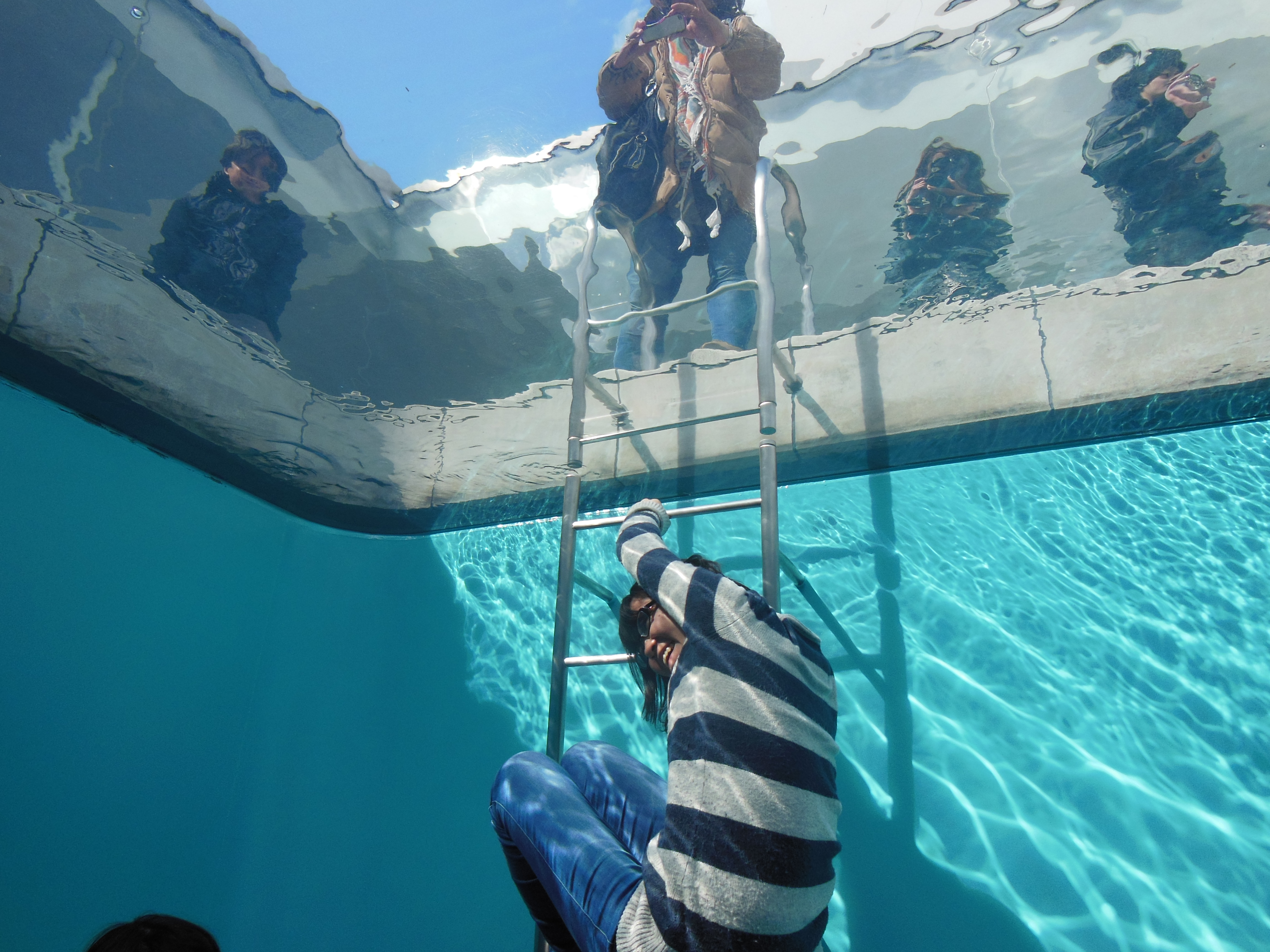
Swimming Pool, 21st Century Museum of Contemporary Art in Kanazawa, Japan

The Pérez Art Museum Miami organized the first mid-career survey of Erlich's work in the United States in 2022. Curated by Dan Cameron and titled Leandro Erlich: Liminal, the show included popular ,—and critically acclaimed pieces such as Swimming Pool.

== Awards ==
He won his first Konex Award in 2002. In 2012 he won the Platinum Konex Award as the most important installation artist from the last decade in Argentina. The artist also won the 43rd GNMH AWARD.
