= Tam Van Tran =

Vietnam-born American visual artist (born 1966)

Tam Van Tran (born 1966) is a visual artist born in Vietnam who lives and works in Los Angeles, California. His primary materials for paintings and sculptures include clay and paper, and extend to chlorophyll, glass, algae, staples, crushed eggshells, Wite-out eraser liquid, beet juice, gelatin, and other diverse ingredients which lend texture and intricacy to his organically-molded abstractions.

Exhibitions featuring the work of Tam Van Tran have taken place at the Museum of Contemporary Art, Santa Barbara, the Museum of Contemporary Art Denver, the Whitney Museum of American Art, the UCLA Hammer Museum, the University of Houston Blaffer Art Museum, the Knoxville Museum of Art, the Weatherspoon Art Museum, North Carolina, the Margulies Collection at the Warehouse, Miami, and is in numerous public collections including: The Museum of Modern Art, the Walker Art Center Minneapolis, The Broad Collection, the Whitney Museum of American Art, the Hirshhorn Museum and Sculpture Garden, Washington DC, the Cleveland Museum of Art, the Museum of Contemporary Art, Los Angeles, the Craft and Folk Art Museum, Los Angeles, the Contemporary Museum, Honolulu, the Museum of Fine Arts Houston Blaffer Museum, the Institute of Contemporary Art, Boston, the San Jose Museum of Art, the Albright-Knox Art Gallery, Buffalo, and the Neuberger Museum of Art. He is a graduate of the Pratt Institute and the Film and Television Program at UCLA.
