= Thorne miniature rooms =

Collection of miniature room models

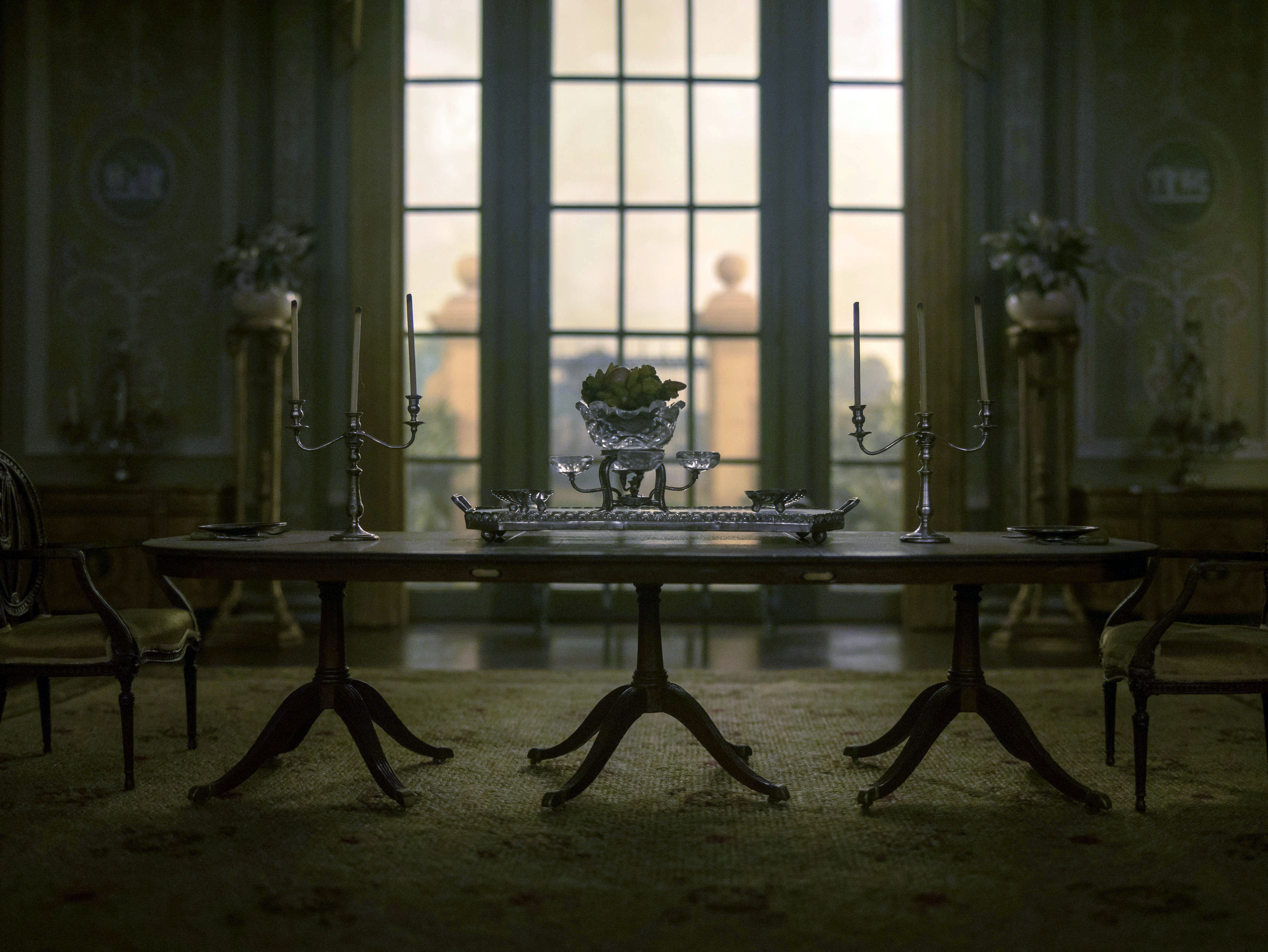
Table in the 1760 New Hampshire dining room, Thorne miniature rooms at the Art Institute of Chicago

The Thorne miniature rooms are a set of approximately 100 miniature models of rooms created between 1932 and 1940 under the direction of Narcissa Niblack Thorne. Ninety-nine of the rooms are believed still to be in existence; the majority (68) are on display at the Art Institute of Chicago, while 20 are at the Phoenix Art Museum, nine at the Knoxville Museum of Art, and one each at The Children's Museum of Indianapolis and the Kaye Miniature Museum in Los Angeles. The Art Institute's rooms document European and American interiors from the late 13th century to the 1930s and the 17th century to the 1930s, respectively. Constructed on a 1:12 scale, the rooms are largely made of the same materials as full-sized rooms, and some even include original works of art.

== Background ==
The model rooms were the brainchild of Narcissa Niblack Thorne, who was born in 1882 in Vincennes, Indiana. During her childhood, her uncle Albert Parker Niblack, a United States Navy vice admiral, sent her many antique dollhouse miniatures from around the world. The idea for the model rooms also developed from Thorne's collection of miniature furniture and household accessories, which she began assembling around 1900, and her desire to house and display these items. A further inspiration may have been a miniature shadow box that she encountered at a bazaar in Istanbul during the 1920s.

When she was 19, Thorne married Montgomery Ward department store heir James Ward Thorne, whose fortune would help finance her hobby. They lived together in Lake Forest, Illinois. By 1930, Thorne was researching period architecture, interior design, and decorative arts to create sketches and blueprints for miniature rooms to house her dollhouse miniatures and other miniature furniture.

== Description ==
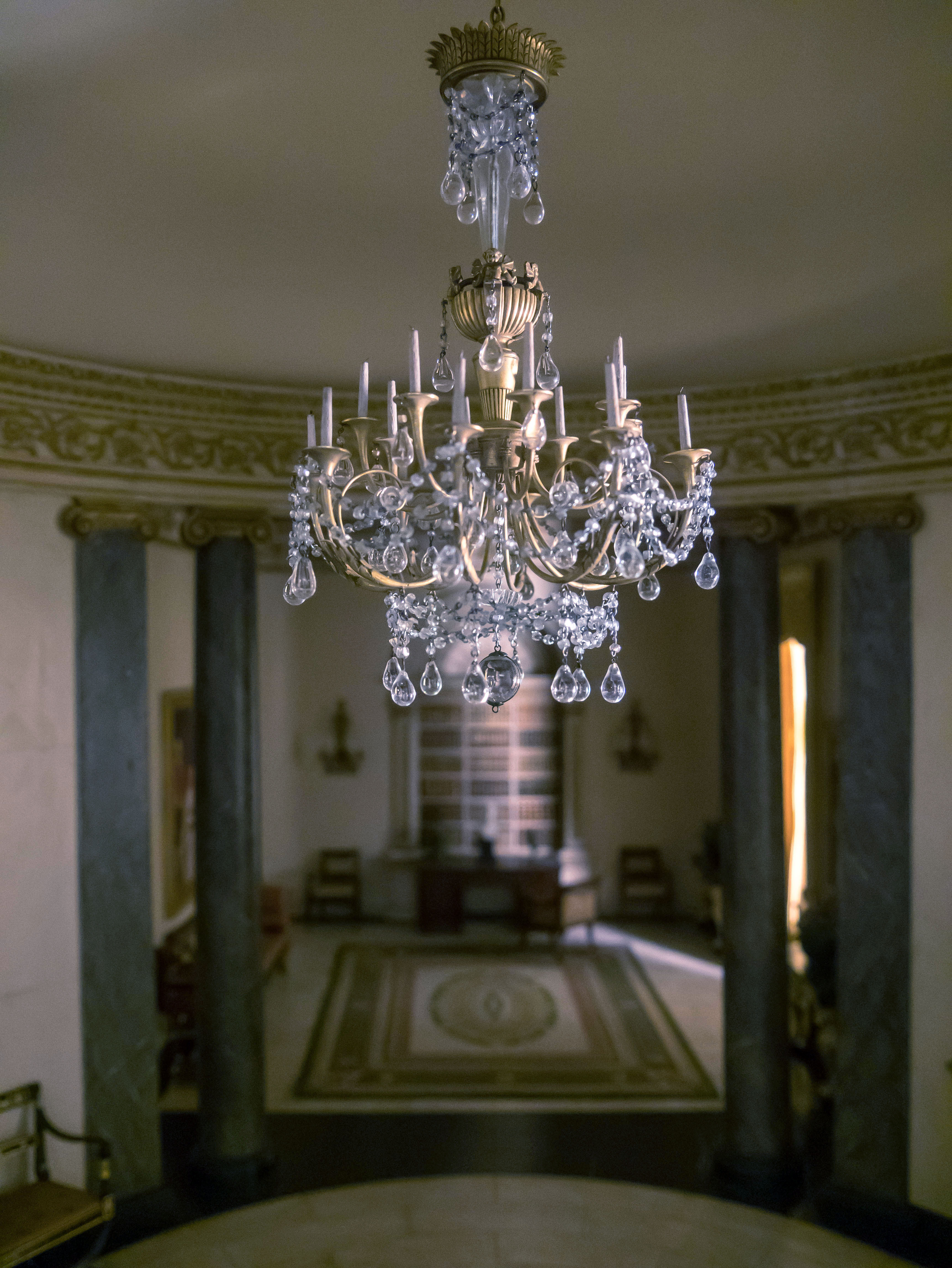
Chandelier detail, Thorne miniature rooms at the Art Institute of Chicago

During the Great Depression, Thorne had access to some of the top architects, interior designers, and craftsmen in the United States, who between 1932 and 1940 created approximately 100 "period rooms" under her direction. In total, 99 of the rooms are believed still to be in existence. The original 30 were placed on display at the 1933 Century of Progress Exposition in Chicago, and in 1940 they were the subject of a LIFE magazine article. Twenty of these original rooms were donated to the Phoenix Art Museum, where they remain on display.

The majority of the rooms, 68 in all, are on display at the Art Institute of Chicago, where they document European and American interiors from the late 13th century to the 1930s and the 17th century to the 1930s, respectively. The Art Institute's rooms were created by Thorne and her craftsmen between 1932 and 1940 at her studio on Oak Street on the city's Near North Side; the 31 European rooms were finished by 1937, while the 37 American rooms were completed by 1940. The rooms were gifted to the museum in 1941, and put on permanent display in 1954. The Art Institute of Chicago's rooms are among the museum's most popular permanent collections.

The Knoxville Museum of Art is home to 9 of the remaining rooms, while The Children's Museum of Indianapolis and the Kaye Miniature Museum in Los Angeles have one each.

Some of the Thorne rooms are miniature replicas of actual rooms. They were constructed on a 1:12 scale, or in other words a scale of 1 inch (2.5 cm) to 1 foot (0.30 m). The rooms are largely made of the same materials as full-sized rooms; for example, they include bowls made of silver, chandeliers made of crystal, and even original works of art, both miniature paintings (by Fernand Léger, Hildreth Meière, Amédée Ozenfant, and Léopold Survage) and sculptures (by John Storrs).

In 2010, the Art Institute of Chicago began decorating a few of its rooms for Christmas, Hanukkah, and New Year's, using period-appropriate decorations for each of the involved rooms. Lindsey Mican Morgan, who is responsible for the rooms at the Art Institute, began the practice of decorating the rooms for the holidays after discovering Thorne's great affection for Christmas while researching.

== See also ==
- Colleen Moore Fairy Castle
