= Richard Jolley =

American glass sculptor and entrepreneur

Richard Jolley (born November 21, 1952) is an American glass artist and sculptor. He is known for his installations at the Knoxville Museum of Art and the World Trade Center and his use of glass to depict the human figure.

== Early life ==
Richard Jolley was born on November 21, 1952, in Wichita, Kansas. His parents were Robert Louis Jolley and Doris Elizabeth Kerr Jolley. The family moved from Kansas to Oak Ridge, Tennessee in 1956 during Jolley's youth. Jolley's father worked as a research scientist at Oak Ridge National Laboratory and his mother was a teacher at Clinton High School.

Jolley's pursued his education in Tennessee and the southeast. He attended Oak Ridge High School and began his study of art at Tusculum College in Greenville, TN in 1970. He earned his BFA from George Peabody College in Nashville, TN, and then continued his studies at the Penland School of Crafts in North Carolina.

== Career ==
Works like Reclining Female (1989) and Swaying Figure (Male) (1990) demonstrate his figural work. Jolley "was one of the first artists in America to use the human figure and classical sculptural references in glass work."
