= Narcissa Niblack Thorne =

American miniaturist (1882–1966)

- Born: May 2, 1882; Vincennes, Indiana, U.S.
- Died: June 25, 1966 (aged 84); Chicago, Illinois, U.S.
- Occupation: Artist
- Spouse: James Ward Thorne (m. 1901)

Narcissa Niblack Thorne (May 2, 1882 – June 25, 1966) was an American artist known for her extremely detailed miniature rooms. Her works depict historical interiors from Europe, Asia and North America from the late 13th to the early 20th century. The Thorne rooms are honored with dedicated exhibits in the Phoenix Art Museum, the Knoxville Museum of Art, and the Art Institute of Chicago, where a special wing was built to house them.

== Early life and education ==
Thorne was born in Vincennes, Indiana, in 1882; her parents moved to Chicago when she was a child. She was educated partially at home and partially in public school, finishing at the Kenwood Institute. She married James Ward Thorne, an heir to the Montgomery Ward department store fortune, on May 29, 1901; they had been childhood sweethearts. They had two sons, named Ward and Niblack.

== Artistic career ==
Dining room miniatures, part of the Thorne Room at the Art Institute of Chicago

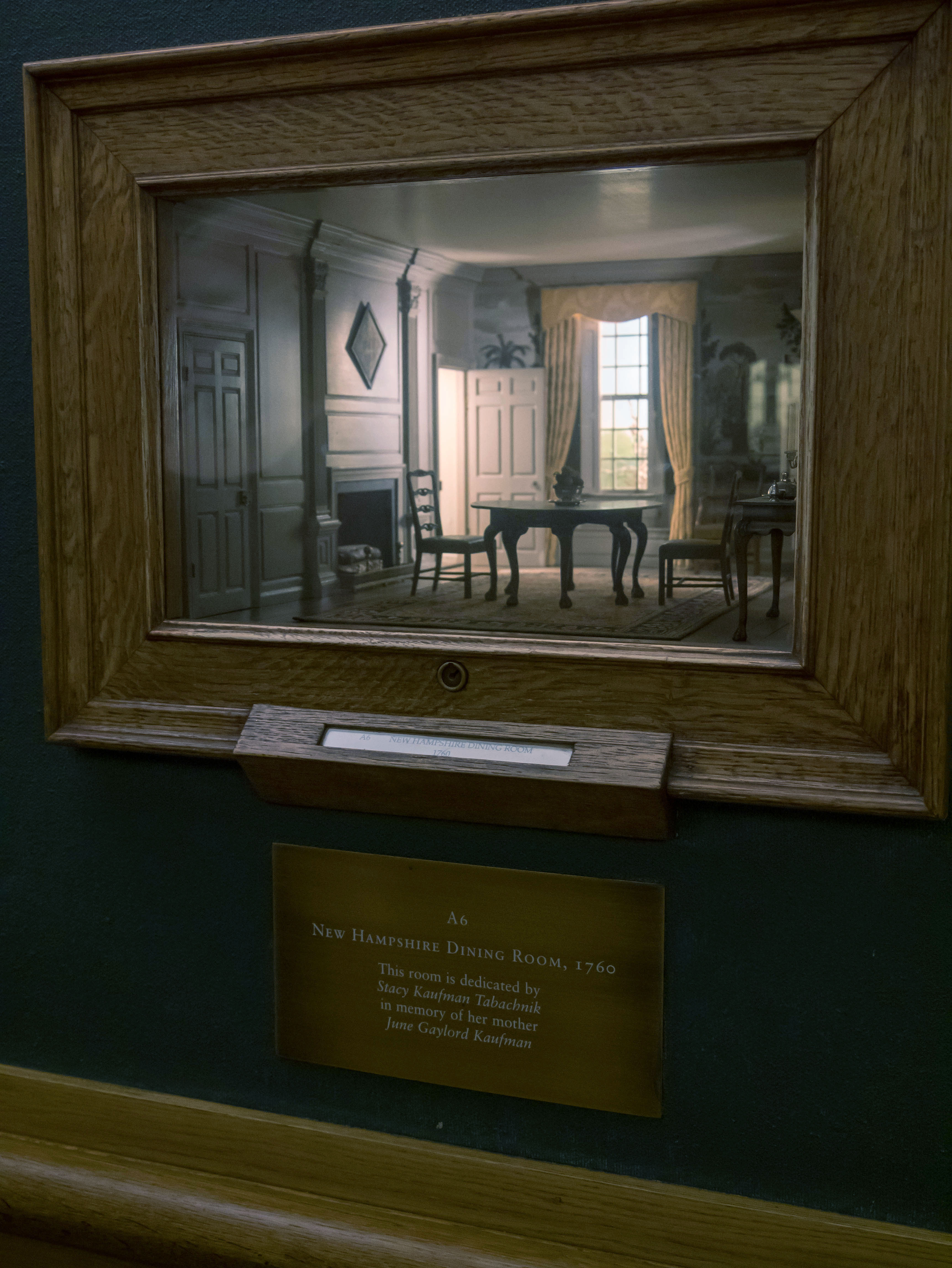
Frame

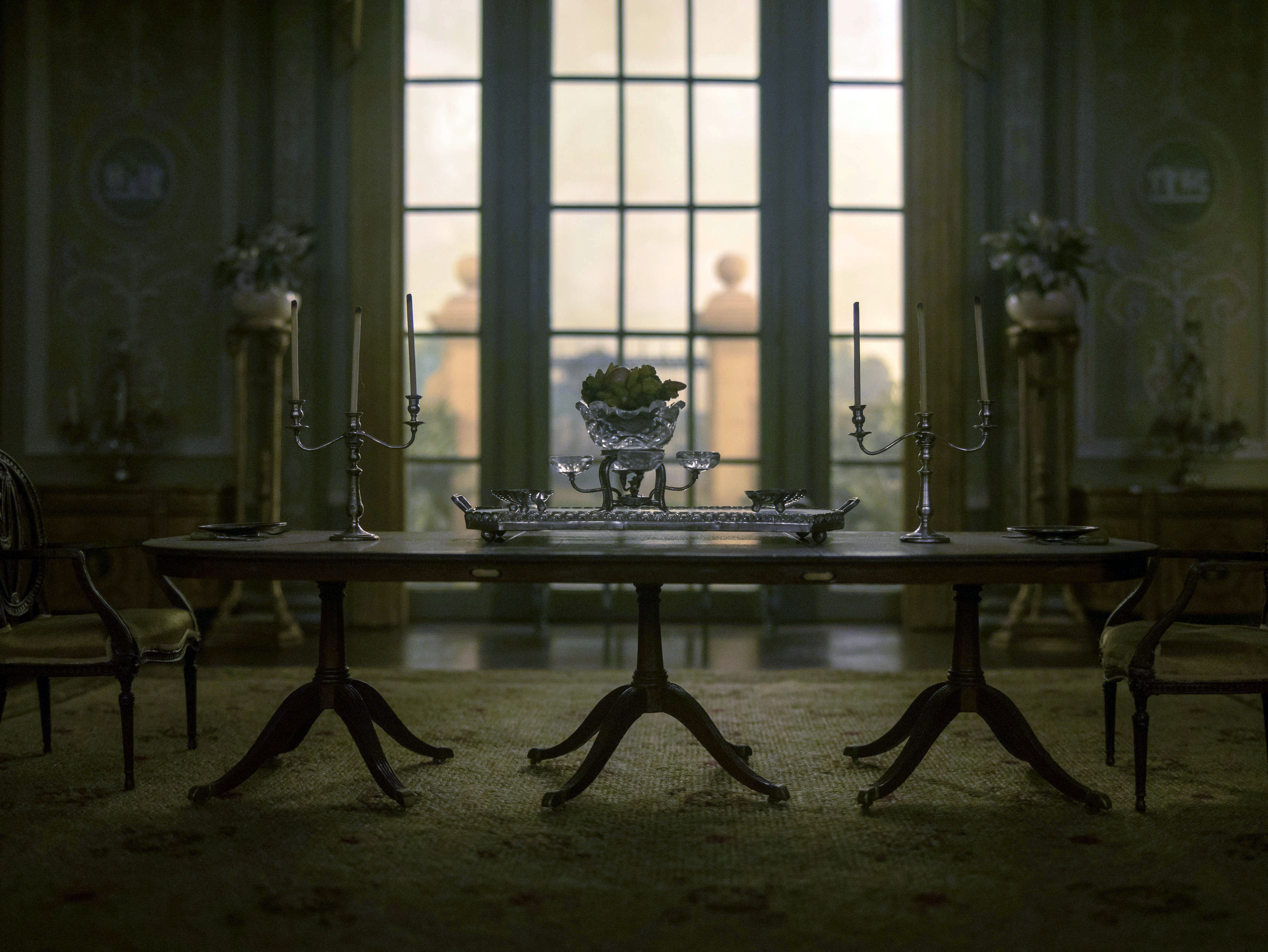
Tableau

There are various stories of how Thorne was initially prompted to construct the miniature rooms. Her interest in miniatures began early, and was encouraged by trinkets sent to her by her uncle, a Rear Admiral in the US Navy.

The first known exhibit of her work occurred in 1932. The high unemployment of the Great Depression made it possible for her to hire workers with highly specialized skills. Most of her exhibitions were private, held to raise funds for local charitable causes, but at the Century of Progress Exposition in 1933, Thorne's works were publicly exhibited in a dedicated building. Subsequent public exhibits included the Art Institute of Chicago and the New York World's Fair of 1940. In 1936, she received a request to make a miniature library depicting a room at Windsor Castle, to mark the planned coronation of Edward VIII; although the coronation never occurred, she delivered the room and it was displayed at the Victoria and Albert Museum.

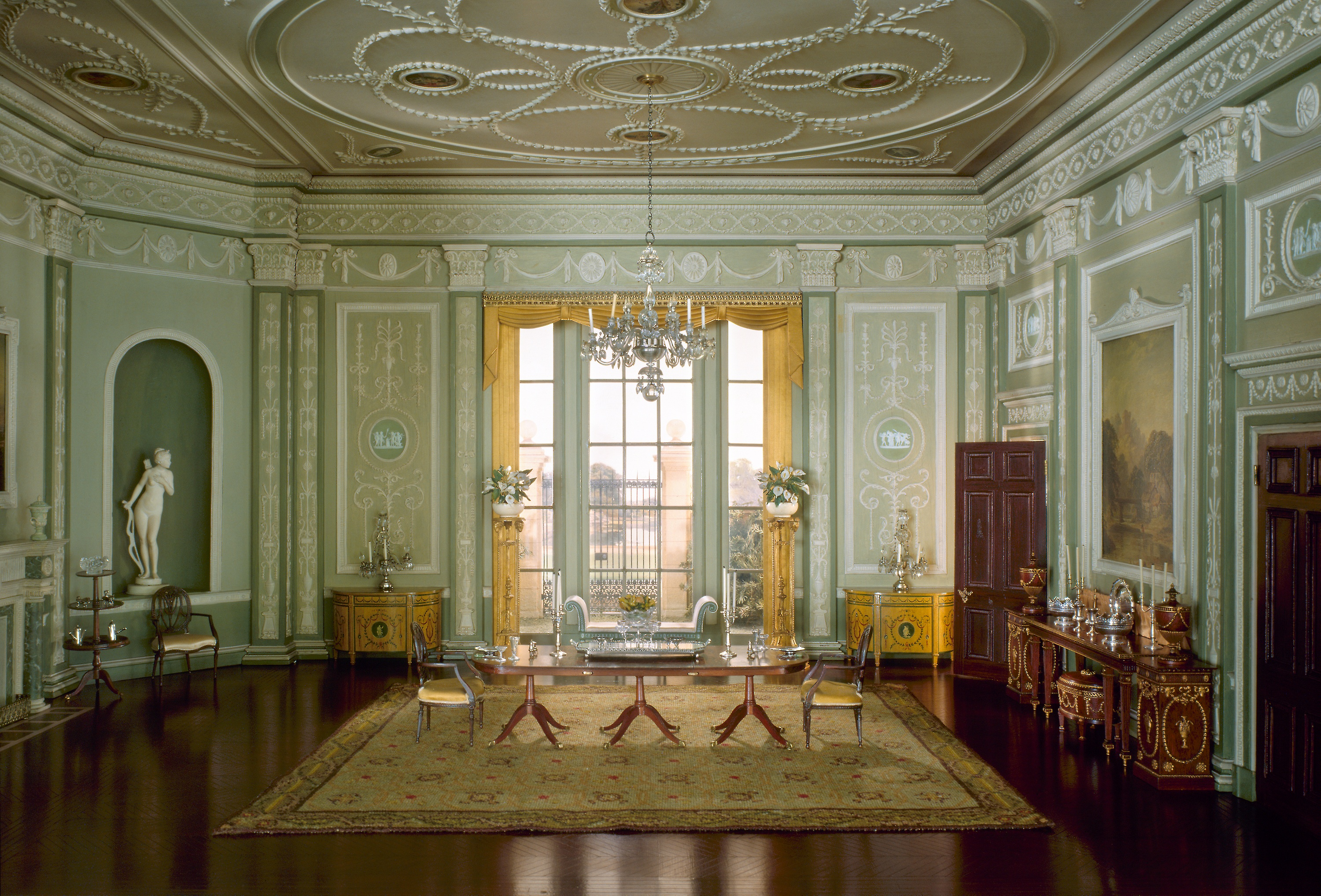
English Dining Room of the Georgian Period (1937) - Art Institute of Chicago

Thorne's best-known works show the interiors of upper-class homes from England, the United States, and France. The rooms are generally built on a scale of approximately 1:12, or one inch to one foot. They are painstakingly precise, and when maintenance is required, it has to be done with delicate tweezers and cotton swabs, the furnishings being carefully restored to their original position with reference to a detailed layout plan.

Although her rooms were extremely time-consuming and expensive to produce, Thorne never sought or received payment for any of them. The death of her husband in 1946 left Thorne with an estate worth upwards of 2 million dollars, enabling her to continue focusing on her work. However, eventually a shortage of sufficiently skilled workers forced her to focus on dioramas and shadow boxes.

When a permanent gallery was established for the Thorne rooms at the Art Institute in 1954, Thorne set up a fund to cover the costs of caring for the works.

== Legacy ==
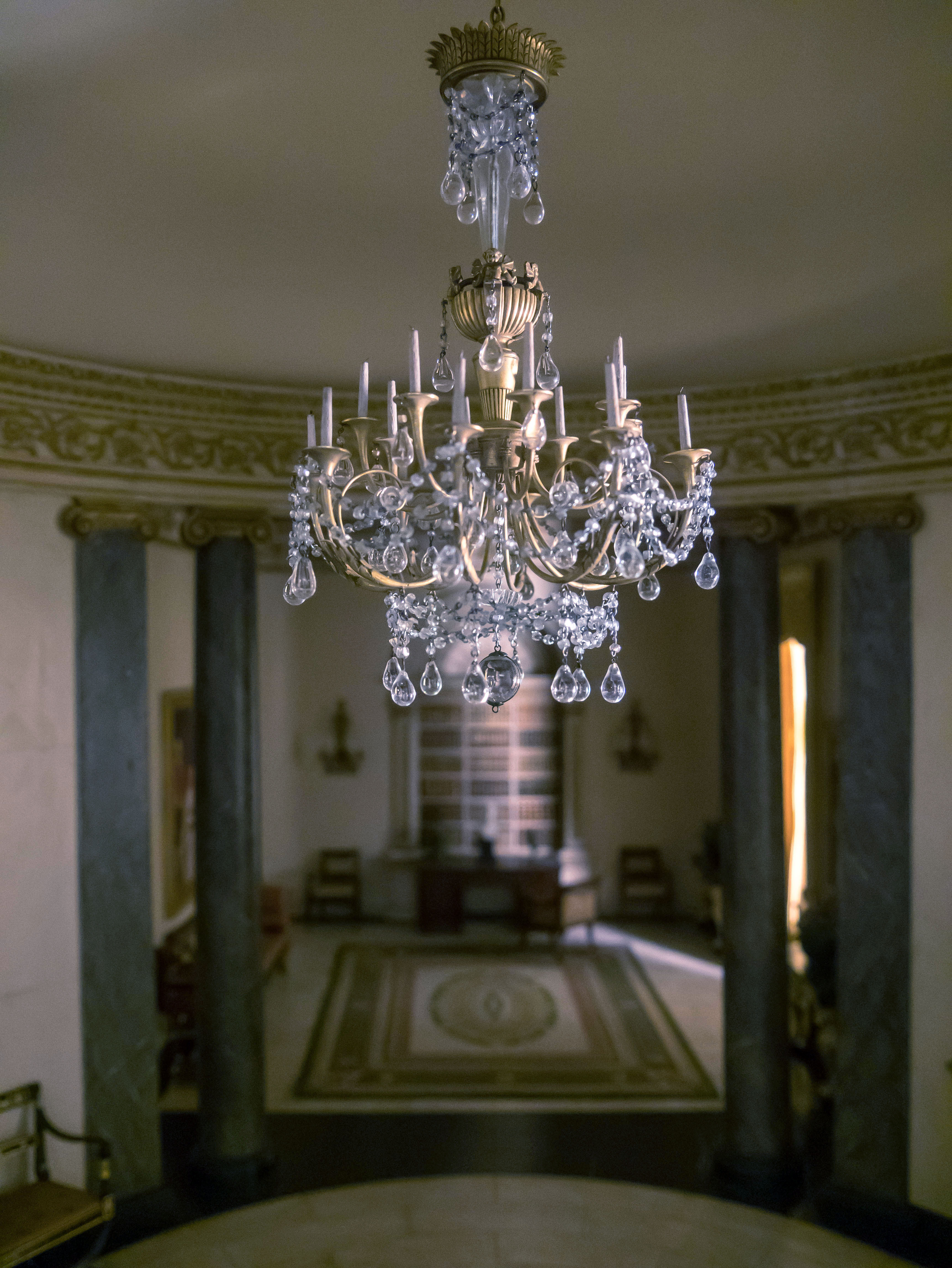
A chandelier and office miniature

Due to poor health, Thorne closed her studio in March 1966, donating her remaining works to charity. She died in Chicago in June of that year, and was buried in Rosehill Cemetery.

Most of Thorne's works were donated to museums and remain there, although some were auctioned off in 1985. Thorne herself arranged for thirty of the rooms to be auctioned off for charity in 1963.

Approximately one hundred Thorne rooms are known to exist. The Art Institute of Chicago holds 68 Thorne rooms, which originally occupied a dedicated wing but are now housed in a large room in the building's lower level. An additional 20 are held by the Phoenix Art Museum, and nine by the Knoxville Museum of Art. The remaining two are at The Children's Museum of Indianapolis, and the Kaye Miniature Museum in Los Angeles. The Museum of Miniature Houses in Carmel, Indiana displays a bar that Thorne auctioned off for charity in the 1950s and a scene featuring King Henry VIII and Anne Boleyn from the 1930s.

== Works cited ==
- Taras, Susan (2001). "Thorne, Narcissa Niblack". In Schulz; Hast (eds.). Women Building Chicago, 1790–1990. Indiana University Press. pp. 880–881. ISBN 0253338522.
