= Richmond Center for Visual Arts =

Visual arts center at Western Michigan University

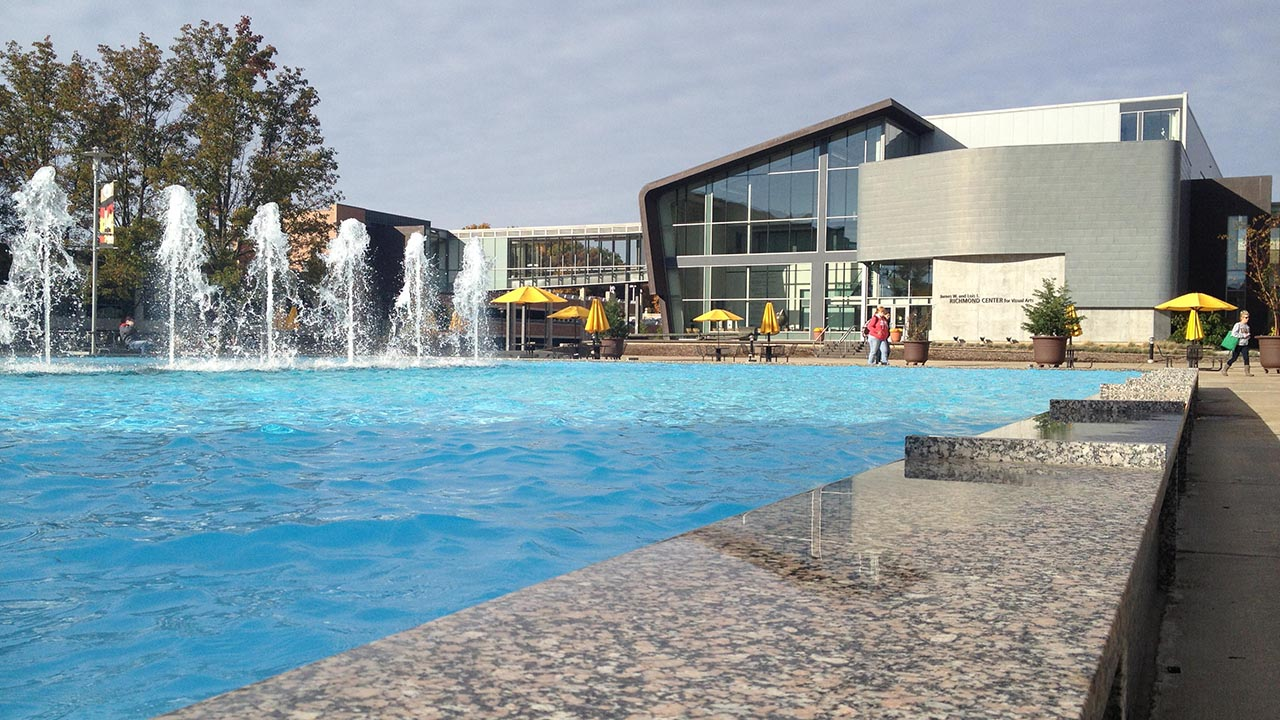
- Interactive map of Richmond Center for Visual Arts
- Address: 2110 Richmond Center for Visual Arts 49008; United States
- Location: Kalamazoo, Michigan
- Coordinates: 42.279935°N 85.616570°W
- Owner: Western Michigan University
- Type: Gallery
- Field size: 5000 square feet

Construction
- Opened: March 9, 2007

Website
- https://wmich.edu/finearts/facilities/richmond

James and Lois Richmond Center for Visual Arts is a visual arts center at Western Michigan University in Kalamazoo, Michigan, United States. It was opened on March 9, 2007 and was dedicated on Thursday, April 12, 2007. Along with Kohrman Hall, the Richmond Center for Visual Arts houses the Frostic School of Art.

The Richmond Center for Visual Arts is made up of three galleries on the first floor. It also includes two lecture halls, administration and advising offices, the WMU Design Center, a graphic design classroom and studio space, a small computer lab and a print center.

== Exhibition Spaces ==
- Albertine Monroe-Brown Gallery for rotating exhibitions
- Netzorg/Kerr Gallery for special exhibits and showings from the University Art Collection
- Eleanor R. and Robert A. DeVries Student Art Gallery for student and alumni exhibitions
- Atrium Gallery for primarily video and sound art
